= 100 Women (BBC) =

International award given by the BBC

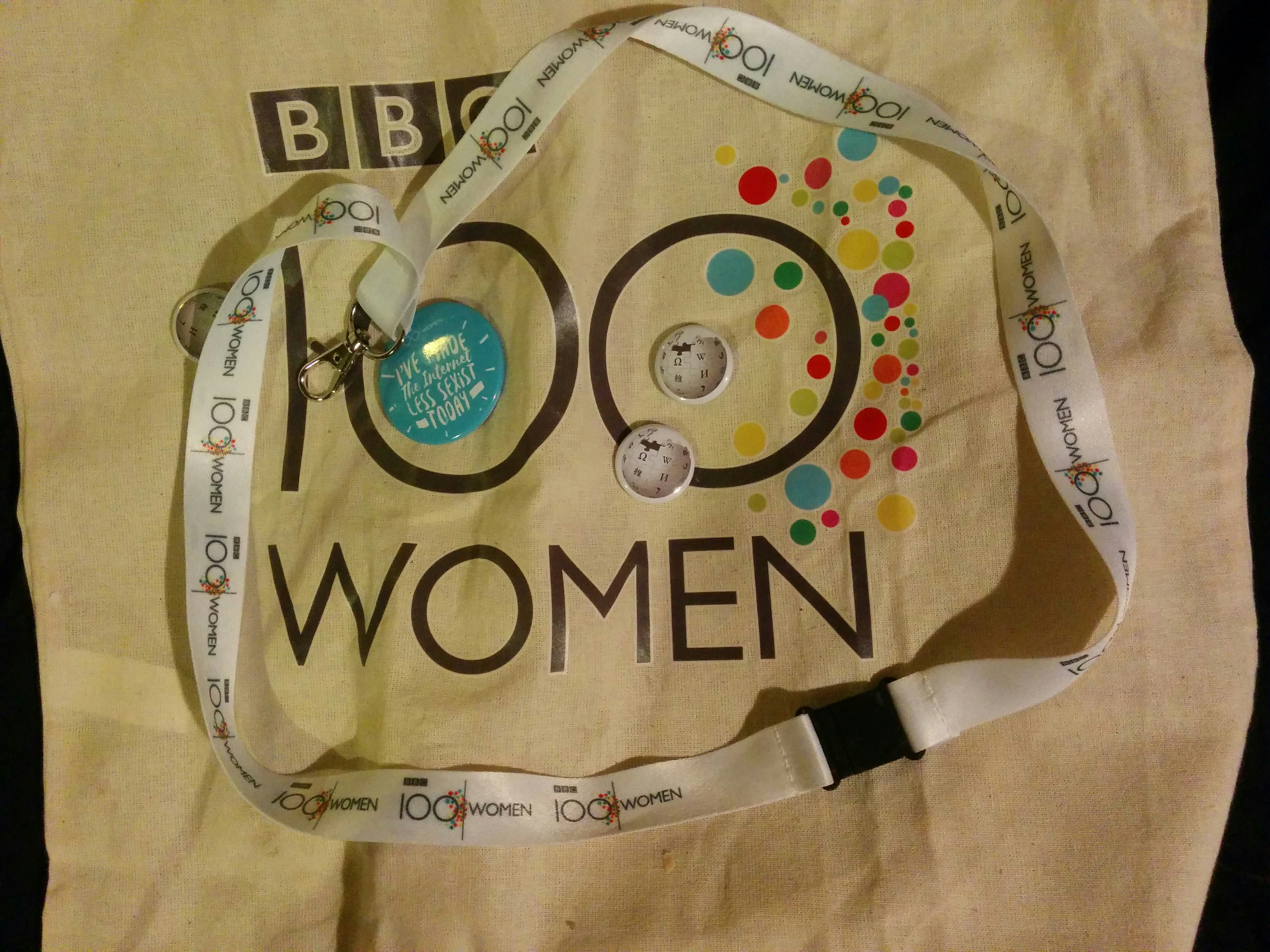
- Status: Active
- Frequency: Annually
- Years active: 2013–present
- Inaugurated: 22 October 2013
- Most recent: December 2024
- Website: 100 Women

100 Women is a BBC multi-format series established in 2013. The annual series examines the role of women in the 21st century and has included events in London and Mexico. Announcement of the list is the start of an international "BBC's women season", lasting three weeks including broadcast, online reports, debates and journalism on the topic of women. Women around the world are encouraged to participate via social media and comment on the list, as well as on the interviews and debates that follow release of the list.

== History ==
After the 2012 Delhi gang rape, then BBC Controller Liliane Landor, BBC editor Fiona Crack and other journalists, were inspired to create a series focusing on the issues and achievements of women in society today. They felt that many of the issues women faced were not getting in-depth coverage, and in March 2013 a "flood of feedback from female listeners" was received by the BBC to the effect that the corporation should provide more "content from and about women."

The BBC launched this series in 2013 to address the under-representation of women in the media. Women to participate in the first programme were chosen by survey in 26 different language services. Programming ran over the course of a month, culminating in a conference held on 25 October, in which 100 women from across the world discussed issues they shared. A wide range of topics were debated covering employment challenges, feminism, motherhood, and religion, to examine both the cultural and social challenges women faced in living their lives. One debate discussed whether being a feminist and a woman of faith was possible. The debate concluded with the majority thinking they excluded each other. The series included an interview with Malala and this was the first that had ever been broadcast.

The series has since covered many topics, including education, healthcare, equal pay, genital mutilation, domestic violence, and sexual abuse and seeks to provide women with a platform to discuss how to improve the world and eliminate sexism. Women included on the list are from around the globe, and involved in diverse fields of endeavour. Women who are already famous are included, as well as people who are less known.

== Laureates ==
=== 2024 ===
The 2024 list was released on 3 December and included women facing conflicts and humanitarian crises. The 2024 list was subdivided into five categories, including 11 in the category Climate Pioneers.

==== Climate pioneers ====
Image	Name	Country	Description
	Maheder Haileselassie	Ethiopia	Photographer
	Nejla Işık	Turkey	Village head and forest campaigner
	Adenike Titilope Oladosu	Nigeria	Climate justice advocate
	Inna Modja	Mali	Artist and climate advocate
	Enas Al-Ghoul	Palestinian Territories	Agricultural engineer
Shilshila Acharya, recipient of 2018 Conservation Award (WWF Nepal)	Shilshila Acharya	Nepal	Sustainability entrepreneur
	Naomi Chanda	Zambia	Farmer and trainer
	Rosmarie Wydler-Wälti	Switzerland	Teacher and climate campaigner
	Sasha Luccioni	Canada	Computer scientist
	Rosa Vásquez Espinoza	Peru	Chemical biologist
	Brigitte Baptiste	Colombia	Ecologist

==== Culture and education ====
Image	Name	Country	Description
	Olivia McVeigh	United Kingdom	Make-up artist
	Christina Assi	Lebanon	Photojournalist
	Dilorom Yuldosheva	Uzbekistan	Seamstress and businesswoman
	Xuân Phượng	Vietnam	Film director, author, gallery owner
Nigel Baker and Eugenia Bonetti	Eugenia Bonetti	Italy	Nun
	Lesley Lokko	Ghana/United Kingdom	Architect
	Su Min	China	Road tripper and influencer
	Anat Hoffman	Israel	Religious campaigner
	Hinda Abdi Mohamoud	Somalia	Journalist
	Svetlana Anokhina	Russia	Human rights campaigner
Hamida Aman	Hamida Aman	Afghanistan	Media and education entrepreneur
Johanna Bahamón 2018	Johana Bahamón	Colombia	Social activist
	Idania del Río	Cuba	Fashion entrepreneur
	Helen Molyneux	United Kingdom	Co-founder, Monumental Welsh Women
	Shin Daewe	Myanmar	Filmmaker
	Cristina Rivera Garza	Mexico/United States	Writer
	Shahrnush Parsipur	Iran/United States	Writer and translator
	Plestia Alaqad	Palestinian Territories	Journalist and poet
	Zhanylsynzat Turganbaeva	Kyrgyzstan	Museum manager
	Sharon Kleinbaum	United States	Rabbi
	Margarita Barrientos	Argentina	Soup kitchen founder
	Yasmeen Mjalli	Palestinian Territories	Designer
	Tracey Emin	United Kingdom	Artist
	Roxy Murray	United Kingdom	Disability rights advocate
	Maheder Haileselassie	Ethiopia	Photographer
	Pooja Sharma	India	Performer of funerary rites
	Linda Dröfn Gunnarsdóttir	Iceland	Women's shelter manager
	Harbia Al Himiary	Yemen	Heritage conservation engineer
	Maria Teresa Horta	Portugal	Poet

==== Entertainment and sport ====
Image	Name	Country	Description
	Vinesh Phogat	India	Wrestler
EC 2024 - half marathon W (cropped)	Joan Chelimo Melly	Kenya/Romania	Long-distance runner
	Hend Sabry	Tunisia	Actress
	Naomi Watanabe	Japan	Comedian
	Gaby Moreno	Guatemala	Latin-pop musician
	Allyson Felix	United States	Track and field athlete
Zakia Khudadadi in 2024	Zakia Khudadadi	Afghanistan	Taekwondo Paralympian
	Noella Wiyaala Nwadei	Ghana	Afro-pop musician
	Tracy Otto	United States	Archer
	Hadiqa Kiani	Pakistan	Singer and songwriter
	Zhiying (Tania) Zeng	Chile	Table tennis player
	Raye	United Kingdom	Singer
	Sharon Stone	United States	Actress
	Elaha Soroor	Afghanistan	Singer and composer
	Firda Marsya Kurnia	Indonesia	Heavy metal musician
	Chloé Zhao	United Kingdom	Film director
	Rebeca Andrade	Brazil	Gymnast
	Inna Modja	Mali	Artist and climate advocate
	Madison Tevlin	Canada	Talk-show host and model
	Kim Ye-ji	South-Korea	Sport shooter

==== Politics and advocacy ====
Image	Name	Country	Description
	Aruna Roy	India	Social activist
	Angela Rayner	United Kingdom	Deputy Prime Minister
	Feng Yuan	China	Women's rights advocate
Guerline Jozef, Executive Director of the Haitian Bridge Alliance	Guerline Jozef	Haiti	Immigration rights campaigner
Hala al-Karib or Hala Alkarib is a Sudanese activist against sexual violence in war. She is the regional director of the Strategic Initiative for Women in the Horn of Africa	Hala Alkarib	Sudan	Activist against sexual violence in war
	Danielle Cantor	Israel/Palestinian Territories	Cultural activist
	Fawzia al-Otaibi	Saudi Arabia/United Kingdom	Women's rights campaigner
	Nejla Işık	Turkey	Village head and forest campaigner
Image of Katherine Martínez in the video 'Los niños del J.M. de los Ríos necesitan salir del país'	Katherine Martínez	Venezuela	Human rights lawyer
	Kemi Badenoch	United Kingdom	Leader of the Conservative party
	Yumi Suzuki	Japan	Plaintiff in forced sterilisation lawsuit
	Nadia Murad	Iraq	Nobel Peace Prize laureate
	Gisèle Pelicot	France	Advocate of justice for sexual assault survivors, Rape survivor
	Huang Jie	Taiwan	Politician
Annie Matundu 1	Annie Sinanduku Mwange	DR Congo	Miner
	Susan Collins	United States	Senator
Kasha Jacqueline Nabagesera	Kasha Jacqueline Nabagesera	Uganda	Diversity and inclusion campaigner
	Einav Zangauker	Israel	Hostage release campaigner
	Rosmarie Wydler-Wälti	Switzerland	Teacher and climate campaigner
	Mahrang Baloch	Pakistan	Medical doctor and political activist
	Latisha McCrudden	Ireland	Irish Traveller Movement activist
'Waaddao' Chumaporn Taengkliang, LGBT Rights Activist and Member of TEA Group (Togetherness for Equality and Action)	Ann Chumaporn (Waaddao)	Thailand	LGBTQ+ rights campaigner
	Lilia Chanysheva	Russia	Political activist and ex prisoner
	Zhina Modares Gorji	Iran	Women's rights campaigner
Amanda Zurawski 2024 (cropped)	Amanda Zurawski	United States	Reproductive rights advocate
	Ruth López	El Salvador	Lawyer
	Lourdes Barreto	Brazil	Campaigner for sex workers’ rights
	Hana-Rawhiti Maipi-Clarke	New Zealand	Politician

==== Science, health and technology ====
Image	Name	Country	Description
	Enas Al-Ghoul	Palestinian Territories	Agricultural engineer
	Kauna Malgwi	Nigeria	Union leader for content moderators
	Olga Rudnieva	Ukraine	Founder, Superhumans Centre
	Olga Olefirenko	Ukraine	Farmer
	Sasha Luccioni	Canada	Computer scientist
	Rikta Akter Banu	Bangladesh	Nurse and school founder
	Shireen Abed	Palestinian Territories	Paediatrician
Silvana2010	Silvana Santos	Brazil	Biologist
	Brigitte Baptiste	Colombia	Ecologist
	Sara Berkai	United Kingdom/Eritrea	Designer of DIY science kits
	Georgina Long	Australia	Medical oncologist
	Katalin Karikó	Hungary	Biochemist and Nobel laureate
	Nour Emam	Egypt	Fem-tech entrepreneur
	Adenike Titilope Oladosu	Nigeria	Climate justice advocate
	Subin Park	South Korea	Founder, Stair Crusher Club
Gabriela Salas Cabrera	Gabriela Salas Cabrera	Mexico	Programmer and data scientist
	Naomi Chanda	Zambia	Farmer and trainer
	Safa Ali	Sudan	Obstetrician
	Sneha Revanur	United States	AI expert
	Samia	Syria	Psychology counsellor
	Shilshila Acharya	Nepal	Sustainability entrepreneur
	Sunita Williams	United States	Astronaut
	Rosa Vásquez Espinoza	Peru	Chemical biologist

=== 2023 ===
The 2023 list was released on 21 November and it included 21 women involved with climate change. The laureates included the Indian cricketer Harmanpreet Kaur, Aitana Bonmatí, Michelle Obama, Amal Clooney, Timnit Gebru, Trần Gấm and Huda Kattan. The list was subdivided into four categories: Culture & Education, Entertainment & Sport, Politics & Advocacy and Science, Health & Tech, with 28 of the laureates dubbed climate pioneers (shown as green rows below).

==== Politics & Advocacy ====
Image	Name	Country of birth	Description
	Maryam Al-Khawaja	Bahrain (also a citizen of Denmark)	Human rights campaigner, board member of Civicus and the International Service for Human Rights
	Shamsa Araweelo	Somalia (also a citizen of the UK)	Anti-FGM campaigner
	Yasmina Benslimane	Morocco	Founder of Politics4Her and gender equality campaigner
	Yael Braudo-Bahat	Israel	Peace activist and co-director at Women Wage Peace
	Alicia Cahuiya	Ecuador	Indigenous rights activist
	Amal Clooney	Lebanon (also a citizen of the UK)	Human rights lawyer
	Dehenna Davison	UK	Member of Parliament
	Christiana Figueres	Costa Rica	Diplomat and climate policy negotiator with the United Nations Framework Convention on Climate Change
	Bella Galhos	East Timor	Political activist and LGBTQ+ rights advocate
	Rina Gonoi	Japan	Former military officer and anti-sexual harassment activist
	Sonia Guajajara	Brazil	State minister for native peoples and indigenous rights campaigner
	Renita Holmes	USA	Housing rights campaigner
	Nataša Kandić	Serbia	Lawyer and human rights activist. Founder of the Humanitarian Law Center
	Rukshana Kapali	Nepal	Housing rights campaigner and transgender human rights activist
	Sofia Kosacheva	Russia	Firefighter
	Monica McWilliams	UK	Former politician and peace negotiator during the Good Friday Agreement talks. Co-founder of the Northern Ireland Women's Coalition
	Najla Mohamed-Lamin	Western Sahara	Women's rights and climate activist in the Saharawi refugee camps
	Ulanda Mtamba	Malawi	Campaigner against child marriage
	Tamar Museridze	Georgia	Investigative journalist
	Neema Namadamu	Democratic Republic of Congo	Disability rights campaigner
	Michelle Obama	USA	Attorney, author and campaigner
	Sepideh Rashnu	Iran	Writer and artist
	Bernadette Smith	Canada	Advocate for families of missing indigenous women and girls. Co-founder of Drag the Red
	Iryna Stavchuk	Ukraine	Climate policy adviser at the European Climate Foundation
	Gloria Steinem	USA	Feminist leader and co-founder of Ms. magazine
	Summia Tora	Afghanistan	Refugee rights campaigner
	Xu Zaozao	China	Egg freezing campaigner. Advocate for single women's reproductive rights and bodily autonomy

==== Entertainment & Sport ====
Image	Name	Country of birth	Description
	Aitana Bonmatí	Spain	Footballer, winner of the Ballon d'Or and former UEFA player of the year
	Antinisca Cenci	Italy	Equestrian vaulter
	Andreza Delgado	Brazil	Curator and cultural manager. Co-founder of PerifaCon
	Desak Made Rita Kusuma Dewi	Indonesia	Speed climber
	America Ferrera	USA	Actor and Latino rights advocate
	Anne Grall	France	Comedian
	Georgia Harrison	UK	TV personality. Anti-revenge porn campaigner
	Harmanpreet Kaur	India	Cricketer
	Dayeon Lee	South Korea	Climate change campaigner for Kpop4planet
	Justina Miles	USA	Deaf performer
	Dia Mirza	India	Actor. Goodwill Ambassador for the United Nations Environment Programme and a board member of the Sanctuary Nature Foundation
	Zandile Ndhlovu	South Africa	Freediving instructor
	Alice Oseman	UK	Award-winning author, illustrator and screenwriter
	Paramida	Germany	DJ and music producer
	Camila Pirelli	Paraguay	Olympic heptathlete and EcoAthlete Champion
	Aziza Sbaity	Lebanon	Sprinter
	Khine Hnin Wai	Myanmar	Actor and activist
	Bianca Williams	UK	Athlete

==== Culture & Education ====
Image	Name	Country of birth	Description
	Afroze-Numa	Pakistan	Shepherdess
	Hosai Ahmadzai	Afghanistan	TV presenter on Shamshad TV
	Esi Buobasa	Ghana	Fishmonger
	Chila Kumari Burman	UK	Artist
	Paulina Chiziane	Mozambique	Writer. Winner of the Camões Prize
	Susanne Etti	Australia	Sustainable tourism expert
	Licia Fertz	Italy	Anti-ageism, feminism and LGBTQ+ activist
	Jannatul Ferdous	Bangladesh	Burns survivor, film-maker, writer and disability rights campaigner
	Natalia Idrisova	Tajikistan	Green energy consultant
	Vee Kativhu	Zimbabwe (also a citizen of the UK)	Content creator and YouTuber
	Huda Kattan	USA	Founder of Huda Beauty
	Sophia Kianni	USA	Student and social entrepreneur
	Arati Kumar-Rao	India	Photographer
	Louise Mabulo	Philippines	Farmer and entrepreneur. Recognised by the United Nations Environment Programme as a Young Champion of the Earth
	Marijeta Mojašević	Montenegro	Disability rights activist
	Sarah Ott	USA	School teacher and climate change ambassador with the National Center for Science Education
	Jetsunma Tenzin Palmo	UK (citizen of India)	Bhikṣuṇī buddhist nun
	Lala Pasquinelli	Argentina	Artist, lawyer, poet, lesbian and feminist activist
	Jess Pepper	UK	Founder of Climate Café and fellow of the Royal Society of Arts
	Matcha Phorn-in	Thailand	Campaigner for indigenous and LGBTQ+ rights
	Carolina Díaz Pimentel	Peru	Journalist specialising in neurodivergence and mental health coverage
	Shairbu Sagynbaeva	Kyrgyzstan	Co-founder of For Life sewing shop
	Daria Serenko	Russia	Poet, writer and political activist. Member of Feminist Anti-War resistance
	Kera Sherwood-O'Regan	New Zealand	Indigenous rights and disability advocate
	Sagarika Sriram	United Arab Emirates	Educator and climate adviser
	Clara Elizabeth Fragoso Ugarte	Mexico	Truck driver
	Oksana Zabuzhko	Ukraine	Writer

==== Science, Health & Tech ====
Image	Name	Country of birth	Description
	Basima Abdulrahman	Iraq	Green building entrepreneur
	Bayang	China	Diarist and sustainability advocate
	Amina Al-Bish	Syria	Volunteer rescue worker with the Syria Civil Defence
	Rumaitha Al Busaidi	Oman	Scientist
	Sara Al-Saqqa	Palestine	General surgeon
	Susan Chomba	Kenya	Scientist and director at the World Resources Institute
	Leanne Cullen-Unsworth	UK	Marine scientist
	Canan Dagdeviren	Turkey	Scientist and inventor
	Izabela Dłużyk	Poland	Sound recordist
	Marcela Fernández Barreneche	Colombia	Expedition guide
	Anamaría Font Villarroel	Venezuela	Particle physicist
	Trần Gấm	Vietnam	Biogas business owner
	Timnit Gebru	Ethiopia (citizen of USA)	AI expert
	Claudia Goldin	USA	Economist and recipient of Nobel Prize in Economics
	Anna Huttunen	Finland	Carbon impact tech expert
	Gladys Kalema-Zikusoka	Uganda	Veterinarian and conservationist. Founder of Conservation Through Public Health. Recognised by the United Nations Environment Programme as a Champion of the Earth in 2021
	Sonia Kastner	USA	Wildfire detection tech developer
	Astrid Linder	Sweden	Professor of traffic safety
	Neha Mankani	Pakistan	Midwife
	Wanjira Mathai	Kenya	Environmental adviser. Former leader of the Green Belt Movement. Managing director for Africa & Global Partnerships at the World Resources Institute and adviser to the Clean Cooking Alliance and the European Climate Foundation
	Isabel Farías Meyer	Chile	Journalist and early menopause campaigner
	Natalie Psaila	Malta	Medical doctor
	Olena Rozvadovska	Ukraine	Children's rights advocate
	Sumini	Indonesia	Forest manager
	Fabiola Trejo	Mexico	Social psychologist
	Jennifer Uchendu	Nigeria	Mental health advocate. Founder of SustyVibes
	Qiyun Woo	Singapore	Storyteller and environmentalist
	Elham Youssefian	Iran (citizen of USA)	Human rights lawyer, adviser on climate and adviser on disability to the International Disability Alliance

=== 2022 ===
The list for 2022 was released on 6 December. Women included this year were Olena Zelenska of Ukraine, Nana Darkoa Sekyiamah, the singer Billie Eilish, Priyanka Chopra Jonas, Selma Blair, Lina Abu Akleh, Alla Pugacheva, Elnaz Rekabi and Yulimar Rojas. The list was subdivided into four categories: Culture & Sport, Activism & Advocacy, Politics & Education and Health & Science.

==== Politics & Education ====
Image	Name	Country of birth	Description
	Maeen Al-Obaidi	Yemen	Lawyer and mediator
	Fatima Amiri	Afghanistan	Student
	Nathalie Becquart	France (also a citizen of the Vatican City)	Nun in the Congregation of Xavières and first ever female Undersecretary of the Synod of Bishops.
	Taisia Bekbulatova	Russia	Journalist. Founder of the independent media outlet Holod
	Kristina Berdynskykh	Ukraine	Journalist
	María Fernanda Castro Maya	Mexico	Disability rights advocate
	Chanel Contos	Australia	Sexual consent activist
	Eva Copa	Bolivia	Politician and mayor of El Alto of Aymara descent
	Joy Ezeilo	Nigeria	Law professor and former United Nations Special Rapporteur on trafficking in persons
	Ibijoke Faborode	Nigeria	Founder of ElectHER
	Erika Hilton	Brazil	Politician and campaigner for black and LGBT rights. The first black trans woman ever elected to a seat in the National Congress of Brazil
	Park Ji-hyun	South Korea	Political reformer
	Zahra Joya	Afghanistan	Journalist and founder of Rukhshana Media
	Ursula von der Leyen	Germany	First ever female President of the European Commission
	Naomi Long	Northern Ireland (uses a UK passport)	Politician and former Lord Mayor of Belfast
	Ayesha Malik	Pakistan	First female judge on the Supreme Court of Pakistan
	Zara Mohammadi	Iran	Kurdish language educator
	Mia Mottley	Barbados	First female Prime Minister of Barbados
	Sepideh Qoliyan	Iran	Political campaigner and workers’ rights advocate
	Roza Salih	Iraq (active in Scotland, UK)	Politician and member of activist group the Glasgow Girls
	Simone Tebet	Brazil	Member of the Brazilian Federal Senate
	Kisanet Tedros	Eritrea	Educational entrepreneur and Tigrinyan digital content creator
	Cheng Yen	Taiwan	Buddhist philanthropist, founder of the Tzu Chi humanitarian organisation
	Nazanin Zaghari-Ratcliffe	Iran (also a citizen of the UK)	Charity worker
	Olena Zelenska	Ukraine	Incumbent First Lady, architect and screenwriter

==== Culture & Sport ====
Image	Name	Country of birth	Description
	Dima Aktaa	Syria	Refugee and parathlete
	Zar Amir Ebrahimi	Iran	Actor and founder of Alambic Productions
	Selma Blair	USA	Actor and multiple sclerosis awareness campaigner
	Ona Carbonell	Spain	Olympic medal winning synchronised swimmer
	Sarah Chan	South Sudan	NBA scout and former professional basketball player. Advocate for education and sports
	Priyanka Chopra	India	Actor and producer. UNICEF Goodwill Ambassador, campaigning for children's rights and education for girls
	Billie Eilish	USA	Singer and songwriter
	Ons Jabeur	Tunisia	Tennis player
	Sneha Jawale	India	Social worker
	Reema Juffali	Saudi Arabia	Racing driver and founder of Theeba Motorsport
	Kadri Keung	Hong Kong	Fashion designer
	Miky Lee	South Korea	Producer, architect of KCON music festival and vice-chair of CJ ENM
	Laura McAllister	WalesUK	Professor and former footballer. LGBTQ+ sports ambassador
	Milli	Thailand	Rap artist
	Rita Moreno	Puerto RicoUSA	EGOT winning actor
	Salima Rhadia Mukansanga	Rwanda	Football referee
	Alla Pugacheva	Russia	Musician
	Elnaz Rekabi	Iran	Climber, appeared at the Asian Championships without a hijab in violation of Iranian law and was arrested as her action was interpreted by the Iranian government as a silent protest against the law in the context of feminist protesters in Iran at the time
	Yulimar Rojas	Venezuela	Olympic medal winning triple jumper and LGBTQ+ rights advocate
	Sally Scales	Australia	Pitjantjatjaran artist
	Nana Darkoa Sekyiamah	Ghana	Writer and feminist activist
	Geetanjali Shree	India	Author and winner of the International Booker Prize
	Alexandra Skochilenko	Russia	Artist, imprisoned by the Russian government for protesting against the Russian invasion of Ukraine
	Velia Vidal	Colombia	Writer and El Chocó cultural and education campaigner
	Esraa Warda	AlgeriaUSA	Dancer and proponent of raï, a grassroots genre historically associated with social protest

==== Activism & Advocacy ====
Image	Name	Country of birth	Description
	Lina Abu Akleh	Palestine	Human rights advocate
	Velmariri Bambari	Indonesia	Activist and women's rights campaigner
	Tarana Burke	USA	Activist. Started the MeToo movement.
	Sanjida Islam Choya	Bangladesh	Student
	Heidi Crowter	UK	Disability rights campaigner with an emphasis on Down syndrome
	Sandya Eknelygoda	Sri Lanka	Human rights activist
	Gohar Eshghi	Iran	Civil activist and Iranian Complainant Mother
	Ceci Flores	Mexico	Activist and member of the Madres Buscadoras de Sonora collective
	Geraldina Guerra Garcés	Ecuador	Women's rights and anti-femicide activist
	Moud Goba	UK	Refugee and LGBTQ+ rights activist. Founding member of UK Black Pride
	Women cutting their hair	Iran	Group protesting against Iranian laws against women, (especially the law mandating that women wear a hijab at all times) and against its restrictive laws and theocratic government in general
	Gehad Hamdy	Egypt	Dentist and humanitarian
	Judith Heumann	USA	Disability rights advocate
	Jebina Yasmin Islam	UK	Campaigner for women's safety
	Layli (pseudonym)	Iran	Protester
	Hadizatou Mani	Niger	Anti-slavery campaigner
	Oleksandra Matviichuk	Ukraine	Human rights lawyer and pro-democracy activist at the Center for Civil Liberties. Helps Ukraine document proof of Russian atrocities resulting from the Russian invasion of Ukraine.
	Narges Mohammadi	Iran	Journalist and human rights campaigner. Vice-president of the Defenders of Human Rights Center
	Tamana Zaryab Paryani	Afghanistan	Human rights activist
	Alice Pataxó	Brazil	Indigenous rights activist and climate campaigner
	Roya Piraei	Iran	Kurdish rights activist
	Yuliia Sachuk	Ukraine	Disability rights advocate
	Suvada Selimović	Bosnia and Herzegovina	Peace campaigner
	Efrat Tilma	Israel	Transgender volunteer and LGBTQ+ activist
	Zhou Xiaoxuan	China	Feminist activist

==== Health & Science ====
Image	Name	Country of birth	Description
	Aye Nyein Thu	Myanmar	Medical doctor
	Sirisha Bandla	India	Aeronautical engineer
	Victoria Baptiste	USA	Nurse and vaccine educator. WHO Goodwill Ambassador for cervical cancer elimination
	Niloufar Bayani	Iran	Ecologist and programme manager at the Persian Wildlife Heritage Foundation
	Sandy Cabrera Arteaga	Honduras	Sexual and reproductive rights advocate
	Samrawit Fikru	Ethiopia	Tech entrepreneur
	Wegahta Gebreyohannes Abera	Ethiopia	Humanitarian aid worker
	Dilek Gürsoy	Germany	Heart surgeon
	Sofía Heinonen	Argentina	Conservationist
	Kimiko Hirata	Japan	Climate change activist. Recipient of Goldman Environmental Prize
	Judy Kihumba	Kenya	Sign language interpreter
	Marie Christina Kolo	Madagascar	Climate entrepreneur and ecofeminist
	Iryna Kondratova	Ukraine	Paediatrician at the Kharkiv Regional Perinatal Centre
	Asonele Kotu	South Africa	Tech entrepreneur
	Erika Liriano	Dominican Republic	Cocoa entrepreneur.
	Naja Lyberth	Greenland	Psychologist and trauma therapist
	Nigar Marf	Iraq	Nurse
	Monica Musonda	Zambia	Businesswoman and nutrition advocate
	Ifeoma Ozoma	USA	Public policy and tech specialist
	Yuliia Paievska	Ukraine	Paramedic and founder of Taira's Angels
	Jane Rigby	USA	Astronomer and astrophysicist. Advocate for equity and inclusion in STEM
	Ainura Sagyn	Kyrgyzstan	Computer engineer and ecofeminist
	Monica Simpson	USA	Reproductive justice activist. Executive director of SisterSong
	Maryna Viazovska	Ukraine	Mathematician. Winner of the Fields Medal
	Yana Zinkevych	Ukraine	Politician, front-line medical volunteer and military veteran

=== 2021 ===
The 2021 list was published on 7 December with special focus on Afghanistan. The year's keyword is reset, covering women who have contributed to "playing their part to reinvent our society, our culture and our world". The list was subdivided into four categories: Culture & Education, Entertainment & Sport, Politics & Activism and Science & Health, with half the total laureates being Afghan.

Not everyone's real name was used for their safety; pseudonymised laureates are marked in the table below with an asterisk.

==== Culture & Education ====
Image	Name	Country of birth	Description
	Lima Aafshid	Afghanistan	Poet and writer
	Oluyemi Adetiba-Orija	Nigeria	Lawyer and founder of the all-women law firm Headfort Foundation
	Rada Akbar	Afghanistan	Artist
	Catherine Corless	Ireland	Local historian
	Pashtana Durrani	Afghanistan	Teacher, founder and executive director of Learn Afghanistan
	Saeeda Etebari	Afghanistan	Jewellery designer
	Sahar Fetrat	Afghanistan	Feminist activist, writer and film-maker
	Melinda French Gates	United States	Philanthropist and businesswoman
	Saghi Ghahraman	Iran	Poet and co-founder the Iranian Queer Organization
	Angela Ghayour	Afghanistan	Teacher and founder of The Herat Online School
	Najlla Habibyar	Afghanistan	Entrepreneur
	Shamsia Hassani	Afghanistan	Street artist
	Mugdha Kalra	India	Autism-rights activist and co-founder of Not That Different
	Freshta Karim	Afghanistan	Children's-rights activist and founder of Charmaghz mobile library
	Aliya Kazimy	Afghanistan	Educator
	Baroness Helena Kennedy QC	United Kingdom	Director, International Bar Association's Human Rights Institute
	Iman Le Caire	Egypt	Contemporary dancer, choreographer and LGBTQ+ activist. Founder, Trans Asylias
	Depelsha Thomas McGruder	United States	Founder of Moms of Black Boys United, COO of the Ford Foundation
	Fahima Mirzaie	Afghanistan	Whirling-dervish dancer
	Chimamanda Ngozi Adichie	Nigeria	Writer
	Lynn Ngugi	Kenya	Journalist
	Rehana Popal	Afghanistan	Barrister
	*Rohila	Afghanistan	Schoolgirl
	Alba Rueda	Argentina	Trans activist
	Elif Shafak	France	Novelist and advocate for women's and LGBTQ+ rights
	Anisa Shaheed	Afghanistan	Journalist
	Mina Smallman	United Kingdom	Priest and educator
	Barbara Smolińska	Poland	Founder of Reborn Sugar Babies
	Adelaide Lala Tam	China	Artist and food designer
	Vera Wang	United States	Fashion designer
	Malala Yousafzai	Pakistan	Nobel Peace Prize laureate, co-founder of the Malala Fund and girls’ education activist

==== Entertainment & Sport ====
Image	Name	Country of birth	Description
	Halima Aden	Kenya	Humanitarian and former model. UNICEF ambassador for children's rights.
	Leena Alam	Afghanistan	Actor and human-rights activist
	Sevda Altunoluk	Turkey	Professional goalball player and Paralympic champion
	Nilofar Bayat	Afghanistan	Wheelchair basketball player and advocate for women with disabilities
	Carolina García	Argentina	Director, Netflix
	Ghawgha Taban	Afghanistan	Musician
	Chloé Lopes Gomes	France	Ballet dancer
	Tanya Muzinda	Zimbabwe	Motocross champion
	*Razma	Afghanistan	Musician
	Roya Sadat	Afghanistan	Film-maker
	Shogufa Safi	Afghanistan	Orchestra conductor
	*Sahar	Afghanistan	Footballer
	Fatima Sultani	Afghanistan	Mountaineer and martial arts expert
	Nanfu Wang	China	Film-maker
	Ming-Na Wen	Macau (China)	Actor
	Rebel Wilson	Australia	Actress, writer and producer

==== Politics & Activism ====
Image	Name	Country of birth	Description
	Muqadasa Ahmadzai	Afghanistan	Social and political activist. Recipient of N-Peace award
	Abia Akram	Pakistan	Disability rights activist
	Dr Alema	Afghanistan	Philosopher, campaigner and women's-rights advocate
	Wahida Amiri	Afghanistan	Librarian and protester
	Natasha Asghar	United Kingdom	Member of the Welsh Senedd
	Marcelina Bautista	Mexico	Activist and union leader
	Crystal Bayat	Afghanistan	Social activist and human-rights advocate
	Razia Barakzai	Afghanistan	Protester
	Najla El Mangoush	United Kingdom; Libya	Libyan Minister of Foreign Affairs
	Shila Ensandost	Afghanistan	Teacher and women's rights advocate
	Fatima Gailani	Afghanistan	Peace negotiator
	Momena Ibrahimi	Afghanistan	Policewoman
	Hoda Khamosh	Iran	Period campaigner, poet and journalist
	Elisa Loncón Antileo	Chile	President, Constitutional Convention
	*Maral	Afghanistan	Campaigner
	*Masouma	Afghanistan	Public prosecutor
	Fiamē Naomi Mataʻafa	Samoa	Prime minister of the Independent State of Samoa
	Salima Mazari	Iran	Politician and former governor of Charkint district
	Amanda Nguyen	United States	Social entrepreneur, civil-rights activist and founder of Rise
	Basira Paigham	Afghanistan	Gender-equality and gender-minorities activist
	Monica Paulus	Papua New Guinea	Campaigner against sorcery accusation-related violence
	Manjula Pradeep	India	Lawyer and human-rights activist. Executive director of the Navsarjan Trust
	Halima Sadaf Karimi	Afghanistan	Campaigner for women's rights, politician and former MP
	Soma Sara	United Kingdom	Founder of Everyone's Invited
	Mahbouba Seraj	Afghanistan	Women's and children's rights activist. Founder, Afghan Women's Network
	*Ein Soe May	Myanmar	Pro-democracy activist
	Piper Stege Nelson	United States	Women's-rights activist and Public Strategies Officer at The Safe Alliance
	Sister Ann Rose Nu Tawng	Myanmar	Catholic nun
	Emma Theofelus	Namibia	Politician
	Benafsha Yaqoobi	Afghanistan	Disabled rights advocate
	Zala Zazai	Afghanistan	Policewoman

==== Science & Health ====
Image	Name	Country of birth	Description
	Mónica Araya	Costa Rica	Emissions-free transportation advocate
	Zuhal Atmar	Afghanistan	Entrepreneur and founder of Gul-e-Mursal recycling
	Jos Boys	United Kingdom	Architect
	Faiza Darkhani	Afghanistan	Environmentalist and women's rights advocate
	Azmina Dhrodia	Canada	Safety policy lead at Bumble
	Jamila Gordon	Somalia	Chief Executive and founder of Lumachain
	Laila Haidari	Pakistan	Women's rights advocate and founder of Mother Camp, drug rehabilitation centre
	Zarlasht Halaimzai	Afghanistan	Co-founder and chief executive of Refugee Trauma Initiative
	Nasrin Husseini	Afghanistan	Veterinarian
	Amena Karimyan	Afghanistan	Astronomer
	Mia Krisna Pratiwi	Indonesia	Environmentalist and eco-activist
	Heidi Larson	United States	Anthropologist and Director of The Vaccine Confidence Project. Recipient of the Edinburgh Medal
	Sevidzem Ernestine Leikeki	Cameroon	Climate activist
	*Mahera	Afghanistan	Medical doctor
	Mulu Mesfin	Ethiopia	Nurse
	Mohadese Mirzaee	Afghanistan	Pilot
	Tlaleng Mofokeng	South Africa	Universal health access advocate and United Nations special rapporteur on the right to health
	Natalia Pasternak Taschner	Brazil	Microbiologist and science writer
	*Ruksana	Afghanistan	Surgeon
	Sara Wahedi	Afghanistan	Chief executive of Ehtesab
	Roshanak Wardak	Afghanistan	Gynaecologist and former Member of Parliament
	Yuma	Turkmenistan	Psychotherapist and LGBTQ+ activist

=== 2020 ===
The 2020 list was described as "different" before it was scheduled to be announced on 24 November 2020, but it was released the day before. One name on the list was left blank as a tribute to the countless women around the world who had made sacrifices to help others. The list was subdivided into four categories: Knowledge, Leadership, Creativity and Identity.

Image	Name	Country of birth	Description
	Unsung hero	Worldwide	Acknowledgement of the "countless women around the world" who "have made a sacrifice to help others" in this "extraordinary year," including those who "have lost their lives while making a difference."

==== Knowledge ====
Image	Name	Country of birth	Description
	Rina Akter	Bangladesh	Bangladeshi sex worker turned humanitarian
	Sarah Al-Amiri	UAE	Chair, UAE Space Agency
	Adriana Albini	Italy	Pathologist and veteran fencer
	Nisreen Alwan	Iraq United Kingdom	Health and wellbeing of women through public health
	Elizabeth Anionwu	United Kingdom	Sickle cell and thalassaemia nurse specialist
	Diana Barran	United Kingdom	Minister for Civil Society and founder of SafeLives, a national charity dedicated to ending domestic abuse
	Macinley Butson	Australia	Inventor
	Fang Fang	China	Writer
	Somaya Faruqi	Afghanistan	Robotics team leader
	Lauren Gardner	USA	Epidemiologist
	Iman Ghaleb Al-Hamli	Yemen	Manager of a women-run microgrid
	Sarah Gilbert	United Kingdom	Scientist who developed one of the COVID-19 vaccines
	Rebeca Gyumi	Tanzania	Lawyer and founder of girls' rights organization Msichana Initiative
	Jemimah Kariuki	Kenya	Doctor and creator of the free Wheels for Life ambulance service
	Safaa Kumari	Syria	Plant virologist
	Ishtar Lakhani	South Africa	Feminist activist
	Lucy Monaghan	United Kingdom	Campaigner against sexual violence
	Douce Namwezi N'Ibamba	(Democratic Republic of the Congo) DRC	Social entrepreneur, journalist and activist
	Etheldreda Nakimuli-Mpungu	Uganda	Mental health programme developer
	Vernetta M Nay Moberly	United States	Iñupiaq environmental activist
	Sania Nishtar	Pakistan	Global health leader
	Lorna Prendergast	Australia	Dementia researcher
	Susana Raffalli	Venezuela	Delivering nutrition to the malnourished
	Sapana Roka Magar	Nepal	Crematorium technician
	Pardis Sabeti	Iran	Computational geneticist
	Febfi Setyawati	Indonesia	Activist, founder of Untukteman.id
	Ruth Shady	Peru	Archaeologist
	Kathy Sullivan	United States	Scientist and astronaut
	Rima Sultana Rimu	Bangladesh	Teacher and humanitarian activist working with Rohingya refugees
	Anastasia Volkova	Ukraine	Agricultural innovator. Founder of FluroSat
	Siouxsie Wiles	UK	Scientist and public health communicator
	Yee-Sin Leo	Singapore	Doctor and research leader

==== Leadership ====
Image	Name	Country of birth	Description
	Loza Abera Geinore	Ethiopia	Association footballer
	Christina Adane	Netherlands	Campaigner against injustices of food system (free school meals)
	Yvonne Aki-Sawyerr	Sierra Leone	Mayor of Freetown
	Ubah Ali	Somaliland	Advocate against female genital mutilation
	Nadeen Ashraf	Egypt	Advocate against sexual harassment
	Bilkis Dadi	India	Protest leader
	Evelina Cabrera	Argentina	Football coach and manager.
	Carolina Castro	Argentina	Advocate for gender equality
	Agnes Chow	Hong Kong	Pro-democracy activist
	Naomi Dickson	UK	Advocate for Jewish women and children suffering from domestic abuse
	Ilwad Elman	Somalia	Peace activist
	Jeong Eun-kyeong	South Korea	Korea Disease Control and Prevention Agency commissioner, led COVID-19 response
	Maggie Gobran	Egypt	Coptic nun and child welfare advocate
	Deta Hedman	Jamaica	Darts champion
	Manasi Joshi	India	Para-badminton champion
	Salsabila Khairunnisa	Indonesia	Environmental campaigner and School Strike for Climate leader
	Claudia López Hernández	Colombia	Mayor of Bogotá
	Sanna Marin	Finland	Prime Minister of Finland
	Vanessa Nakate	Uganda	Climate activist
	Nemonte Nenquimo	Ecuador	Waorani activist
	Phyllis Omido	Kenya	Environmental activist. Winner of the Goldman Environmental Prize
	Ridhima Pandey	India	Climate activist
	Oksana Pushkina	Russia	Politician, member of the State Duma
	Panusaya Sithijirawattanakul	Thailand	Student activist
	Nasrin Sotoudeh	Iran	Lawyer and human rights activist
	Sviatlana Tsikhanouskaya	Belarus	Exiled Belarus politician
	Arussi Unda	Mexico	Campaigner against femicide
	Aisha Yesufu	Nigeria	Activist, co-convener of the Bring Back Our Girls campaign
	Gulnaz Zhuzbaeva	Kyrgyzstan	Disability activist

==== Creativity ====
Image	Name	Country of birth	Description
	Houda Abouz	Morocco	Rapper, women's rights and gender equality advocate
	Waad al-Kateab	Syria	Activist, journalist and filmmaker
	Tsitsi Dangarembga	Zimbabwe	Novelist and filmmaker
	Karen Dolva	Norway	Chief executive and co-founder of No Isolation
	Jane Fonda	United States	Actor and social activist
	Kiran Gandhi	United States	Singer, musician, and gender liberation activist
	Miho Imada	Japan	Master sake brewer
	Isaivani	India	Gaana singer and political campaigner
	Nadine Kaadan	France	Children's author and illustrator
	Mulenga Kapwepwe	Zambia	Artist and co-founder of the Zambian Women's History Museum
	Jackie Kay	United Kingdom	Playwright, novelist and national poet of Scotland
	Mahira Khan	Pakistan	Actor and activist and UNHCR Goodwill Ambassador
	Angélique Kidjo	Benin	Musician and UNICEF ambassador
	Chu Kim Duc	Vietnam	Architect and child welfare activist
	Zahara	South Africa	Singer songwriter
	Nandar	Myanmar	Feminist activist
	Ana Tijoux	France	Chilean hip hop protester
	Yulia Tsvetkova	Russia	Activist, political prisoner
	Kotchakorn Voraakhom	Thailand	Landscape architect
	Elin Williams	United Kingdom	Disability rights activist
	Michelle Yeoh	Malaysia	Actor and UN goodwill ambassador

==== Identity ====
Image	Name	Country of birth	Description
	Muyesser Abdul'ehed (AKA Hendan)	China	Uyghur writer and language activist
	Erica Baker	Germany	Software engineer
	Cindy Bishop	Thailand	UN goodwill ambassador and model
	Wendy Beatriz Caishpal Jaco	El Salvador	Advocate for the rights of disabled people
	Patrisse Cullors	USA	Human rights activist. Co-founder and executive director of the Black Lives Matter Global Network Foundation
	Shani Dhanda	UK	Disability activist
	Eileen Flynn	Ireland	Senator and social activist
	Alicia Garza	USA	Human rights activist. Co-creator of Black Lives Matter and the Black Lives Matter Global Network
	Uyaiedu Ikpe-Etim	Nigeria	LGBTQ film director and activist
	Gülsüm Kav	Turkey	Doctor, activist, co-founder of We Will Stop Femicide
	Josina Machel	Mozambique	Human rights activist
	Hayat Mirshad	Lebanon	Feminist activist, journalist, co-founder of Fe-Male collective
	Laleh Osmany	Afghanistan	Women's rights activist and founder of #WhereIsMyName campaign
	Cibele Racy	Brazil	Teacher, racial equality activist
	Lea T	Brazil	Transgender rights advocate and model
	Ayu (Opal) Tometi	USA	Human rights activist. Co-founder of Black Lives Matter
	Alice Wong	United States	Disability rights activist. Founder of the Disability Visibility Project

=== 2019 ===
The 2019 list was announced on 16 October 2019. The list of candidates was chosen from those nominated by the BBC's different language teams using the 2020 theme which was "The Female Future". The list was subdivided into six categories: Earth, Knowledge, Leadership, Creativity, Sport and Identity.

==== Earth ====
Image	Name	Country of birth	Description
	Judith Bakirya	Uganda	Organic farmer and women's rights activist
	Ella Daish	United Kingdom	Environmentalist and anti-plastic campaigner
	Katrina Johnston-Zimmerman	United States	Urban anthropologist and co-founder of The Women Led Cities Initiative
	Gada Kadoda	Sudan	Founder of the Sudanese Knowledge Society and trainer of community engineers
	Jamie Margolin	United States	Climate change activist and co-founder of Zero Hour movement
	Francia Márquez	Colombia	Afro-Colombian environmentalist and leader of a 10-day, 350-mile women's march. Winner of the Goldman Environmental Prize
	Trang Nguyen	Vietnam	Wildlife conservationist and founder of WildAct
	Autumn Peltier	Canada	Clean water advocate
	Swietenia Puspa Lestari	Indonesia	Founder of the Divers Clean Action Foundation and anti-straw campaigner
	Charlene Ren	China	Clean water advocate, creator of MyH2O
	Najat Saliba	Lebanon	Air pollution researcher and chemistry professor
	Vandana Shiva	India	Environmental leader and winner of the Alternative Nobel Peace Prize
	Greta Thunberg	Sweden	Climate change activist
	Marilyn Waring	New Zealand	Feminist economist and environmental activist

==== Knowledge ====
Image	Name	Country of birth	Description
	MiMi Aung	United States	NASA project manager and engineer
	Raya Bidshahri	Iran	Educator and founder of Awecademy
	Katie Bouman	United States	Processed first-ever image of a black hole
	Lisa Campo-Engelstein	United States	Bioethicist and fertility and contraceptive researcher
	Rana el Kaliouby	Egypt	Artificial emotional intelligence pioneer. Founder of Affectiva
	Amy Karle	United States	Bioartist and 3D-designer
	Fei-Fei Li	United States	Pioneer of artificial intelligence who encourages women and minorities to build AI.
	Julie Makani	Tanzania	Treatment of Sickle Cell Disease
	Sarah Martins Da Silva	United Kingdom	Consultant gynaecologist, obstetrician and fertility researcher
	Susmita Mohanty	India	Spaceship designer, entrepreneur and passionate climate action advocate
	Benedicte Mundele	Democratic Republic of the Congo	Fresh food entrepreneur and founder of Surprise Tropical
	Zehra Sayers	Turkey	Biophysicist and chair of the SESAME project.
	Hayfa Sdiri	Tunisia	Entrepreneur and UN gender equality campaigner
	Noor Shaker	Syria	Artificial intelligence innovator
	Bonita Sharma	Nepal	Founder of The Social Changemakers and Innovators
	Veronique Thouvenot	Chile	Leader of the Zero Mothers Die initiative
	Paola Villarreal	Mexico	Computer programmer who developed Data for Justice
	Amy Webb	United States	Futurist

==== Leadership ====
Image	Name	Country of birth	Description
	Alanoud Alsharekh	Kuwait	Women's rights activist. Winner of National Order of Merit
	Tabata Amaral	Brazil	Politician working for education, women's rights, political innovation and sustainable futures
	Dhammananda Bhikkhuni	Thailand	First female Thai Buddhist monk (bhikkhuni) and abbess of Songdhammakalyan Monastery
	Mabel Bianco	Argentina	Feminist medical doctor and women's rights activist. President of the Foundation for Studies and Research on Women (FEIM)
	Maria Fernanda Espinosa	Ecuador	Fourth female president of the UN General Assembly
	Sister Gerard Fernandez	Singapore	Roman Catholic nun and death row counsellor
	Zarifa Ghafari	Afghanistan	One of Afghanistan's first female mayors; clean city advocate
	Jalila Haider	Pakistan	Human rights lawyer and women's rights advocate
	Asmaa James	Sierra Leone	Journalist and women's rights activist
	Ahlam Khudr	Sudan	Human rights protest leader
	Aïssata Lam	Mauritania	Microfinance expert and women's rights advocate
	Soo Jung Lee	South Korea	Forensic psychologist and advocate for anti-stalking bill
	Gina Martin	United Kingdom	Campaigner to make upskirting illegal in England and Wales
	Van Thi Nguyen	Vietnam	Co-founder of the Will to Live Center
	Alexandria Ocasio-Cortez	United States	Youngest woman elected to Congress
	Onjali Q. Raúf	United Kingdom	Writer and founder of Making Herstory
	Maria Ressa	Philippines	Journalist and founder of Rappler, a website exposing fake news
	Lyubov Sobol	Russia	Lawyer and anti-corruption activist
	Samah Subay	Yemen	Lawyer supporting families whose children have 'disappeared'

==== Creativity ====
Image	Name	Country of birth	Description
	Precious Adams	United States	Ballet dancer
	Manal Al Dowayan	Saudi Arabia	Saudi photographer and artist
	Marwa Al-Sabouni	Syria	Architect who runs the only Arabic website for architectural news. Winner of the Prince Claus award
	Yalitza Aparicio	Mexico	Actress and human rights activist
	Dayna Ash	Lebanon	Poet and cultural activist
	Ayah Bdeir	Lebanon; Canada	Founder of littleBits and STEM advocate
	Scarlett Curtis	United Kingdom	Co-founder of The Pink Protest
	Luchita Hurtado	Venezuela	Artist and environmental advocate
	Aranya Johar	India	Beat poet who writes about gender equality, mental health and body positivity
	Erika Lust	Sweden	Erotic film director, screenwriter and producer
	Lauren Mahon	United Kingdom	Cancer survivor and podcaster
	Lisa Mandemaker	Netherlands	Designer of prototype artificial womb
	Raja Meziane	Algeria	Anti-government songs about social injustice, alleged corruption and inequality
	Ashcharya Peiris	Sri Lanka	Blind fashion designer and motivational speaker
	Danit Peleg	Israel	Fashion designer of 3D-printed clothing
	Kalista Sy	Senegal	Screenwriter of television series Mistress of a Married Man
	Ida Vitale	Uruguay	Poet, and fifth woman to win Cervantes Prize for lifetime writing achievement

==== Sport ====
Image	Name	Country of birth	Description
	Jasmin Akter	Bangladesh; United Kingdom	Rohingya refugee and cricketer
	Kimia Alizadeh	Iran	First female Iranian Olympic medallist
	Dina Asher-Smith	United Kingdom	Fastest woman in British history
	Salwa Eid Naser	Nigeria; Bahrain	400m world champion runner
	Bethany Firth	United Kingdom	Paralympic champion swimmer
	Shelly-Ann Fraser-Pryce	Jamaica	100m world sprint champion
	Tayla Harris	Australia	Australian rules footballer and boxer
	Huang Wensi	China	Professional boxer
	Fiona Kolbinger	Germany	First woman cyclist to win the Transcontinental Race
	Hiyori Kon	Japan	Sumo wrestler
	Farida Osman	Egypt	First woman in Egypt to win a swimming medal
	Megan Rapinoe	United States	World Cup winner and advocate for equality in football (soccer)
	Jawahir Roble	Somalia; United Kingdom	UK's first Muslim, black, female, hijab-wearing referee

==== Identity ====
Image	Name	Country of birth	Description
	Parveena Ahanger	India	Human rights activist
	Piera Aiello	Italy	Anti-mafia politician
	Rida Al Tubuly	Libya	Peace campaigner
	Nisha Ayub	Malaysia	Transgender activist
	Sinéad Burke	Ireland	Disability activist
	Sharan Dhaliwal	United Kingdom	Writer and advocate for mental and sexual health for young South Asians, and LGBTQ rights
	Lucinda Evans	South Africa	Women's rights activist and founder of Philisa Abafazi Bethu (Heal our Women)
	Owl Fisher	Iceland	Transgender activist, journalist and writer
	Hollie	United States	Sex trafficking survivor
	Yumi Ishikawa	Japan	Gender discrimination campaigner and founder of KuToo movement
	Subhalakshmi Nandi	India	Gender equity researcher and campaigner
	Natasha Noel	India	Body positivity influencer and Yogini
	Djamila Ribeiro	Brazil	Writer and Afro-Brazilian women's rights advocate
	Nanjira Sambuli	Kenya	World Wide Web Foundation digital equality expert
	Pragati Singh	India	Doctor running Indian Aces, an online community for asexual people
	Bella Thorne	United States	Actress and director
	Purity Wako	Uganda	Life coach empowering women
	Sara Wesslin	Finland	Skolt Sami journalist who lobbied for government funding for Sami language teaching
	Gina Zurlo	United States	Expert in religion statistics

=== 2018 ===
The 2018 list was announced in November 2018. The list included the 27th Australian Prime Minister Julia Gillard, Stacey Cunningham who runs the New York Stock Exchange and Shaparak Shajarizadeh who challenged the Iranian law that requires women to wear the Hijab.

Image	Name	Country of birth	Description
	Abisoye Ajayi-Akinfolarin	Nigeria	Social impact entrepreneur
	Esra'a Al Shafei	Bahrain	Leads not-for-profit Majal.org
	Svetlana Alekseeva	Russia	Model and burns survivor
	Lizt Alfonso	Cuba	Director and choreographer, Cuba
	Nimco Ali	United Kingdom; Somaliland	Writer and FGM activist
	Isabel Allende	Peru	Author
	Boushra Yahya Almutawakel	Yemen	Artist, photographer and activist
	Alina Anisimova	Kyrgyzstan	Student programmer at Kyrgyz Girls' Space School
	Frances Arnold	United States	Nobel Prize winning chemical engineer
	Uma Devi Badi	Nepal	Leader of the Badi movement and member of the Provincial Assembly in Nepal
	Judith Balcazar	United Kingdom	Fashion designer and co-founder of Giggle Knickers (underwear for women with urinary incontinence)
	Cindy Arlette Contreras Bautista	Peru	Lawyer who works against domestic violence as the face of the NiUnaMenos (Not One [woman] Less)
	Leyla Belyanova	Uzbekistan	Academic and ecologist, seeking to protect Uzbekistan's birdlife and mountain ecosystems
	Analia Bortz	Argentina	Doctor, rabbi and bioethicist treating women with fertility problems
	Fealofani Bruun	Samoa	Traditional Polynesian navigator and qualified yachtmaster
	Raneen Bukhari	Saudi Arabia	Curator, gallery manager, and business developer
	Joy Buolamwini	Canada	Artificial intelligence artist and researcher
	Barbara Burton	United Kingdom	Founder and CEO of BehindBras, a charity that supports women prison leavers
	Tamara Cheremnova	Russia	Author, living with cerebral palsy
	Chelsea Clinton	United States	Writer and organiser, Vice-chair of the Clinton Foundation
	Stacey Cunningham	United States	NYSE President
	Jenny Davidson	United States	CEO of Stand Up Placer
	Asha de Vos	Sri Lanka	Marine biologist
	Gabriella Di Laccio	Brazil	Soprano and founder of DONNE: Women in Music
	Xiomara Diaz	Nicaragua	Entrepreneur, restaurant owner and charity founder
	Noma Dumezweni	United Kingdom; Eswatini	Actor
	Chidera Eggerue	United Kingdom	"The Slumflower" blogger
	Shrouk El-Attar	Egypt	Electronic design engineer
	Nicole Evans	New Zealand	Online retail sales facilitator and supporter of women who are experiencing Early menopause
	Raghda Ezzeldin	Egypt	Free diver
	Mitra Farazandeh	Iran	Artist advocate for people with physical disabilities
	Mamitu Gashe	Ethiopia	Senior nurse aide and fistula surgeon
	Meena Gayen	India	Business owner and road builder
	G.E.M. (Gloria Tang Tsz-kei)	China; Hong Kong	Singer-songwriter
	Fabiola Gianotti	Italy	Particle physicist and director general of CERN
	Julia Gillard	Australia	27th Prime Minister of Australia
	Elena Gorolová	Czech Republic	Social worker, campaigning against forced sterilisation
	Randi Heesoo Griffin	United States	Olympic ice hockey player and data scientist, advocate for equal pay for women in ice hockey
	Janet Harbick	Canada	Altruistic surrogate
	Jessica Hayes	United States	Theology teacher and consecrated virgin
	Thando Hopa	South Africa	Model, lawyer and diversity and inclusion advocate
	Hindou Oumarou Ibrahim	Chad	Environmentalist and advocate for indigenous people and women
	Reyhan Jamalova	Azerbaijan	Entrepreneur, founder and CEO of Rainenergy, company that collects energy from rainwater
	Jameela Jamil	United Kingdom	British actor who founded @i-weigh
	Liz Johnson	United Kingdom	Paralympian gold medal swimmer and entrepreneur, with a recruitment agency aiming to close the disability employment gap
	Lao Khang	Laos	Rugby player and coach
	Joey Mead King	Philippines	Model and television presenter
	Krishna Kumari	Pakistan	Women's rights campaigner elected to Pakistan Senate
	Marie Laguerre	France	Civil engineer and architecture student, who has developed platform where women can share stories of street harassment
	Veasna Chea Leth	Cambodia	Lawyer, first woman to study law in Cambodia
	Ana Graciela Sagastume López	El Salvador	Women and Femicide Special Prosecutor
	Maria Corina Machado	Venezuela	Political leader who has campaigned to safeguard democratic processes in Venezuela
	Nanaia Mahuta	New Zealand	Minister of Maori development, first female parliamentarian to wear a Maori face tattoo
	Sakdiyah Ma'ruf	Indonesia	Indonesia's first female Muslim stand-up comedian
	Nujeen Mustafa	Syria	Syrian refugee, activist, and a campaigner on behalf of refugees with disabilities
	Lisa McGee	United Kingdom	Northern Irish playwright and the writer and creator of Derry Girls
	Kirsty McGurrell	United Kingdom	Charity co-ordinator of 4Louis, providing memory boxes for bereaved parents of stillborn babies
	Becki Meakin	United Kingdom	General manager of Shaping Our Lives, advocate for people with disabilities
	Ruth Medufia	Ghana	Female welder acting as role model for young women in the construction industry
	Larisa Mikhaltsova	Ukraine	Accordion music teacher who became a model at age 63
	Amina J. Mohammed	Nigeria	Deputy secretary general, United Nations
	Yanar Mohammed	Iraq	President of the Organization of Women's Freedom in Iraq (OWFI)
	Joseline Esteffania Velasquez Morales	Guatemala	Student and NGO co-ordinator, campaigning to end forced marriages
	Robin Morgan	United States	Author and activist, founder of The Sisterhood is Global Institute and the Women's Media Center
	Dima Nashawi	Syria	Artist, clown and visual storyteller, who collects and reflects tales from Syria
	Helena Ndume	Namibia	Ophthalmologist who has performed sight-restoring surgeries upon 35,000 Namibians, free of charge
	Kelly O'Dwyer	Australia	Minister for jobs and industrial relations, and minister for women in the Australian parliament
	Yuki Okoda	Japan	Astronomer, first person to discover a new star that could shed light on the origins of the Solar System
	Olivette Otele	Cameroon	Professor of History at Bath Spa University, England
	Claudia Sheinbaum Pardo	Mexico	Mayor of Mexico City and Nobel Peace Prize-winning physicist
	Park Soo-yeon	South Korea	Digital campaigner against sex crimes
	Ophelia Pastrana	Colombia	Comedian and media personality
	Viji Palithodi	India	Activist who founded the Penkootam women's union in Kerala
	Brigitte Sossou Perenyi	Ghana	Documentary producer and former Trokosi
	Vicky Phelan	Ireland	Exposed the Irish Cervical Check Screening scandal
	Rahibai Soma Popere	India	Farmer and founder of Seed Bank, India collecting indigenous seeds
	Valentina Quintero	Venezuela	Journalist promoting tourism and the environment through television programs
	Sam Ross	United Kingdom	Catering assistant and advocate for people with Down syndrome
	Fatma Samoura	Senegal	Secretary General of FIFA
	Juliet Sargeant	Tanzania	Garden designer
	Sima Sarkar	Bangladesh	Full-time mother of 18-year-old disabled child
	Shaparak Shajarizadeh	Iran	Activist against compulsory hijab rule, now in exile
	Haven Shepherd	Vietnam	Suicide bomb survivor and Paralympic hopeful
	Nenney Shushaidah Binti Shamsuddin	Malaysia	Female Syariah judge
	Hayat Sindi	Saudi Arabia	Biotechnologist, Unesco Goodwill Ambassador for science and founder of the i2 Institute for imagination and ingenuity
	Jacqueline Straub	Germany	Theologian, journalist and author seeking to become a Catholic priest
	Donna Strickland	Canada	Professor of Physics, University of Waterloo, Canada and winner of Nobel Prize in Physics, 2018
	Kanpassorn Suriyasangpetch	Thailand	Dentist, mental health advocate and app developer
	Setsuko Takamizawa	Japan	Learning English to help tourists at Tokyo's 2020 Olympic Games
	Nargis Taraki	Afghanistan	NGO legal adviser who campaigns for female empowerment
	Ellen Tejle	Sweden	Campaigner for awareness of women's representation in film
	Helen Taylor Thompson	United Kingdom	AIDs Hospice founder
	Bola Tinubu	Nigeria	Lawyer who established the first free children's helpline in Nigeria
	Errollyn Wallen	United Kingdom; Belize	Opera composer and Ivor Novello Award winner
	Safiya Wazir	Afghanistan	Community activist and U.S. politician
	Gladys West	United States	Mathematician, instrumental in developing GPS
	Luo Yang	China	Art photography series on Chinese girls since 2007
	Maral Yazarloo-Pattrick	Iran	Fashion designer and motorcyclist
	Tashi Zangmo	Bhutan	Executive director for the Bhutan Nuns Foundation
	Jing Zhao	China	Entrepreneur running online sex education network

=== 2017 ===
In 2017 the women on the list were part of a 100 Women Challenge, tackling some of the biggest problems facing women around the world. Coming together in four teams, the women shared their experiences and created innovative ways to tackle:

- The glass ceiling (#Teamlead)
- Female illiteracy (#Teamread)
- Street harassment (#Teamgo)
- Sexism in sport (#Teamplay)

==== Glass ceiling team ====
Image	Name	Country of birth	Description
	Agnes Atim Apea	Uganda	Founder and CEO of Hope Co-ops
	Amy Cuddy	United States	Harvard social psychologist and author
	Elaine Welteroth	United States	Editor-in-chief of Teen Vogue
	Erin Akinci	United States	Data scientist
	Jin Xing	China	Dancer, television star and business owner
	Karlie Noon	Australia	Astronomer
	Lea Coligado	United States	Software engineer
	Lori Nishiura Mackenzie	United States	Executive Director of the Clayman Institute, Stanford University
	Loujain Alhathloul	Saudi Arabia	Student
	Maci Peterson	United States	Co-founder and CEO, On Second Thought
	Mariana Feraru	Romania	Cosmetician
	María Teresa Ruiz	Chile	Astronomer
	Marilyn Loden	United States	Author, management consultant and diversity advocate
	Marina Potoker	Russia	Managing director, Rockwool Russia
	Melisa Marquez-Rodriguez	Puerto Rico	Lead Android engineer for website builder, Weebly.com
	Michelle Mone	United Kingdom	Entrepreneur
	Muhabbat Sharapova	Uzbekistan	Maths teacher
	Nana Akua Oppong Birmeh	Ghana	Architect
	Natalia Margolis	United States	Software Engineer at Huge agency
	Romina Bernardo (aka Chocolate Remix)	Argentina	Musician
	Roya Ramezani	Iran	Design strategist
	Rumman Chowdhury	United States	Senior Principal at Accenture AI
	Sasha Perigo	United States	Student
	Savita Devi	India	Drummer
	Susi Pudjiastuti	Indonesia	Politician and entrepreneur
	Suzanne Doyle-Morris	Australia	Author and expert on gender in the workplace

==== Women illiteracy team ====
Image	Name	Country of birth	Description
	Aditi Avasthi	India	Entrepreneur; Founder and CEO, Embibe
	Huỳnh Thị Xậm	Vietnam	Librarian
	Indira Rana Magar	Nepal	Founder, Prisoner's Assistance Nepal
	Ira Trivedi	India	Writer
	Maggie MacDonnell	Canada	Teacher
	Marieme Jamme	Senegal	Founder of iamtheCODE
	Mehroonisa Siddiqui	India	Homemaker
	Michelle Bachelet	Chile	President of Chile
	Nitya Thummalachetty	India	Director of Diversity, FortunaPIX
	Peggy Whitson	United States	Astronaut
	Priyanka Roy	India	Student
	Sakena Yacoobi	Afghanistan	CEO of Afghan Institute for Learning and social entrepreneur with four private schools and one radio station.
	Tulika Kiran	India	Teacher and social worker
	Urvashi Sahni	India	Founder and CEO, Study Hall Educational Foundation
	Zainab Fadhal	Iraq	Student
	Vicky Colbert	Colombia	Sociologist of education
	Muzoon Almellehan	Syria	Activist and UNICEF Goodwill Ambassador
	Lin Nien-Tzu	Taiwan	Founder, Dharti Mata Sustainable Workshop
	Frances Melanie Hardinge	United Kingdom	Author
	Ngozi Okonjo-Iweala	Nigeria	Economist
	Ahlam al-Rashid	Syria	Teacher and Head of the Women Empowerment Centre, northern Syria
	Regina Honu	Ghana	Social entrepreneur
	Angeline Murimirwa	Zimbabwe	Regional executive director, Camfed Southern & Eastern Africa
	Bella Devyatkina	Russia	Polyglot
	Trần Thị Kim Thia	Vietnam	Lottery ticket vendor and swimming coach

==== Street harassment team ====
Image	Name	Country of birth	Description
	Adelle Onyango	Kenya	Radio presenter
	Anita Nderu	Kenya	Television presenter and radio news anchor at Capital FM
	Anne-Marie Imafidon	United Kingdom	CEO & 'Head Stemette' at Stemettes
	Chaima Lahsini	Morocco	Journalist
	Ellen Johnson Sirleaf	Liberia	President of Liberia
	Ellie Cosgrave	United Kingdom	Lecturer in Urban Innovation and Policy at UCL
	Laura Jordan Bambach	Australia	Co-founder & Chief Creative Officer, Mr President and co-founder, SheSays
	Liz Kelly	United Kingdom	Professor of Sexualised Violence
	Maria Scorodinschi	Moldova	Campaigner against domestic violence
	Naomi Mwaura	Kenya	Founder, Flone Initiative and Communications Associate at ITDP Africa
	Resham Khan	United Kingdom	Student
	Rupi Kaur	India	Author
	Talent Jumo	Zimbabwe	Founder and Director, Katswe Sistahood
	Tiwa Savage	Nigeria	Singer-songwriter
	Virali Modi	India	Disability rights activist and youth ambassador
	Leila Smith	France	Artist
	Sharon Sabita Beepath	Trinidad and Tobago	Counsellor, Stand Against Abuse advocate
	Amanda Nunez-Ferreira	United States	Student
	Somporn Khempetch	Thailand	Social worker and teacher
A women with curly red hair stands in front of a pink brick wall.	Tamara De Anda	Mexico	Journalist
	Doris Muthoni Wanjira	Kenya	Conductor
	Hanne Bingle	Denmark	Powerlifter and retired London Underground driver
	Nihal Saad Zaghloul	Egypt	Business development officer and co-founder of Bassma
	Angie Ng	Canada	Founder of SlutWalk Hong Kong
	Asena Melisa Saglam	Turkey	Student

==== Sexism in sport team ====
Image	Name	Country of birth	Description
	Adriana Behar	Brazil	General Manager of Sport Planning for the Brazilian Olympic Committee
	Ana Luiza Santos de Andrade	Brazil	Student
	Beatriz Vaz E Silva	Brazil	Athlete and Footballer
	Claudianny Drika	Brazil	Football coach
	Fernanda Nunes	Brazil	Olympic rower and blogger
	Grace Larsen	United States	Retired civil servant
	Luiza Travassos	Brazil	Student
	Maíra Liguori	Brazil	Director of NGO, Think Olga
	MC Soffia	Brazil	Rapper
	Mithali Raj	India	Cricketer
	Momina Mustehsan	Pakistan	Musician
	Nadia Comaneci	Romania; United States	Olympic gymnast
	Nawaal Akram	Qatar	Model, comedian and founder of Muscular Dystrophy Qatar
	Nora Tausz Ronai	Italy	Architect and teacher
	Steph Houghton	United Kingdom	Footballer
	Jayanthi Kuru-Utumpala	Sri Lanka	Women's rights activist and mountaineer
	Cwengekile Nikiwe Myeni	South Africa	Gogo (granny) support programme manager
	Helena Pacheco	Brazil	Businesswoman and former football coach
	Rocky Hehakaija	Netherlands	Director of Favela Street Foundation and coach
	Lina Khalifeh	Jordan	Martial arts expert
	Nguyễn Thị Tuyết Dung	Vietnam	Footballer
	Derartu Tulu	Ethiopia	Long-distance runner
	Shantona Rani Roy	Bangladesh	Taekwondo athlete and activist
	Hou Yifan	China	Chess grandmaster

=== 2016 ===
The 2016 theme was Defiance. Part of the 100 Women festival took place in Mexico City on this year. The main event took place at the Palacio de Bellas Artes, where artists like Julieta Venegas, Ángela Aguilar, Ali Gua Gua, Elis Paprika, Sofía Niño de Rivera, Ximena Sariñana, and Alexis De Anda performed live. The event also features debates with journalists Carmen Aristegui, and Denise Dresser, among others. The 2016 list was published in alphabetical order, but split by category into Creative, Defiant, Influential, Pioneering and Resilient with 20 women in each stream.

==== Creative ====
Image	Name	Nationality	Description
	Babs Forman	United Kingdom	London based make-up artist who covers up skin problems
	Conchi Reyes Rios	Spain	Bullfighter
	Doaa el-Adl	Egypt	Cartoonist whose cat stories reflect the news
	Dwi Handa	Indonesia	Instagram fashion star
	Funke Bucknor-Obruthe	Nigeria	Planner of glitzy and celebrity weddings
	Gcina Mhlope	South Africa	Author, poet, playwright and storyteller
	Heloise Letissier	France	French singer and songwriter known by her stage name Christine and the Queens
	Isabella Springmuhl Tejada	Guatemala	Fashion designer
	Jeanette Winterson	United Kingdom	novelist
	Kartika Jahja	Indonesia	gender-equality singer
	Liv Little	United Kingdom	Editor-in-chief at gal-dem
	Mariana Costa Checa	Peru	Businesswoman, founder of Laboratoria
	Nadia Khiari	Tunisia	Creator of cartoon character 'Willis from Tunis', whose adventures reflect the news
	Nadiya Hussain	United Kingdom	Winner of reality show "The Great British Bake Off" – went on to television jobs
	Nay el-Rahi	Lebanon	Journalist, and co-founder of HarassTracker.org
	Ou Xiaobai	People's Republic of China	Relocation manager and co-developer iHomo app which links gay and lesbian people for marriages of convenience
	Paula Hawkins	Zimbabwe	Writer of the novel "The Girl on the Train"
	Prathiba Parmar	Kenya	British film maker
	Reham el-Hour	Morocco	Cartoonist who became professional after winning a UNESCO competition in 2000
	Sunny Leone	Canada	Actress

==== Defiant ====
Image	Name	Nationality	Description
	Amna Suleiman	Palestine	Teacher and bike protester against custom that stops women cycling in Gaza
	Amy Roko	Saudi Arabia	Comedian who became known via Instagram and Vine
	Cat Hulbert	United States	Professional gambler
	Corinne Maier	France	Writer and psychoanalyst
	Denise Ho	Canada Hong Kong	Singer and pro-democracy campaigner
	Ieshia Evans	United States	Nurse and protestor who became an icon of the Black Lives Matter movement following the publication of Taking a Stand in Baton Rouge
	Iskra Lawrence	United Kingdom	Model
	Jamilah Lemieux	United States	Cultural commentator, editor and columnist for Interactive One
	Janet Ní Shuilleabháin	Ireland	Founding member, Abortion Rights Campaign
	June Eric-Udorie	United Kingdom	Writer and blogger
	Lois Strong	United States	Former college maths professor and present day cheerleader
	Naema Ahmed	Pakistan	E-commerce start-up manager
	Neha Singh	India	Actor, writer and campaigner who encourages women to ignore harassment and reclaim the public space
	Renee Rabinowitz	Belgium	Lawyer who sued El Al when she was asked to move as the man next to her objected to sitting beside a female
	Seyhan Arman	Turkey	Transgender activist and actor
	Tess Asplund	Sweden	Care worker and anti-fascism activist caught in iconic photo resisting fascists
	Viktoria Modesta	Latvia	Bionic pop artist
	Winnie Harlow	Canada	Model
	Yuliya Stepanova	Russia	Whistle-blowing athlete
	Zulaikha Patel	South Africa	Thirteen year-old who took stand for young girls with natural hair

==== Influential ====
Image	Name	Nationality	Description
	Alicia Keys	United States	Singer-songwriter
	Aline Mukovi Neema	Republic of the Congo	Student activist for political change
	Carmen Aristegui	Mexico	journalist
	Egge Kande	Senegal	Community leader who advises young girls about education
	Evelyn Miralles	Venezuela	NASA computer engineer
	Heather Rabbatts	Jamaica	Lawyer and businesswoman. Non-executive member of the boards of Grosvenor Estates, Royal Opera House and The FA. Chief Executive of the London Borough of Lambeth
	Judi Aubel	United States	Social entrepreneur
	Liliane Landor	Lebanon	BBC journalist
	Lubna Tahtamouni	Jordan	Biology professor and science campaigner
	Mallika Srinivasan	India	CEO of Tractors and Farm Equipment Limited
	Maria Zakharova	Russia	Foreign ministry spokeswoman
	Marne Levine	United States	Chief Operating Officer, Instagram
	Marta Vieira da Silva	Brazil	Footballer
	Rachida Dati	France	Politician
Rakeft Russak-Aminoach	Rakefet Russak-Aminoach	Israel	CEO, Bank Leumi
	Rebecca Walker	United States	Writer and activist
	Shriti Vadera	Uganda	Banker and economist
	Simone Biles	United States	Olympic gymnast
	Thuli Madonsela	South Africa	Advocate who combats corruption
	Zoleka Mandela	South Africa	Writer – survivor of addictions, sexual abuse and cancer. Granddaughter of Nelson Mandela.

==== Pioneering ====
Image	Name	Nationality	Description
	Asel Sadyrova	Kyrgyzstan	Archer
	Chan Yuen-ting	Hong Kong	Football manager
	Chanira Bajracharya	Nepal	Former "living goddess" or Kumari
	Churan Zheng	People's Republic of China	Women's rights activist arrested for planning protest against sexual harassment on public transportation
	Cindy Meston	Canada	Professor of clinical psychology
	Ellinah Ntombi Wamukoya	Eswatini	First woman to become a bishop of the Anglican Church of Southern Africa
	Erin McKenney	United States	Science award winner
	Gouri Chindarkar	India	Computer engineering student of the "School in the Cloud"
	Jane Elliott	United States	Educator, author and anti-racism activist
	Katherine Johnson	United States	Space scientist who was a mathematician for NASA
	Lhakpa Sherpa	Nepal	Mountaineer who has climbed Mount Everest seven times.
	Lucy Finch	Malawi	Palliative care nurse and founder of Malawi's only hospice
	Mary Akrami	Afghanistan	Women's shelter director and founder of refuge for abused women
	Megan Beveridge	United Kingdom Scotland	First female "lone piper" at the Royal Edinburgh Military Tattoo
	Omotade Alalade	Nigeria	Founder of BeiBei Haven Foundation, helping those struggling with infertility
	Sherin Khankan	Denmark	Imam
	Shirin Gerami	Iran	First "Ironwoman" triathlete in Iran
	Sian Williams	United Kingdom Wales	Rugby player
	Stephanie Harvey	Canada	Professional e-gamer "missharvey"
	Yasmine Mustafa	Kuwait	Entrepreneur, CEO of ROAR for Good

==== Resilient ====
Image	Name	Nationality	Description
	Ashwaq Moharram	Yemen	Doctor dealing with starvation in Hudaydah
	Becci Wain	United Kingdom	Healthcare assistant and former self-harmer who challenged supermarket policy
	Carolina de Oliveira	Lebanon Syria	Actor and Mental health activist
	Dalia Sabri	Jordan	Blind music teacher
	Erin Sweeny	Australia	Psychologist
	Karima Baloch	Pakistan (Balochistan)	Balochistan independence campaigner; died under suspicious circumstances in 2020
	Kathy Murray	United States	Relationship coach and co-author of "Surrendered Wives Empowered Women"
	Khadija Ismayilova	Azerbaijan	Journalist
	Mao Kobayashi	Japan	Newsreader and cancer blogger
	Marta Sánchez Soler	Mexico	Sociologist, activist and President of the Mesoamerican Migrant Movement
	'Mary'	Kenya	Survivor of al-Shabab rape
	Mercedes Doretti	Argentina	Forensic anthropologist who investigates crimes against humanity
	Morena Herrera	El Salvador	Philosopher and Abortion activist
	Nagira Sabashova	Kyrgyzstan	Wrestler
	Natalia Ponce de Leon	Colombia	Human rights activist and acid attack victim
	Pashtun Rahmat	Afghanistan	Police officer
	Saalumarada Thimmakka	India	105-year-old environmentalist
	Stephanie Yim Bell	United States	Korean-American professional wrestler, then known as Jade
	Traci Houpapa	New Zealand	Company director
	Um-Yehia	Syria	Nurse

=== 2015 ===
The BBC News 100 Women list in 2015 was made up of many notable international names, as well as women who were unknown, but who represented issues women face. This year the list focussed on octogenarians sharing life lessons; 'good girl' film-makers discussing expectations; nursing; five high-profile women; and '30 under 30' entrepreneurs.

The women of 2015, were from 51 countries and were not necessarily those who would traditionally have been seen as role models—a woman with depression, a woman who advocates for equal access to bathroom facilities, a woman who encourages other women to avoid make-up, and a reindeer nomad.

==== The 100 Women interviews (five high-profile women) ====
Image	Name	Country	Occupation
	Fatou Bensouda	Gambia	Chief Prosecutor, International Criminal Court (ICC)
	Bobbi Brown	United States	Make-up artist and entrepreneur
	Sania Mirza	India	Tennis player
	Hilary Swank	United States	Actress
	Alek Wek	United Kingdom South Sudan	Fashion model/UN ambassador

==== 30 under 30 entrepreneurs ====
Image	Name	Country	Occupation
	Antonia Albert	Austria	Founder, Careship
	Victoria Alonsoperez	Uruguay	Co-founder, ieeTECH
	Paulina Arreola	Mexico	CEO and co-founder, Lavadero
	Meryl Benitah	France	Founder, La Boite Qui Cartonne
	Leimin Duong	Australia	Founder, Zeven Lemon Beerworks
	Elissa Freiha	United Arab Emirates Sudan	Co-founder, WOMENA
	Melanie Goldsmith	United Kingdom	Founder, Smith and Sinclair
	Sara Jane Ho	Hong Kong	Founder, Institute Sarita
	Samantha John	United States	CTO and co-founder of Hopscotch
	Linda Kwamboka	Kenya	Co-founder, MFarm Ltd
	Zihan Ling	People's Republic of China	CEO and founder, TechBase
	Catherine Mahugu	Kenya	Founder, Soko
	Karabo Mathang	South Africa	South Africa's first female Fifa-accredited soccer agent
	Brit Morin	United States	CEO and founder, Brit + Co
	Smriti Nagpal	India	Founder, Atulyakala
	Pauline Ng	Singapore	Co-founder, Porcelain
	Bel Pesce	Brazil	Founder, FazINOVA
	Elsa Prieto	France Spain	Technical director and co-founder, Pili Pop
	Cristina Randall	Canada	Founder, Conekta
	Claire Reid	South Africa	Entrepreneur, Reel Gardening
	Nikita Ridgeway	Australia	CEO and founder, Dreamtime Ink Australia
	Lorrana Scarpioni	Brazil	Founder, Bliive
	Rasha Shehada	Palestine	Managing director, Diamond Line FZE
	Zuzanna Stańska	Poland	Entrepreneur, creator of DailyArt app
	Michelle Sun	Hong Kong	Founder, First Code Academy
	Julie Sygiel	United States	Founder, Dear Kate
	Kanika Tekriwal	India	CEO and founder, JetsetGo
	Lizanne Teo	Singapore	Co-founder, Upsurge
	Jana Tepe	Germany	CEO and founder, Tandemploy
	Xian Xu (entrepreneur)	People's Republic of China	Co-founder, Cuisines Sous Vide restaurant chain

==== 'Good girl' film-makers ====
Image	Name	Country	Occupation
	Naomi Bya'Ombe	Republic of the Congo	Student
	Massiel Chávez	Venezuela	Student
	Ayesha Ishtiaq	Pakistan	Student
	Delaney Osborne	United States	Student
	Lubov Russkina	Russia	Reindeer nomad
	Nour (pseudonym)	Syria	Refugee

==== Vintage ladies (octogenarians) ====
Image	Name	Country	Occupation
	Nawal el-Sadaawi	Egypt	Writer
	Kamini Kaushal	India	Bollywood actress
	Jenni Rhodes	United Kingdom	Textile designer
	Louise Schwartz (showgirl)	Jamaica	Showgirl and cabaret performer
	Tin Tin Yu (teacher)	Myanmar	Retired teacher

==== Nurses ====
Image	Name	Country	Occupation
	Eveles Chimala	Malawi	Midwife
	Aissa Edon	France Mali	Midwife
	Azza Jadalla	Palestine	Nurse
	Misraa Jimaa	Ethiopia	Health extension worker
	Tina Lavender	United Kingdom	Midwife
	Marie-Ange Zimndou Koutou	Central African Republic	Nurse's aide in a war zone

==== Further inspiration ====
Image	Name	Country	Occupation
	Nicola Adams	United Kingdom	Boxer
	Muzzon al-Mellehan	Syria	Activist
	Siba Alaradi	Syria	Structural engineer
	Sonita Alizadeh	Afghanistan	Rapper
	Niloufar Ardalan	Iran	Footballer
	Masoumeh Ataei	Iran	Acid attack survivor
	Xyza Bacani	Pillippines	Photographer
	Alimata Bara	Burkino Faso	Trader
	Sana Ben Ashour	Tunisia	Civil society activist
	Nicola Benedetti	United Kingdom	Musician
	Asha Bhosle	India	Singer
	Cecilia Bouzat	Argentina	Biophysicist
	Rivka Carmi	Israel	Geneticist
	Estela de Carlotto	Argentina	Human rights activist
	Nkosazana Dlamini-Zuma	South Africa	Physician and chair of the African Union Commission
	Isabel dos Santos	Angola	Investor
	Ernestina Edem Appiah	Ghana	Social entrepreneur and founder, Ghana Code Club
	Jana Elhassan	Lebanon	Novelist
	Paula Escobar	Chile	Magazine editor
	Monir Farmanfarmaian	Iran	Artist
	Claire Fox	United Kingdom	Writer and broadcaster
	Uta Frith	Germany	Psychologist
	Alina Gracheva	Moldova	Camerawoman
	Megan Grano	United States	Comedian
	Alice Gray	United Kingdom	Science blogger
	Michaela Hollywood	United Kingdom	Fundraiser for disabled people
	Ella Ingram (activist)	Australia	Activist for mental illness anti-discrimination
	Somayya Jabarti	Saudi Arabia	Newspaper editor, Saudi Gazette
	Tahmina Kohistani	Afghanistan	Olympic sprinter
	Rimppi Kumari	India	Farmer
	Zimasa Mabela	South Africa	Naval captain
	Emi Mahmoud	Sudan United States	Poet
	Amara Majeed	United States	Hijab activist and author
	Nemata Majeks-Walker	Sierra Leone	Women's rights activist
	Katrine Marcal	Sweden	Economist, writer and journalist
	Muniba Mazari	Pakistan	Artist and anchorwoman
	Jessy McCabe	United Kingdom	Student
	Verashni Pillay	South Africa	Newspaper editor, Mail & Guardian
	Irina Polyakova	Russia	Paralympian
	Neyda Rojas	Venezuela	Nun
	Rabia Salihu Said	Nigeria	Physicist
	Amina Sboui	Tunisia	Writer and women's rights activist
	Patricia Scotland, Baroness Scotland of Asthal	United Kingdom	Trade envoy
	Mumtaz Shaikh	India	Human rights activist
	Nareen Shammo	Iraq	Political activist and journalist
	Rotana Tarabzouni	Saudi Arabia	Singer/songwriter
	Li Tingting	People's Republic of China	Human rights activist
	Sophie Walker	United Kingdom	Leader of the Women's Equality Party

=== 2014 ===
The BBC News 100 Women list in 2014 continued the efforts of the first year's initiative.

Image	Name	Country	Occupation
	Dr Yasmin Altwaijri	Saudi Arabia	Mental health and obesity scientist
	Conchita Wurst	Austria	Singer
	Laura Bates	United Kingdom	Founder, Everyday Sexism project
	Pinky Lilani	United Kingdom	Founder, Asian Women of Achievement Awards
	Ruby Chakravarti	India	Women's rights campaigner
	Susie Orbach	United Kingdom	Psychotherapist
	Pontso Mafethe	Zimbabwe	Women's programme manager, Comic Relief
	Kate Shand	United Kingdom	Managing director of Enjoy Education
	Shappi Khorsandi	United Kingdom	Comedian
	Shazia Saleem	United Kingdom	Founder ieat Foods
	Wai Wai Nu	Myanmar	Director, Women Peace Net
	Michaela Bergman	United Kingdom	Chief Counsellor for Social Issues, European Bank for Reconstruction and Development
	Paula Moreno	Colombia	Founder of peace foundation Manos Visibles
	Rubana Huq	Bangladesh	Textile manufacturer
	Lucy-Anne Holmes	United Kingdom	Founder, No More Page Three campaign
	Brianna Stubbs	United Kingdom	Rower for Great Britain and Oxford PhD Scientist
	Matilda Tristam	United Kingdom	Comics writer
	Nigar Nazar	Pakistan	Cartoonist
	Sharmeen Obaid Chinoy	Pakistan	Documentary film-maker
	Uldus Bakhtiozina	Russia	Photographer
	Lesley Yellowlees	United Kingdom	First female president, Royal Society of Chemistry
	Rebecca Gomperts	Netherlands	Founder, Women on Waves
	Katherine Brown	United Kingdom	Academic, King's College London
	Emily Kasyoka	Kenya	Boxer, Kenya
	Aowen Jin	United Kingdom	Chinese-born British artist
	Eliza Rebeiro	United Kingdom	Founder of Lives not Knives
	Müge İplikçi	Turkey	Journalist
	Natumanya Sarah	Uganda	Educator
	Linda Tirado	United States	Campaigner
	Alice Hagan	United Kingdom	Technician at healthcare company BTG
	May Tha Hla	Myanmar	Food aid social worker
	Rainatou Sow	Guinea	Founder of Make Every Woman Count
	Justa Canaviri	Bolivia	Celebrity chef, Bolivia
	Heather Jackson	United Kingdom	Women's business campaigner
	Ruby Wax	United States	Mental health campaigner and comic
	Umm Ahmed	Iraq	Sole provider for her family
	Xiaolu Guo	People's Republic of China	Novelist and film-maker
	Hind Hobeika	Lebanon	Founder of Instabeat
	Molly Case	United Kingdom	Student nurse and Women of the Future Ambassador
	Joyce Banda	Malawi	Former President of Malawi
	Saadia Zahidi	Pakistan	Managing Director at the World Economic Forum
	Aditi Mittal	India	Stand-up comedian
	Jess Butcher	United Kingdom	Co-founder of Blippar
	Farah Mohamed	United States	Founder, Girls 20 summit
	Katy Tuncer	United Kingdom	Founder, Ready Steady Mums
	Smruti Sriram	United Kingdom	Founder, Wings of Hope & Achievement Awards
	Darshan Karki	Nepal	Opinion-piece editor at Kathmandu Post daily, blogger
	Brooke Magnanti	United States; United Kingdom	Forensic scientist, author, former sex worker
	Chipo Chung	Zimbabwe People's Republic of China	Actor and activist
	Pinar Ogunc	Turkey	Journalist writing about women's issues and the Kurdish political movement
	Sabina Kurgunayeva	Azerbaijan	Footballer who also runs her own bicycle rental business
	Kate Wilson	United Kingdom	Founder of independent children's book publisher, Nosy Crow
	Betty Lalam	Uganda	Director of women's community organisation, Gulu War Affected Training Centre
	Arabella Dorman	United Kingdom	War artist
	Andy Kawa	South Africa	Businesswoman and social entrepreneur
	Bahia Shehab	Lebanon Egypt	Artist, designer and art historian
	Divya Sharma	India	Science student
	Jocelyn Bell Burnell	United Kingdom	Scientist who discovered Pulsars
	Eleni Antoniadou	Greece	Co-founder Transplants Without Donors
	Shelina Zahra Janmohamed	United Kingdom	Blogger, columnist and author
	Salinee Tavaranan	Thailand	Engineer and social entrepreneur
	Hatoon Kadi	Saudi Arabia	Comedian
	Brie Rogers Lowery	United Kingdom	Director of Change.org
	Balvinder Saund	United Kingdom	Chair of Women's Sikh Alliance
	Cora Sherlock	Ireland	Pro-life campaigner and blogger
	Alaa Murabit	Canada Libya	Founder, The Voice of Libyan Women
	Bushra El-Turk	United Kingdom Lebanon	Composer for London Symphony Orchestra
	Kim Winser	United Kingdom	Founder, Winser London
	Arzu Geybullayeva	Azerbaijan	Blogger
	Judith Webb	United Kingdom	First female commander of an all-male British Army squadron
	Sarah Hesterman	Qatar	Equal rights campaigner
	Sana Saleem	Pakistan	Pakistani campaigner against Internet censorship
	Asma Mansour	Tunisia	Co-founder of Tunisian Centre for Social Entrepreneurship
	Diana Nammi	United Kingdom	Kurdish women's rights campaigner against "honour killing"
	Funmi Iyanda	Nigeria	Talk show host, journalist, activist
	Karen Masters	United Kingdom	Scientist at the Institute of Cosmology and Gravitation
	Khuloud Saba	Syria	Researcher and public health worker
	Yolanda Wang Yixuan	People's Republic of China	Women's rights campaigner
	Ayesha Mustafa	United Kingdom	Founder and director of FashionComPassion.co.uk
	Obiageli Ezekwesili	Nigeria	Former World Bank Vice President for Africa and Former Minister for Education
	Tehmina Kazi	United Kingdom	Director of British Muslims for Secular Democracy
	Sophi Tranchell	United Kingdom	Head of Divine Chocolate
	Boghuma Kabisen Titanji	Cameroon	Virologist and campaigner for ethical medical research
	Dwi Rubiyanti Kholifah	Indonesia	Women's movement leader
	Anjali Ramachandran	United Kingdom	Head of Innovation at PHD
	Yas Necati	United Kingdom	Campaigner for better sex education
	Yeonmi Park	South Korea	Activist raising awareness of the plight of her people in North Korea
	Irene Li	Hong Kong	Citizen journalist who took part in and documented protests
	Sandee Pyne	Myanmar	Chief executive of Community Partners International, focused on aid
	Temie Giwa	Nigeria United States	Founder of the One Percent Project, facilitating blood donation
	Kavita Krishnan	India	Secretary, All India Progressive Women's Association
	Sarah Khan	Pakistan	Filmmaker and campaigner
	Nicky Moffat	United Kingdom	Highest Ranked woman in British Armed Forces
	Alice Powell	United Kingdom	Racing driver and first female to win a Formula Renault Championship
	Misty Haith	United Kingdom	Research Engineer at Imperial College London
	Sally Sabry	Egypt	Businesswoman
	Kate Smurthwaite	United Kingdom	Comedian and activist
	Susana Lopez	Mexico	Virologist specialising in rotavirus
	Jaya Luintel	Nepal	Journalist and women's rights advocate
	Nicola Sturgeon	Scotland United Kingdom	First Minister of Scotland

=== 2013 ===
The 2013 event was a month-long BBC series that took place in October. The series examined the role of women in the 21st century and culminated in an event held at BBC Broadcasting House in London, United Kingdom on 25 October 2013 involving a hundred women from around the world, all of whom came from different walks of life. The day featured debate and discussion on radio, television and online, in which the participants were asked to give their opinions about the issues facing women.

The event held on 25 October 2013 featured 100 women from all walks of life.

Image	Name	Occupation
	Salwa Abu Libdeh	Palestinian television journalist
	Madawi Al-Rasheed	Saudi academic and gender expert
	Nadia Al-Sakkaf	Editor, Yemen Times
	Sreymom Ang	Cambodian fashion designer
	Anna Arrowsmith	English porn film director
	Joyce Aoko Aruga	Student teacher in Kenya
	Moe Thuzar Aung	Myanmar state broadcast
	Rehana Azib	London-based barrister
	Firuza Aliyeva	Associate Director, Azerbaijan Diplomatic Academy
	Zainab Hawa Bangura	UN special representative on sexual violence in conflict
	Michaela Bergman	Chief Counsellor for Social Issues, European Bank for Reconstruction and Development
	Claire Bertschinger	Anglo-Swiss nurse whose work inspired Live Aid
	Ingrid Betancourt	French-Colombian former politician and FARC hostage
	Cherie Blair	British barrister and philanthropist
	Emma Bonino	Minister of Foreign Affairs, Italy
	Yvonne Brewster	Stage director, teacher and writer
	Gurinder Chadha	British-Asian film director
	Nervana Mahmoud	Egyptian blogger and commentator
	Irina Chakraborty	Russian-Finnish-Indian engineer
	Shadi Sadr	Iranian lawyer and human rights defender
	Chipo Chung	Chinese-Zimbabwean actor and activist
	Helen Clark	Head of UN Development Programme, former New Zealand Prime Minister
	Diane Coyle	Economist, writer and blogger
	Caroline Criado Perez	British journalist and feminist campaigner
	Jody Day	Founder of Gateway Women, a network for childless women
	Es Devlin	British theatre designer
	Klára Dobrev	Hungarian lawyer and economist
	Efua Dorkenoo	Ghanaian Senior Advisor to Equality Now and campaigner against female genital mutilation
	Sigridur Maria Egilsdottir	Iceland's champion debater
	Marwa El-Daly	Egyptian grassroots activists, founder of the Waqfeyat Foundation
	Bushra El-Turk	British-Lebanese composer
	Obiageli Ezekwesili	Senior adviser, Open Society Foundations
	Caroline Farrow	Catholic writer, blogger and pro-life activist
	Anne Stella Fomumbod	Women's rights activist, Cameroon
	Teresa Forcades	Radical Spanish nun
	Razan Ghazzawi	Syrian blogger and activist
	Rebecca Gomperts	Dutch doctor, head of Women on Waves
	Tanni Grey-Thompson	Winner of 11 Paralympic Games gold medals
	Parveen Hassan	Conservative women's organiser, UK
	Barbara Hewson	Senior barrister, UK
	Anis Hidayah	Indonesian activist working on migrant worker rights
	Deborah Hopkins	British mother and political activist
	Rose Hudson-Wilkin	Jamaican born British priest
	Bettany Hughes	Historian, author, broadcaster
	Rubana Huq	Bangladeshi textile manufacturer
	Leyla Hussein	Co-founder, Daughters of Eve, anti-violence campaigner
	Heather Jackson (CEO)	CEO of An Inspirational Journey and founder of The Women's Business Forum
	Shelina Zahra Janmohamed	Blogger, columnist and author
	Laura Janner-Klausner	Movement rabbi, specializing in Reform Judaism
	Aowen Jin	Chinese contemporary artist
	Andy Kawa	South African businesswoman, anti-violence campaigner
	Tehmina Kazi	Director, British Muslims for a Secular Democracy
	Jude Kelly	Artistic Director, Southbank Centre
	Fereshteh Khosroujerdy	Visually impaired Iranian singer
	Azadeh Kian	Iranian academic and gender specialist
	Kanya King	CEO and founder, Mobo
	Fawzia Koofi	MP and former Deputy Speaker, Afghan National Parliament
	Dina Korzun	Russian actor and charity activist
	Martha Lane-Fox	UK technology entrepreneur
	Paris Lees	Transgender broadcaster
	Ann Leslie	Journalist
	Sian Lindley	Researcher in social technology
	Pontso Mafethe	Programme manager, Comic Relief
	Brooke Magnanti	Forensic scientist, author, former sex worker
	Mmasekgoa Masire-Mwamba	Deputy Secretary General, the Commonwealth
	Shirley Meredeen	Founding member, Growing Old Disgracefully
	Samar Samir Mezghanni	Record-breaking young Tunisian writer
	Shazia Mirza	British comedian
	Aditi Mittal	Indian comedian
	Rosmery Mollo	Indigenous Bolivian activist
	Orzala Ashraf Nemat	Afghan scholar and civil society activist
	Pauline Neville-Jones	Former UK Security and Counter-Terrorism Minister
	Susie Orbach	Psychotherapist and author
	Mirina Paananen	Islamic researcher
	Claudia Paz y Paz	Attorney General, Guatemala
	Mariane Pearl	French journalist, founder of Chime for Change
	Laura Perrins	Stay-at-home mother
	Charlotte Raven	British feminist and journalist
	Gail Rebuck	Chief executive, Random House UK
	Justine Roberts	Founder, Mumsnet
	Sarah Rogers	Voice of Women community radio, Sierra Leone
	Fatima Said	British-Egyptian pro-democracy advocate
	Balvinder Saund	Chair of Sikh Women's Alliance
	Kamila Shamsie	UK-based Pakistani writer
	Divya Sharma	Indian electronics and communications engineer
	Bahia Shehab	Lebanese-Egyptian artist, designer and art historian
	Joanna Shields	Chair and CEO, Tech City Investment Organisation
	Stephanie Shirley	Businesswoman and philanthropist
	Clare Short	British politician, former International Development Secretary
	Jacqui Smith	Former UK Home Secretary
	Kate Smurthwaite	British stand-up comedian and activist
	Rainatou Sow	Guinean founder, Make Every Woman Count
	Louise Stephenson	Trainee counsellor, UK
	May Tha Hla	Founder, Helping The Burmese Delta
	Natasha Walter	British feminist writer and campaigner
	Judith Webb	First female commander of all-male British Army squadron
	Saadia Zahidi	Head of Gender Parity and Human Capital, World Economic Forum
	Dinara Zhorobekova	Student, Kyrgyzstan
	Gemma Godfrey	Board director, broadcaster
	Martina Navratilova	18-time Grand Slam singles tennis champion

== Other participants ==
Name	Occupation
Sarah Walker	Head of the English Collective of Prostitutes
Cerrie Burnell	Children's television presenter
Selma James	Writer and activist

== See also ==
- List of awards honoring women
