= Tamara Cheremnova =

- Тамара Черемнова
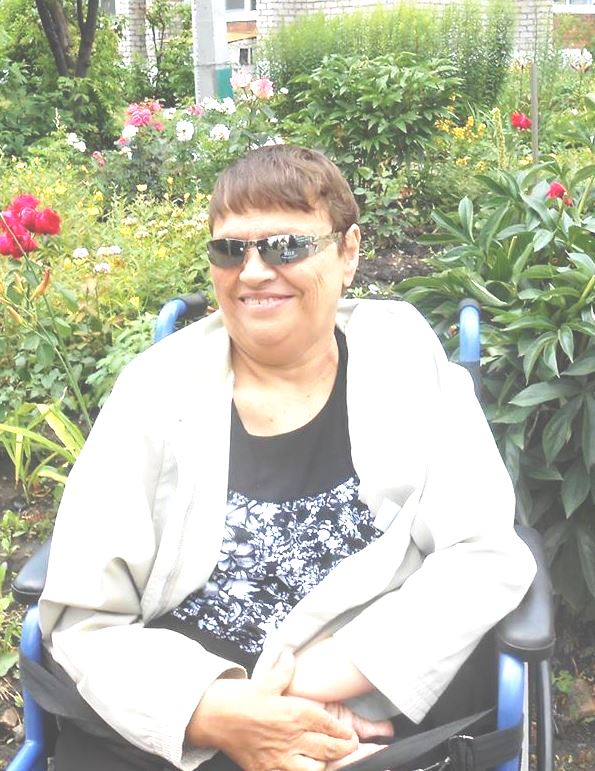
- Born: 6 December 1955 (age 70); Russian SFSR, Soviet Union
- Occupation: Children's author

Tamara Cheremnova (Russian: Тамара Черемнова; born December 6, 1955) is a Russian author called the "Storyteller of Siberia". She has cerebral palsy and she spent her adult life in a mental asylum before her writings revealed her misdiagnosis. She was one of the BBC's "100 Women" in 2018.

== Life ==
Cheremnova was born in Russia in 1955.

In 1961, when she was six years old, her parents took her to an orphanage, where they diagnosed " intellectual disability." She can remember being upset when her parents visited her as they would not take her home. Cheremnova has some sympathy as disabled children were then considered second class. She remembers that her parents rarely picked her up and it was up to her to learn to sit up. She remembers that there was a fatal fire at her home and one carer just left her behind. She would have died if another patient had not pushed her out of the building. Despite this a former teacher, Anna Sutyagina, taught her to read and write. She says that she learnt to count from reading page numbers in books. In 1973, when she turned 18, she was sent to a mental asylum in Novokuznetsk because of her diagnosis. There she began to write despite the physical difficulties.

In 1990 she wrote her first book for children, From the life of the wise man Mixuta, which was published by the Editorial of the province of Kémerovo. With the royalties she bought a typewriter and in 2003 she wrote On the red hair Tajiuxka. This book, however, was not published because the publisher considered it too complicated for children. However, her other writings were read on the internet by Olga Zaykina in Moscow. She published her book online. She is known as the storyteller in Siberia and she is now living as the center of attention. She has hired two nurses who dress her and feed her. In December 2018 she was included as one of the BBC 100 Women.

== Works ==
- Из жизни волшебника Мишуты (From the life of the wise man Mixuta, 1990)
- Про рыжую Таюшку (About the red hair Tajiuxka, 2003)
- Приключения лесной ведьмочки Шиши (Adventure in the woods with Xixi, 2015) ISBN 9785519026147
- Шел по осени щенок (Walking with the Autumn Puppy, 2018) ISBN 978-5519548243
- Трава, пробившая асфальт (Grass, Asphalt Samples, 2018) ISBN 978-5519593274
