= Shila Ensandost =

Afghan teacher and activist

- Born: Afghanistan
- Education: Religious studies
- Occupations: Teacher; Activist
- Known for: Activism for women's right to education; October 2021 demonstration dressed in white with her husband and daughter simulating a post-death ritual to demand justice and freedom for women
- Children: 1 daughter
- Awards: BBC 100 Women

Shila Ensandost is an Afghan teacher and activist for women's right to education.

== Activism ==
Shila is a graduate of religious studies and a teacher in several schools. She has participated in various demonstrations and women's associations. In October 2021, together with her husband and daughter, she dressed in white in a demonstration simulating the post-death ritual to demand justice and freedom for women.

== Recognition ==
- BBC 100 Women
