= Velmariri Bambari =

Indonesian women's rights activist

- Born: 1980; Indonesia
- Occupation: women's rights activist
- Awards: 100 Women (BBC) (2022)

Velmariri Bambari (born 1980) is an Indonesian activist who works for the rights of victims of sexual violence. She has a physical disability and walks with the help of crutches. Bambari was honored as one of the BBC 100 Women in 2022.

== Biography ==
In 2014, Bambari decided take a three-year training course in child protection and female empowerment. Since 2018, she has raised her voice to denounce the situation of victims of sexual violence in remote areas of Indonesia and accompanied victims of sexual violence to the police stations to provide psychological support to them, so that the complaints are processed properly. In Central Sulawesi province of Indonesia, both the perpetrators and women who have suffered sexual abuse are fined according to customary laws. Also there is no imprisonment for the offender. Bambari fought to ignore these rules and to put the attackers in jail. Many Indonesian women who have experienced sexual assault have turned to Bambari and she has already assisted at least 10 of them in getting justice as well as self-empowerment and preparation for financial independence. When a sexual violence is reported, Bambari is frequently the first person the police contact because of her campaign.

== Recognition ==
In December 2022, by recognising her contributions, BBC named Bambari as one among the BBC's 100 Women.
