= Sana Saleem =

Pakistani journalist and human rights activist

Sana Saleem is a Pakistani journalist and human rights activist who co-founded the not-for-profit free-speech group Bolo Bhi. Saleem was selected as one of the BBC's 100 Women in 2014.
