= Lorna Prendergast =

Australian dementia researcher and activist

Lorna Prendergast is an Australian dementia researcher and activist. She graduated from the University of Melbourne with a master's degree in ageing in 2019, at the age of 90. After graduating, she began trials on music therapy as a treatment for dementia. She was named to the BBC's 100 Women in 2020 and was a nominee for Australian of the Year in 2021.
