= Samah Subay =

Yemeni lawyer

- Citizenship: Yemen
- Occupation: Lawyer

Samah Subay (Arabic: سماح سبيع) is a Yemeni lawyer, working to provide legal support for families who had children 'disappear'. These disappeared are a result of the Yemeni Civil War (2015–present), where many people have been detained, tortured, and held in unknown locations. As a result, families do not know where or when their members are being held or if they are ok.

As a result of her work, Subay has been included in the BBC's list of 100 inspiring and influential women from around the world for 2019.
