= Fereshteh Khosroujerdy =

Visually impaired Iranian singer

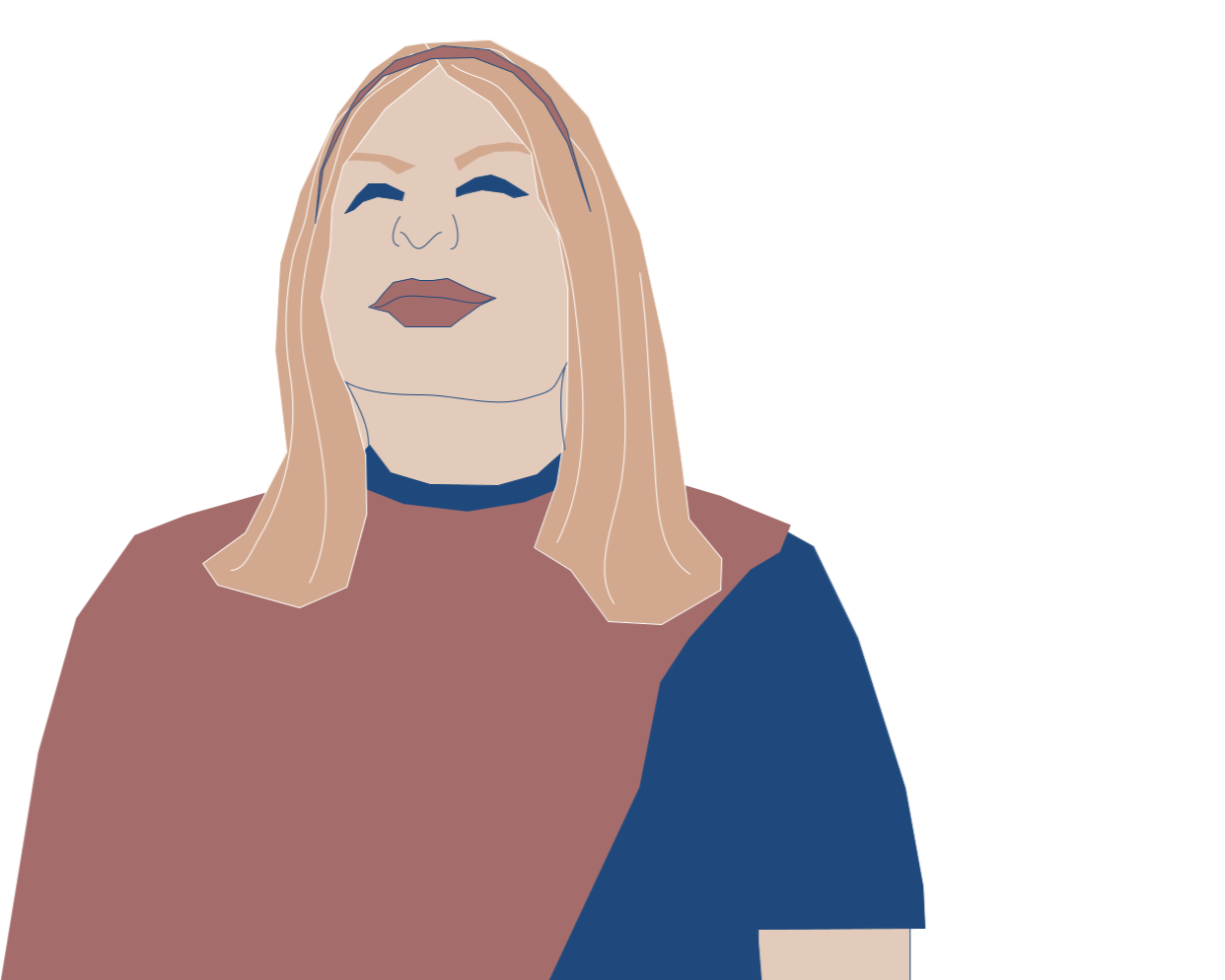

Fereshteh Khosroujerdy (Persian: فرشته خسروجردی) is a visually impaired Iranian singer. Born visually impaired, she fled Iran and lived in the UK in 2007 after experiencing domestic abuse at the hands of her husband.

She was named one of BBC's 100 Women in 2013.
