= Anne Grall =

French comedian

- Occupation: Comedian
- Known for: Comedian and Founder of The Greenwashing Comedy Club

Anne Grall is a French comedian from Paris and one of BBC 100 Women in 2023. She is the founder of the Greenwashing Comedy Club, a stand-up collective that addresses environmental issues as well as feminism, poverty, disability and LGBTQ+ rights.

Grall believes that humor can be used to constructively discuss climate change.

== See also ==
- 100 Women (BBC)
