= Ann Rose Nu Tawng =

Burmese nun

- Born: 1975 (age 50–51); Myanmar
- Occupation: nun
- Known for: offering her life for others

Ann Rose Nu Tawng (born 1975) is a Catholic Xaverian nun in Myanmar who offered her life to try and save others in 2021. She attracted attention from the Pope and the BBC who made her one of their 100 Women.

== Life ==
Nu Tawng was one of the Sisters of St. Francis Xavier.

She came to notice when police were chasing young protesters in Myitkyina. The protesters had shields they had constructed and hard hats while the police were heavily armed. The protests followed the overthrow of Aung San Suu Kyi on 1 February 2021 by the military. Nu Tawng got down on her knees to plead with the police to not be violent to the young people who were sheltering in her clinic. She pointed out that they were protesting peacefully but the police said they needed to do their duty. Nu Tawng suggested that if they needed to kill somebody then she would offer her life.

The discussion with the police was caught on camera by an observer and posted on line. The video was reported by the BBC and the Guardian. The Pope later commented on her sacrifice.

In December 2021 the BBC recognised her as one of their BBC 100 Women.
