= Huang Wensi =

Chinese boxer and teacher (born 1989)

- Born: May 22, 1989 (age 37); Guangdong, China
- Citizenship: China
- Occupations: Boxer and Teacher
- Spouse: Deng Peipeng

Huang Wensi (born May 22, 1989) is a Chinese boxer and teacher, known for fighting traditional women stereotypes and challenging depression, as well as being included in the BBC's list of 100 inspiring and influential women from around the world for 2019.

== Life ==
On May 22, 1989 she was born in Guangdong, China. She began boxing in 2002 after being spotted by a coach at school, joining a provincial team three years later but retiring in 2011 due to an injury. In 2015 she met her husband, Deng Peipeng, and had a son a year later. Faced with near suicidal postpartum depression, she began an intense training regime to get professionally back into the sport. After returning to her career she won the Asia Female Continental Super Flyweight Championship gold belt.

In her boxing career she has sought to challenge traditional women stereotypes, "not just limited to being a wife or mother in the house". When she is not boxing, she works as a teacher in Zhejiang, China.
