= Sonia Kastner =

American wildfire detection tech developer

- Education: Physics Harvard University (BA), Stanford University (MBA)
- Occupations: CEO and co-founder of Pano AI

Sonia Kastner is the CEO and co-founder of Pano AI, a wildfire detection tech company. She was featured in the BBC 100 Women 2023 for her leadership of a company which is creating new ways of aiding fire professionals combat wildfires.

== Biography ==
Kastner graduated with a BA in physics from Harvard University, and went on to complete an MBA at Stanford Graduate School of Business. Kastner moved to California in 2007, where she worked in the solar industry and later helped build a number of companies, including spending time at Nest, developing the early AI-powered Nest Cam. Before entering the technology sector, Kastner worked in economic development for New York City. She then spent more than ten years building supply chain and manufacturing organisations.

== Leadership of Pano AI ==
Kastner co-founded Pano AI in 2019, in response to firefighting resources struggling to keep up with the increasing threat of wildfires. Pano AI uses a network of cameras, satellite imagery and AI algorithms to detect wildfires early-on. The aim of Pano AI under Kastner's leadership is to make huge resource savings by quickening response times and detection of wildfires.

Pano AI watches over 24 million acres of land across the US, Canada, and Australia for both public and private clientele. In 2024, the company alerted these customers to more than 100 fires.
