= Paola Villarreal =

Mexican computer programmer

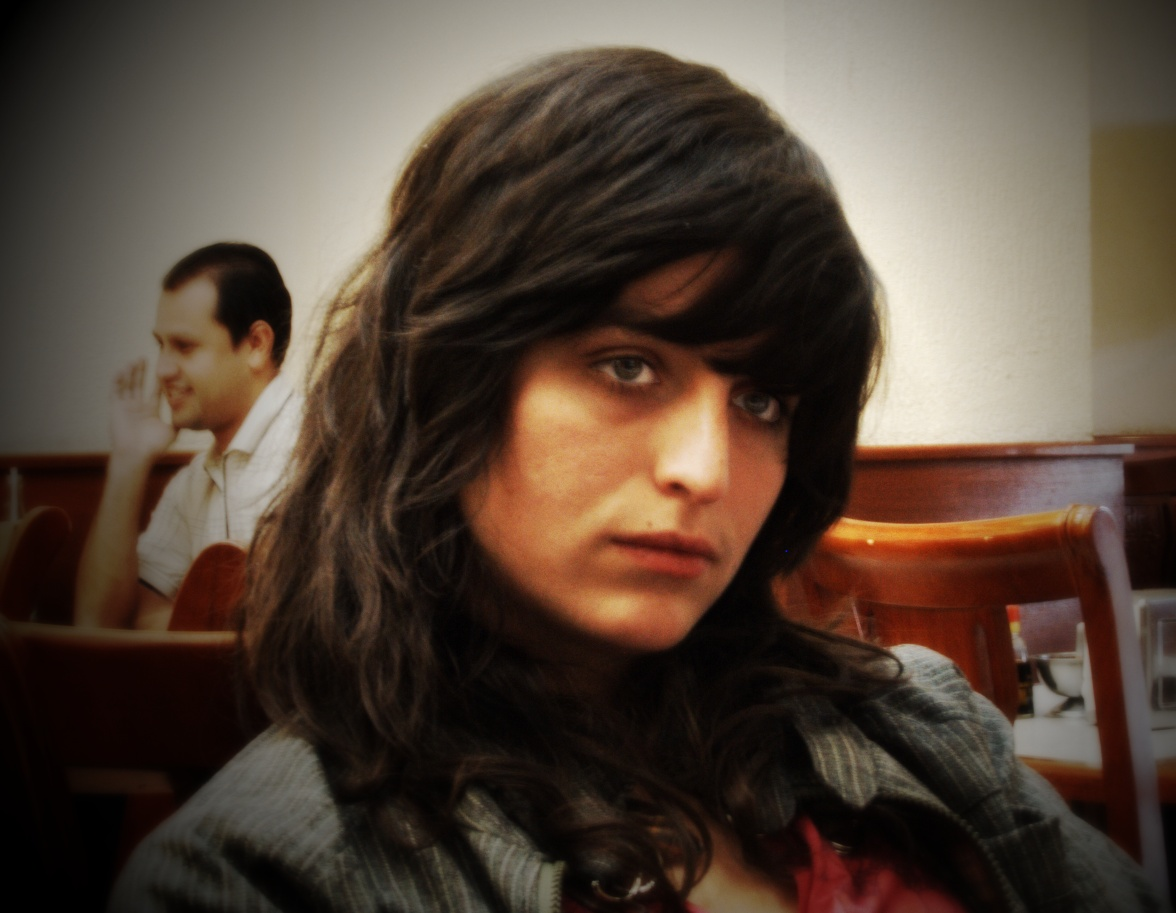

Paola Villarreal (born 5 October 1984) is a Mexican computer programmer who developed the Data for Justice app equipped with an interactive map that compares police operations in white dominated areas and minority neighborhoods in Mexico. Data from the app helped reversed 20,000 racially unbalanced drug convictions.

== Honors ==
She was named in the BBC 100 Women (inspiring and influential women from around the world) in 2019 for her work in maternal health.

She was listed in the MIT Innovators Under 35 LATAM for 2018.
