= Hoda Khamosh =

Afghan journalist

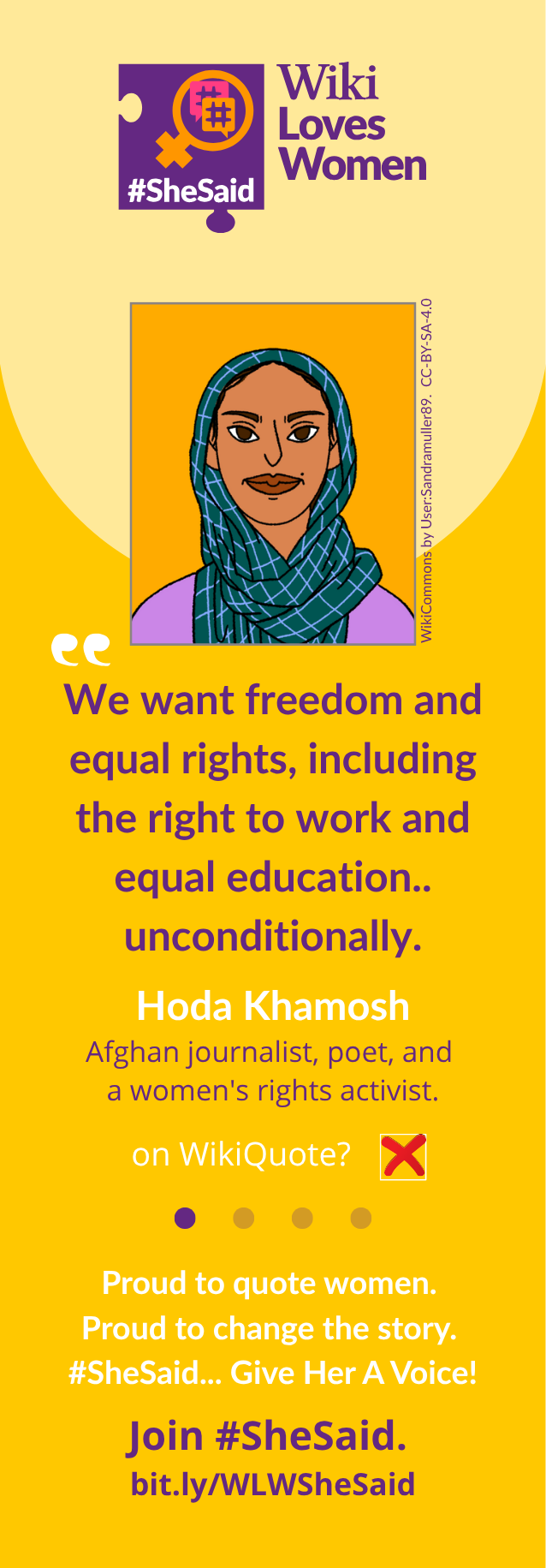
- Depiction of Hoda Khamosh, Afghan Journalist
- Born: 1996; Iran
- Education: Kabul University
- Occupation(s): Journalist, poet

Hoda Khamosh, born in 1996, is an Afghan journalist, poet, and a women's rights activist.

== Biography ==
Hoda was born in Iran where her parents had taken refuge following the first arrival of the Taliban in power. While still a child, her family returned to province of Pawan, north of Kabul Afghanistan. She would go on to be a journalist.

She worked as a presenter in 2015 for several local radio channels. Since the return to power of the Taliban in August 2021, she remains Afghanistan organizing workshops for girls and women who are no longer accepted in schools. At the end of 2021, she appeared on the BBC's list of the world's 100 women of the year (100 Women).
