= Judi Aubel =

American social entrepreneur

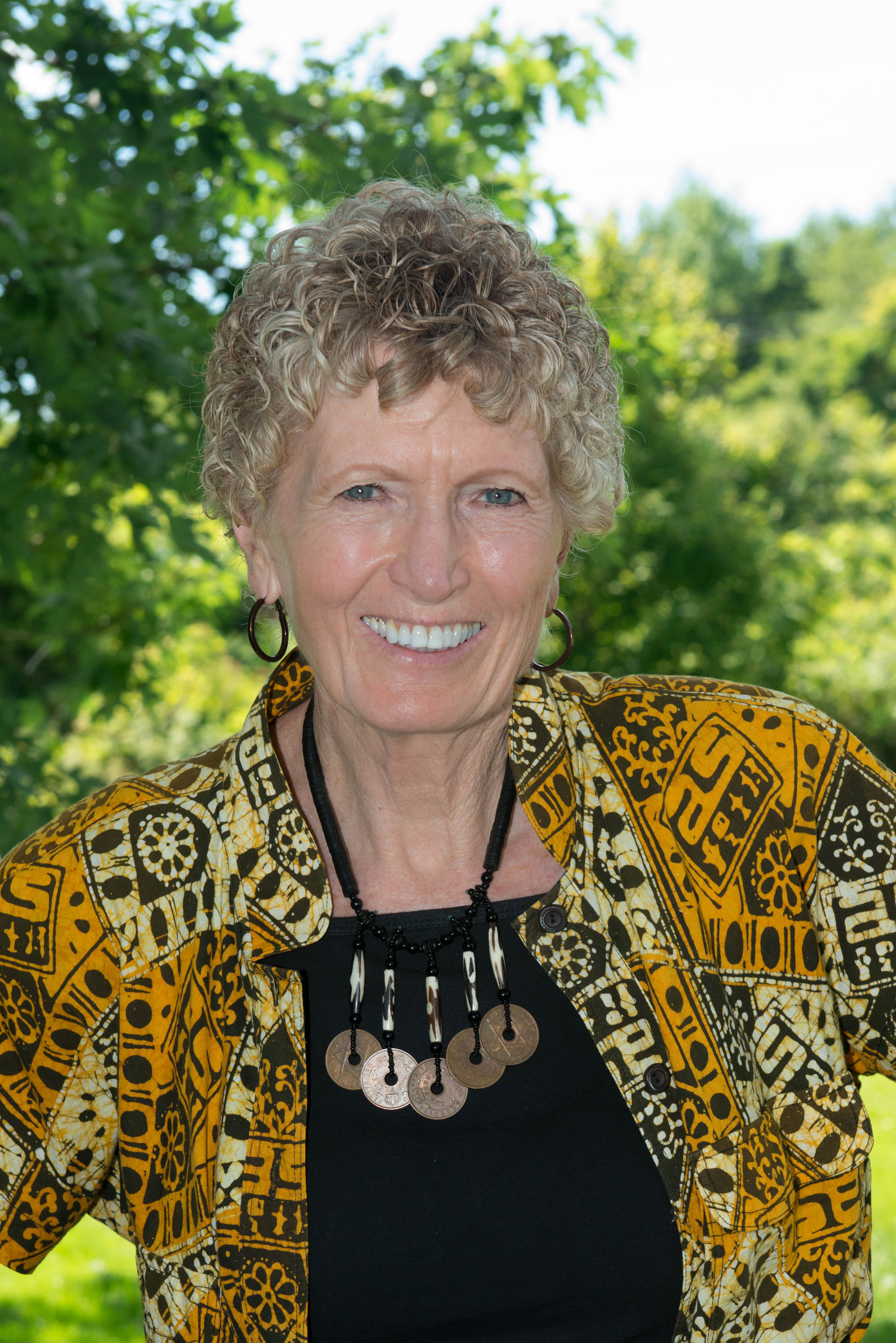
Judi Aubel in 2017

Judith "Judi" Aubel (born 1947) is an American community health and development specialist. She is the co-founder and executive director of the American and Senegalese non-profit organization Grandmother Project – Change through Culture. Her organization works to improve the lives of women, children and families in the Global South by building on cultural context and involving multi-generational actors, including grandmothers.

== Career ==
Aubel was a Peace Corps volunteer in the Ivory Coast; and had worked in international development for 20 years.

The Grandmother Project was founded in 2004, with Aubel as was one of the founders; and she works alongside Senegalese professionals. The goal in creating The Grandmother Project is to focus on grandmother inclusion and to acknowledge their role, increase their knowledge, and strengthen their role as advocates of change within the community. The program has developed their own approach through the "Change through Culture" practice with two key pillars; to build on cultural roles and values, and to recognize the wisdom and authority of older people. By leveraging the influential role of grandmothers in families and communities they are able to make major social changes and improve health. Grandmothers in the group will often provide help and advice to new mothers regarding neonatal health, feeding, and pregnancy.

Her review of the literature relating to the role grandmothers play in mother and child nutrition and health was published in 2012 in the journal, Maternal and Child Nutrition.

== Awards ==
She received the Hero award from Trust Women, a joint venture of the Thomas Reuters Foundation and the International Herald Tribune. Aubel was a 2012 Ashoka Fellow. In 2016, she was a 2016 BBC 100 Women laureate.

== Selected publications ==
- "Lessons on sustainability for community health projects", World Health Forum, 1996, 17(1), pp. 52–57. (With Kinday Samba-Ndure)
- "The role and influence of grandmothers on child nutrition: culturally designated advisors and caregivers", Maternal and Child Nutrition, 28 September 2011.
