= Xu Zaozao =

Chinese egg freezing campaigner

- Born: 1988 (age 37–38); China
- Awards: 100 Women (BBC) (2023)

Xu Zaozao is a Chinese woman campaigning to be allowed to have her own eggs frozen. She is a prominent advocate for single women reproductive rights and bodily autonomy. After hospital in Beijing declined to freeze Xu Zaozao's eggs, she filed a lawsuit in 2019, but her case was dismissed by a Beijing court in July 2022. Her case has been widely followed in China, where women's rights are becoming a more important topic and the declining birthrate is causing concern. In November 2023, she was named on the BBC 100 Women list.

== Advocacy ==
In 2018, when she was 30 years old, Xu went to a public hospital in Beijing to ask about freezing her eggs, so she could have the option to bear children later. But after an initial check-up, she was told she could not proceed without a marriage certificate. According to the judgment she received in 2022, the hospital argued that egg freezing poses certain health risks, and thus egg-freezing services were only available to women who could not get pregnant without the assistance of egg-freezing, and not for healthy patients. In 2019, Xu filed a lawsuit against the Beijing hospital, claiming that it had infringed upon her personal rights. Xu alleged that the hospital had discriminated against women, violated her personal rights, and broken pertinent laws pertaining to gender equality and the outlawing of all forms of discrimination against women by declining to freeze the eggs of single women. The case went to trial in December 2019; however, due to the complex interplay of medical, legal, and ethical considerations with regard to egg freezing, the judge was unable to reach a decision. The court rejected Xu's arguments in July 2022 following a rehearing of the case in a private session in September 2021; however, Xu chose to launch an appeal. In 2023, she was included in the BBC 100 Women list.
