= Lizt Alfonso =

Cuban dancer

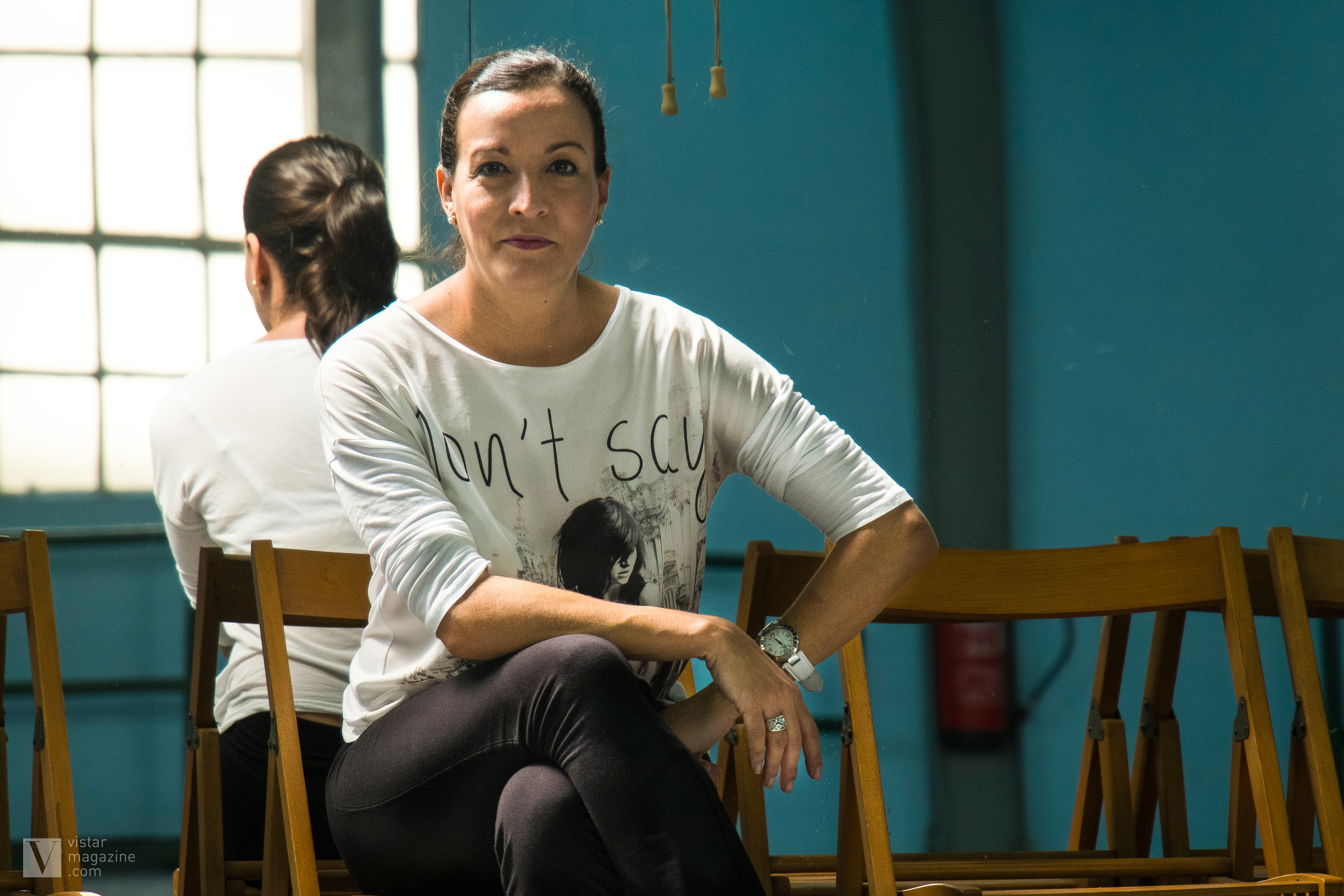
- Born: 25 August 1967 (age 57); Havana, Cuba
- Education: her dance company
- Occupation: leads dance company
- Website: Her dance troupe

Lizt Alfonso (born 25 August 1967) is a Cuban national who leads her own Cuban dance company that has performed at the White House and in hundreds of cities. In 2018 she was named as one of the BBC 100 Women.

== Life ==
Alfonso was born in Havana in 1967. In 1991 she formed a dance troupe in Cuba. Initially there were no male dancers in her troupe. She came to international notice when her dance company was chosen to entertain at the White House during Barack Obama's administration. She has enjoyed support within Cuba and her dance school has 1000 pupils. The school is open to anyone and it covers a range of different ages.

Her dance troupe has performed in hundreds of cities in over twenty countries to 2.5 million people. Her choreography includes different dance styles from ballet to Spanish traditions of flamenco, salsa, cha-cha, rumba and the bolero.

In 2018 she was recognised with an award to join the BBC 100 Women.
