= Shairbu Sagynbaeva =

- Born: c.1954
- Other names: Shayyr Ama and Chaiyrbu Sagynbaeva
- Occupations: pharmaceutical industry and now social entrepreneur
- Known for: advocate for cancer patients

Shairbu Sagynbaeva (Kyrgyz: Шайырбү Сагынбаева; born c.1954) or Chaiyrbu Sagynbaeva, aka Shayyr Ama, is a Kyrgyzstani social entrepreneur. She is an advocate for women living with cancer in her country. She created a workshop and became a de facto support worker for her fellow cancer sufferers. She was identified as one of the BBC's 100 Women of influence in 2023 and continues to advocate for better treatment.

== Life ==
Sagynbaeva was born in about 1954. For 20 years she worked in the pharmaceutical industry. One of her sons was hit by an iron bar while being robbed of his mobile phone. He ended up in the hospital in 2006. Her husband was affected and died six months after the incident; the son who had been hit died in 2016.

Sagynbaeva was diagnosed with uterine cancer, and she made preparations by preparing letters for those she loved to be opened after she had died. Her doctor told her to destroy the letters and to prepare to live. She took some of the advice and tore up most of the letters. For three years, she received treatment, and the cancer began to go into remission. During the process, she finally destroyed the last two letters as she began to recover. She had serious difficulties in being able to pay for her medications and realised the importance of having a supportive environment and doctors, something she did not find in Kyrgyzstan. At first, she decided to support cancer patients alone. She was asked to speak to a young woman who had abandoned her fiancé after she had a breast amputated. Sagynbaeva intervened with the girl, her fiancé and his family and the marriage went ahead. Sagynbaeva used her sewing skills to make her a prosthetic breast. She had become a volunteer supporter that mirrored the support mechanisms that a cancer patient might find in richer countries.

Together with four other patients, she started a workshop to help cancer patients cope with expensive treatments. She created "For Life" to manufacture and sell handbags and accessories. The profits were to help cancer patients. By 2023, they had raised $33,000 for 34 women and by 2025 it was 37 women. Obtaining medicine was a problem in her country. She noted that a mother of three had died because her medicine was delivered too late. She argues that "medicine is cheaper than children in orphanages". She also promoted a hostel for people undergoing treatment who live far from the health centre.

Sagynbaeva is an advocate for women living with cancer in her country. In 2022, a film was made of her work and a concert organised to raise money. She was identified as one of the BBC's 100 Women of influence in 2023. By 2025 she was reporting that the state was now delivering some essential drugs, but described the quantity as meagre. One patient complained that they had only received drugs three times over the course of seven years. A standard method of obtaining drugs is to order them directly from other countries and have patients sell off items to fund their treatment.

In 2025 she was at the National Center for Oncology and Hematology in Bishkek, talking to patients about the shortage of drugs.
