= Dima Nashawi =

- Born: 1980 (age 45–46); Damascus, Syria
- Citizenship: Syria
- Occupations: Artist, Activist, Clown

Dima Nashawi (Arabic: ديمة نشاوي; born 1980) is an artist and activist for the rights of the Syrian children residing in Beirut. She has been an illustrator and clown, and has founded the Syrian Culture Memory Initiative (MISC) project.

== Biography ==
Nashawi studied sociology at Damascus University, then she went to study Master's in Art at King's College London. In 2001, she began making graphic and comic designs. In 2010 and 2011, she made her first exhibition of support for refugees under the umbrella of UNHCR, to support children with cancer under the auspices of the Syrian NGO Basma. Her art focuses on Syrian collective memory, personal experiences, advocating for prisoner of conscience, and the forced disappeared. She wants to transmit the memory of Syria's conflict, and mold the future identity of the country.

In February 2014, she joined Clown Me In (CMI), with whom she acted as a clown on the street under the name Nseet ("I forgot" in Arabic). Her character performs sarcastically on her short-term memory to spread joy and laughter. This lasted until September 2015, when she traveled to London for a master's degree in arts and cultural management at King's College University. In February 2017, she returned to Beirut and returned to CMI, and is additionally part of the Asfari Institute for Civil Society and Citizenship.

She was included in BBC's list of 100 inspiring and influential women from around the world for 2018.
