= Nigar Marf =

Iraqi nurse

Nigar Marf is an Iraqi nurse and the chief nurse at the Burn and Reconstructive Surgery Hospital in Sulaymaniyah, a province in the Kurdish region. Her work focusses mainly on pediatrics burns and intensive care in her 25 years of service at the hospital. She treats and counsels women burn victims resulting from self-immolation – an act of setting oneself on fire. It is a common act among girls as young as 16 years old who had suffered physical and mental abuse at home before setting themselves on fire in protest. In December 2022, she was honoured in the BBC's 100 Women.
