= Nana Akua Oppong Birmeh =

Ghanaian architect

- Born: 1981 (age 43–44)
- Occupation: Architect
- Awards: Forty under 40 Awards (Architecture/Design/Décor category, 2017); BBC 100 Women (2017)
- Practice: Arch Xenus (founder, 2011)

Nana Akua Oppong Birmeh (born 1981 or 1982) is a Ghanaian architect who is the CEO of ArchXenus.

== Biography ==
She founded the architecture firm Arch Xenus in 2011.

In November 2021, she was appointed as a member of the governing board of the newly-created Land Use and Spatial Planning Authority (LUSPA), representing the Ghana Institute of Architects.

== Awards ==
- 2017: Forty under 40 Awards organized by Xodus Communications Limited (event agency) under architecture/design/décor
- 2017: BBC's 100 Women
