= Cristina Randall =

Canadian-born Mexican entrepreneur

- Born: 1985 or 1986 (age 39–40); Canada
- Occupation: Entrepreneur

Cristina Randall (born 1985 or 1986) is a Canadian-born Mexican entrepreneur profiled in the BBC's 2015 100 Women list as one of 30 entrepreneurs under 30. She co-founded an online payment system called Conekta.
