= Saeeda Etebari =

Afghan jewelry artist

- Born: Pakistan

Saeeda Etebari (born 1988/1989) is an Afghan jewelry artist. Etebari had meningitis when she was one, causing her to be deaf. She joined the Turquoise Mountain Institute for Afghan Arts and Architecture and trained in jewelry-making. She was chosen to have an exhibition at the Smithsonian in Washington D.C. She was recognized on the BBC's "100 Women 2021" list.

== Early life and education ==
Etebari was born in a Pakistani refugee camp to Afghan parents. She was the third of nine children. When she was only one years old, she developed meningitis, which, for Etebari, resulted in hearing loss and not being able to speak. Etebari couldn't go to school, so her father founded a deaf school for her to learn.

After graduating, Etebari's brother suggested she apply to Turquoise Mountain Institute. At Turquoise Mountain, she studied handmade jewelry design.

== Smithsonian exhibition ==
In 2016, Etebari was chosen alongside Abdul Matin Malekzadah and Sughra Hussainy, to have an exhibition at the Smithsonian Museum. Etebari's work is inspired by the culture of where she grew up in Afghanistan. One of Etebari's more famous pieces is an emerald and gold necklace that she designed with British jeweler Pippa Small, which was displayed at the Smithsonian. Etebari's work is inspired by the culture of where she grew up in Afghanistan.
