= Sara Wahedi =

Afghan-Canadian entrepreneur (born 1995)

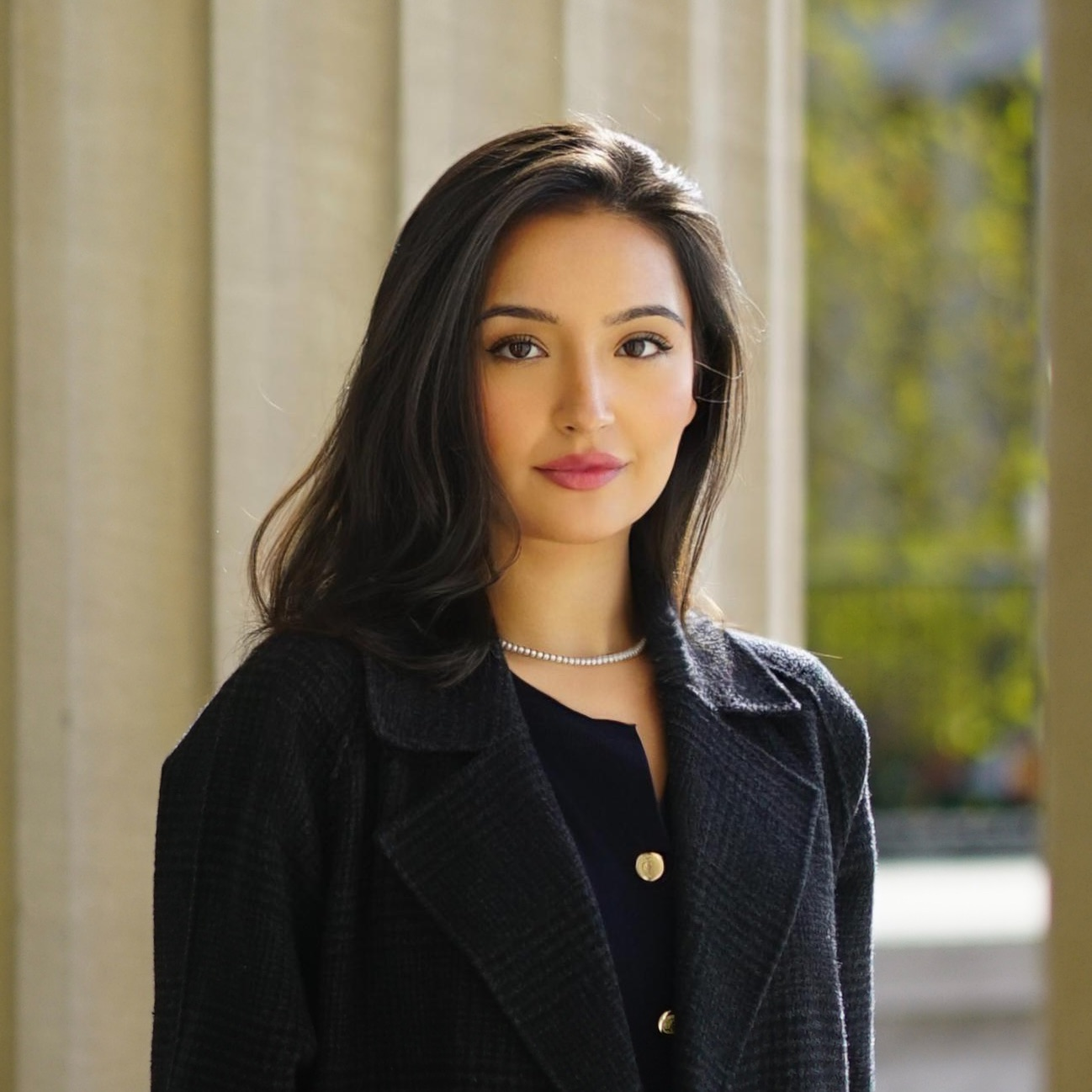
- Born: Sara Wahedi; 23 January 1995 (age 31)
- Education: Columbia University University of Oxford
- Occupations: Entrepreneur, Businesswoman

Sara Wahedi (Note: Persian: سارا واحدی, Dari pronunciation: [sɑːɾɑː wɑːɦɪd̪íː].) (Dari: سارا واحدی, pronounced [sɑːɾɑː wɑːɦɪd̪íː]; born 23 January 1995) is an Afghan-Canadian tech entrepreneur and humanitarian. She is the Chief Executive Officer of Civaam and is the founder and Chief Executive Officer of Ehtesab, a civic technology startup in Kabul, Afghanistan.

== Biography ==
Wahedi was born in Kabul. She and her family emigrated from Kabul and settled in Canada in 2005. In 2018, Wahedi founded Ehtesab with $2,500 of her own savings, later attracting an investment from a New York-based tech design entrepreneur, and Netlinks, one of Afghanistan's largest IT companies, which contributed an additional $40,000. Ehtesab enables its users to report on local incidents, establishing it as Afghanistan's first citizen engagement platform. It provides real-time security alerts and updates in three languages. The app is designed to combat misinformation by providing real-time updates on Kabul's security, energy, and traffic situations. During the turbulent period as the Taliban regained control of Afghanistan in 2021, the app proved especially valuable to residents during the bombings, roadblocks, and attacks. At that time, the company employed 20 people and was developing covert platforms to enable women to discreetly access healthcare, education, and employment services, thereby bypassing Taliban surveillance and restrictions.

In 2024, Wahedi earned a bachelor's degree in urban studies with a concentration in architecture from Columbia University. She also serves on the board of Rukhshana Media, a news organization focused on women’s issues in Afghanistan. Additionally, she completed an internship with Apple, working with teams specializing in artificial intelligence and machine learning.

== Accolades ==
- Wahedi was recognized as one of TIME Magazine's Next Generation Leaders in 2021.
- Wahedi has been named a Clarendon Scholar to attend Oxford University in 2024.
- She was listed among MIT Technology Review's Innovators Under 35 in 2022.
- In 2023, she was awarded as Entrepreneur of the Year by One Young World.
- Wahedi was included in the Top 100 inspiring and influential women by the BBC in 2021.
- In 2023, she was inducted into the GS Honor Society.
