= Rimppi Kumari =

Indian farmer

Rimppi Kumari (born 1982 or 1983 (age 42–43)) is an Indian woman farmer who, along with her sister Karamjit, took over a 32-acre farm in Rajasthan after their father died. She is one of the seven Indians who made it on to the BBC list of 100 most aspirational women in 2015. She began to adapt modern farming technologies for cultivation.
