= Hollie Daniels =

American sex trafficking survivor (born 1982)

Hollie Daniels (born 1982) is an American activist, sex trafficking survivor and an advocate for victims of human trafficking in Columbus, Ohio. She educates on substance abuse disorder and mental health issues as well.

== Background ==
Daniels' mother first sold her at the age of 15 and was enslaved by drugs for 17 years. With the help of an innovative judicial program called CATCH Court, which detects criminals who are actually victims, she was able to escape in 2015. Most women who are victims of sex trafficking in the United States are marked with tattoos and scars, and Daniels has since transformed the tattoos of her own body to reaffirm control over her life.

After her release from prison, Daniels co-founded the non-profit organization called Reaching For the Shining Starz, which helps potential victims of sex trafficking. She soon became its executive director. On the first outing as a volunteer, she met her little sister Rosie, who had followed a similar path to hers. She continued to visit her every week for a year, until Rosie managed to leave life on the street behind as well. Rosie is now five years sober and working full-time at a drop in center named Sanctuary Night serving women in the bondage of sex trafficking, homelessness and addiction.

Daniels continues to achieve higher education while holding full-time career as Director of Business Development for a treatment center and managing her recovery housing program she created in 2020 serving men and women.

== Recognition ==
She was recognized as one of the BBC's 100 women of 2019.
