= UEFA Player of the Year Award =

The UEFA Player of the Year Award may refer to:

- UEFA Men's Player of the Year Award, the best male footballer in Europe
- UEFA Women's Player of the Year Award, the best female footballer in Europe
