= Nilofar Bayat =

Afghan lawyer and wheelchair basketball player

- نیلوفر بیات
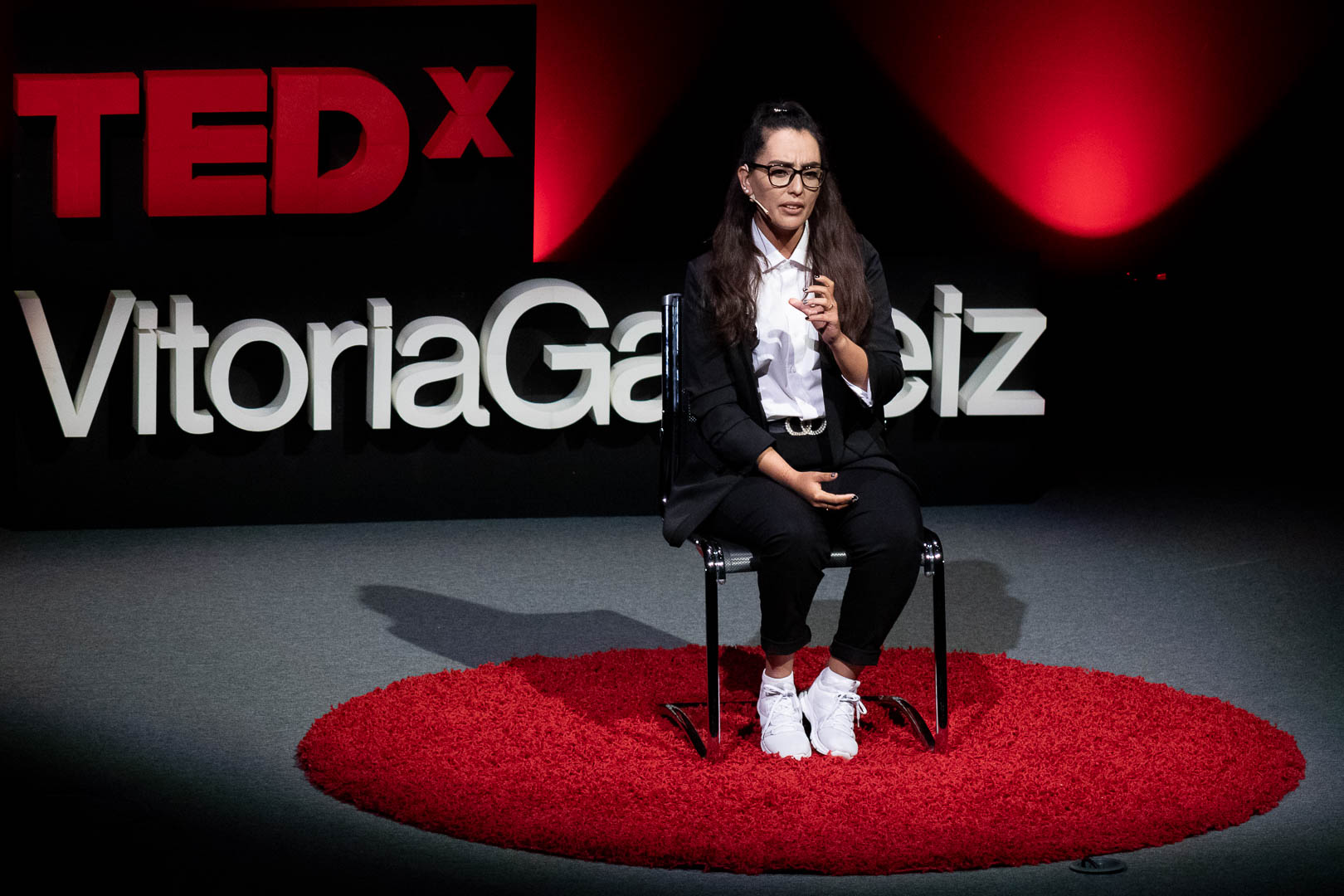
- Born: 1990 (age 35–36); Kabul, Afghanistan

Nilofar Bayat (Persian: نیلوفر بیات) is an Afghan lawyer and wheelchair basketball player and activist who has taken refuge in Spain.

== Early life ==
She grew up in a nontraditional family, which allowed her to play basketball and study law in Kabul, even as a woman and despite having a disability. When she was two years old, a rocket from the Taliban regime hit her house in Kabul damaging her spinal cord, something that completely changed her family and her way of life.

Two days after the Taliban entered Kabul in 2021, Bayat decided to leave for her life. She launched an SOS through journalist friends of his. Antonio Pampliega helped her get out of Kabul, spreading her story through social media and lobbying the Spanish government to grant him a pass to evacuate her from Kabul, along with her husband. On August 20, 2021, they flew to Spain on a Spanish armed forces plane together with a hundred people. She is also entered to the 100 women list of BBC in 2021.
