= Senior Citizens' Day =

Senior Citizens' Day (Note: Also "Citizen's", "Citizens" and "Citizen".) may refer to:

- Senior Citizen's Day, a public holiday in Palau
- National Culture and Senior Citizens Day, a public holiday in Kiribati
- Senior Citizens' Day, a minor observance in Taiwan falling on Double Ninth Day
- National Senior Citizens Day, a minor observance in the United States
- International Day of Older Persons, formerly the International Day of the Elderly, a United Nations observance
- German Senior Citizens' Day, an annual conference on aging and the elderly
