= Old age =

End of life stage

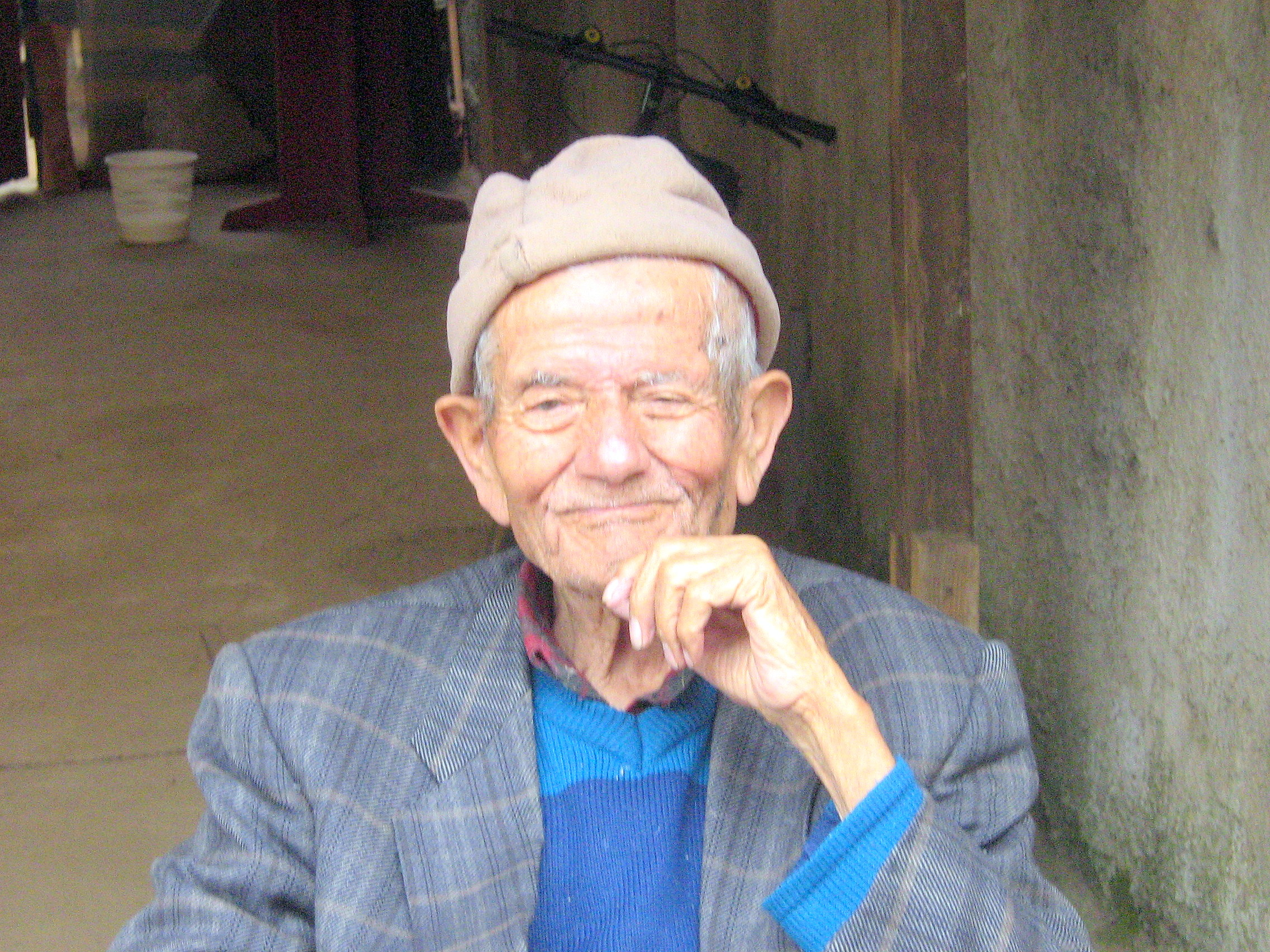
A 93-year-old man from Pichilemu, Chile

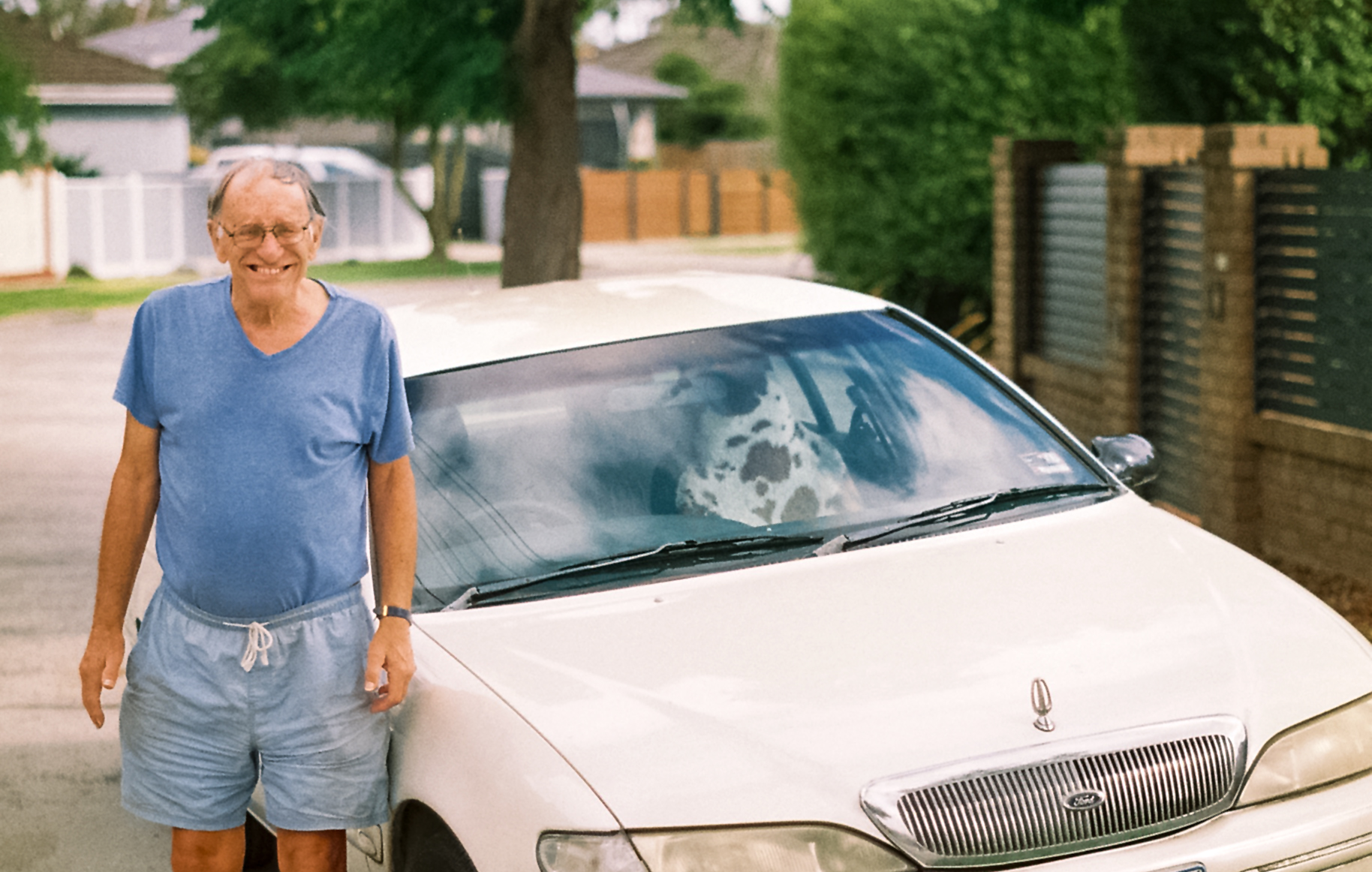
A man in his 70s

Old age is the range of ages for people nearing and surpassing life expectancy. People of old age are called old people, old-timers, the elderly, elders, senior citizens, seniors, or older adults. Old age is not a definite biological stage: the chronological age denoted as "old age" varies culturally and historically. Some disciplines and domains focus on the aging and the aged, such as the organic processes of aging (senescence), medical studies of the aging process (gerontology), diseases that afflict older adults (geriatrics), technology to support the aging society (gerontechnology), and leisure and sport activities adapted to older people (such as senior sport).

Old people often have limited regenerative abilities and are more susceptible to illness and injury than younger adults. They face social problems related to retirement, loneliness, and ageism.

In the United States, a 2023 national poll found that about 37% of older adults aged 50 to 80 experienced loneliness, and 34% reported feeling socially isolated. In response to loneliness among older adults, many nonprofit organizations in North America and the United Kingdom provide companionship through volunteer home visits, phone calls, letters, group activities, and other programs. See also Category:Gerontology organizations and Category:Charities for the elderly.

In 2011, the United Nations proposed a human-rights convention to protect old people.

== History ==
=== European ===
The history of old age in the History of Europe has been characterized by several prominent features across the last 3000 years:

- Consistent age threshold: The chronological threshold for old age has remained consistent throughout European history, typically ranging from 60 to 70 years. This definition has persisted from antiquity to modern times, despite overwhelming social and economic changes.
- Legal and cultural recognition: Old age was always recognized in legal and cultural contexts. The laws often included precise age-based exclusions or provisions for the elderly. Cultural representations, such as the division of the life cycle into age-defined stages, were common and often adapted from earlier Greek, Roman, and Egyptian traditions.
- Changing status: The status of the elderly has varied across different periods. For instance, during the early Middle Ages (5th to 10th centuries), old age gained a more favorable status, particularly for older men, based on the moral worth associated with this life stage and Christian attitudes.

== Definitions ==
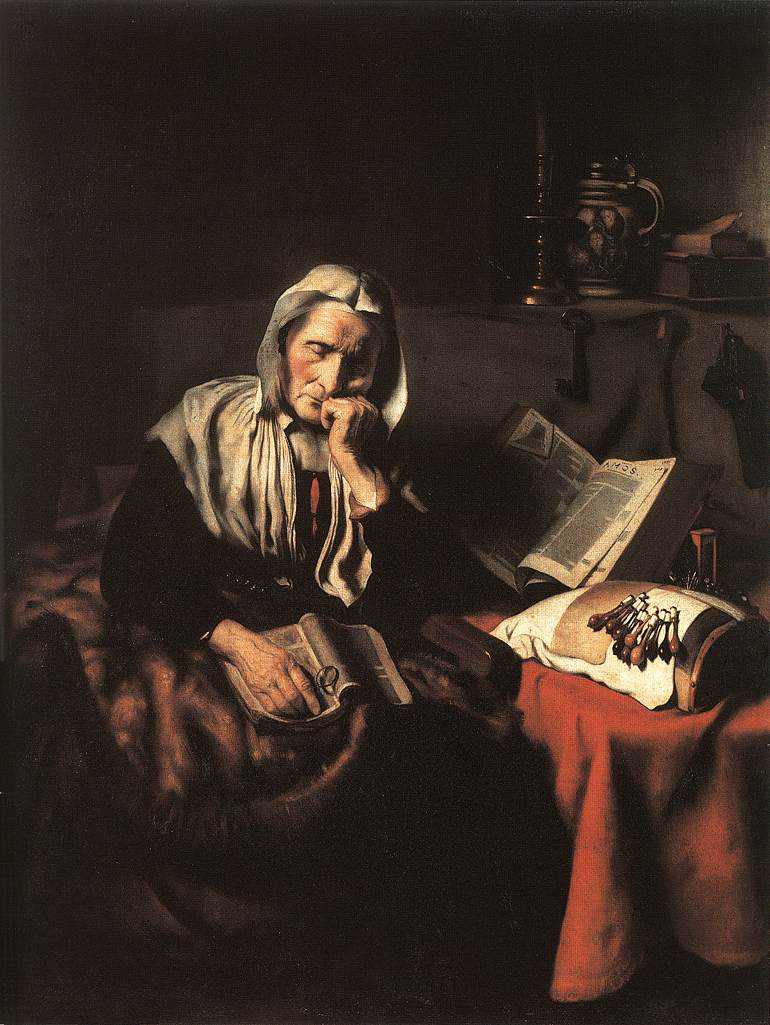
Old Woman Dozing by Nicolaes Maes (1656). Royal Museums of Fine Arts, Brussels

Current definitions of old age include official definitions, sub-group definitions, and four dimensions as follows.

=== Official definitions ===
Most developed Western countries set the retirement age around the age of 65; this is also generally considered to mark the transition from middle to old age. Reaching this age is commonly a requirement to become eligible for senior social programs.

There is no universal official definition of old age. The United Nations considers old age to be 60 years or older. In contrast, a 2001 joint report by the U.S. National Institute on Aging and the World Health Organization [WHO] Regional Office for Africa set the beginning of old age in Sub-Saharan Africa at 50. This lower threshold stems primarily from a different way of thinking about old age in developing nations. Unlike in the developed world, where chronological age determines retirement, societies in developing countries determine old age according to a person's ability to make active contributions to society. This number is also significantly affected by lower life expectancy throughout the developing world. Dating back to the Middle Ages and prior, what European societies considered old age varied depending on the context, but legislative and other texts often give the state of being elderly as being 60 years or more of age.

=== Sub-group definitions ===
Elderly people - road sign in Estonia

Gerontologists have recognized that people experience very different conditions as they approach old age. In developed countries, many people in their later 60s and 70s (frequently called "early old age") are still fit, active, and able to care for themselves. After age 80, they generally become increasingly frail, a condition marked by serious mental and physical debilitation. However, some are "superagers", retaining their vitality and cognitive performance much longer.

Therefore, rather than lumping together all people who have been defined as old, some gerontologists have recognized the diversity of old age by defining sub-groups. One study distinguishes the young-old (60 to 69), the middle-old (70 to 79), and the very old (80+). Another study's sub-grouping is young-old (65 to 74), middle-old (75 to 84), and oldest-old (85+). A third sub-grouping is young-old (65 to 74), old (75 to 84), and old-old (85+). Describing sub-groups in the 65+ population enables a more accurate portrayal of significant life changes.

Two British scholars, Paul Higgs and Chris Gilleard, have added a "fourth age" sub-group. In British English, the "third age" is "the period in life of active retirement, following middle age". Higgs and Gilleard describe the fourth age as "an arena of inactive, unhealthy, unproductive, and ultimately unsuccessful ageing".

=== Dimensions ===
Key Concepts in Social Gerontology lists four dimensions: chronological, biological, psychological, and social. Wattis and Curran add a fifth dimension: developmental. Chronological age may differ considerably from a person's functional age. The distinguishing marks of old age normally occur in all five senses at different times and at different rates for different people. In addition to chronological age, people can be considered old because of the other dimensions of old age. For example, people may be considered old when they become grandparents or when they begin to do less or different work in retirement.

=== Senior citizen ===
Senior citizen is a common euphemism for an old person used in American English, and sometimes in British English. It implies that the person being referred to is retired. This in turn usually implies that the person is over the retirement age, which varies according to country. Synonyms include old age pensioner or pensioner in British English, and retiree and senior in American English. Some dictionaries describe widespread use of "senior citizen" for people over the age of 65.

When defined in a legal context, senior citizen is often used for legal or policy-related reasons in determining who is eligible for certain benefits available to the age group.

It is used in general usage instead of traditional terms such as "old person", "old-age pensioner", or "elderly" as a courtesy and to signify continuing relevance of and respect for this population group as "citizens" of society, of senior "rank".

The term was apparently coined in 1938 during a political campaign. Famed caricaturist Al Hirschfeld claimed on several occasions that his father Isaac Hirschfeld invented the term "senior citizen". It has come into widespread use in recent decades in legislation, commerce, and common speech. Especially in less formal contexts, it is often abbreviated as "senior(s)", which is also used as an adjective.

==== Age qualifications ====
The age of 65 has long been considered the benchmark for senior citizenship in numerous countries. This convention originated from Chancellor Otto von Bismarck's introduction of the pension system in Germany during the late 19th century. Bismarck's legislation set the retirement age at 70, with 65 as the age at which individuals could start receiving a pension. This age standard gradually gained acceptance in other nations and has since become deeply entrenched in public consciousness.

The age which qualifies for senior citizen status varies widely. In governmental contexts, it is usually associated with an age at which pensions or medical benefits for the elderly become available. In commercial contexts, where it may serve as a marketing device to attract customers, the age is often significantly lower.

In commerce, some businesses offer customers of a certain age a "senior discount". The age at which these discounts are available varies from 55, 60, 62 or 65 upwards, and other criteria may also apply. Sometimes a special "senior discount card" or other proof of age needs to be produced to show entitlement.

In the United States, the standard retirement age is currently 66 (gradually increasing to 67). The AARP allows couples in which one spouse has reached the age of 50 to join, regardless of the age of the other spouse.

In Canada, the Old Age Security (OAS) pension is available at 65 (the Conservative government of Stephen Harper had planned to gradually increase the age of eligibility to 67, starting in the years 2023–2029; instead, the Liberal government of Justin Trudeau increased payments for those over 75 above that for those aged 65–74), and the Canada Pension Plan (CPP) as early as age 60.

== Signs ==
The distinguishing characteristics of old age are both physical and mental. The marks of old age are so unlike the marks of middle age that legal scholar Richard Posner suggests that, as an individual transitions into old age, that person can be thought of as different people "time-sharing" the same identity.

These marks do not occur at the same chronological age for everyone. Also, they occur at different rates and order for different people. Marks of old age can easily vary between people of the same chronological age.

A basic mark of old age that affects both body and mind is "slowness of behavior". The term describes a correlation between advancing age and slowness of reaction and physical and mental task performance. However, studies from Buffalo University and Northwestern University have shown that the elderly are a happier age group than their younger counterparts.

=== Physical ===
Physical marks of old age include the following:

- Bone and joint problems: Old bones are marked by "thinning and shrinkage". This might result in a loss of height (about two inches (5 cm) by age 80), a stooping posture in many people, and a greater susceptibility to bone and joint diseases such as osteoarthritis and osteoporosis.
- Chronic diseases: Some older people have at least one chronic condition and many have multiple conditions. In 2007–2009, the most frequently occurring conditions among older people in the United States were uncontrolled hypertension (34%), arthritis (50%), and heart disease (32%).
- Chronic mucus hypersecretion (CMH), defined as "coughing and bringing up sputum", is a common respiratory symptom in elderly people.
- Dental problems: Older people may have less saliva and reduced ability to maintain oral hygiene, consequently increasing the chance of tooth decay and infection.
- Digestive system issues: About 40% of the time, old age is marked by digestive disorders such as difficulty in swallowing, inability to eat enough and to absorb nutrition, constipation and bleeding.
- Essential tremor (ET): An uncontrollable shaking in a part of the upper body. It is more common in the elderly and symptoms worsen with age.
- Eyesight deterioration: Presbyopia can occur by age 50 and it hinders reading, especially of small print in low lighting. The speed with which an individual reads and the ability to locate objects may also be impaired. By age 80, more than half of all Americans either have a cataract or have had cataract surgery.
- Falls: Old age increases the risk of injury from falls. Every year, about a third of those 65 years old and more than half of those 80 years old fall. Falls are the leading cause of injury and death for old people.
- Gait change: Some aspects of gait normally change with old age. Speed slows after age 70. Time with both feet on the ground ("double stance") increases. Old people sometimes move as if they were walking carefully on ice.
- Hair usually turns gray and may become thinner. About age 50, about 50% of Europeans have 50% grey hair. Many men are affected by balding.
- Hearing loss: By age 75, 48% of men and 37% of women have lost at least some significant hearing. Of the 26.7 million people [where?] over age 50 with a hearing impairment, one seventh use hearing aids. In the 70–79 age range, partial hearing loss affecting communication rises to 65%, mostly in low-income men.
- The heart's left ventricular mass increases with age. Hearts can become less efficient in old age, lessening stamina. Atherosclerosis can constrict blood flow.
- Immune-function loss (immunosenescence).
- Lungs may expand less efficiently, providing less oxygen.
- Mobility impairment or loss: "Impairment in mobility affects 14% of those between 65 and 74, [and] half of those over 85." Loss of mobility is common in old people and has serious "social, psychological, and physical consequences".
- Pain: 25% of seniors have chronic pain, increasing with age, up to 80% of those in nursing homes. Most pains are rheumatological, musculoskeletal-related, or malignant.
- Decreases in sexual drive in both men and women. Increasing research on sexual behavior and desires in later life is challenging the "asexual" image of older adults. People aged 75–102 do experience sensuality and sexual pleasure. Sexual attitudes and identity are established in early adulthood and change little. Sexuality remains important throughout life, and the sexual expression of "typical, healthy older persons is a relatively neglected topic of research". Other known sexual behaviors in older age groups include sexual thoughts, fantasies, and dreams; masturbation; oral sex; and vaginal and anal intercourse.
- Skin loses elasticity and gets drier and more lined and wrinkled.
- Wounds take longer to heal and are more likely to leave permanent scars.
- Trouble sleeping and daytime sleepiness affect more than half of seniors. In a study of 9,000 people with a mean age of 74, only 12% reported no sleep complaints. By age 65, deep sleep drops to about 5% of sleep time.
- Taste buds diminish by up to half by the age of 80. Food becomes less appealing and nutrition can suffer.
- Over the age of 85, thirst perception decreases, so that 41% of the elderly do not drink enough.
- Urinary incontinence is often found in old age.
- Vocal cords weaken and vibrate more slowly. This results in a weakened, breathy voice, "old person's voice".

=== Mental ===
Mental marks of old age include the following:

- Agreeability: Despite the stressfulness of old age, the words "agreeable" and "accepting" are used commonly to describe people of old age. However, in some people, the dependence that comes with old age induces feelings of incompetence and worthlessness from having to rely on others for many different basic living functions.
- Caution follows closely with old age. This antipathy toward "risk-taking" often stems from the fact that old people have less to gain and more to lose than younger people.
- Depressed mood. According to Cox, Abramson, Devine, and Hollon (2012), old age is a risk factor for depression caused by prejudice. When younger people are prejudiced against the elderly and then become old themselves, their anti-elderly prejudice turns inward, causing depression. "People with more negative age stereotypes will likely have higher rates of depression as they get older." Old age depression results in the 65+ population having the highest suicide rate.
- Fear of crime in old age, especially among the frail, sometimes weighs more heavily than concerns about finances or health and restricts what they do. The fear persists in spite of the fact that old people are victims of crime less often than younger people.
- Increasing fear of health problems.
- Mental disorders affect about 15% of people aged 60+ according to estimates by the World Health Organization. Another survey taken in 15 countries reported that mental disorders of adults interfered with their daily activities more than physical problems.
- Reduced mental and cognitive ability: Memory loss is common in old age due to the brain's decreased ability to encode, store, and retrieve information. It takes more time to learn the same amount of new information. The prevalence of dementia increases in old age from about 10% at age 65 to about 50% over age 85. Alzheimer's disease accounts for 50 to 80 percent of dementia cases. Demented behavior can include wandering, physical aggression, verbal outbursts, depression, and psychosis.
- Stubbornness: A study of over 400 seniors found a "preference for the routine". Explanations include old age's toll on "fluid intelligence" and the "more deeply entrenched" ways of the old.

=== Skill-related ===
A study of professional and master tenpin bowlers found that average scores declined less than 10% from age 20 to age 70. This decline in a sport focusing on skill and technique is considerably smaller than that of events dominated by muscular strength, cardiovascular endurance or agility—which are known to decrease about 10% per decade.

== Perspectives ==
=== Middle age ===
Many books written by authors in middle adulthood depict a few common perceptions on old age. One writer notices the change in his parents: They move slowly, they have less strength, they repeat stories, their minds wander, and they fret. Another writer sees her aged parents and is bewildered: They refuse to follow her advice, they are obsessed with the past, they avoid risk, and they live at a "glacial pace".

In her The Denial of Aging, Dr. Muriel R. Gillick, a baby boomer, accuses her contemporaries of believing that by proper exercise and diet they can avoid the scourges of old age and proceed from middle age to death. Studies find that many people in the 65–84 range can postpone morbidity by practicing healthy lifestyles. However, at about age 85, most people experience similar morbidity. Even with healthy lifestyles, most 85+ people will undergo extended "frailty and disability".

=== Old age ===
Early old age can be a pleasant time; children are grown, work is over, and there is time to pursue other interests. Many old people are also willing to get involved in community and activist organizations to promote their well-being. In contrast, perceptions of old age by writers 80+ years old tend to be negative.

Georges Minois writes that the first man known to talk about his old age was an Egyptian scribe who lived 4,500 years ago. The scribe addressed God with a prayer of lament:

O Sovereign my Lord! Oldness has come; old age has descended. Feebleness has arrived; dotage is here anew. The heart sleeps wearily every day.
The eyes are weak, the ears are deaf, the strength is disappearing because of weariness of the heart and the mouth is silent and cannot speak.
The heart is forgetful and cannot recall yesterday. The bone suffers old age. Good is become evil. All taste is gone. What old age does to men is evil in every respect.

Minois comments that the scribe's "cry shows that nothing has changed in the drama of decrepitude between the age of the Pharaoh and the atomic age" and "expresses all the anguish of old people in the past and the present".

Lillian Rubin, active in her 80s as an author, sociologist, and psychotherapist, opens her book 60 on Up: The Truth about Aging in America with "getting old sucks. It always has, it always will." Dr. Rubin contrasts the "real old age" with the "rosy pictures" painted by middle-age writers.

Writing at the age of 87, Mary C. Morrison describes the "heroism" required by old age: to live through the disintegration of one's own body or that of someone one loves. Morrison concludes, "old age is not for the fainthearted". In the book Life Beyond 85 Years, the 150 interviewees had to cope with physical and mental debilitation and with losses of loved ones. One interviewee described living in old age as "pure hell".

Research has shown that in high-income countries, on average, one in four people over 60 and one in three over 75 feels lonely.

==== Misconceptions ====
Johnson and Barer did a pioneering study of Life Beyond 85 Years by interviews over a six-year period. In talking with 85-year-olds and older, they found some popular conceptions about old age to be erroneous. Such erroneous conceptions include (1) people in old age have at least one family member for support, (2) old age well-being requires social activity, and (3) "successful adaptation" to age-related changes demands a continuity of self-concept. In their interviews, Johnson and Barer found that 24% of the 85+ had no face-to-face family relationships; many have outlived their families. Second, that contrary to popular notions, the interviews revealed that the reduced activity and socializing of the over-85s does not harm their well-being; they "welcome increased detachment". Third, rather than a continuity of self-concept, as the interviewees faced new situations they changed their "cognitive and emotional processes" and reconstituted their "self–representation".

=== Societal and historical ===
Based on his survey of old age in history, Georges Minois concludes that "it is clear that always and everywhere youth has been preferred to old age". In Western thought, "old age is an evil, an infirmity and a dreary time of preparation for death". Furthermore, death is often preferred over "decrepitude, because death means deliverance".

"The problem of the ambiguity of old age has ... been with us since the stage of primitive society; it was both the source of wisdom and of infirmity, experience and decrepitude, of prestige and suffering."

In the Classical period of Greek and Roman cultures, old age was denigrated as a time of "decline and decrepitude". "Beauty and strength" were esteemed and old age was viewed as defiling and ugly. Old age was reckoned as one of the unanswerable "great mysteries" along with evil, pain, and suffering. "Decrepitude, which shrivels heroes, seemed worse than death."

Historical periods reveal a mixed picture of the "position and status" of old people, but there has never been a "golden age of aging". Studies have challenged the popular belief that in the past old people were venerated by society and cared for by their families. Veneration for and antagonism toward the aged have coexisted in complex relationships throughout history. "Old people were respected or despised, honoured or put to death according to circumstance."

In ancient times, those who were frail were seen as a burden and ignored or, in extreme cases, killed. People were defined as "old" because of their inability to perform useful tasks rather than their years.

Although he was skeptical of the gods, Aristotle concurred in the dislike of old people. In his Ethics, he wrote that "old people are miserly; they do not acknowledge disinterested friendship; only seeking for what can satisfy their selfish needs".

The Medieval and Renaissance periods depicted old age as "cruel or weak".

The 16th-century Utopians Thomas More and Antonio de Guevara allowed no decrepit old people in their fictional lands.

For Thomas More, on the island of Utopia, when people are so old as to have "out-lived themselves" and are terminally ill, in pain, and a burden to everyone, the priests exhort them about choosing to die. The priests assure them that "they shall be happy after death". If they choose to die, they end their lives by starvation or by taking opium.

Antonio de Guevara's utopian nation "had a custom, not to live longer than sixty five years". At that age, they practiced self-immolation. Rather than condemn the practice, Bishop Guevara called it a "golden world" in which people "have overcome the natural appetite to desire to live".

==== Contemporary perspectives ====
In the modern period, the cultural status of old people has declined in many cultures. Joan Erikson observed that "aged individuals are often ostracized, neglected, and overlooked; elders are seen no longer as bearers of wisdom but as embodiments of shame".

Attitudes toward old age well-being vary somewhat between cultures. For example, in the United States, being healthy, physically, and socially active are signs of a good old age. On the other hand, Africans focus more on food and material security and a helpful family when describing old age well-being. Additionally, Koreans are more anxious about aging and more scared of old people than Americans are.

Research on age-related attitudes consistently finds that negative attitudes exceed positive attitudes toward old people because of their looks and behavior. In his study Aging and Old Age, Posner discovers "resentment and disdain of older people" in American society. Harvard University's implicit-association test measures implicit "attitudes and beliefs" about "Young vis a vis Old". Blind Spot: Hidden Biases of Good People, a book about the test, reports that 80% of Americans have an "automatic preference for the young over old" and that attitude is true worldwide. The young are "consistent in their negative attitude" toward the old. Ageism documents that Americans generally have "little tolerance for older persons and very few reservations about harboring negative attitudes" about them.

Despite its prevalence, ageism is seldom the subject of public discourse.

=== Simulated ===
Simone de Beauvoir wrote that "there is one form of experience that belongs only to those that are old – that of old age itself". Nevertheless, simulations of old age attempt to help younger people gain some understanding.

Texas A&M University offers a plan for an "Aging Simulation" workshop. The workshop is adapted from Sensitizing People to the Processes of Aging. Some of the simulations include:

- Sight: Wearing swimmer's goggles with black paper pasted to lens with only a small hole to simulate tunnel vision
- Hearing: Use ear plugs to dull the sound of people talking
- Touch: Trying to button a shirt or buckle a belt while wearing thick gloves
- Dexterity: Unscrew a jar lid with tape around several fingers
- Mobility and balance: Carry packages in one hand while using a walker

The Macklin Intergenerational Institute conducts Xtreme Aging workshops, as depicted in The New York Times. A condensed version was presented on NBC's Today Show and is available online. One exercise was to lay out 3 sets of 5 slips of paper. On set #1, write the 5 most enjoyed activities; on set #2, write the 5 most valued possessions; on set #3, write the 5 most loved people. Then "lose" them one by one, trying to feel each loss, until one has lost them all, as happens in old age.

== Frailty ==
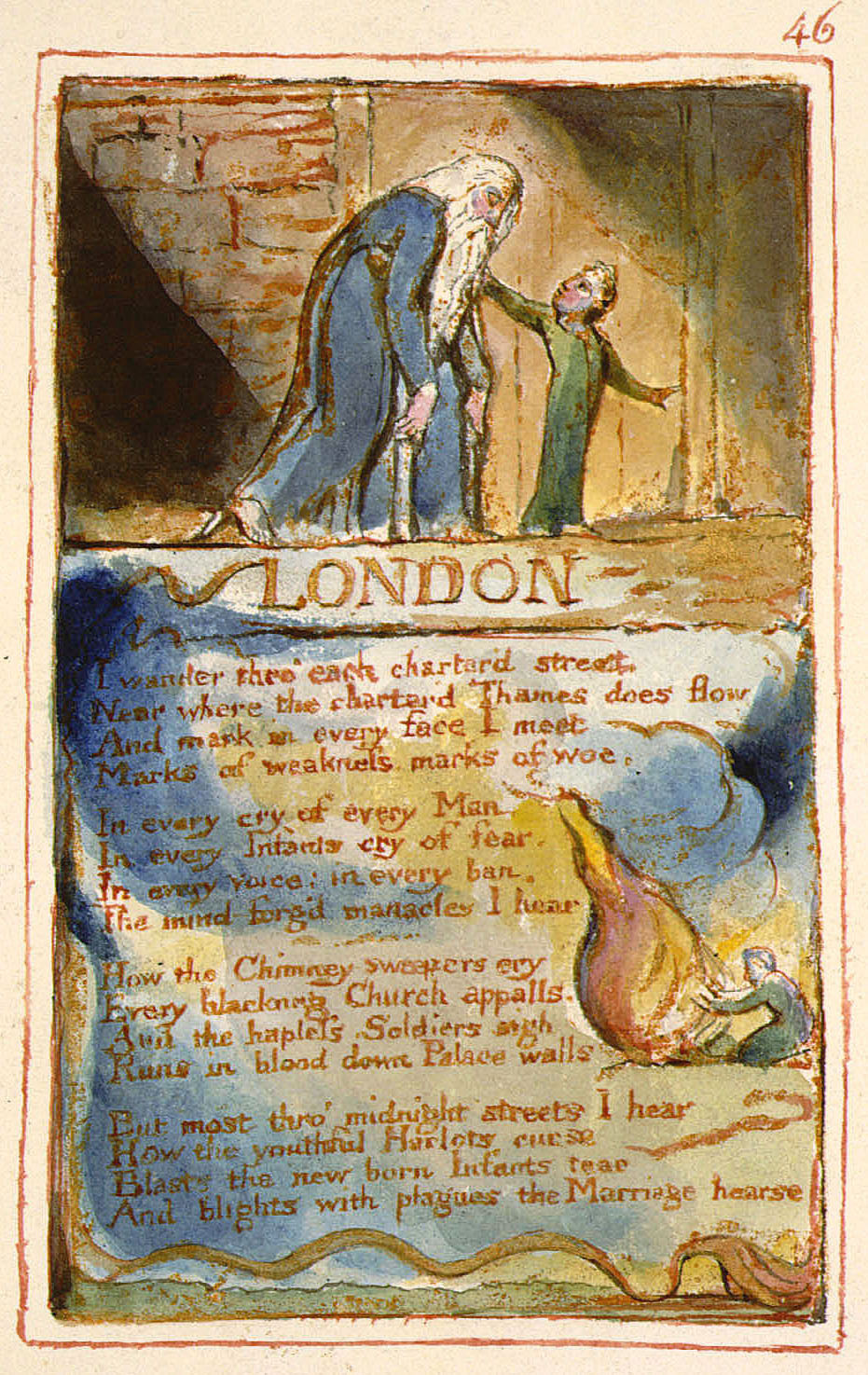
An image of an elderly man being guided by a young child accompanies William Blake's poem London, from his Songs of Innocence and Experience

Most people in the age range of 65–79 (the years of retirement and early old age) enjoy rich possibilities for a full life, but the condition of frailty, distinguished by "bodily failure" and greater dependence, becomes increasingly common from around age 80. In the United States, hospital discharge data from 2003 to 2011 shows that injury was the most common reason for hospitalization among patients aged 65+.

Gerontologists note the lack of research regarding and the difficulty in defining frailty. However, they add that physicians recognize frailty when they see it.

A group of geriatricians proposed a general definition of frailty as "a physical state of increased vulnerability to stressors that results from decreased reserves and disregulation in multiple physiological systems".

Frailty is a common condition in later old age but different definitions of frailty produce diverse assessments of prevalence. One study placed the incidence of frailty for ages 65+ at 10.7%. Another study placed the incidence of frailty in age 65+ population at 22% for women and 15% for men. A Canadian study illustrated how frailty increases with age and calculated the prevalence for 65+ as 22.4% and for 85+ as 43.7%.

A worldwide study of "patterns of frailty" based on data from 20 nations found (a) a consistent correlation between frailty and age, (b) a higher frequency among women, and (c) more frailty in wealthier nations where greater support and medical care increases longevity.

In Norway, a 20-year longitudinal study of 400 people found that bodily failure and greater dependence became prevalent in the 80+ years. The study calls these years the "fourth age" or "old age in the real meaning of the term". Similarly, the "Berlin Aging Study" rated overall functionality on four levels: good, medium, poor, and very poor. People in their 70s were mostly rated good. In the 80–90 year range, the four levels of functionality were divided equally. By the 90–100 year range, 60% would be considered frail because of very poor functionality and only 5% still possessed good functionality.

=== Markers ===
Three unique markers of frailty have been proposed: (a) loss of any notion of invincibility, (b) loss of ability to do things essential to one's care, and (c) loss of possibility for a subsequent life stage.

Old age survivors on average deteriorate from agility in their early retirement years (65–79) to a period of frailty preceding death. This deterioration is gradual for some and precipitous for others. Frailty is marked by an array of chronic physical and mental problems which means that frailty is not treatable as a specific disease. These problems, coupled with increased dependency in the basic activities of daily living (ADLs) required for personal care, add emotional problems: depression and anxiety. In some, frailty has been depicted as a group of "complex issues", distinct but "causally interconnected", that often include "comorbid diseases", progressive weakness, stress, exhaustion, and depression.

Healthy humans after age 50, accumulate endogenous DNA single- and double-strand breaks in a linear fashion in cellular DNA. Other forms of DNA damage also increase with age. After age 50 a decline in DNA repair capability also occurs. These findings are in accord with the theory that DNA damage is a fundamental aspect of aging in older people.

=== Care and costs ===
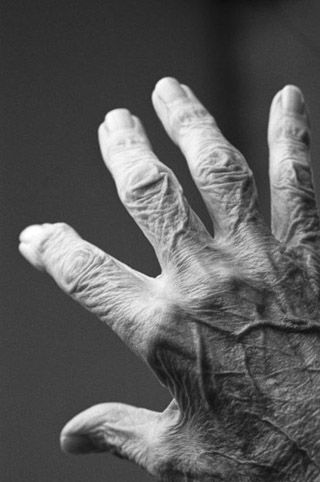
The hand of an elderly person

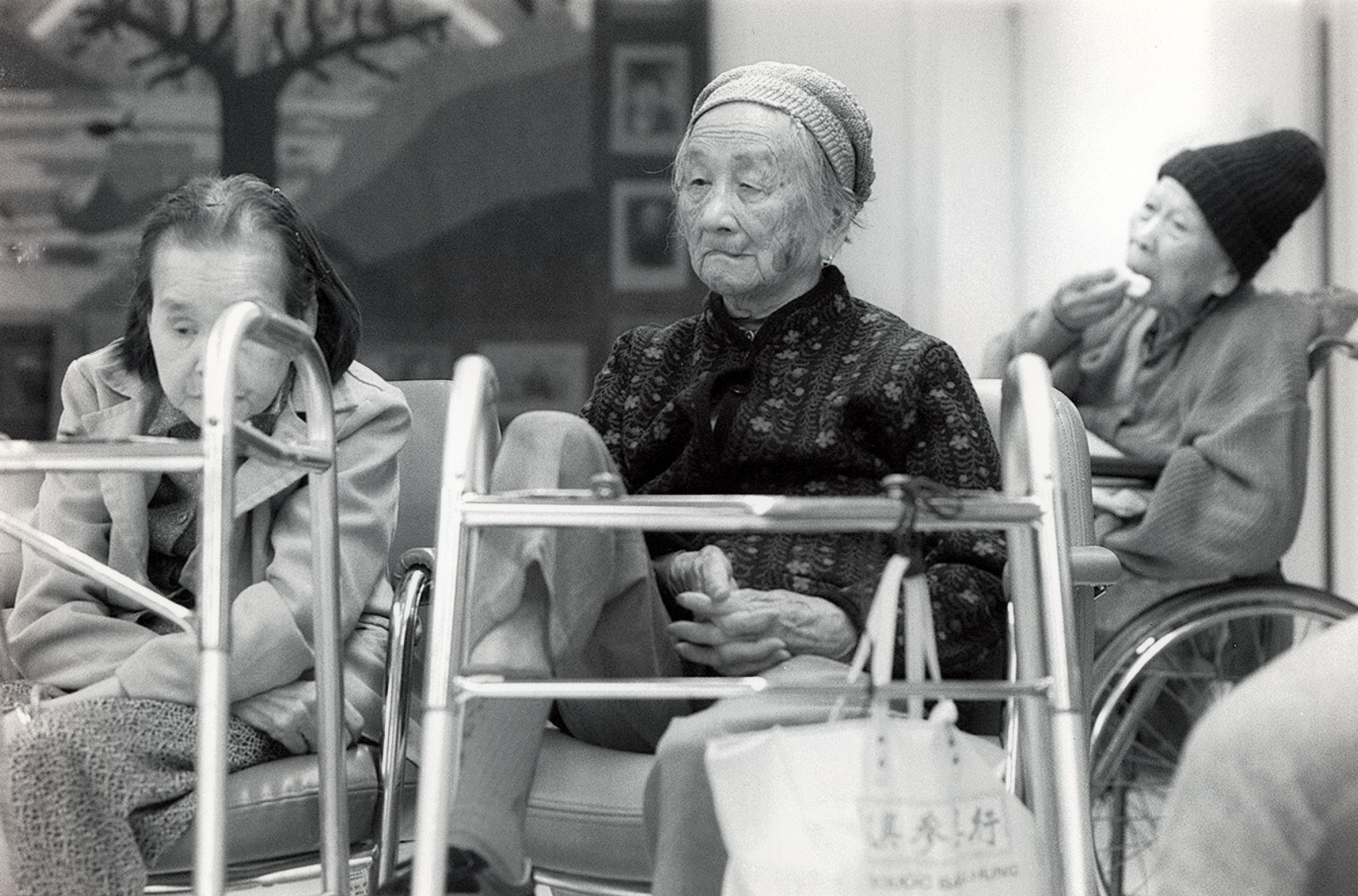
Women at the On Lok Senior Health Services day care program in San Francisco, late 1970s

Frail people require a high level of care. Medical advances have made it possible to extend life, or "postpone death", at old age for years. This added time costs many frail people "prolonged sickness, dependence, pain, and suffering".

According to a study by the Agency for Healthcare Research and Quality (AHRQ), the rate of emergency department visits was consistently highest among patients ages 85 years and older in 2006–2011 in the United States. Additionally, patients aged 65+ had the highest percentage of hospital stays for adults with multiple chronic conditions but the second highest percentage of hospital costs in 2003–2014.

These final years are also costly in economic terms. One out of every four Medicare dollars is spent on the frail in their last year of life, in attempts to postpone death.

Medical treatments in the final days are not only economically costly, but they are often unnecessary or even harmful. Nortin Hadler, M.D. warns against the tendency to medicalize and overtreat the frail. In her Choosing Medical Care in Old Age, Michael R. Gillick M.D. argues that appropriate medical treatment for the frail is not the same as for the robust. The frail are vulnerable to "being tipped over" by any physical stress put on the system such as medical interventions.

In addition to everyday care, frail elderly people and others with disabilities are particularly vulnerable during natural disasters. They may be unable or unwilling to evacuate to avoid a hurricane or wildfire.

=== Death ===
Old age, death, and frailty are closely linked, with approximately half the deaths in old age preceded by months or years of frailty.

Older Adults' Views on Death is based on interviews with 109 people in the 70–90 age range, with a mean age of 80.7. Almost 20% of the people wanted to use whatever treatment that might postpone death. About the same number said that, given a terminal illness, they would choose assisted suicide. Roughly half chose doing nothing except live day by day until death comes naturally without medical or other intervention designed to prolong life. This choice was coupled with a desire to receive palliative care if needed.

About half of older adults have multimorbidity, that is, they have three or more chronic conditions. Medical advances have made it possible to "postpone death", but in many cases this postponement adds "prolonged sickness, dependence, pain, and suffering", a time that is costly in social, psychological, and economic terms.

The longitudinal interviews of 150 age 85+ people summarized in Life Beyond 85 Years found "progressive terminal decline" in the year prior to death: constant fatigue, much sleep, detachment from people, things, and activities, simplified lives. Most of the interviewees did not fear death; some would welcome it. One person said, "Living this long is pure hell." However, nearly everyone feared a long process of dying. Some wanted to die in their sleep; others wanted to die "on their feet".

The study of Older Adults' Views on Death found that the more frail people were, the more "pain, suffering, and struggles" they were enduring, the more likely they were to "accept and welcome" death as a release from their misery. Their fear about the process of dying was that it would prolong their distress. Besides being a release from misery, some saw death as a way to reunite with deceased loved ones. Others saw death as a way to free their caretakers from the burden of their care.

== Religiosity ==
Generally speaking, old people have always been more religious than young people. At the same time, wide cultural variations exist.

In the United States, 90% of old age Hispanics view themselves as very, quite, or somewhat religious. The Pew Research Center's study of black and white old people found that 62% of those in ages 65–74 and 70% in ages 75+ asserted that religion was "very important" to them. For all 65+ people, more women (76%) than men (53%) and more blacks (87%) than whites (63%) consider religion "very important" to them. This compares to 54% in the 30–49 age range.

In a British 20-year longitudinal study, less than half of the old people surveyed said that religion was "very important" to them, and a quarter said they had become less religious in old age. The late-life rise in religiosity is stronger in Japan than in the United States, but in the Netherlands it is minimal.

In the practice of religion, a study of 60+ people found that 25% read the Bible every day and over 40% watch religious television. Pew Research found that in the age 65+ range, 75% of whites and 87% of blacks pray daily. When comparing religiosity, the individual practice may be a more accurate measure than participation in organized religion. With organized religion, participation may often be hindered due to transportation or health problems.

== Demographic changes ==
In the industrialized countries, life expectancy and, thus, the old age population have increased consistently over the last decades. In the United States the proportion of people aged 65 or older increased from 4% in 1900 to about 12% in 2000. In 1900, only about 3 million of the nation's citizens were 65 or older (out of 76 million total American citizens). By 2000, the number of senior citizens had increased to about 35 million (of 280 million US citizens). Population experts estimate that more than 50 million Americans—about 17 percent of the population—will be 65 or older in 2020. By 2050, it is projected that at least 400,000 Americans will be 100 or older.

The number of old people is growing around the world chiefly because of the post–World War II baby boom and increases in the provision and standards of health care. By 2050, 33% of the developed world's population and almost 20% of the less developed world's population will be over 60 years old.

The growing number of people living to their 80s and 90s in the developed world has strained public welfare systems and has also resulted in increased incidence of diseases like cancer and dementia that were rarely seen in premodern times. When the United States Social Security program was created, people older than 65 numbered only around 5% of the population and the average life expectancy of a 65-year-old in 1936 was approximately 5 years, while in 2011 it could often range from 10 to 20 years. Other issues that can arise from an increasing population are growing demands for health care and an increase in demand for different types of services.

Of the roughly 150,000 people who die each day across the globe, about two thirds—100,000 per day—die of age-related causes. In industrialized nations, the proportion is much higher, reaching 90%.

== Psychosocial aspects ==
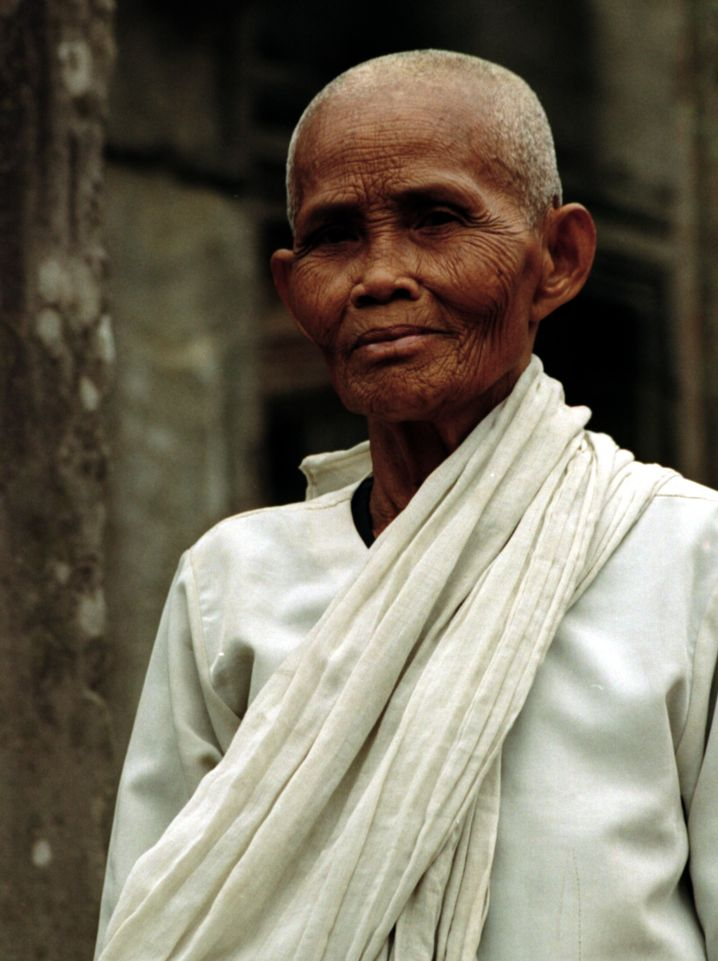
An elderly Khmer woman

According to Erik Erikson's "Stages of Psychosocial Development", the human personality is developed in a series of eight stages that take place from the time of birth and continue on throughout an individual's complete life. He characterises old age as a period of "Integrity vs. Despair", during which people focus on reflecting back on their lives. Those who are unsuccessful during this phase will feel that their life has been wasted and will experience many regrets. The individual will be left with feelings of bitterness and despair. Those who feel proud of their accomplishments will feel a sense of integrity. Successfully completing this phase means looking back with few regrets and a general feeling of satisfaction. These individuals will attain wisdom, even when confronting death. Coping is a very important skill needed in the aging process to move forward with life and not be 'stuck' in the past. The way people adapt and cope, reflects their aging process on a psycho-social level.

For people in their 80s and 90s, Joan Erikson added a ninth stage in The Life Cycle Completed: Extended Version. As she wrote, she added the ninth stage because the Integrity of the eighth stage imposes "a serious demand on the senses of elders" and the Wisdom of the eighth stage requires capacities that ninth stage elders "do not usually have".

Newman & Newman also proposed a ninth stage of life, Elderhood. Elderhood refers to those individuals who live past the life expectancy of their birth cohorts. They described two different types of people in this stage of life. The "young old" are the healthy individuals who can function on their own without assistance and can complete their daily tasks independently, while the "old old" are those who depend on specific services due to declining health or diseases.

=== Theories ===
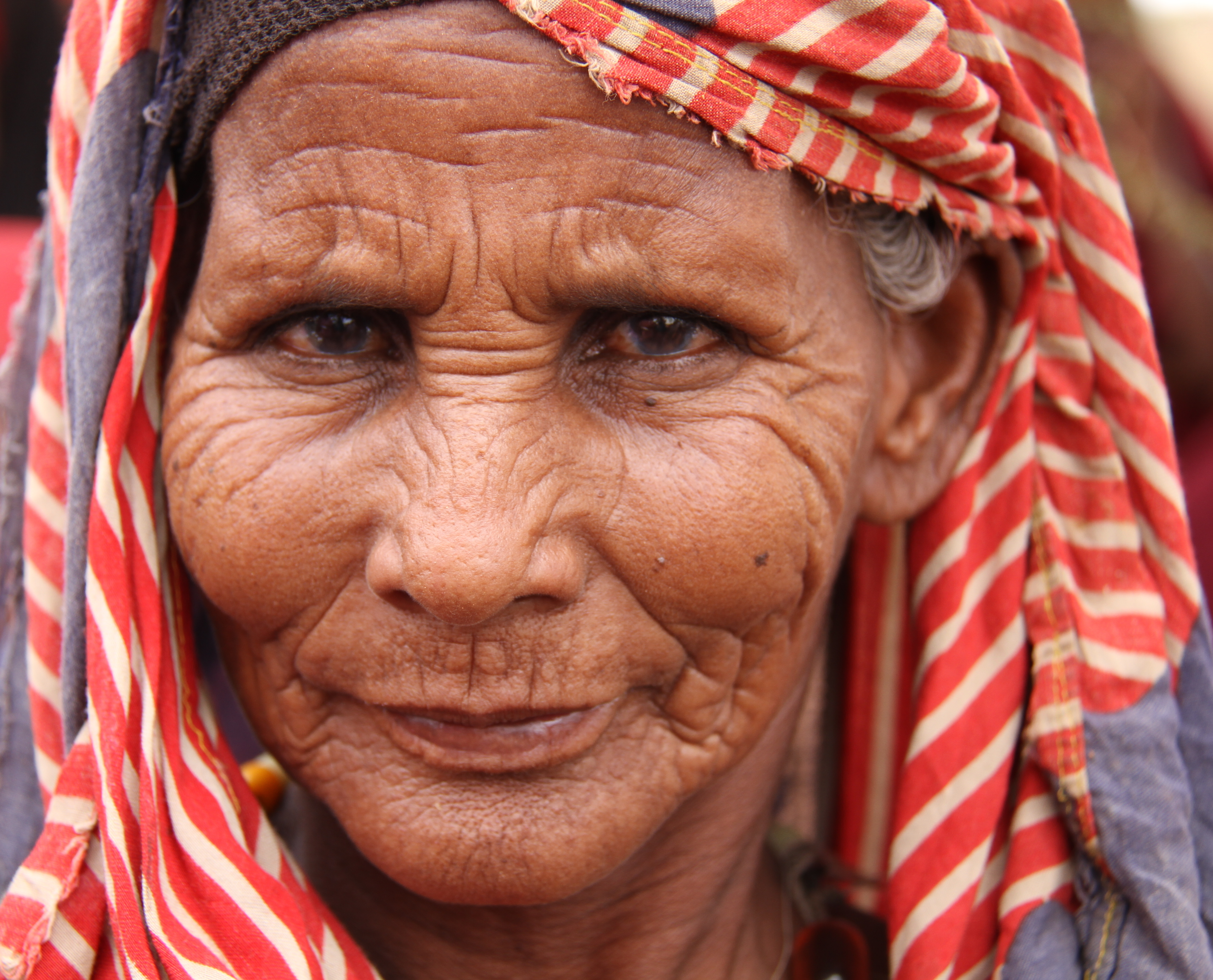
An elderly Somali woman

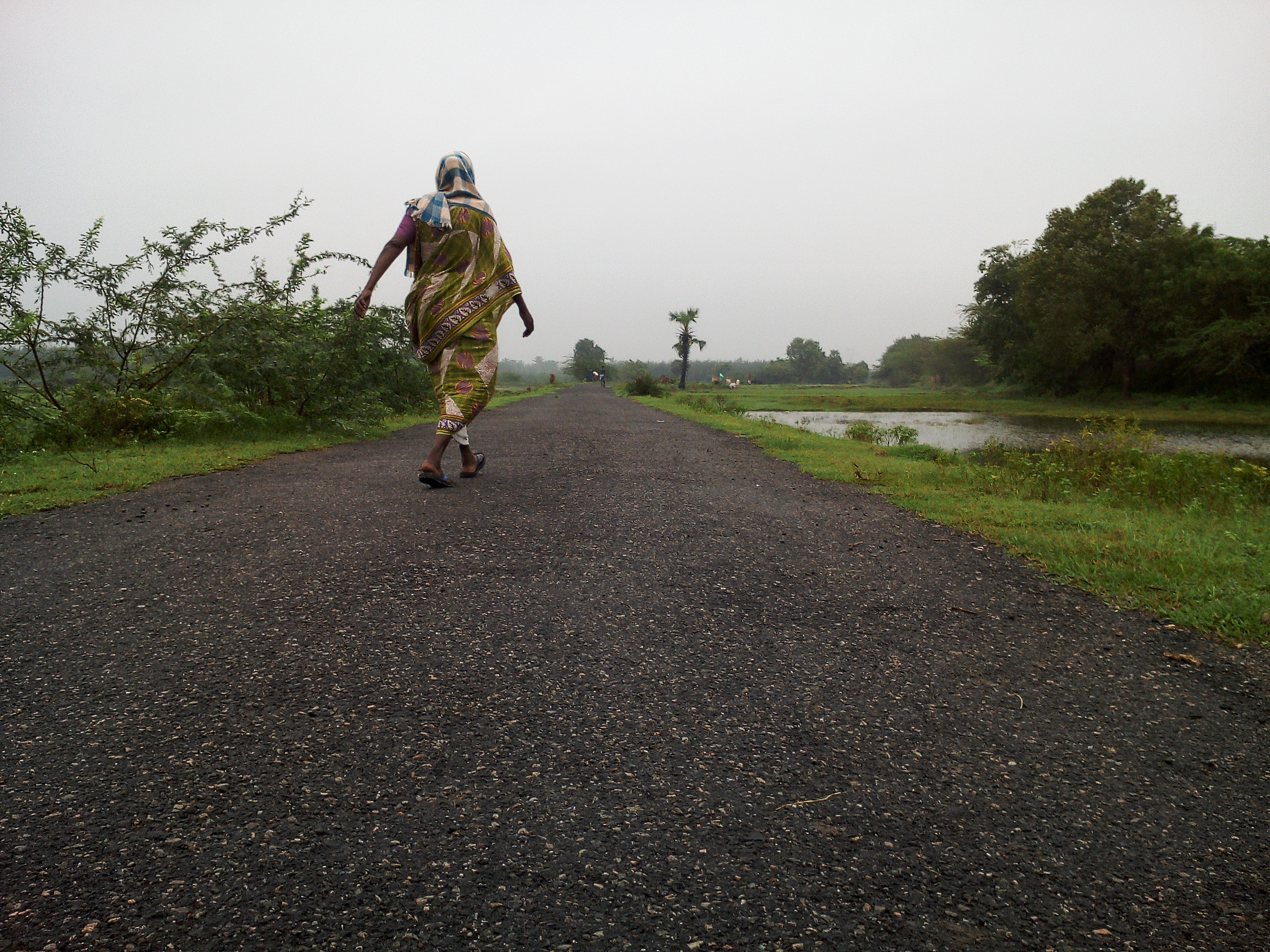
An elderly woman walks along a road.

Social theories, or concepts, propose explanations for the distinctive relationships between old people and their societies.

One theory, proposed in 1961, is the disengagement theory, which proposes that, in old age, a mutual disengagement between people and their society occurs in anticipation of death. By becoming disengaged from work and family responsibilities, according to this concept, people are enabled to enjoy their old age without stress. This theory has been subjected to the criticism that old age disengagement is neither natural, inevitable, nor beneficial. Furthermore, disengaging from social ties in old age is not across the board: unsatisfactory ties are dropped and satisfying ones kept.

In opposition to the disengagement theory, the activity theory of old age argues that disengagement in old age occurs not by desire, but by the barriers to social engagement imposed by society. This theory has been faulted for not factoring in psychological changes that occur in old age as shown by reduced activity, even when available. It has also been found that happiness in old age is not proportional to activity.

According to the continuity theory, in spite of the inevitable differences imposed by their old age, most people try to maintain continuity in personhood, activities, and relationships with their younger days.

Socioemotional selectivity theory also depicts how people maintain continuity in old age. The focus of this theory is continuity sustained by social networks, albeit networks narrowed by choice and by circumstances. The choice is for more harmonious relationships. The circumstances are loss of relationships by death and distance.

== Life expectancy ==
Life expectancy by nation at birth in the year 2011 ranged from 48 years to 82 years. Low values were caused by high death rates for infants and children.

In almost all countries, women, on average, live longer than men. The disparities vary between 12 years in Russia to no difference or higher life expectancy for men in countries such as Zimbabwe and Uganda.

The number of elderly people worldwide began to surge in the second half of the 20th century. In developed countries before then, five or less percent of the population was over 65. Few lived longer than their 70s and people who attained advanced age (i.e. their 80s) were rare enough to be a novelty and were revered as wise sages. The worldwide over-65 population in 1960 was one-third of the under-5 population. By 2013, the over-65 population had grown to equal the under-5 population and is projected to double the under-5 population by 2050.

Before the surge in the over-65 population, accidents and disease claimed many people before they could attain old age, and health problems in those over 65 meant a quick death in most cases. If a person lived to an advanced age, it was generally due to genetic factors or a relatively easy lifestyle, since diseases of old age could not be treated before the 20th century.

In October 2016, a group of scientists identified the maximum human lifespan at an average age of 115, with an absolute upper limit of 125 years. However, the concept of a maximum lifespan of humans is still widely debated among the scientific community.

== Benefits ==
German chancellor Otto von Bismarck created the world's first comprehensive government social safety net in the 1880s, providing for old age pensions. It was a political solution by conservatives to weaken the socialist movement.

In the United States of America, and the United Kingdom, 65 (UK 60 for women) was traditionally the age of retirement with full old age benefits.

In 2003, the age at which a United States citizen became eligible for full Social Security benefits began to increase gradually, and will continue to do so until it reaches 67 in 2027. Full retirement age for Social Security benefits for people retiring in 2012 is age 66. In the United Kingdom, the state pension age for men and women will rise to 66 in 2020 with further increases scheduled after that.

Originally, the purpose of old age pensions was to open up jobs for younger unemployed people, and also prevent elderly people from being reduced to beggary, which is still common in some underdeveloped countries, but growing life expectancies and older populations have brought into question the model under which pension systems were designed. Some complained that "powerful" and "greedy", old people were getting more than their share of the nation's resources. In 2011, using a Supplemental Poverty Measure (SPM), the old age American poverty rate was measured as 15.9%.

== Assistance ==
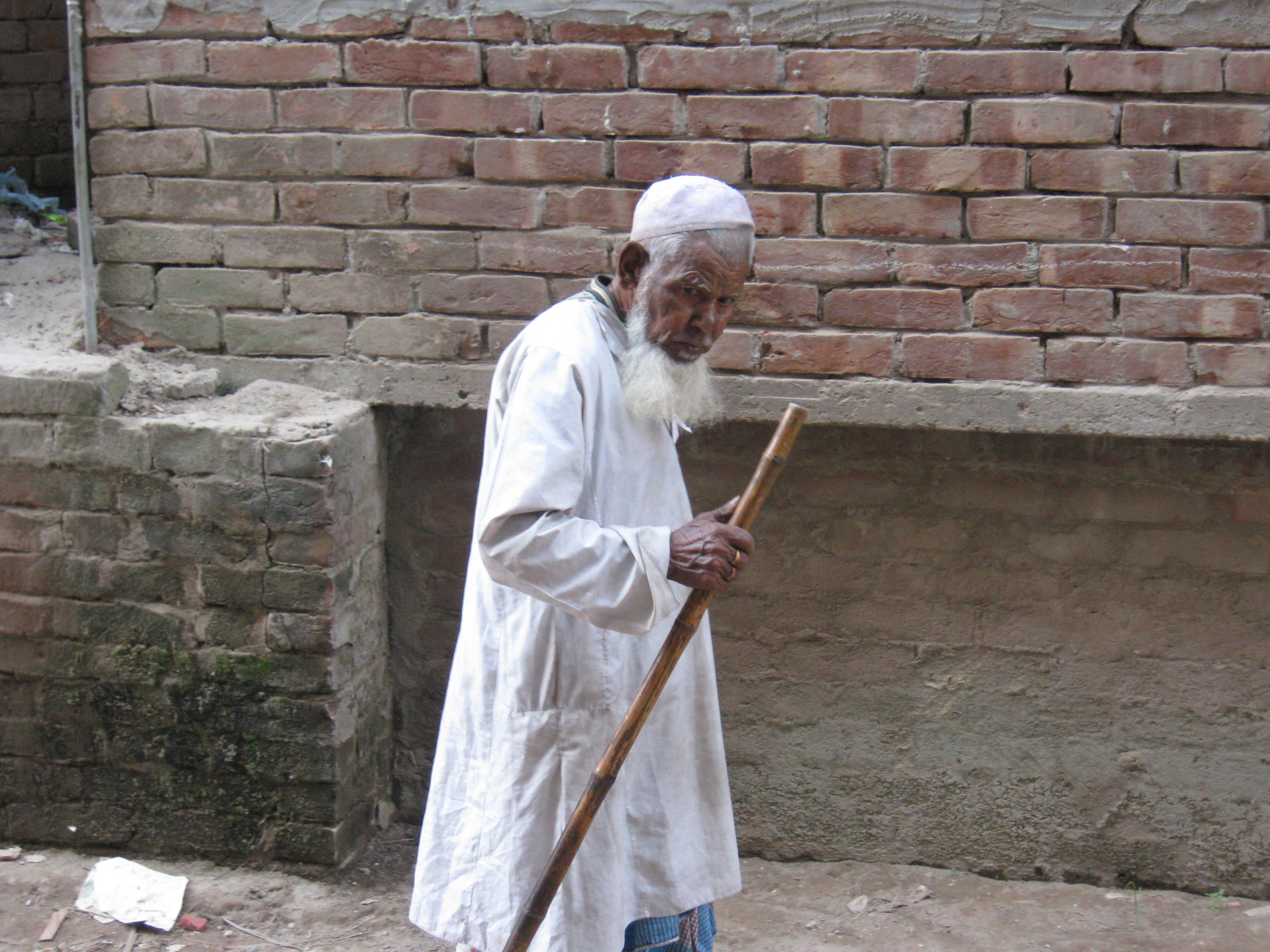
An elderly Bangladeshi man with a walking stick

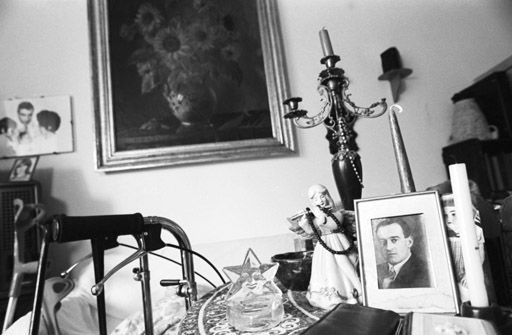
A walker in the apartment of a senior woman

In the United States in 2008, 11 million people aged 65+ lived alone: 5 million or 22% of ages 65–74, 4 million or 34% of ages 75–84, and 2 million or 41% of ages 85+. The 2007 gender breakdown for all people 65+ was men 19% and women 39%.

Many new assistive devices made especially for the home have enabled more old people to care for their own activities of daily living (ADL). Some examples of devices are a medical alert and safety system, shower seat (making it so the person does not get tired in the shower and fall), a bed cane (offering support to those with unsteadiness getting in and out of bed) and an ADL cuff (used with eating utensils for people with paralysis or hand weakness).

A Swedish study found that at age 76, 46% of the subjects used assistive devices. When they reached age 86, 69% used them. The subjects were ambivalent regarding the use of the assistive devices: as "enablers" or as "disablers". People who view assistive devices as enabling greater independence accept and use them, whereas those who see them as symbols of disability reject them. However, organizations like Love for the Elderly aim to combat such age-related prejudice by educating the public about the importance of appreciating growing older, while also providing services of kindness to elders in senior homes.

Even with assistive devices as of 2006, 8.5 million Americans needed personal assistance because of impaired basic activities of daily living required for personal care or impaired instrumental activities of daily living (IADL) required for independent living. Projections place this number at 21 million by 2030 when 40% of Americans over 70 will need assistance. There are many options for such long-term care to those who require it. There is home care in which a family member, volunteer, or trained professional will aid the person in need and help with daily activities. Another option is community services which can provide the person with transportation, meal plans, or activities in senior centers. A third option is assisted living where 24-hour round-the-clock supervision is given with aid in eating, bathing, dressing, etc. A final option is a nursing home which provides professional nursing care.

== Culture ==
In 2014, a documentary film called The Age of Love used humor and the poignant adventures of 30 seniors who attend a speed dating event for 70 to 90-year-olds and discover how the search for romance changes—or does not change—from childhood to old age.

=== Artistic depiction ===
Scholarly literature has emerged, especially in Britain, showing historical trends in the visual depiction of old age.

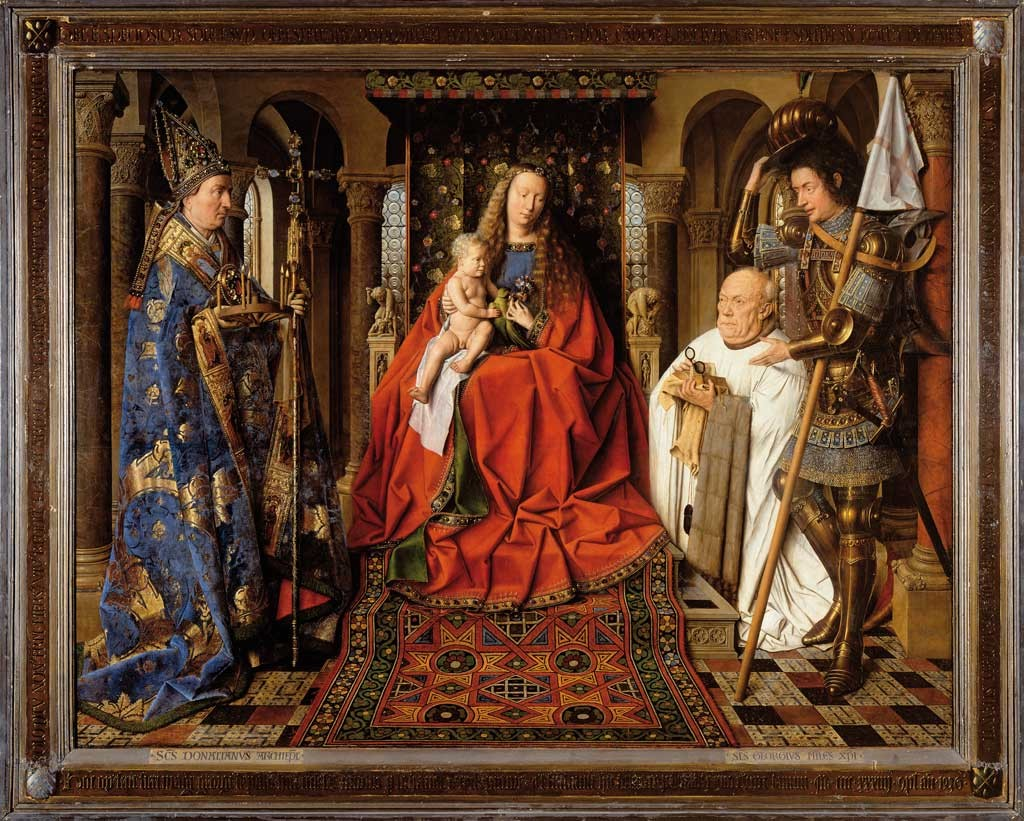
Jan van Eyck, Virgin and Child with Canon van der Paele, c. 1434–36

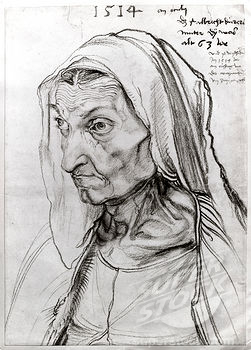
Albrecht Dürer, Portrait of the Artist's Mother at the Age of 63, 1514

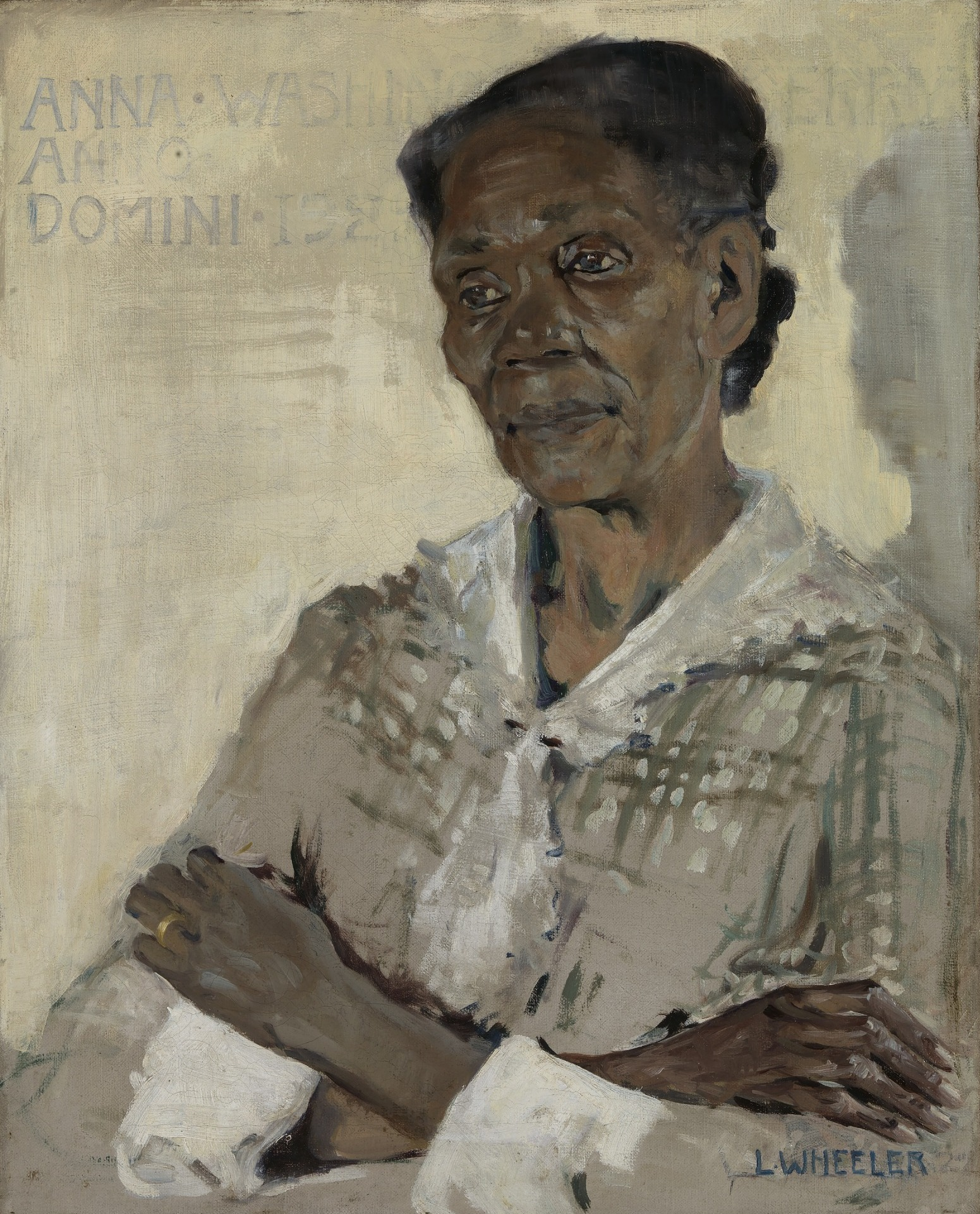
Laura Wheeler Waring, Anna Washington Derry, 1927

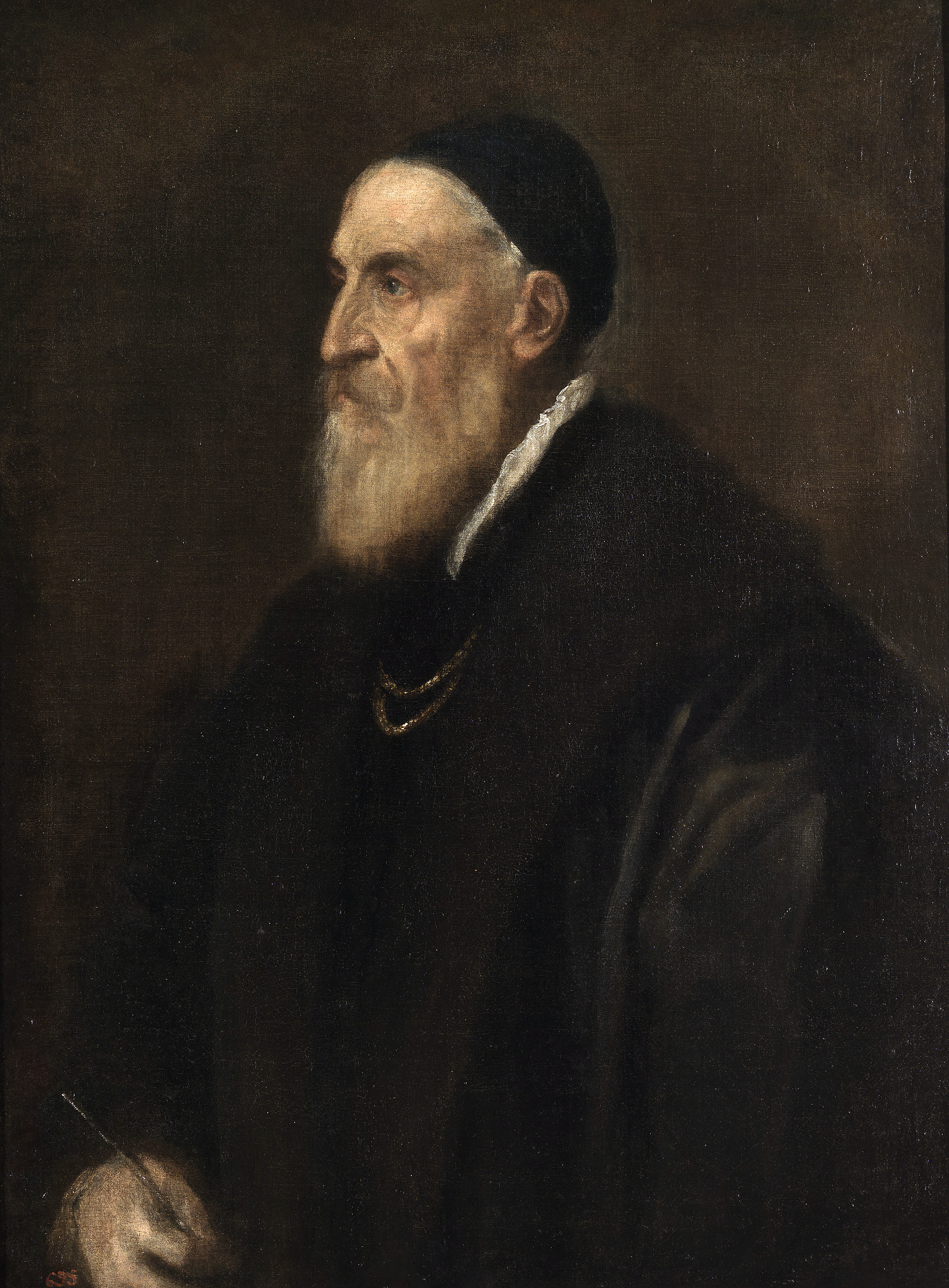
Titian, Self-Portrait, c. 1567

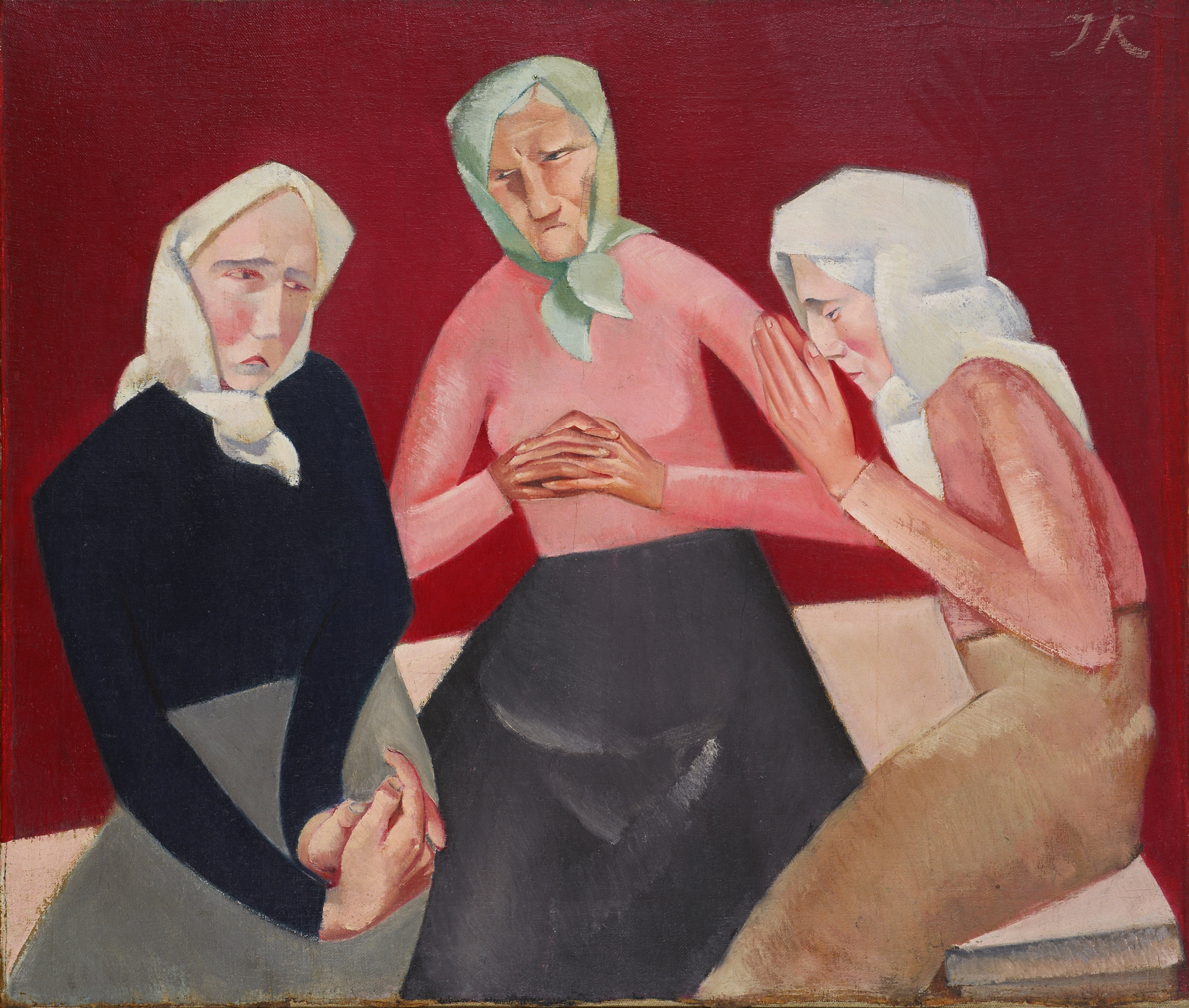
Jēkabs Kazaks,Three Old Ladies, 1916

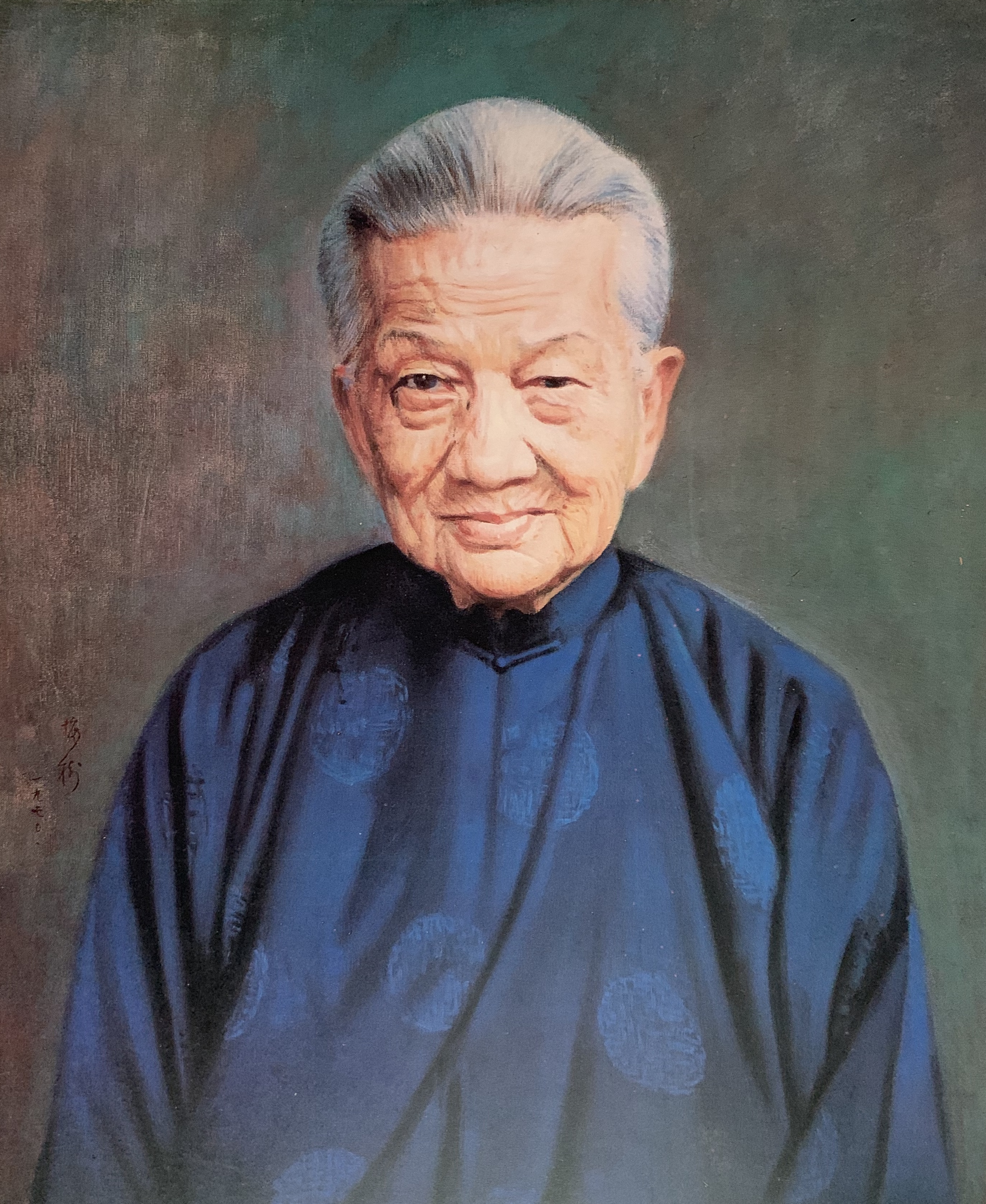
Li Mei-shu, Aged Mrs. Chen, 1970

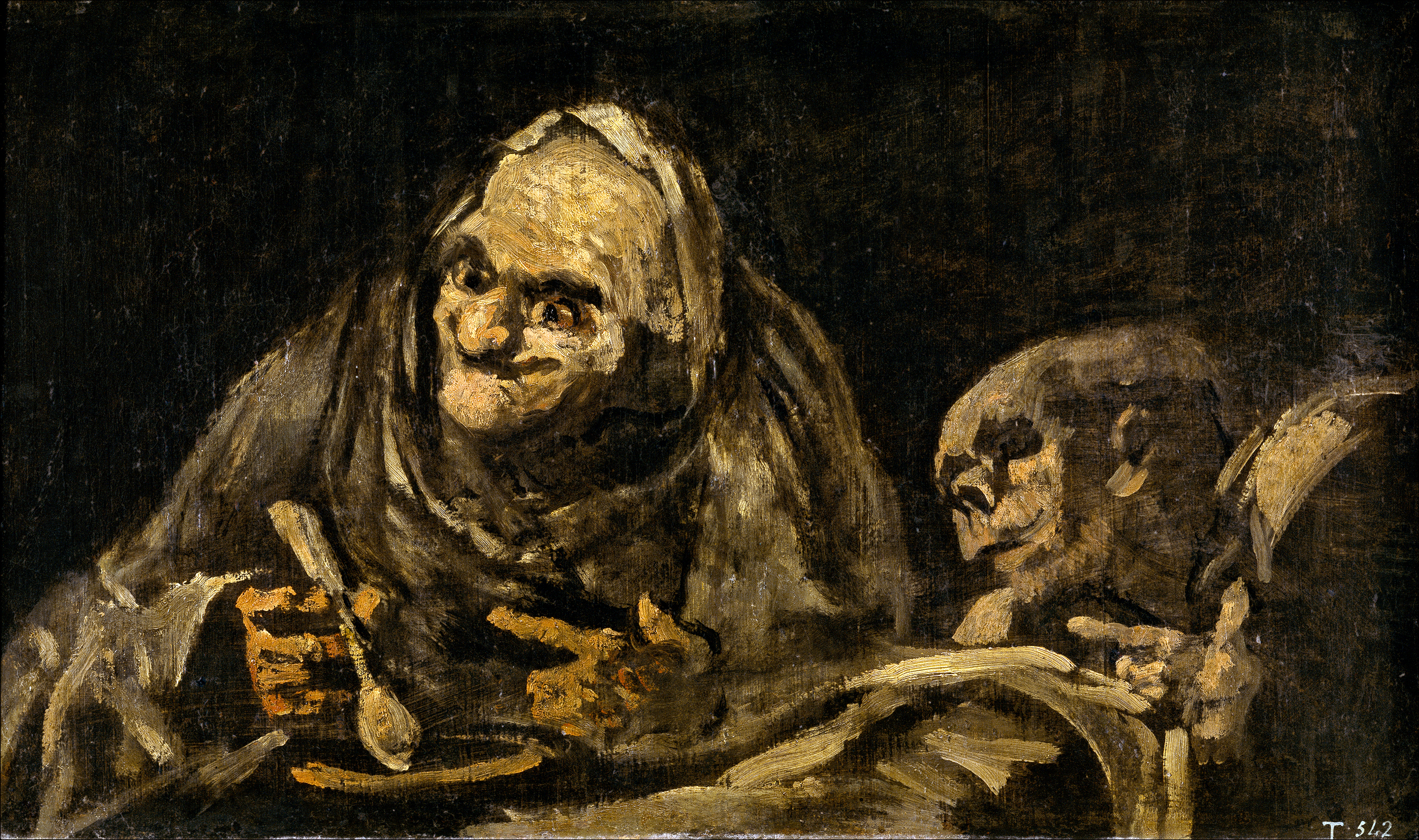
Francisco Goya, Two Old Ones Eating Soup, c. 1819–1823

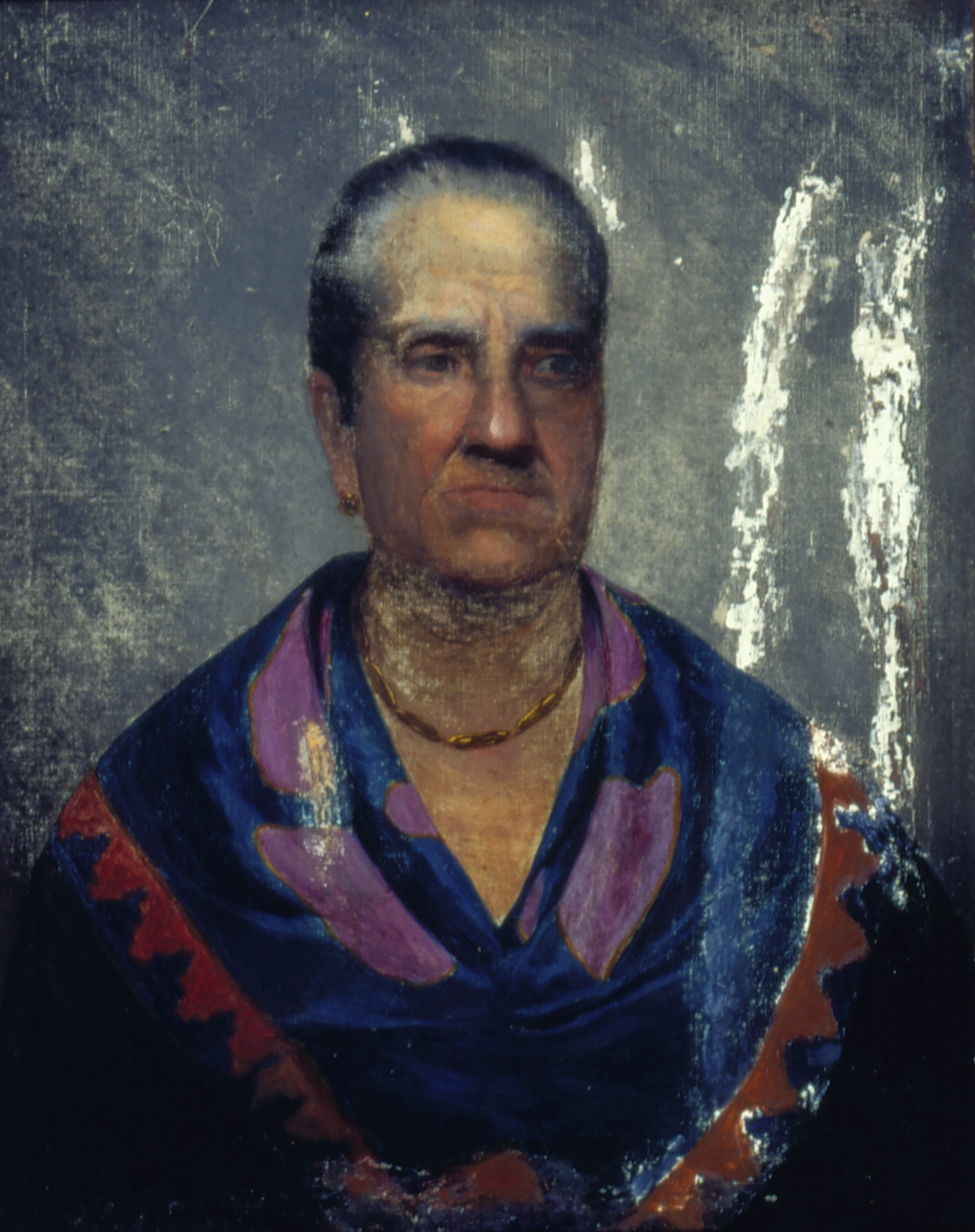
Almeida Júnior, Senhora Cubana, 1944

== See also ==
- Activist ageing
- Ageing
- Ageism
- Aging in dogs
- Aging in place
- Centenarian
- Elder abuse
- Elder rights
- Elder village
- Elderly care
- Food preferences in older adults and seniors
- Geriatric care management
- Gerontology
- Gerascophobia
- International Day of Older Persons
- List of the verified oldest people
- List of oldest people
- Loneliness in old age
- Pensioner
- Paternal age effect
- Respect for the Aged Day
- Retirement home
- Silver Alert
- Supercentenarian
- Successful ageing

Preceded by Middle age	Stages of human development Old age	Succeeded by Death
