= Party for Rejuvenation Research =

Single-issue political party in Germany

Party for Rejuvenation Research Partei für Verjüngungsforschung
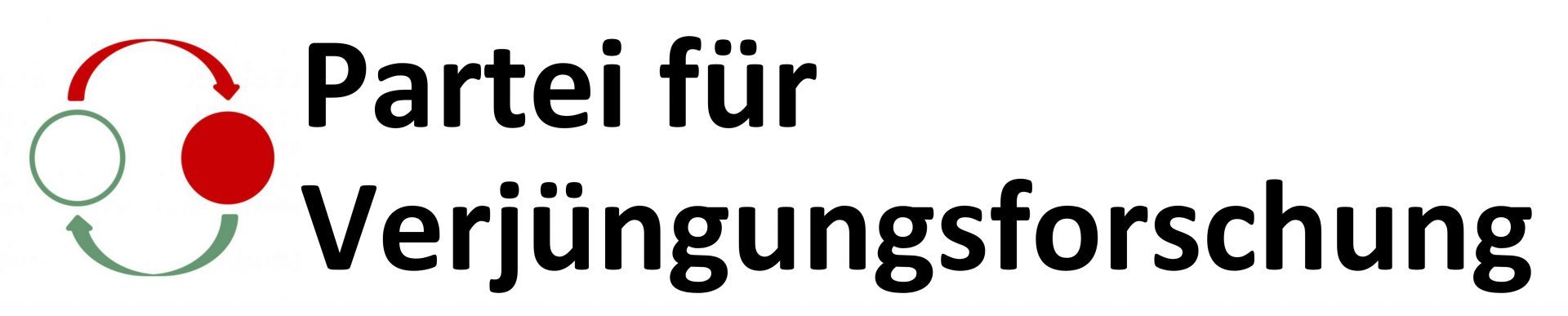
- Logo since 2024
- Leader: Felix Werth
- General Secretary: Moritz Pohl
- Vice-Leader: Nicolai Kilian, Karl-Friedrich Harter
- Federal Treasurer: Erik Krüger
- Founded: 2015
- Headquarters: Berlin
- Membership: 348
- Ideology: Single-issue politics
- Colours: Black; White; Green; Red
- Bundestag: 0 / 630
- State Parliaments: 0 / 1,855

Website
- verjuengungsforschung.de

The Party for Rejuvenation Research (German: Partei für Verjüngungsforschung), formerly the Party for Biomedical Rejuvenation Research (German: Partei für schulmedizinische Verjüngungsforschung) and originally the Party for Health Research (German: Partei für Gesundheitsforschung), is a single-issue political party in Germany that seeks to accelerate the development of medicine to reverse the aging process.

== Political positions ==
The Party for Rejuvenation Research is a single-issue political party in Germany founded in 2015 with the goal of accelerating the development of regenerative medicine against aging, enabling people to live indefinitely long healthy lives. According to the party, their purpose is to prevent the suffering caused by age-related disease and death. Besides that, the party also highlights the economic benefit of curing aging, as the costs for age-related illness and care would be eliminated.

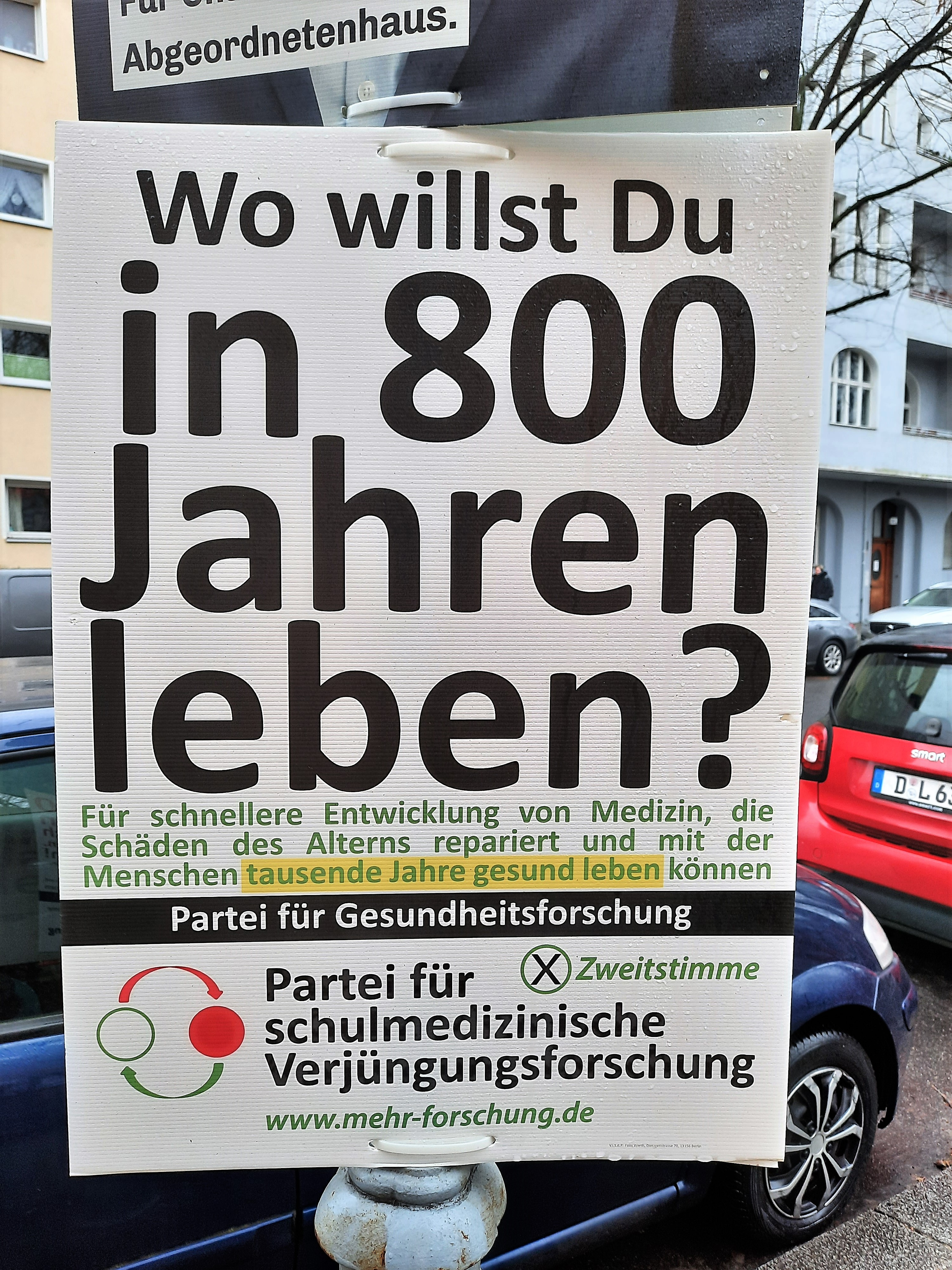
2023 election poster in Berlin reading: "Where do you want to live in 800 years?"

The party seeks to increase the number and size of pertinent research facilities, and to expand education and training of professionals in those fields. The party also strives to raise public interest in rejuvenation research in order to cause large established parties to focus more on this subject.

The party adopts a neutral position on subjects that do not immediately pertain to rejuvenation research.

== Organization ==
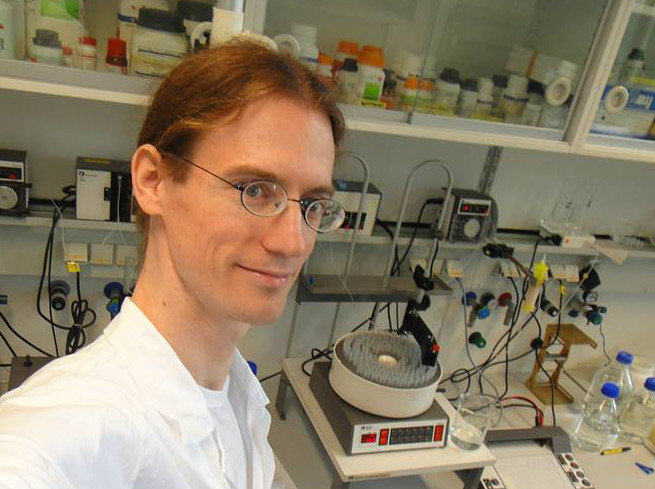
Party leader Felix Werth

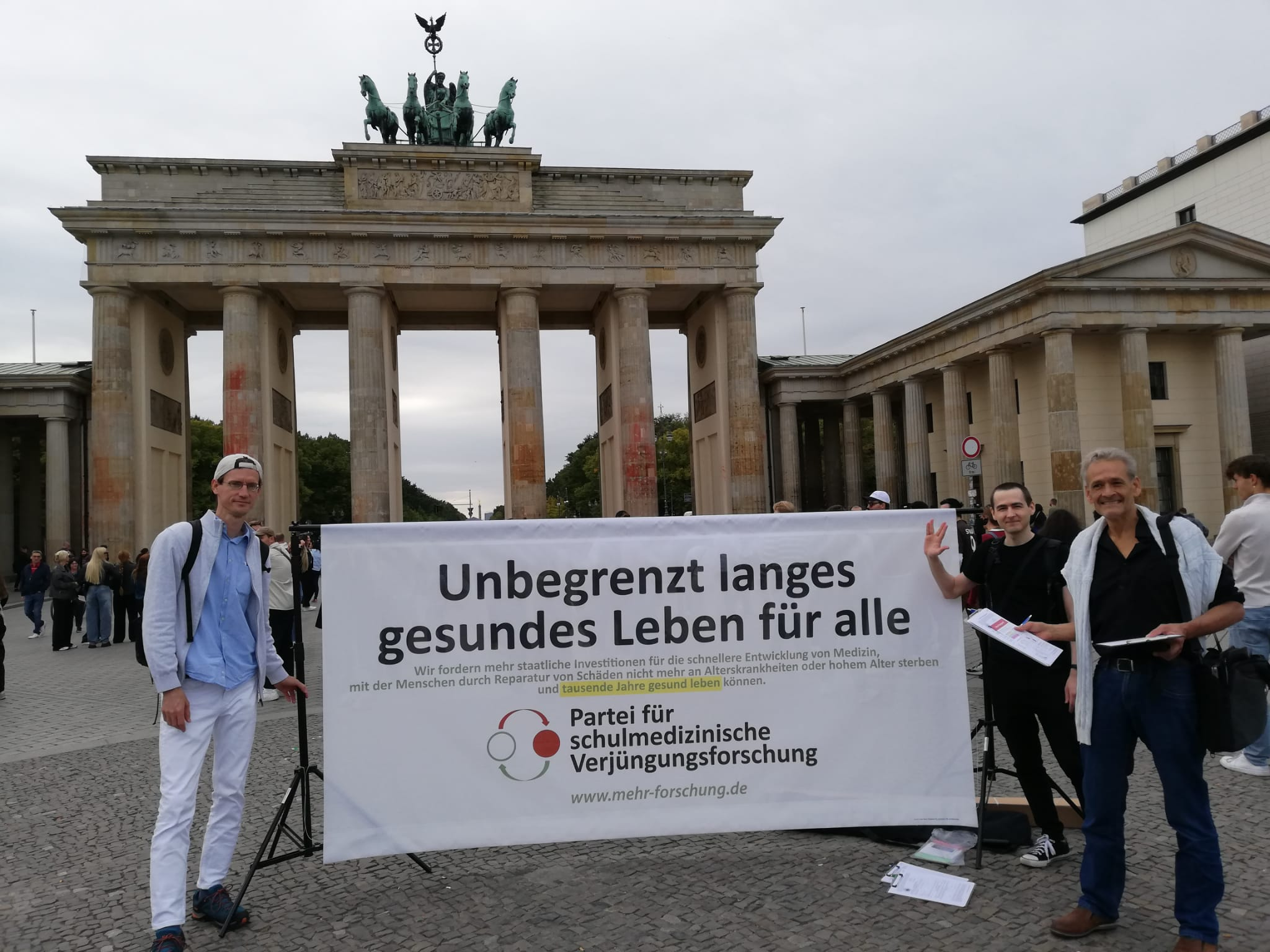
Party poster at the Brandenburg Gate on the occasion of the “International Longevity Day” in 2023

The incumbent party leader is biochemist Felix Werth from Berlin.

As of July 2022, the party has regional branches in all 16 German states.

== Renaming ==
The party has carried the name Party for Health Research since its founding in 2015, but changed its name to Party for Biomedical Rejuvenation Research on 27 November 2022.

On 11 October 2024, the party was renamed again to Party for Rejuvenation Research.

== Elections ==
As of 30 March 2021, the party has participated in eight state elections as well in the 2017 German federal election and the 2019 European Parliament election, achieving the following results:

- 2016 Berlin state election: 0.5%
- 2017 North Rhine-Westphalia state election: 0.1%
- 2017 German federal election: 0.1%
- 2018 Bavarian state election: 0.1%
- 2018 Hessian state election: 0.1%
- 2019 European Parliament election: 0.2%
- 2019 Saxony state election: 0.5%
- 2019 Thuringian state election: 0.5%
- 2020 Hamburg state election: 0.2%
- 2021 Baden-Württemberg state election: 0.0%; candidacy only in the electoral constituencies Stuttgart IV (0.4%) and Ulm (0.4%)
- 2021 German federal election: 0.1%
- 2021 Mecklenburg-Western Pomerania state election: 0.2%
- 2021 Berlin state election: 0.3%
- 2022 Saarland state election: 0.1%
- 2022 Schleswig-Holstein state election: 0.1%
- 2022 North Rhine-Westphalia state election: 0.1%
- 2025 German federal election: 0.00%

== Election results ==
=== European Parliament ===
Election	List leader	Votes	%	Seats	+/–	EP Group
2019	Felix Werth	70,869	0.19 (#23)	0 / 96	New	–
2024	Felix Werth	18,935	0.05 (#32)	0 / 96	0	–

== Literature ==
- Anne Küppers: Partei für Gesundheitsforschung (Gesundheitsforschung). In: Frank Decker, Viola Neu (publisher): Handbuch der deutschen Parteien. 3rd edition, Springer VS, Wiesbaden 2018, ISBN 978-3-658-17995-3, p. 440–441.

== See also ==
- List of political parties in Germany
- Aubrey de Grey
