= Michaela Bergman =

British social development advocate

- Born: 1962/1963; London, England
- Died: 2023
- Education: Queen's College, London; King's College London (LLB); London School of Economics (MSc)

Michaela Bergman (1962/1963–2023) was a British social development advocate. She was known for her work regarding gender equality at institutions such as the European Bank for Reconstruction and Development (EBRD) and the Asian Infrastructure Investment Bank (AIIB).

== Early life and education ==
Bergman was born in London. She attended Queen's College, London, and graduated with a law degree from King's College London in 1983. She later pursued a Master of Science in social anthropology at the London School of Economics (LSE) in 1995.

== Career ==
Bergman began her career at the Institute of Child Health at Great Ormond Street Hospital in London. She then studied Mandarin in Taiwan, returning to London in 1989 to work at HelpAge International. There, she developed programs such as meals on wheels and podiatry clinics for older adults in eastern Europe.

In 2001, Bergman became a senior democratisation officer with the Organization for Security and Co-operation in Europe (OSCE)'s mission to Bosnia and Herzegovina. She later worked as a consultant on social issues with the United Nations, the UK's Department for International Development (DfID), and the Asian Development Bank.

In 2005, Bergman joined the European Bank for Reconstruction and Development (EBRD). In 2012, she became the EBRD's chief social counsellor, where she led its first strategy for the promotion of gender equality.

In 2017, Bergman joined the Asian Infrastructure Investment Bank (AIIB) in Beijing as its principal social development specialist.

== Recognition ==
In 2014, she was one of the BBC's 100 Women and took part in a BBC-led event which "looked at the lives of women around the world to mark 100 years of feminism".

== Death ==
She died in 2023 of a cancer linked to a BRCA gene mutation, a condition common among the Ashkenazi Jewish community.
