= National Senior Citizens Day =

Annual United Nations observance for older people

- Observed by: United States Of America
- Date: 21 August
- Frequency: Annual

The National Senior Citizens Day (Note: "Citizens" is spelled without an apostrophe in the day's proclamation.) is celebrated on 21 August each year. The day is intended to increase awareness of the factors and issues that affect older adults, such as health deterioration and elder abuse. It is also a day to recognize and acknowledge the contributions of older people to society, like International Day of Older People celebrated on October 1.

The history of the National Senior Citizens Day dates back to 1988, when it was officially proclaimed by the President of the United States, Ronald Reagan. He had signed Proclamation 5847 on 19 August 1988 for the first National Senior Citizens Day on 21 August.

"For all they have achieved throughout their lives and for all that they continue to do, we owe our gratitude and sincere greetings to our senior citizens. We can show our gratitude and appreciation better by making sure our communities are good places. Age and maturity, places where older people can participate as much as possible and find the encouragement, acceptance, support and services they need to continue living a life of independence and dignity.

— Ronald Reagan said, in his presidential proclamation.

National Senior Citizens Day is an opportunity to celebrate and appreciate senior citizens for their services, accomplishments and dedication they have given in their lives.

== See also ==
- Elderly care
