= Ursula Lehr =

German academic, researcher, and politician (1930–2022)

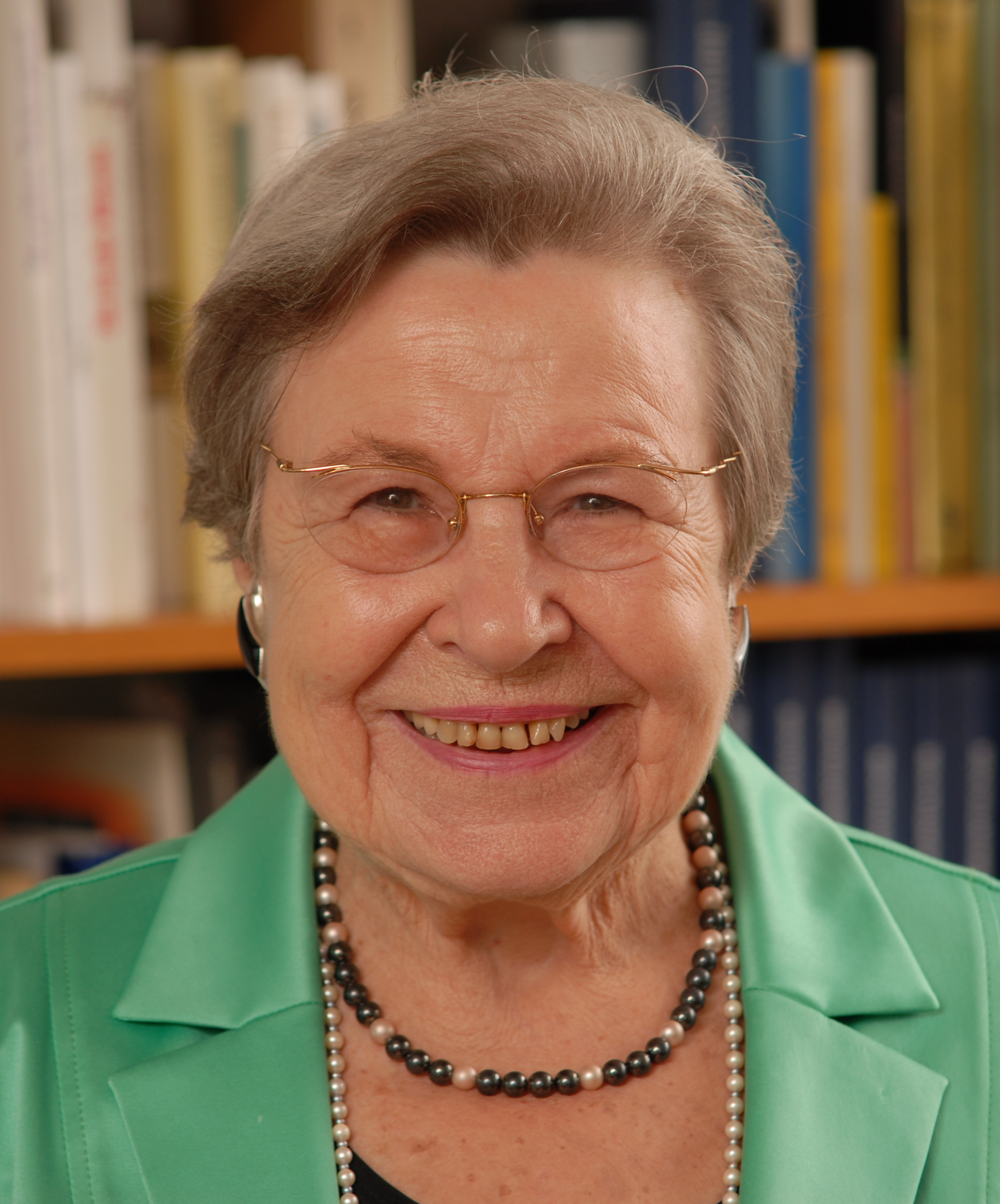
- Lehr in 2011

Federal Minister for Youth, Family, Women and Health
- In office 9 December 1988 – 18 January 1991
- Chancellor: Helmut Kohl
- Preceded by: Rita Suessmuth

Personal details
- Born: Ursula Maria Leipold; 5 June 1930 Frankfurt, Hesse-Nassau, Prussia, Germany
- Died: 25 April 2022 (aged 91) Bonn, North Rhine-Westphalia, Germany
- Party: Christian Democratic Union
- Education: University of Frankfurt/Main; University of Bonn
- Awards: Order of Merit of the Federal Republic of Germany; Order of Merit of Baden-Württemberg

Ursula Lehr (5 June 1930 – 25 April 2022), née Leipold, was a German academic, age researcher and politician. She was the first professor of gerontology in Germany, with a chair at the University of Heidelberg from 1986. She served as federal minister of youth, family, women and health from 1988 to 1991. She was a member of the Bundestag from 1990 to 1994. Returning to science, she founded the German centre for research on aging (DZFA) of the University of Heidelberg in 1995, and was head of the German National Association of Senior Citizens' Organizations (BAGSO) from 2009 to 2015.

== Life ==
=== Early life and education ===
Ursula Maria Leipold was born in Frankfurt on 5 June 1930; her father was a banker, and she grew up with two younger siblings. She obtained the Abitur at a gymnasium for girls in Offenbach am Main. She married Helmut Lehr that year at age 19; her husband worked for an Arbeitsgemeinschaft of the CDU/CSU. She began studies of German studies, art history and philosophy at the University of Frankfurt. When Bonn became capital of West Germany, her husband's workplace moved there, and she continued her studies at the University of Bonn in 1950, now focused on psychology and German studies. In 1954, she was promoted to the doctorate, with a dissertation "Beiträge zur Psychologie der Periodik im kindlichen Verhalten.", on psychological studies of children.

=== Academic career ===
She began her academic career in 1955 as a research assistant at the University of Bonn. In a project of the German Research Foundation, she researched the capability of elder workers to work ("Leistungsfähigkeit älterer Arbeitnehmer"). She was habilitated by the faculty of philosophy in 1968, writing "Die Frau im Beruf – eine psychologische Analyse der weiblichen Berufsrolle" about the psychology of working women. In 1970, she was appointed professor. She also led the department of developmental psychology. She was called to the University of Cologne in 1972, in the faculty of pedagogy and pedagogic psychology, where she was also director of the pedagogical seminar. That year, she wrote her seminal book, Psychologie des Alterns (Psychology of aging), based on the premise that aging is a process of lifelong learning and adaption. It made her a pioneer of gerontology.

She returned to Bonn in 1976, to the new faculty of developmental psychology. She was an advisor to Lothar Späth, then minister-president of Baden-Württemberg, who initiated that she was called to the first chair of gerontology in Germany, at the University of Heidelberg. The institute began teaching gerontology in 1987.

=== Political career ===
Lehr joined the Christian Democratic Union (CDU) in 1986. In 1988, Chancellor Helmut Kohl offered her the Federal Ministry of Family Affairs, Senior Citizens, Women and Youth, hoping that she would improve the situation of elderly citizens, based on her scientific research. In office, she was engaged in women's rights and in early education, and she recognized quite early the problems of an aging society. She resigned in December 1990 due to harsh criticism. She served in the Bundestag from 1990 to 1994.

=== Later years ===
After leaving politics, Lehr returned to her teaching post. In 1995, she was the founder of the German centre for research on aging (DZFA) of the University of Heidelberg, and headed it until 1998. She also served as the chair of the German society of gerontology and geriatrics from 1997 to 1998. She was elected the head of the German National Association of Senior Citizens' Organizations (BAGSO) in 2009, was reelected to the post in 2012 for three more years, and served as vice-president for the following period. She was afterwards honorary president of the BAGSO.

=== Private life ===
Lehr was married twice; both marriages ended with the death of her husband. She had two sons.

Lehr died in Bonn on 25 April 2022 at age 91.

== Awards ==
Lehr received the Order of Merit of the Federal Republic of Germany and the Order of Merit of Baden-Württemberg, among others. She held honorary doctorates of the University of Fribourg and the University of Vechta.

== Publications ==
- Psychologie des Alterns. Quelle und Meyer, Heidelberg 1972 (Wiebelsheim 2007), 11 editions. ISBN 978-3-494-01432-6.
- Die Rolle der Mutter in der Sozialisation des Kindes. Steinkopff, Darmstadt 1974. ISBN 3-7985-0414-8.
- Zur Situation der älter werdenden Frau. Bestandsaufnahme und Perspektiven bis zum Jahr 2000. Beck, München 1987. ISBN 3-406-32226-3.
