= German National Association of Senior Citizens' Organizations =

- German National Association of Senior Citizens' Organizations
- Bundesarbeitsgemeinschaft der Seniorenorganisationen
- Abbreviation: BAGSO
- Formation: 1989
- Type: Nonprofit
- Services: promotion of healthy ageing, digitalisation and education in older age and the care and participation of people with dementia
- Official language: German

The German National Association of Senior Citizens' Organizations (German: Bundesarbeitsgemeinschaft der Seniorenorganisationen or BAGSO) is an umbrella organization of about 120 civil society organizations, which together represent several million older people. BAGSO is a Nonprofit organization based in Bonn and it was founded in 1989.

== Chairpersons ==
- 1989 to 1996: Marieluise Kluge-Steudel
- 1996 to 2006: Roswitha Verhülsdonk
- 2006 to 2009: Walter Link
- 2009 to 2015: Ursula Lehr
- 2015 to 2021: Franz Müntefering
- since 2021: Regina Görner

== International Commitment ==
On an international level, BAGSO is committed to strengthening the rights of older people worldwide, advocating for a UN convention on the rights of older people. To this end, BAGSO participates in the debate on how to better protect the rights of older people worldwide, in particular in the Open-ended Working Group on Ageing of the United Nations.

At the European level, BAGSO is part of the European Economic and Social Committee (EESC) and is a member of AGE Platform Europe, the umbrella association of older people's organizations in Europe.

BAGSO’s international work is coordinated by its Secretariat for International Policy on Ageing.

== See also ==
- German Senior Citizens' Day
- United Nations Economic and Social Council
- Second World Assembly on Ageing
- Federal Ministry of Family Affairs, Senior Citizens, Women and Youth
