= German Senior Citizens' Day =

Nationwide event on the topic of aging in Germany

The German Senior Citizens' Day (German: Deutscher Seniorentag) is an annual conference for exchange, information and networking around ageing and later life in Germany. It is used by policymakers, civil society and the society at large to discuss current questions regarding older age. Senior citizens' political participation and their encouragement to discuss key social issues in a self-conscious manner is an important task, which is promoted and demonstrated by events like the senior citizens' days, as Chancellor Angela Merkel expressed in her speech at the Senior Citizens' Day 2012.

The Senior Citizens' Day is organised by the German National Association of Senior Citizens' Organizations (BAGSO) together with its 120 member organisations. The three-day event takes place every three years in another federal state. The patronage of the German Senior Citizens' Day is in rotation the federal chancellor or the federal president. The president of the Federal Republic of Germany, Frank-Walter Steinmeier, appealed in his opening speech at the German Senior’s Day in 2018 in Dortmund to put the situation in geriatric care on the political agenda.

The programme includes more than 150 individual events and an exhibition where organisations and companies present their work, including many products and services for people aged 50 and above. One of the outcome documents of the event is a declaration, passed by the member associations of BAGSO. Taking into consideration current challenges, it contains recommendations for decision-makers at all levels as well as individuals on how to improve the living conditions of older people in Germany. In 2021 the "Hannover Declaration" (German: Hannoversche Erklärung) was published.

In 2018, 14,200 guests visited the 12th Senior Citizens' Day taking place in Dortmund, North Rhine-Westphalia. The 13th German Senior Citizens' Day 2021 took place from November 24 to 26, 2021. Due to the ongoing COVID-19 pandemic, the three-day event was realised virtually.
