= HelpAge International =

International non-governmental organization

- Founded: 1983
- Type: Non-governmental organization
- Location: 90 countries
- Chair: Arun Maira
- Affiliations: International Disability and Development Consortium (IDDC)
- Website: www.helpage.org

HelpAge International is an international NGO that helps older people claim their rights, challenge discrimination, and overcome poverty, so that they can lead dignified, secure, active and healthy lives.

Five organisations from Canada, Colombia, Kenya, India and the United Kingdom set up HelpAge International in 1983 to provide a global network to support older people worldwide.

HelpAge International has an office in London. HelpAge Global Network now has over 170 members in 90 countries.

HelpAge works for and with older people by: lobbying governments to achieve policy change, undertaking research programmes, and via community projects on the ground. The organisation focuses on issues that affect older people worldwide, such as disaster risk reduction and climate change, rights, health, social protection, work, and COVID-19 vaccines.

HelpAge works with local partners to provide emergency relief, health care, and other support to older people affected by natural disasters and other humanitarian crises.

HelpAge International works to promote the development of a United Nations convention on the rights of older persons. The organisation engages in lobbying and advocacy efforts at the national and international level to raise awareness about the need for such a convention and to ensure that the rights and needs of older people are taken into account in the drafting process. Additionally, the organisation works with its members and partners to promote the inclusion of older people in the development of the convention and to provide training and capacity building to older people and their organisations. HelpAge International also conducts research and produces publications and other resources to support the development of the convention.
