= Love For Our Elders =

American nonprofit organization

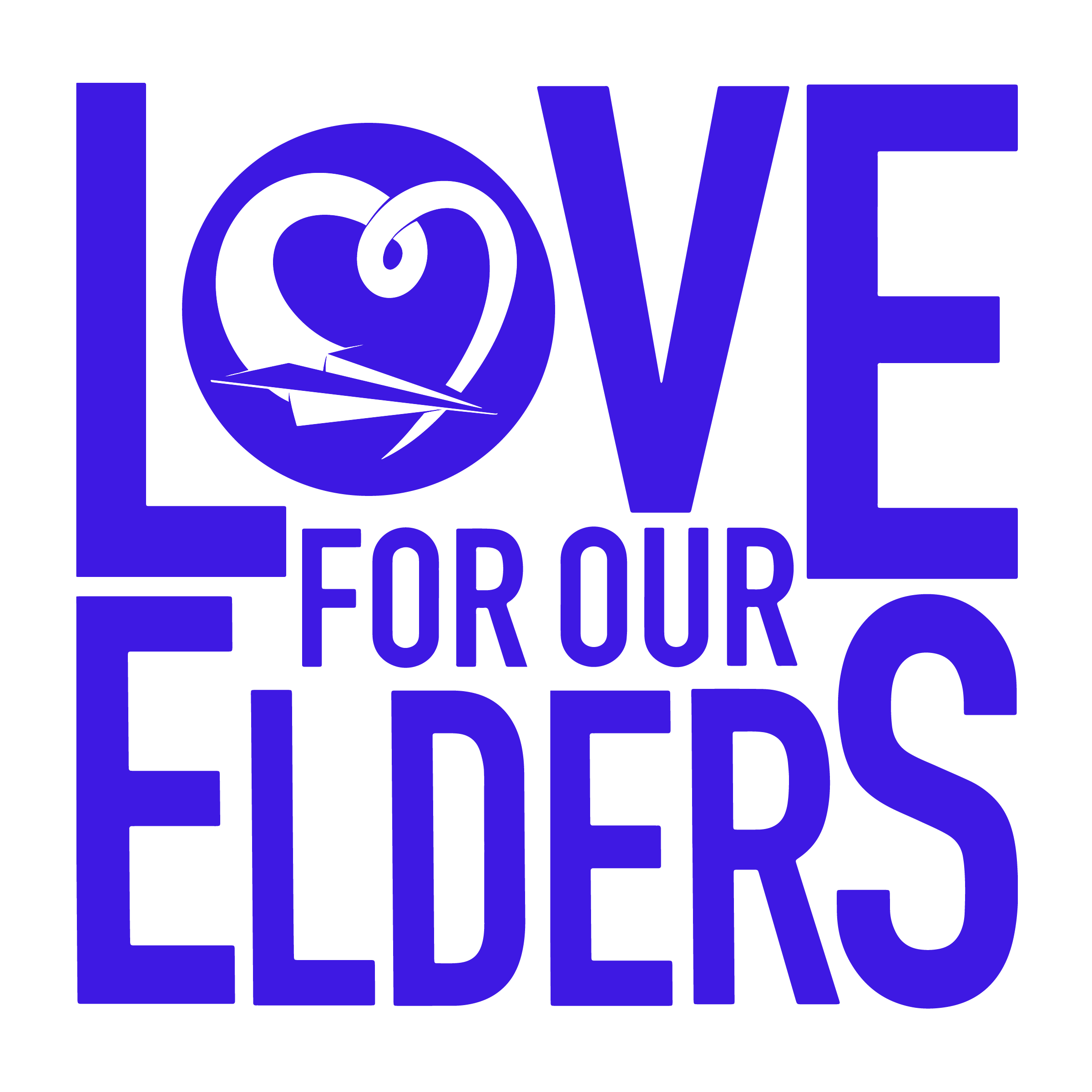
- Founded: December 2013
- Founder: Jacob Cramer
- Legal status: 501(c)(3)
- Purpose: Humanitarian/Activism
- Headquarters: Cleveland, Ohio
- Website: loveforourelders.org

Love For Our Elders (formerly Love for the Elderly) is a United States–based nonprofit organization that works to alleviate social isolation among older adults through volunteer‑driven letter writing and community engagement.

== History ==
In 2013, Jacob Cramer, a regular volunteer at a senior living community, noticed widespread loneliness among residents. Cramer initially wrote and distributed handwritten letters to residents, and the initiative expanded as others volunteered.

During the COVID-19 pandemic, the organization compiled stories from older adults and sent video messages to senior communities. On September 15, 2020, the organization changed its name to Love For Our Elders. A statement from the founder said, "We’ve come to realize that our organization’s name included language that contradicted the work we pour our hearts into every day." After the pandemic, the organization shifted from sending general letters to senior communities to delivering personalized letters directly to older adults experiencing social isolation.

By 2026, volunteers had facilitated the sending of more than one million handwritten letters worldwide.

== Activities ==
The organization coordinates a network of volunteers, including student-led chapters, who write and send letters to older adults.

The organization created National Letter to an Elder Day on February 26, an annual unofficial observance promoting writing a letter to any older person.

In 2024, Cramer published a picture book with the nonprofit titled Grandma's Letter Exchange, aimed at introducing young children to letter writing. In 2025, he appeared on the Kelly Clarkson Show for the "Rad Human" segment.
