= Convention on the Rights of Older Persons =

Treaty on moral principles for treating seniors

The Convention on the Rights of Older Persons (UNCROP) is a proposed United Nations convention. The focus of the treaty will be persons over 60 years of age, a growing demographic due to population aging.

== Content ==
Presently, there is no international legally binding instrument to protect the human rights of older persons. It is, however, been discussed since 2011 by "The Open-Ended Working Group on Ageing for the Purpose of Strengthening the Protection of the Human Rights of Older Persons" (mostly referred to as the Open-Ended Working Group on Ageing, OEWGA) which was established by United Nations General Assembly in 2010. The OEWGA has debated what the substantive content of a treaty may be. In the most recent session of OEWGA in April 2022, an increasing number of UN Member States took note of the gaps in the existing international human rights system. The fundamental rights affirmed by the proposed treaty would be extensions of those secured by other multilateral treaties, though with a focus on specific issues faced by older persons.

== Background ==
=== World Assembly on Ageing ===
In 1982, the Report of the World Assembly on Ageing (also known as "the International Plan on Ageing") was published, which represented the first international debate on the rights of older persons and presented a plan for their implementation. The Report sets out a number of underlying principles which are applicable to older persons, importantly the participating states reaffirmed "their belief that the fundamental and inalienable rights enshrined in the Universal Declaration of Human Rights apply fully and undiminished to the aging." The report acknowledged several sub-topics especially applicable to the rights of elderly persons, including health and nutrition, housing and environment, the family, social welfare, income and security and employment, and education. The report therefore gave policy recommendations to address these concerns, including to avoid imbalances in age groups in the public sector, and to give effort to fill longer life spans with a sense of purpose and accomplishment. Additionally, producing proactive policies aimed at healthier older populations and financial security for retirement were promoted. The significance of this report for the proposed convention is its use in determining the United Nations approach to ageing and its members states' internal policies.

=== United Nations Principles for Older Persons ===
The next move towards a convention for the rights of older persons, which was first proposed by Argentina in 1948, was the adoption of the United Nations Principles for Older Persons, in 1991. The Principles provided that older persons in society ought to have independence, the ability to participate in society, have access to care, be entitled to self-fulfilment and the full dignity of life among other rights. The Principles were adopted in October 1992 due to the adoption of the proclamation on aging in General Assembly Resolution 47/5, which contained the proclamation as an annex and giving some weight to the 1991 Principles. However, the implementation of these Principles received little oversight, as under international law United Nations General Assembly Resolutions are not automatically binding on parties. By adopting the Principles, the United Nations brought the rights of older persons to the same moral level as those of other bodies and set some targets towards their implementation, such as the 2001 deadline for meeting global targets on problems for ageing persons.

=== The Second World Assembly on Ageing ===
The Second World Assembly on Ageing saw the adoption of the 2002 Political Declaration and Madrid International Plan of Action on Ageing (MIPAA), which sought to outline a plan for "building a society for all ages." The Plan aims “to ensure that persons everywhere are able to age with security and dignity and to continue to participate in their societies as citizens with full rights”. It has three priority directions: older persons and development, advancing health and well-being into old age and ensuring enabling and supportive environments. The Plan seeks to achieve these aims by promoting the active participation of older persons in society in its member states. The contribution of the Plan towards an International Convention on the Rights of Older Persons can be seen in the placement of older people into the general context of international human rights law, establishing the groundwork for older persons to be seen as a protected group. It is the first UN document in which UN member states reaffirm their commitment “protect human rights and fundamental freedoms, including the right to development (…) [and] to eliminating all forms of discrimination, including age discrimination. The Plan is, however, no internationally legally binding instrument. The implementation of the recommendations of MIPAA is reviewed every 5 years, but there is no obligation for states to report on the implementation of MIPAA and its Regional Implementation Strategies at national level.

== The Open-Ended Working Group on Ageing for the Purpose of Strengthening the Protection of the Human Rights of Older Persons ==
In October 2010, the United Nations General Assembly adopted Resolution 65/182 which established the "Open‐Ended Working group on Ageing for the purpose of strengthening the Human Rights of Older Persons" as a follow-up to the Madrid Plan. The OEWGA has the mandate to consider the existing international framework of the human rights of older persons and identify possible gaps and how best to address them. The OEWGA forms the primary forum for debate as to the adoption of a multilateral human rights treaty regarding the human rights of older persons, as it focuses on the issues faced by older persons and recognizes gaps in the existing human rights framework. The OEWGA has had 12 sessions as of April 2022, and each of these sessions has aimed to clarify issues surrounding older persons' human rights and provide assistance to member states in their obligations under the Madrid Plan. Before each session the OEWGA invites member states, civil society organisations and national human rights institutions to contribute inputs to the session’s themes. In 2016, the Chair of the OEWGA listed 14 issues/focus areas, suggested by civil society, for discussion during the sessions (two per session). In 2017, it was further decided that in addition to substantive inputs on two themes per session, normative content for the development of the Convention should also be delivered.

In the first session, select member states acknowledged the difficult position of older person's rights under the traditional international framework, due to the lack of a specific convention. Therefore, the debate regarding the necessity of an international convention on the rights of older persons has been a feature of the OEWGA since its outset, which can be seen through the submissions of member states, international organisations, civil society organisations and national human rights institutes. Increasingly, high-ranking representatives of the United Nations, like the Secretary General himself and the High Commissioner for Human Rights have called for progress to close the gaps related to the human rights of older people in the international human rights framework. Special mandate holders of the OHCHR, including the Independent Expert for the full enjoyment of all human rights by older persons, have also repeatedly expressed their support for a UN Convention. An overview of the work of the OEWG-A up until April 2022 has been produced by BAGSO, the German National Association of Senior Citizens' Organisations and is available in English, French and German.

== Debate and criticism ==
Civil society and member states such as Argentina have advocated for a human rights convention since its beginnings, stating in their first submission that:

″There is no legally binding instrument to standardize and protect the rights of older persons... The argument is that the universal nature of international instruments should include the elderly. We all know that this does not happen because we live in an imperfect world. If the world were perfect we would not need any convention, and there is no discrimination. This is why the government of Argentina... support[s] the need for a convention to promote, protect and ensure the full enjoyment of all human rights and fundamental freedoms, ensuring its implementation through a binding instrument″ [sic]

Argentina's submission drew attention to the legislative significance of Human Rights Conventions, and that adopting such a convention for older persons would be in the best interests of the Madrid Plan. Over the years, vast evidence has been brought to the fore confirming gaps in the international human rights system as it relates to the human rights of older persons, as recognised by the High Commissioner for Human Rights in her 2022 report. In addition to the 2012 Analytical Outcome Paper on the normative standards in international law in relation to older persons submitted by OHCHR to the third working session of the Open-Ended Working Group on Ageing in August 2012 and an update of this study, prepared in 2021, other UN agencies, special mandate holders of the OHCHR, national human rights institutions and civil society organisations have found that the current international human rights framework does not sufficiently protect older people’s rights.

In addition to inputs submitted to the OEWGA and statements made during the sessions of the OEWGA, civil society organisations and national human rights institutions continue their advocacy work in the intersessional period. In 2021/22, for instance, over 300 NGOs and national human rights institutions have signed an Open Letter to the OEWGA suggesting concrete steps towards the fulfilment of the mandate of the OEWGA.

Over the years, the positioning of some member states changed, so that now they recognise that there are gaps in the international human rights framework, e.g. Austria and Germany. Some previously hesitant or silent member states now join the call for a UN Convention.

A significant gap in normative standards of older persons rights has been noted by the Office of the High Commissioner of Human Rights Committee on the Rights of Persons with Disabilities, which has stated: "the establishment of a binding international convention on the rights of older persons would create a legal framework that defined their rights." A similar position was taken by HelpAge International, which submitted a substantial report on age discrimination to the first session of the OEWGA, and concluded that a single instrument was needed to amalgamate the principles of older person's rights into one convention. As a result, the notion of a treaty has received support as it would set normative standards of human rights for older persons, in order to supplement the Madrid Plan, though it was not universally supported. Non-Government organisations such as HelpAge International, GAROP and others have repeatedly referenced a need for "universal prohibition of discrimination in old age in a human rights instrument [that] would provide a definitive, universal position that age discrimination is morally and legally unacceptable."

The Independent Expert on the full enjoyment of all human rights by older persons, a mandate currently held by Dr Claudia Mahler (Austria), consistently draws attention to human rights violations against older people and the need to adopt a Convention, for instance, in her report on ageism and age discrimination. She concludes this report in saying, “To address this gap in international and regional human rights law, age as a ground of discrimination must be explicitly recognized, including in a comprehensive binding legal instrument on the human rights of older persons.“

The main criticism of a new convention has come from states who have argued that drafting a new convention would be resource intensive, noting that the international human rights framework is already under-resourced. These states argued for a strengthening of existing mechanisms such as the International Covenant on Economic, Social and Cultural Rights and the International Covenant on Civil and Political Rights as an alternative. This view has been advocated by the United States, which has argued that a new convention would not add anything to the existing protections under international conventions already in existence. At the 12th session in 2022, however, the United States have been less vocal in its opposition and supported a proposal made by Argentina establishing a course of action for the OEWGA to fulfil its mandate.

== Future of the convention ==
The most recent development is a proposal made by Argentina during the 12th session of the OEWGA. Argentina invited like-minded member states to join an informal cross-regional core group which would work during the intersessional period. Aim of the group would be the preparation of a draft decision to be submitted for consideration of the OEWGA in 2023 and discuss possible gaps in the international human rights system for older persons. The draft decision would suggest the establishment of a formal intersessional working group with the aim to prepare and present a draft text with the main gaps in the international human rights system, as a basis for further negotiations.

At the same time the UN Human Rights Council in Geneva has made substantial advancements for the human rights of older persons. In its 48th session in October 2021, it adopted its first substantive resolution to advance older persons’ human rights and to fight ageism and age discrimination. In this resolution, the Human Rights Council requests the UN High Commissioner for Human Rights to present a report on international legal standards and obligations in relation to older persons’ human rights in advance of the 49th session of the HRC in 2022. The High Commissioner concludes her report in saying, “the current international framework provides fragmented and inconsistent coverage of the human rights of older persons in law and practice and that there is a need to move expeditiously towards developing and adopting a coherent, comprehensive and integrated human rights framework on older persons, while further integrating older persons’ concerns into the work of existing mechanisms.“ Also pursuant to resolution 48/3 of the Human Rights Council, a multi-stakeholder meeting to discuss the High Commissioner’s report will be held in 2022.

== See also ==
- International human rights law
- International Covenant on Civil and Political Rights
- International Covenant on Economic, Social and Cultural Rights
- International Day of Older Persons
- United Nations
