= International Day of Older Persons =

United Nations day

International Day of Older People
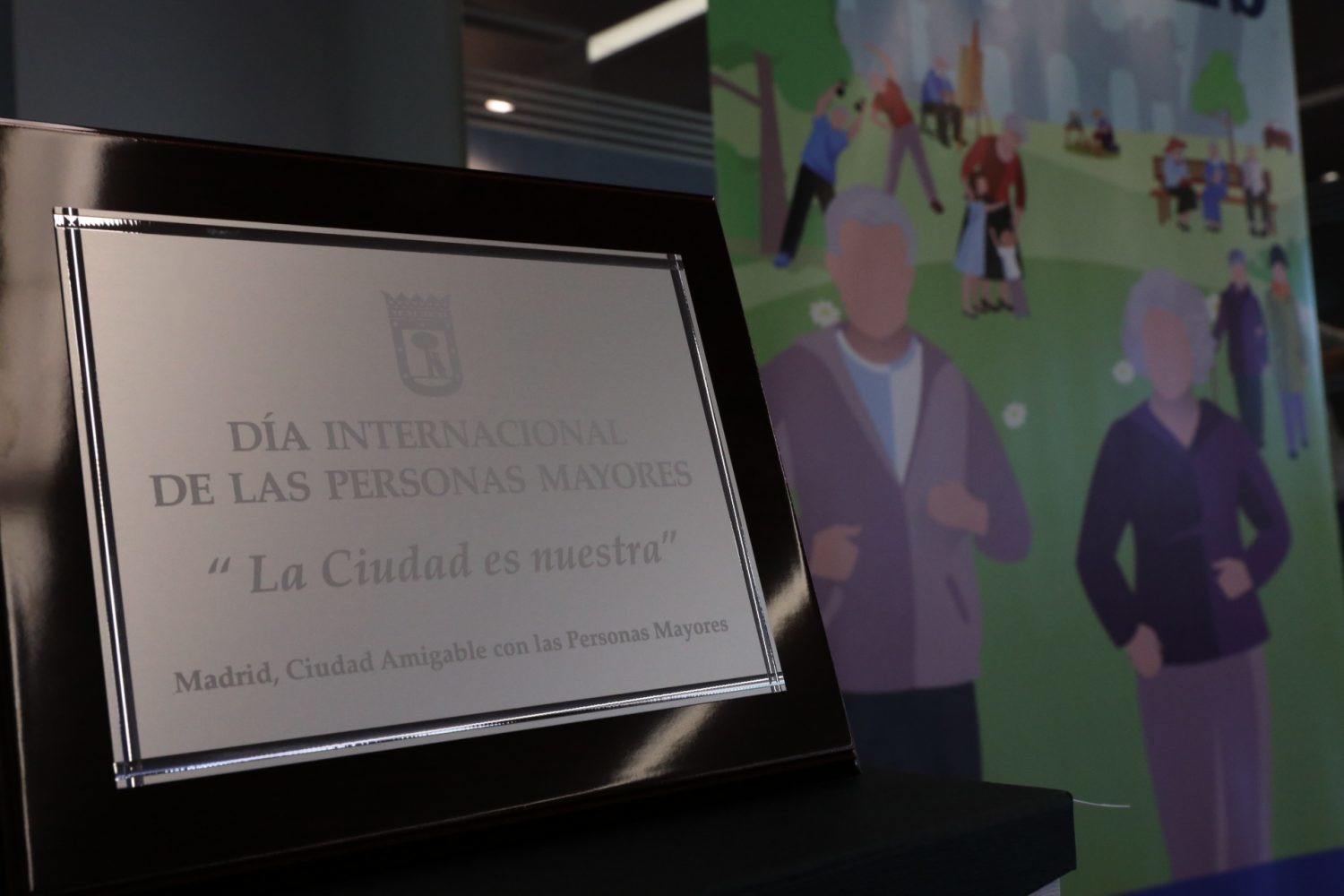
- Plaque in Madrid, Spain, celebrating the International Day of Older People
- Observed by: All UN member states
- Date: October 1
- Next time: 1 October 2027
- Frequency: Annual

The International Day of Older People is observed on October 1 each year.

On December 14, 1990, the United Nations General Assembly voted to establish October 1 as the International Day of the Elderly as recorded in Resolution 45/106. The holiday was observed for the first time on October 1, 1991.

The observance is a focus of ageing organizations and the United Nations Programme on Ageing.

== Annual themes ==
- 1998 & 2000: Towards A Society for All Ages.
- 2004: Older Persons in an Intergenerational Society.
- 2005: Ageing in the New Millennium.
- 2006: Improving the Quality of Life for Older Persons: Advancing UN Global Strategies.
- 2007: Addressing the Challenges and Opportunities of Ageing.
- 2008: Rights of Older Persons.
- 2009: Celebrating the 10th Anniversary of the International Year of Older Persons: Towards a Society for All Ages.
- 2010: Older Persons and the Achievement of the MDGs.
- 2011: The Growing Opportunities & Challenges of Global Ageing.
- 2012: Longevity: Shaping the Future.
- 2013: The Future We Want: What Older Persons are Saying.
- 2014: Leaving No One Behind: Promoting a Society for All.
- 2015: Sustainability and Age Inclusiveness in the Urban Environment.
- 2016: Take a Stand Against Ageism.
- 2017: Stepping into the Future: Tapping the Talents, Contributions and Participation of Older Persons in Society.
- 2018: Celebrating Older Human Rights Champions.
- 2019: The Journey to Age Equality.
- 2020: Pandemics: Do They Change How We Address Age and Ageing?
- 2021: Digital Equity for All Ages.
- 2022: Resilience of Older Persons in a Changing World.
- 2023: Fulfilling the Promises of the Universal Declaration of Human Rights for Older Persons: Across Generations.
- 2024: Ageing with Dignity: The Importance of Strengthening Care and Support Systems for Older Persons Worldwide.
- 2025: Older Persons Driving Local and Global Action: Our Aspirations, Our Well-Being and Our Rights.
- 2026: The Age of Longevity: Rethinking Systems for Longer Lives

== Perception ==
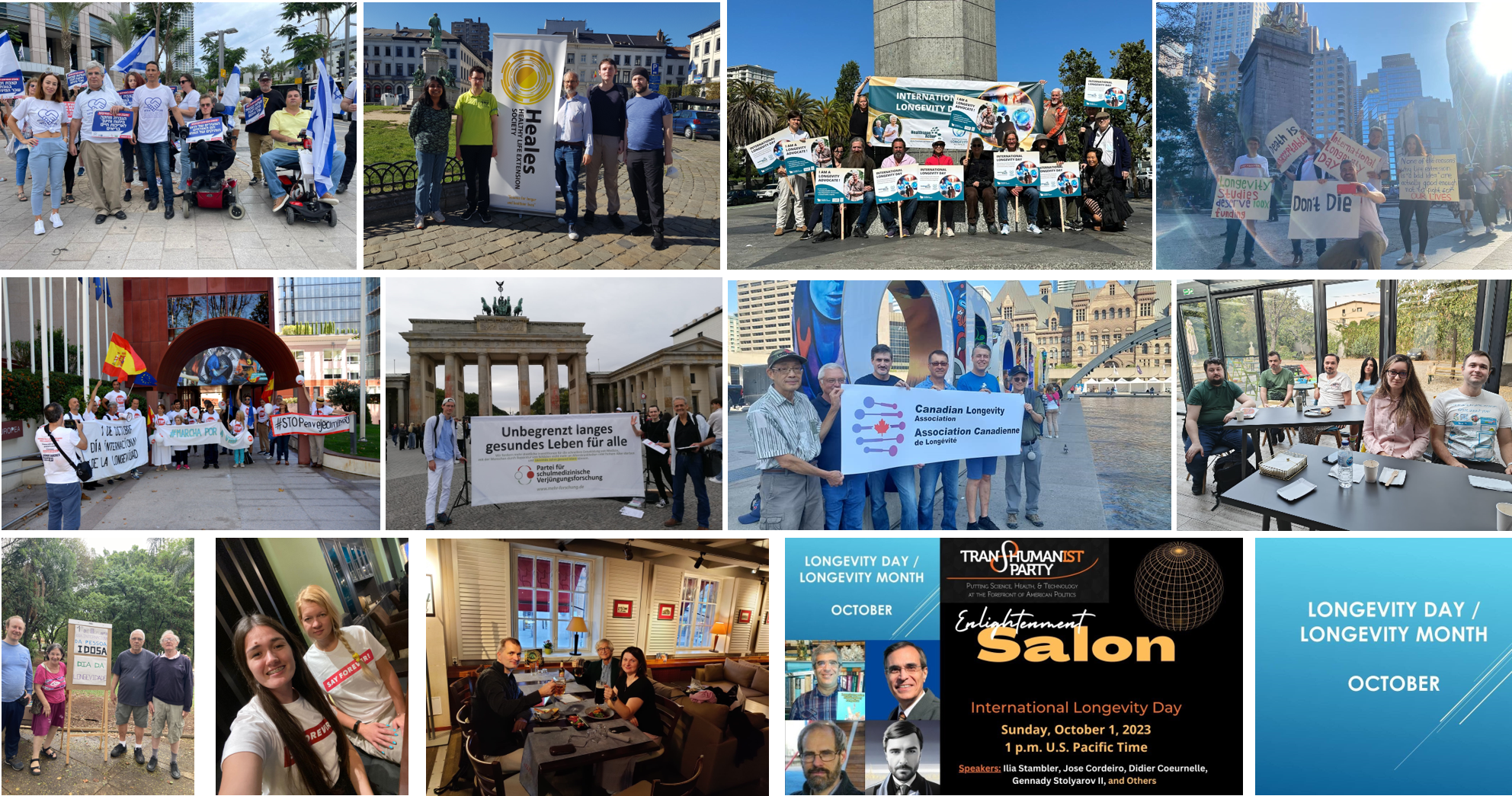
Series of events dedicated to the Longevity Day in various countries in 2023

There is an initiative to celebrate October 1 as the International Longevity Day in order to draw attention to aging as a medical challenge that requires, first of all, biomedical solution.

== See also ==
- Aging-associated diseases
- Ageism
- Convention on the Rights of Older Persons
- Elderly care
- Geriatrics
- International observances
- Respect for the Aged Day
- World Senior Citizen's Day
