= Bucknor (surname) =

Bucknor is a surname. Notable people with the surname include:

- C. B. Bucknor (born 1962), Jamaican baseball umpire
- Funke Bucknor-Obruthe (born 1976), Nigerian businessman and lawyer
- Jermaine Bucknor (born 1983), Canadian basketball player
- Kofi Bucknor (1953–2017), Ghanaian actor
- Kofoworola Bucknor (born 1939), Nigerian politician
- Matt Bucknor (born 1985), Canadian football player
- Richard Bucknor (born 1966), Jamaican hurdler
- Segun Bucknor (1946–2017), Nigerian musician
- Steve Bucknor (born 1946), Jamaican cricket umpire
- Tosyn Bucknor (1981–2018), Nigerian actress
