= Buckner (surname) =

Buckner is a surname. Notable people with the surname include:

- Bill Buckner (1949–2019), American baseball first baseman and outfielder
- Billy Buckner (born 1983), American baseball pitcher
- Brentson Buckner, former National Football League player
- Charles Buckner, (c. 1735–1811) admiral in the British Royal Navy
- Dave Buckner, drummer of Papa Roach
- DeForest Buckner (born 1994), American football player
- Derek Buckner, 21st-century New York painter
- George Washington Buckner (1855–1943), American physician and diplomat
- Jack Buckner, British track athlete
- John Buckner (bishop), LL.D. (1734–1824), Bishop of Chichester, England
- Lena Northern Buckner (1875–1939), American social worker
- M. M. Buckner, science-fiction author
- Milt Buckner, (10 July 1915 – 27 July 1977), American jazz pianist and organist
- Mordecai Buckner (c. 1735–1787), American Continental Army officer
- Randy Buckner, American neuroscientist
- Richard Buckner (1812–1883), English portraitist
- Richard Buckner, American singer-songwriter
- Robert Buckner (1906–1989), American writer and film producer
- Simon Bolivar Buckner, Confederate general during the American Civil War
- Simon Bolivar Buckner Jr. (1886–1945), American general during World War II
- Susan Buckner (1952–2024), American actress
- Thomas Buckner (born 1941), New York baritone
- Tim Bückner (born 1983), German politician
- William Buckner (1605–1657), Archdeacon of Salisbury, England
- William Buckner (?-1700), Member of the Irish Parliament for Dungarvan
