= Bucknor =

Bucknor may refer to:

== People ==
- Bucknor (surname)

== Places ==
Jamaica

- Bucknors Bay, an alternate name of Rio Nuevo Bay in Jamaica, at the outlet of the Rio Nuevo.

== See also ==
- Buckner (disambiguation)
