= William Buckner =

William Buckner may refer to

- William Quinn Buckner (born 1954), American former basketball player and coach
- Bill Buckner (1949–2019), American Major League Baseball first baseman
- Billy Buckner (born 1983), American Major League Baseball pitcher
- William Buckner (Irish MP) (?–1700), Irish politician, for Dungarvan
- William Buckner (priest) (1605–1657), English Anglican priest

== See also ==
- Buckner (disambiguation)#People
