= Omotade Alalade =

Nigerian activist

- Born: Omotade Sadare Alalade; Lagos, Nigeria
- Citizenship: Nigeria
- Occupations: Business woman, Social entrepreneur
- Years active: 2011–present
- Notable work: Beibei Haven Foundation
- Children: 2

Omotade Alalade (born c. 1985) is a Nigerian social entrepreneur and infertility expert. She is the founder and executive director of Beibei Haven Foundation, a nongovernmental organization that provides fertility support to women and couples. In 2016, she was listed as one of the BBC's 100 most influential women.

== Early life and education ==
Omotade was born as Omotade Sadare in Marina, Lagos state, Nigeria. She attended primary and secondary school in Lagos and studied for her tertiary education at Lagos State University.

== Career ==
As a result of personal experiences and traumatic life struggles Alalade went through with infertility, pregnancy, miscarriages and baby losses, she created the not-for-profit organization Beibei Haven Fertility Foundation. The foundation provides support for women and couples trying to conceive. The foundation also provides grants and support to families dealing with the loss of a pregnancy or infertility.

== Personal life ==
Omotade married Funmilade Alalade on 15 October 2011. According to Omotade, after she got married, she found out that she and her husband were both carriers of sickle cell anemia. This meant that they could have children who would have sickle cell anemia. The couple had many failed attempts to conceived through IVF, which were very traumatic. In November 2018, while sharing her testimony, she wrote via her Instagram profile, "After spending more than NGN11 million on IVF treatments my husband and I finally complete our family with a set of twins."

== Awards and recognition ==
- BBC 100 Women of the Year, 2016.
- Her Network Woman of the Year 2017.

== See also ==
- Funke Bucknor-Obruthe
- Funmi Iyanda
