= Giovanni Battista Cassevari =

Italian painter (1789–1876)

Giovanni Battista Cassevari (4 March 1789 – 11 June 1876) was an Italian painter in the neoclassical style.

== Biography ==
He was born in Genoa, Republic of Genoa, but his family moved to Livorno then Florence. As a boy, he attended the Academy of Fine Arts in Florence and studied under Pietro Benvenuti. He took part in the wars of 1813–14 under the Napoleonic armies, and was present at the battle at Paris. Afterward, he returned to Turin and Genoa, and in 1824 went to Florence and Rome. The next year, he married the artist Enrichetta Muschi there.

He gained acclaim as an excellent painter of miniature portraits. In Rome, he befriended leaders of the Neoclassical trends: Camuccini, Thordwalsen, Tenerani, d'Azeglio, Monti, Bassi, and Missirini.

Returning to Florence, he was patronized by English travelers to the city. The portraits in oil afterwards executed by him there and later in England are painted in the style of the Italian and Dutch masters. Richard Buckner and Crispini were among his pupils. His son Raffaele Cassevari was a prominent engineer and architect.

Cassevari painted a Madonna and Child for the church at Frosini. An engraving depicting Maria Teresa, Queen of Sardinia, is found in the Royal Collections of England.
