= Clement Hue =

British physician

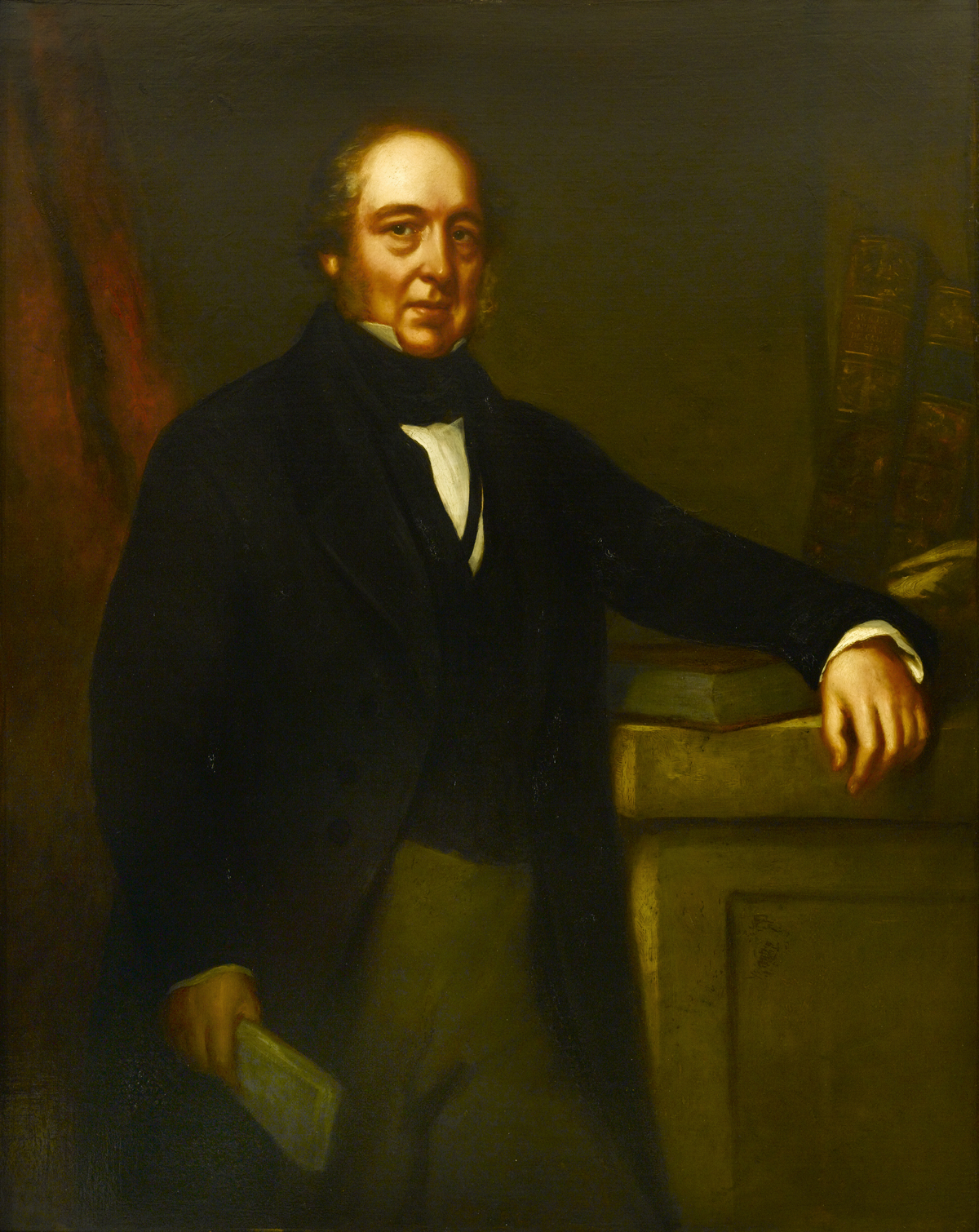
- Portrait by Richard Buckner, now in the collection of the Foundling Museum
- Born: c. 1779; Jersey, Channel Islands
- Died: 23 June 1861 (aged 82); St Giles, London
- Occupation: Physician

Clement Hue FRCP (1779 – 23 June 1861) was a British physician.

== Early life and education ==
Clement Hue was baptised at St Helier, Jersey on 12 May 1779, the son of Jean Hue and his wife Anne Dolbel. He was educated at John Roysse's Free School in Abingdon, (now Abingdon School). He later studied at Pembroke College, Oxford where he was a scholar and fellow and gained a D.Med.

== Career ==
He was physician to St Bartholomew's Hospital, Christ's Hospital, and to the Foundling Hospital from 1815–1837 and Vice President of the latter from 1847–1861 and M.I. Chapel of Foundling Hospital. He was a fellow and Registrar of the Royal College of Physicians from 1815–1824. and served as one of the RCP's Commissioners for Madhouses.

He gave the Harveian Oration in 1829.

== Family ==
He married Lucy Berkeley at Writtle, Essex on 5 December 1811. Their sons, Rev. Clement Berkeley Hue (1812 - 1893) and barrister Corbet Hue (1817 - 1904) were baptised respectively in 1812 and 1818 at St Pancras Old Church, London.

He died at 9 Bedford Square, London on 23 June 1861 aged 82 and was buried at the Foundling Hospital Chapel beside his wife Lucy (1783 - 1851).

== See also ==
- List of Old Abingdonians
