= Derek Buckner =

American painter

Derek Buckner, an American realist painter based in New York City, studied at the Art Institute of Chicago and has exhibited in New York City, East Hampton, and Todo Santos, Mexico. His father, Walker Buckner, is an important realist painter in Boston. Buckner is a nephew of new-music pioneer Thomas Buckner and of children's advocate Elizabeth Buckner.

As a Brooklyn-based artist, Derek Buckner draws inspiration from the beauty within the seemingly banal settings of suburban houses and intersecting freeways. These scenes are not meant to depict particular areas of the United States but to serve as archetypal representations of American suburban sprawl. It is not only the artist's expressive, elemental brushwork that depicts vital images of the contemporary American landscape, but also his choice of subjects, which emphasize the disquiet of suburban life. Buckner states:

".... I am attracted to American productivity-- its fecundity and its excess in the twenty-first century. It is also by seeing beyond our preconceived notions of place that I find splendor—whether it be tract housing glowing in the evening sun or the intertwining of concrete freeways in the heat of the day."

Derek Buckner grew up in Brooklyn, New York. He went on to study at Vassar College and received his B.F.A. from The School of the Art Institute of Chicago. He has exhibited in New York, Chicago, Italy, Mexico, East Hampton, and Santa Fe. His work is in numerous private and corporate collections in this country and abroad. A show at the George Billis Gallery in New York was reviewed favorably in The New Yorker and in The New York Sun, as well as in other publications. He has also received reviews in The New York Times and in the LA Times and was selected by Charlotta Kotik of the Brooklyn Museum for a juried exhibition of young painters.
