= Buckner =

Buckner may refer to:

== People ==
- Buckner H. Payne (1799-1889), American clergyman, publisher, and racist pamphleteer
- Buckner Thruston (1763–1845), U.S. Senator and judge from Kentucky
- Buckner (surname)

== Music ==
- Buckner & Garcia was an American musical duo consisting of Jerry Buckner and Gary Garcia

== Places ==
=== Japan ===
- Buckner Bay, a former name for Nakagusuku Bay on Okinawa
- Fort Buckner, a U.S. Army base on Okinawa

=== United States ===
- Buckner, Arkansas
- Buckner, Kentucky
- Buckner, Illinois
- Buckner, Missouri
- Buckner, Texas
- Buckner Mountain in Washington

== See also ==
- Bruckner (disambiguation)
