= Modern music =

Modern music may refer to:

== Albums ==
- Modern Music (Brad Mehldau and Kevin Hays album), 2010
- Modern Music (Be-Bop Deluxe album), 1976

== General music ==
- 20th-century music
- 20th-century classical music
- 21st-century classical music
- Contemporary classical music
- Modernism (music)
- Modern jazz
- Modern rock
- Popular music

== Other uses ==
- Modern Music (Australian record label), of bands such as The Tenants
- Modern Music (German record label), affiliated with Noise Records
- Modern Music (magazine), an American magazine published by Minna Lederman

== See also ==
- Modern Records, an American label active from the 1940s to 1960s
- Modern Records (1980), an American label active from 1980 to 1999
- New music (disambiguation)
