= New music =

New music may refer to:

== Musical styles and movements ==
Pre-20th century

- Ars nova, musical style in 14th-century France and the Low Countries
- Le nuove musiche, collection of monody by Giulio Caccini
- New German School, music style in late 19th-century Germany

20th–21st century

- Neue Musik, collective term for many different currents of composed, Central European influenced music from about 1910 to the present
- New-age music, a genre of music intended to create inspiration, relaxation and optimism
- New wave music, late 1970s and the 1980s with ties to mid-1970s punk rock
- New musick, an early term for post-punk, sometimes referred to as a distinct style, and also the name of a series of 1977 articles and editorials by Sounds magazine
- New music (Japanese genre), a Japanese pop music style from the 1970s
- New music, British 1980s pop music and cultural phenomenon in the US tied to the Second British Invasion
- New Romantic, a pop culture movement in the UK in the early 1980s
- New rave music
- Contemporary classical music, mid-1970s or 1945 to late 2010s

== Other ==
- New Musik, an English synthpop band
- New Music America, festival held throughout the 1980s
- New music, a poetic movement of the second half of the 5th century BC Dithyramb#History
- The NewMusic, a weekly television news magazine in Canada
- New Music Friday, international coordination for new music releases

== See also ==
- Modern music (disambiguation)
