= Richard Buckner (artist) =

English portrait painter (1812–1883)

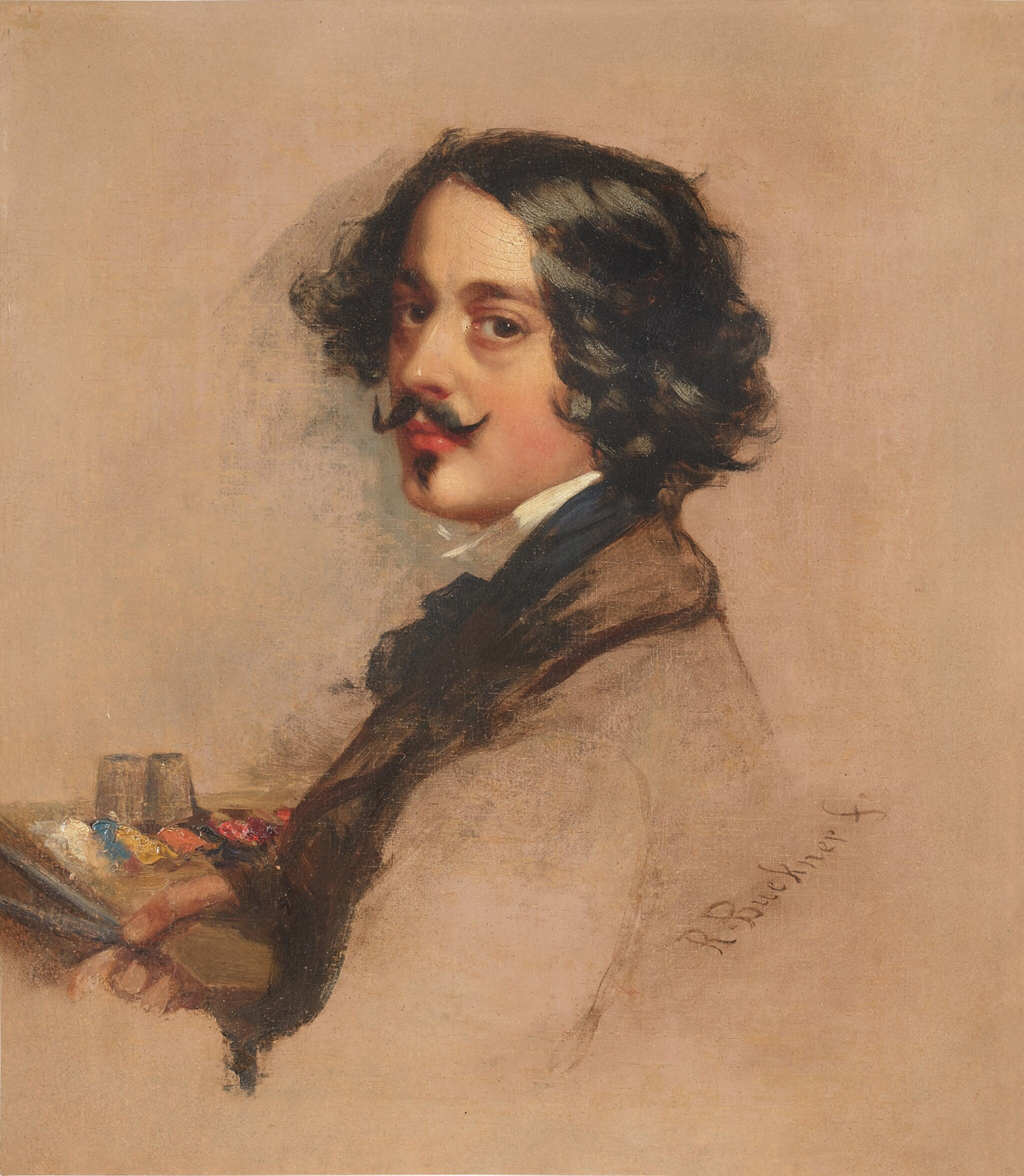
- Self-portrait of Richard Buckner
- Born: 25 October 1812; Woolwich, London, England
- Died: 12 August 1883 (aged 70); 2 Cleveland Row, St James, London
- Resting place: Brompton Cemetery, London
- Occupation: Portrait painter
- Parent(s): Richard Buckner and Mary Marsh Pierce

Richard Buckner (1812–1883) of Cleveland Row in St James's, London was an English painter best known for his prolific portraiture, particularly of Victorian society ladies (1840–1877).

== Early life ==
Richard Buckner was born in Woolwich in 1812, son of Lieutenant-Colonel Richard Buckner (1772–1837) and Mary Marsh Pierce (ca. 1778 – 1852). (Note: Colonel Buckner also served as Deputy Lieutenant of Sussex and was a son of Admiral Charles Buckner) In 1812, Colonel Buckner was on assignment at the Woolwich arsenal with the Royal Regiment of Artillery, but the main family home was Whyke House, Rumboldswhyke, Chichester where Buckner was raised.

Buckner showed an interest in art growing up, establishing his own painting studio at home where he experimented with limning. In 1831, Buckner was granted a commission in the British Army with the 60th Regiment of Foot, which was achieved by purchase the following year. (Note: It is uncertain whether Buckner ever served his army commission) In 1837, his father died and by 1840, Buckner had left the Army and had moved to Rome, where he studied painting under Giovanni Battista Cassevari.

== Career ==
Buckner set up his own studios in Rome facing Bernini’s Triton fountain and in London at Cleveland Row, opposite St James's Palace. During the sixteen years that he alternated between working in Rome and London, Buckner became friends with other expatriates in Rome like John Gibson, Penry Williams and the young Frederick Leighton, who later painted his portrait in The Death of Brunelleschi, 1852. When in Rome, Buckner painted Italian figurative subjects, the best of which were exhibited at the British Institution and when in England, he painted commissioned portraits, which were exhibited at the Royal Academy of Arts and the Society of British Artists. (Note: In 1861 to 1863, Buckner worked between France and London, but for the most part, he was based in London for the remainder of his career after 1862.)

Buckner first exhibited his work in 1840, showing in total around one hundred and sixty works of art over the next thirty-seven years. His best executed commissions were exhibited at the Royal Academy from 1842 and then every year thereafter from 1846 to 1877. The Royal Academy hung seventy-seven of Buckner's paintings, almost all portraits. (Note: seven were of Italian subjects) Thirty-two of his paintings paintings were also exhibited at the British Institution, all of them Italian figures, and a further forty-four paintings at the Royal Society of British Artists. (Note: Buckner also exhibited three paintings at the Grosvenor Gallery and another three at the Scottish National Gallery.) As little as 16% of his work was publicly exhibited, most of which was not for sale because they were commissioned works, but they still provided Buckner with visibility for future commissions and for publishers to establish his potential for mass reproductions of his work. (Note: Artists could earn large sums from selling the reproduction rights of their paintings to print publishers and Buckner's work attracted leading engravers such as Mote) That same visibility attracted the patronage of many important and wealthy clients including Queen Victoria, the Prince of Wales, and the Duke of Hamilton. The popularity of Buckner's particular style of portraiture evidently had mass appeal, although dismissed by some contemporary art critics as commercial art.

=== A Popular artist ===
Buckner's commercial success was facilitated by the same great art institutions that refused to admit him as a member, despite his being nominated for each. Many of the reviews of the time offered both high praise (Note: "shows careful study and brilliant execution"; "an excellent as well as eminently graceful work") and none. (Note: "Mr Buckner’s portraits have, as usual, much in common with the coloured lithographs on French plum-boxes"; "Mr Buckner’s barley-sugar monuments to simpering aristocracy…") The more expansive critiques pointed to Buckner's work as being "too sentimental" or just too large, (Note: “it is . . . rather a study of costume than anything else — a purpose certainly unworthy of development on so large a scale”) and for using "unnaturally vivid colours", the same criticisms levelled at the Pre-Raphaelites from the same institutions expressing similar reservations about membership. The Victorian art elite accused him of selling out to fashion and commercialisation. (Note: Criticising Buckner for being guided by his bank balance, one critic wrote "Many painters have been lead away from nature and true art by high patronage",) Bad reviews did little to dent Buckner's popularity, despite being described as both "cheap" and tawdry. The prices he commanded were not cheap however. (Note: Buckner's commission book includes a financial summary from 1842–3 to 1874–5 with fees totalling £67,249. In 1875, he was commissioned to execute a painting at a price of 500 guineas. Two years later, he stopped painting altogether)

== Legacy ==
Buckner stopped painting in 1877 and appears to have moved from his studio at 3A Cleveland Row to lodging next door at No.2 in the house of a Mr. William Woodward. (Note: the Westminster rate books catalogue show that Buckner paid rates every year for 3 Cleveland Row from 1862 to 1877 inclusive) Following Buckner's death in 1883, a society columnist wrote:

"Of late years one had seen but little of his work in exhibitions or of the painter in society, where at one time he was often beheld, a dainty jaunty little gentleman, much be-ringed and be-ringletted, and with a sweet smile for everybody"

Buckner's commission book lists 989 works over his professional career from 1840 to 1877, with a small number of commissions not executed. His portraits hung in royal and stately homes alongside Holbeins and Gainsboroughs, where some still hang today, (Note: e.g. Windsor Castle, Osborne House, Woburn Abbey, the Birmingham Art Gallery, Harewood House, the Foundling Hospital, County Hall, Maidstone and Castle Leslie in Ireland) including National Trust properties, as well as the National Portrait Gallery, London, the Victoria and Albert Museum, (Note: Portrait of a boy and Portrait of a Boy Chorister of the Chapel Royal) and the British Museum. His work continues to attract the interest of art critics and public alike.

== Gallery ==
Only five of the illustrations in this gallery are known to have been exhibited.

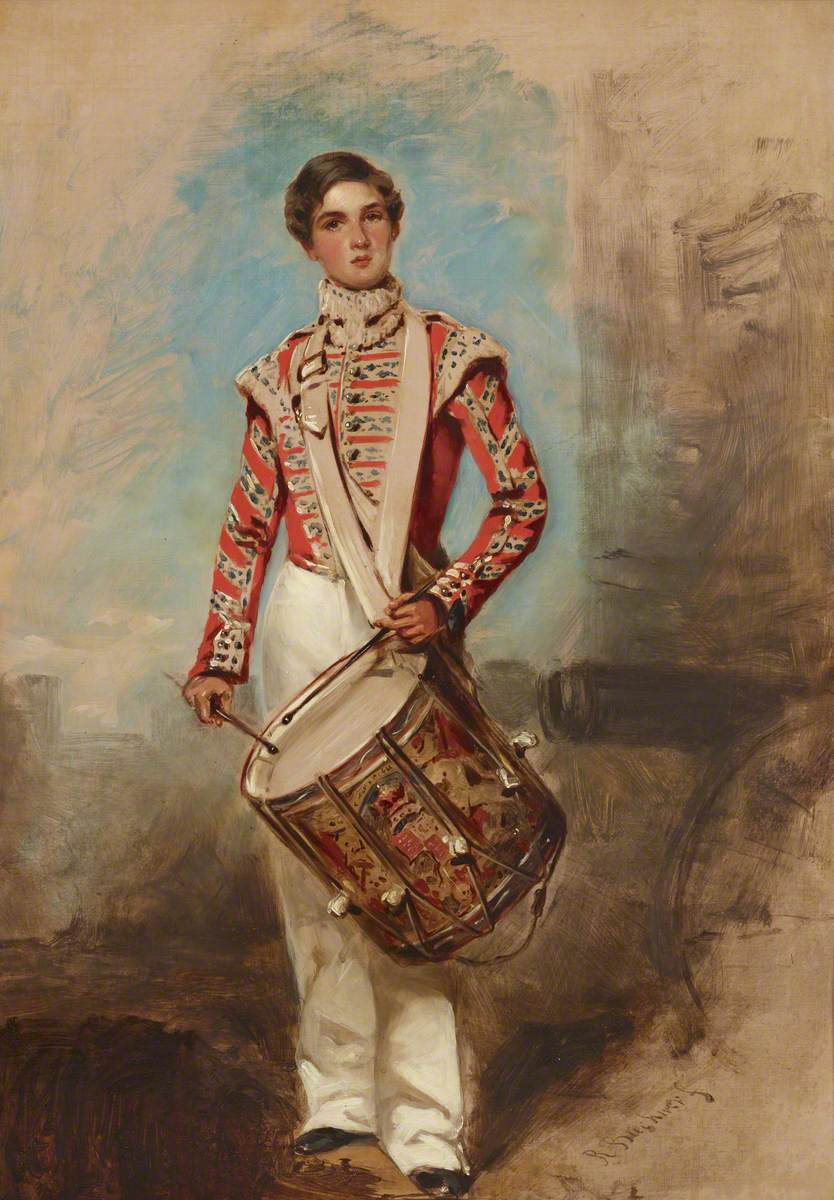
ca. 1854 - Battle of Balaclava Drummer Boy

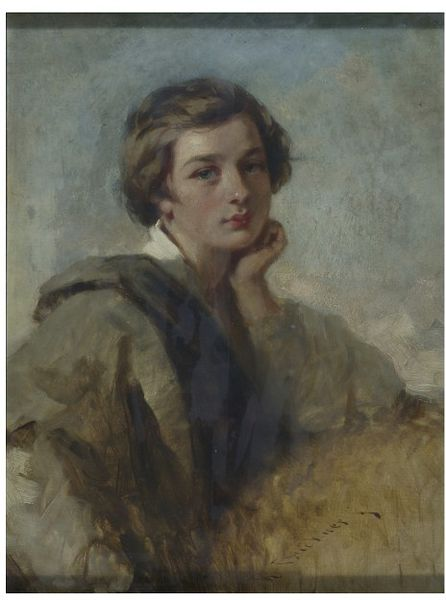
No date - Portrait of a boy

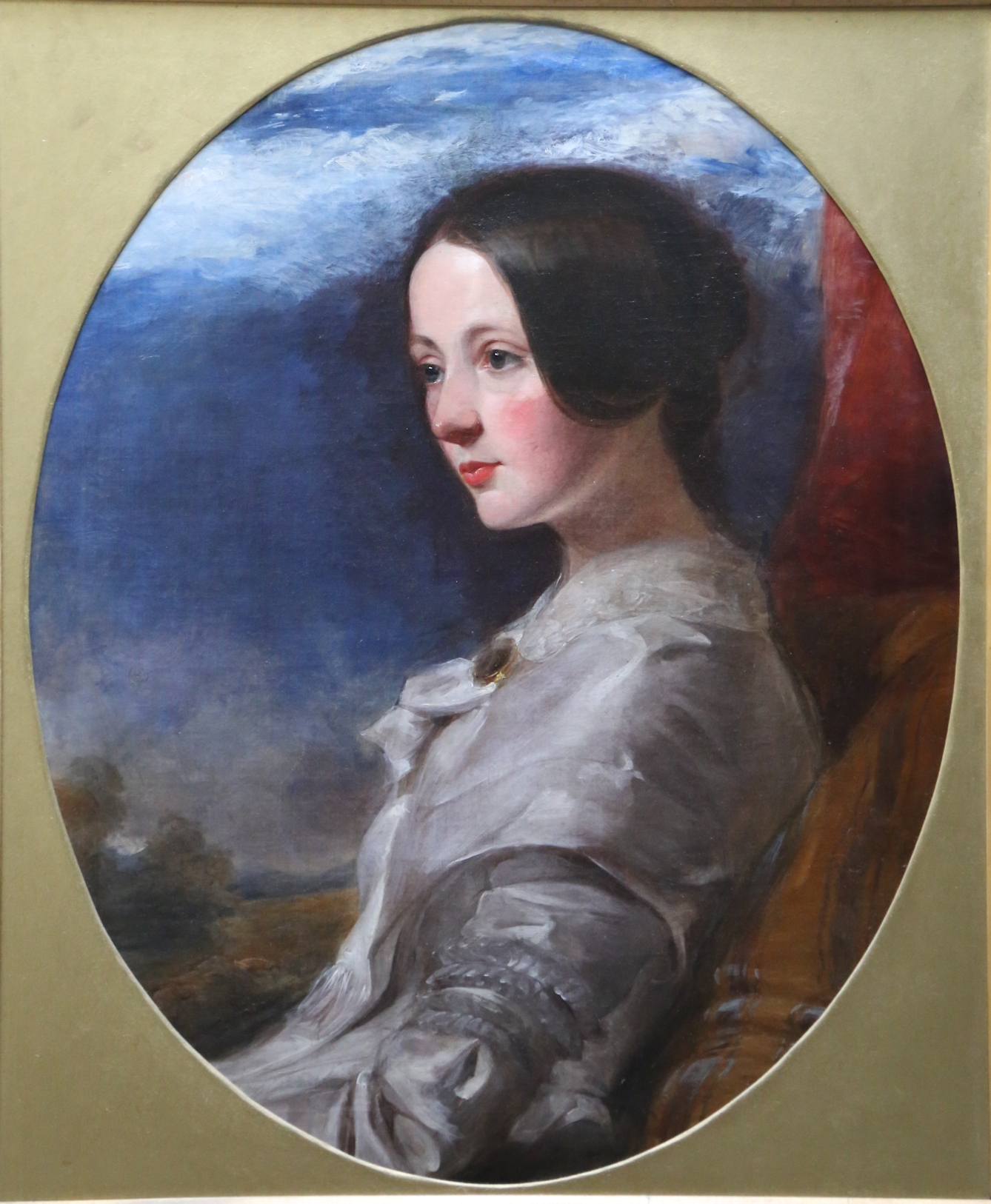
No date - Portrait of a Young Woman

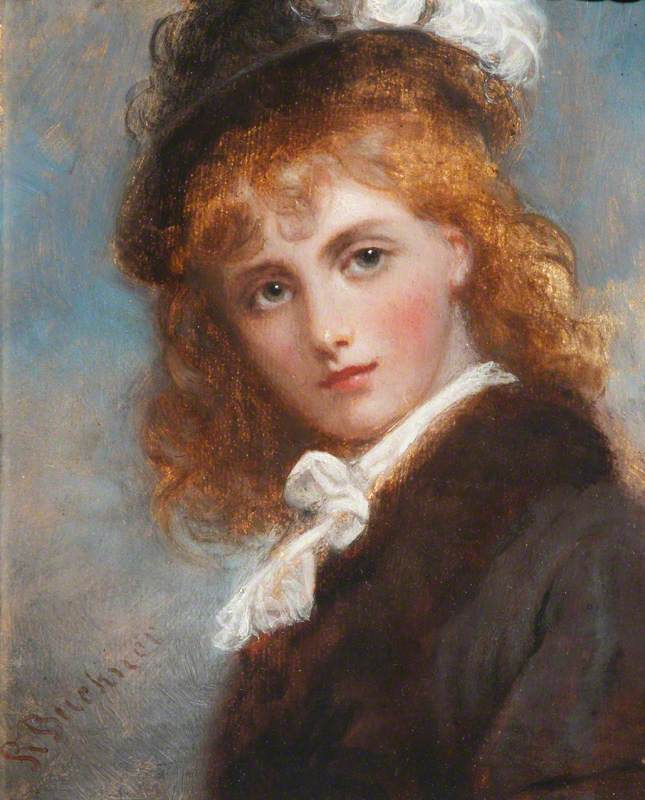
No date - Bust Study of an Unknown Young Girl

=== Italian figures ===
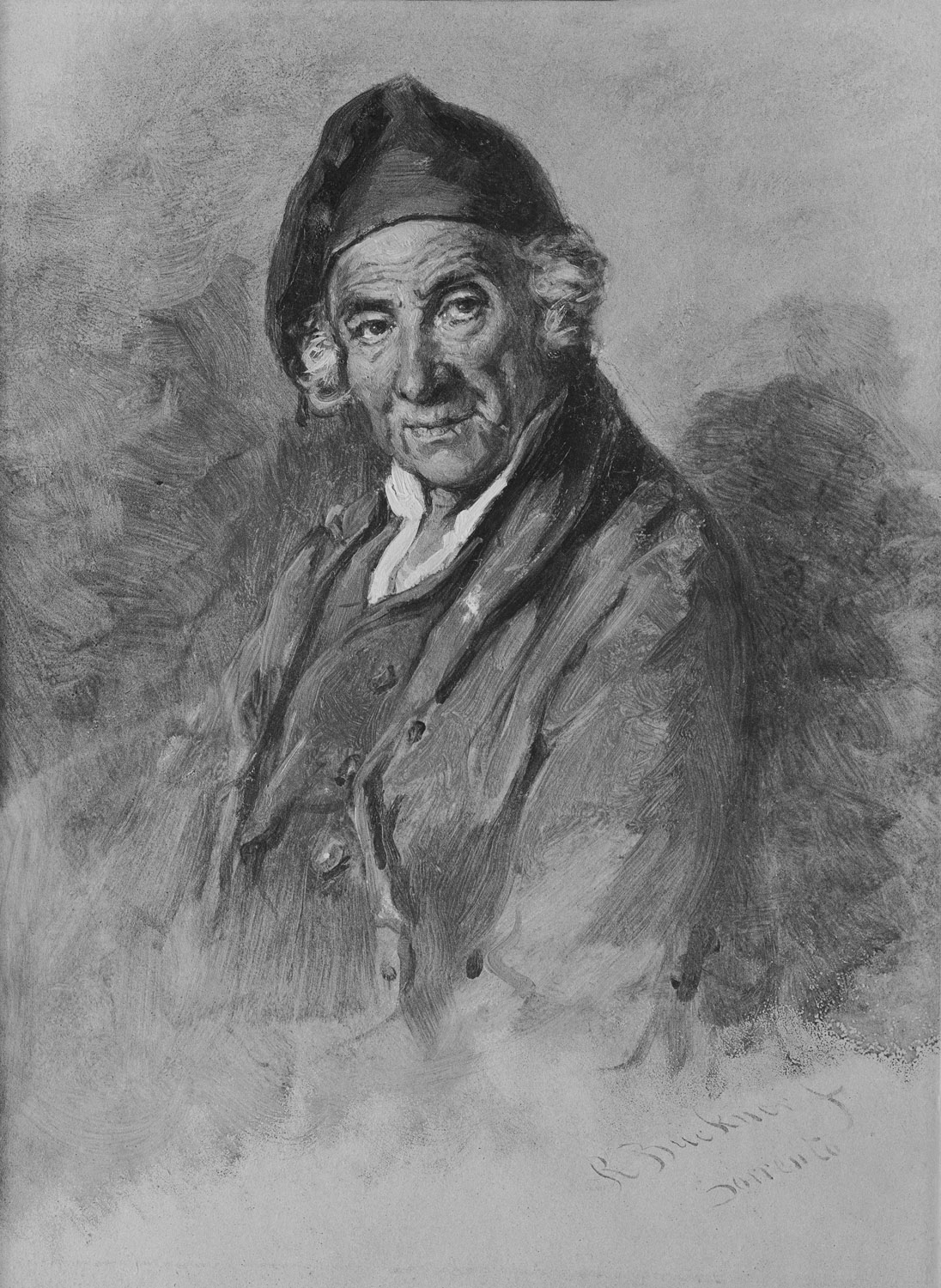
ca. 1842-44 - A Neapolitan Fisherman

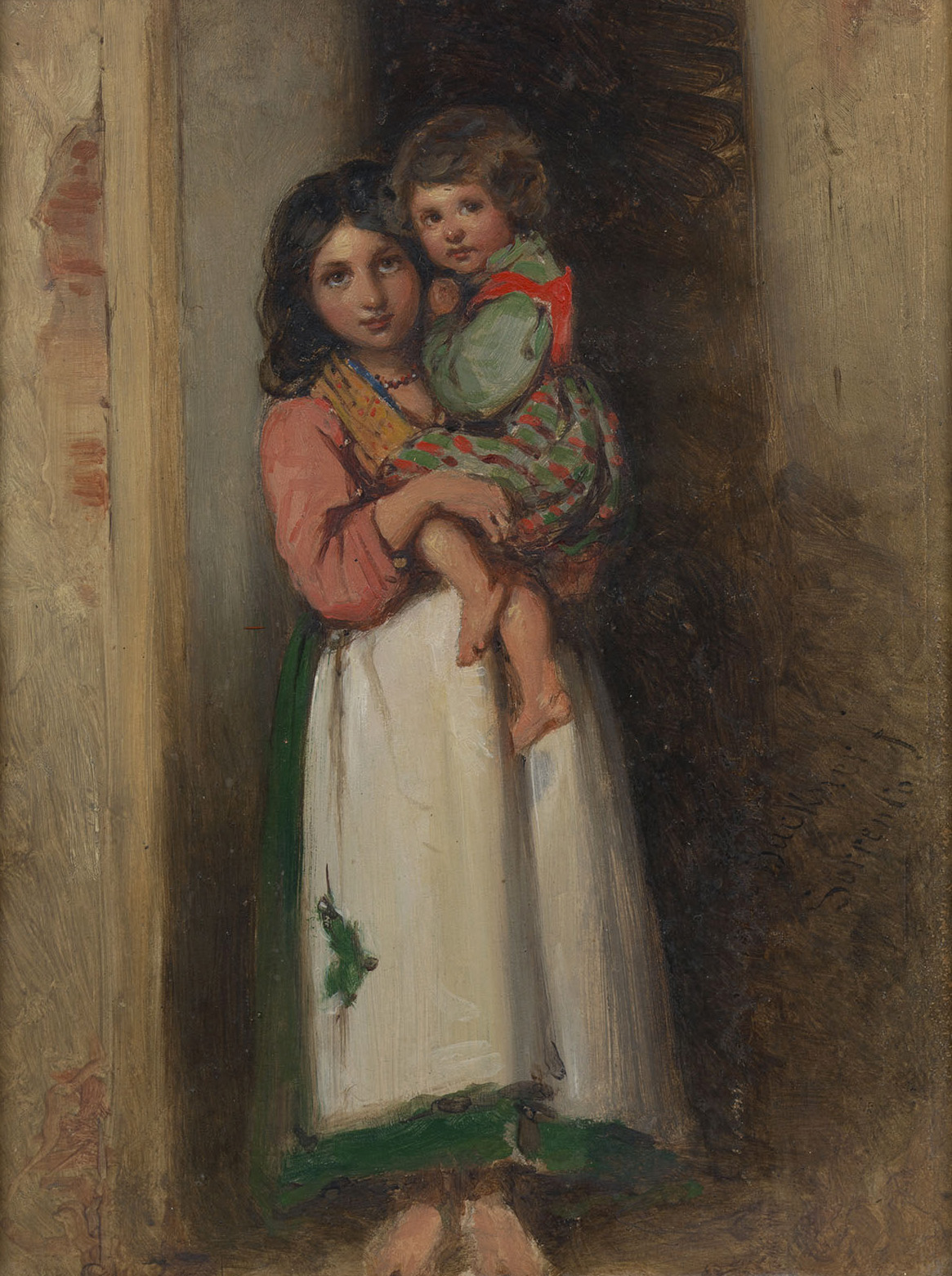
ca. 1842-4 - A Neapolitan peasant girl with a child

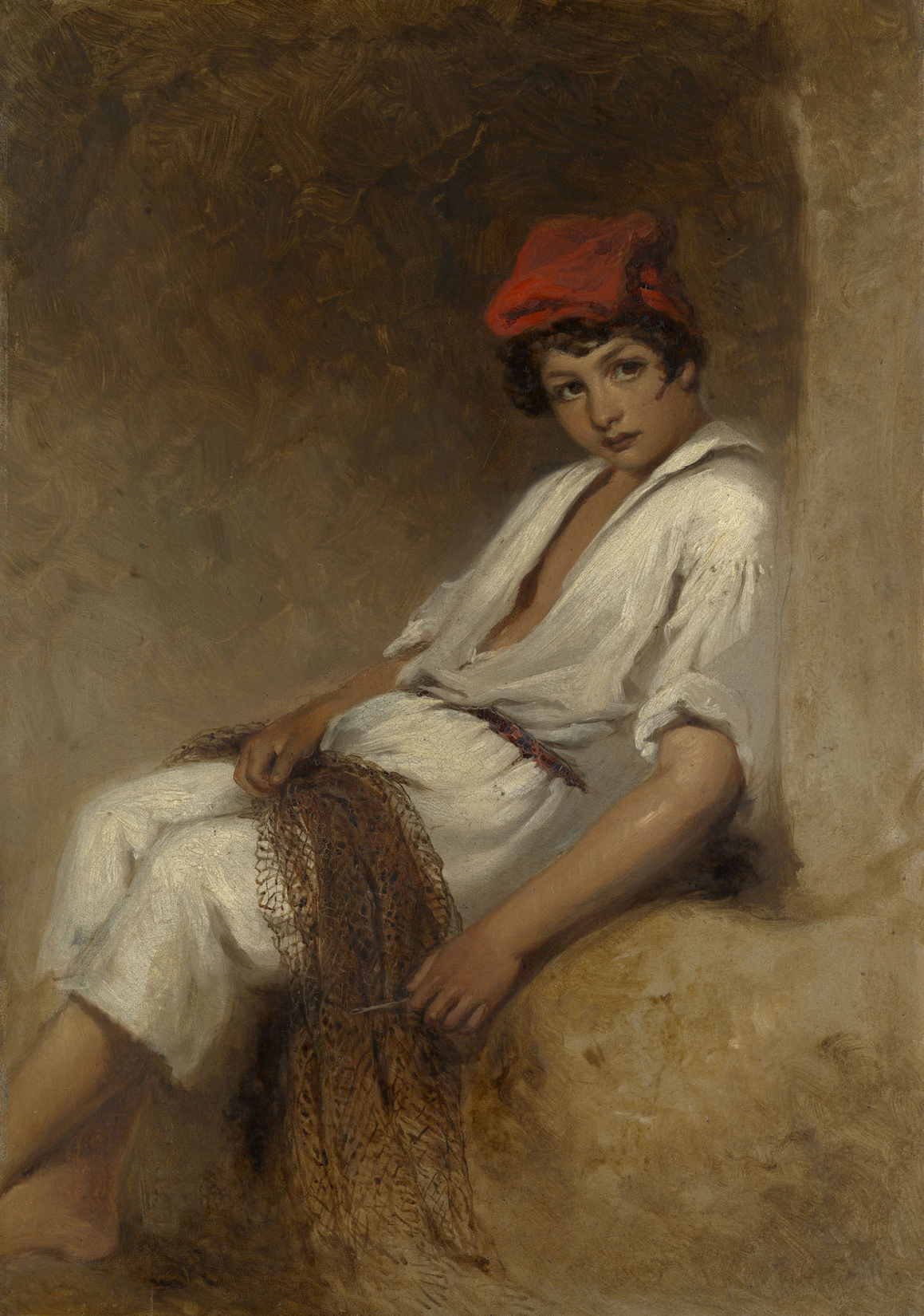
ca. 1842-4 - A Neapolitan fisher-boy

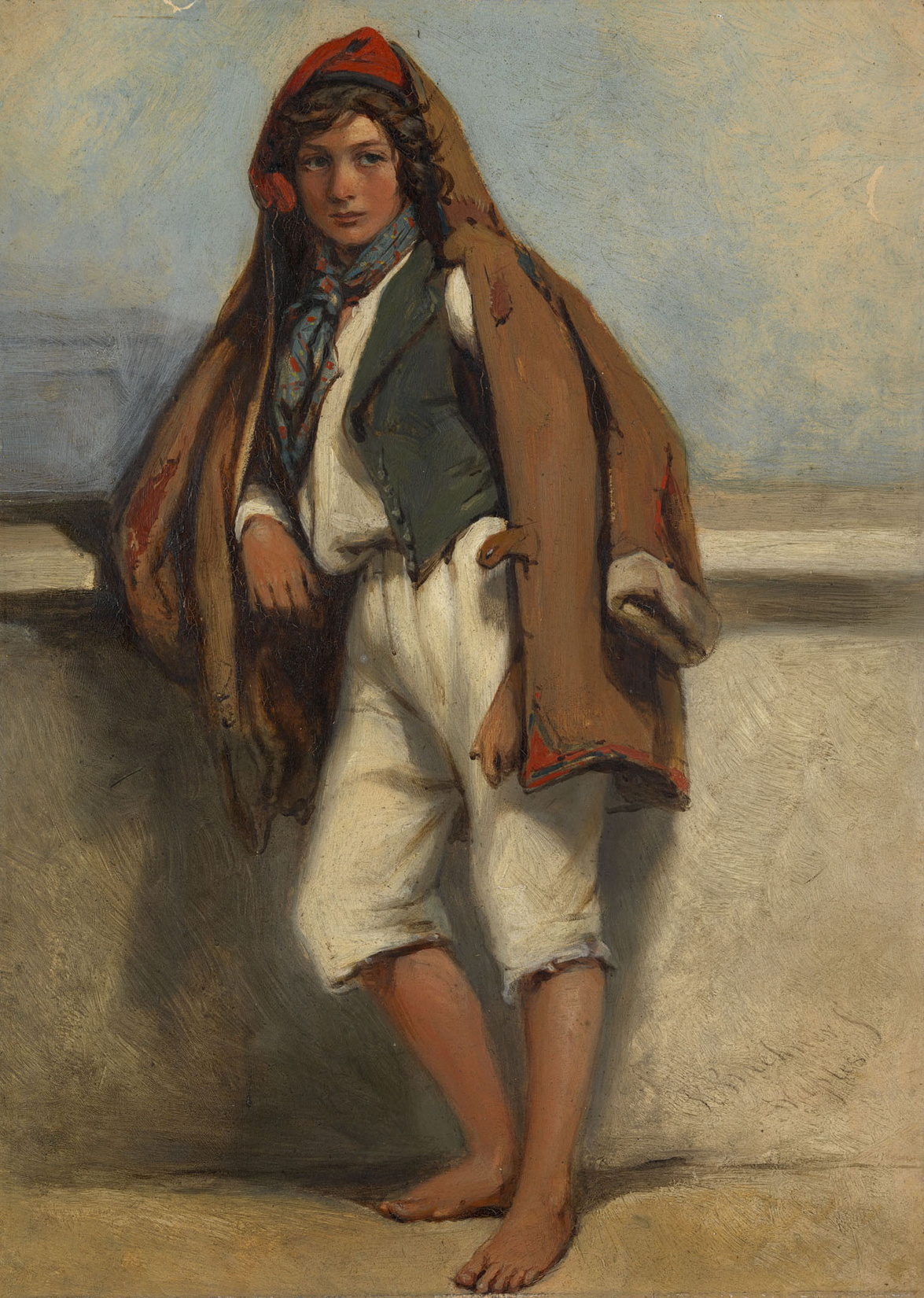
ca. 1842-44 - A Neapolitan Fisherboy

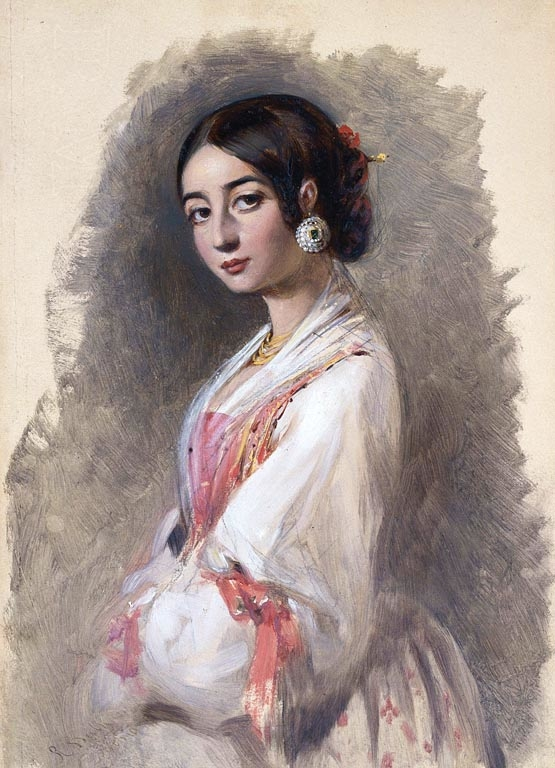
ca. 1842-44 - A Roman peasant girl

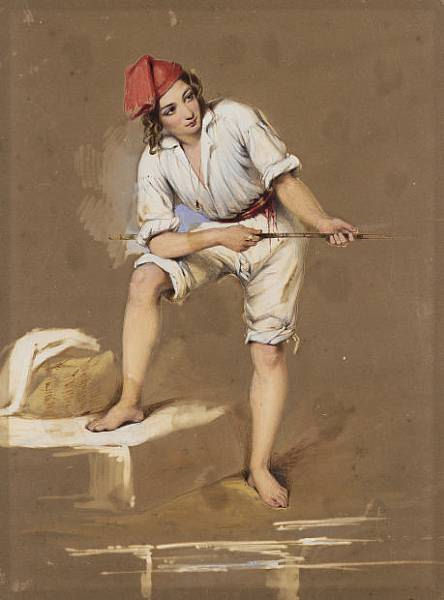
BI 1852 - Neapolitan Fisher-boy

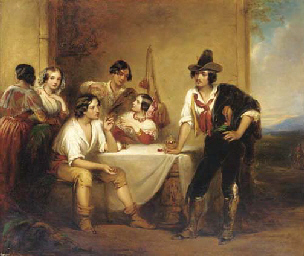
No date - A glass of wine in the Roman campagna

=== Victorian ladies ===
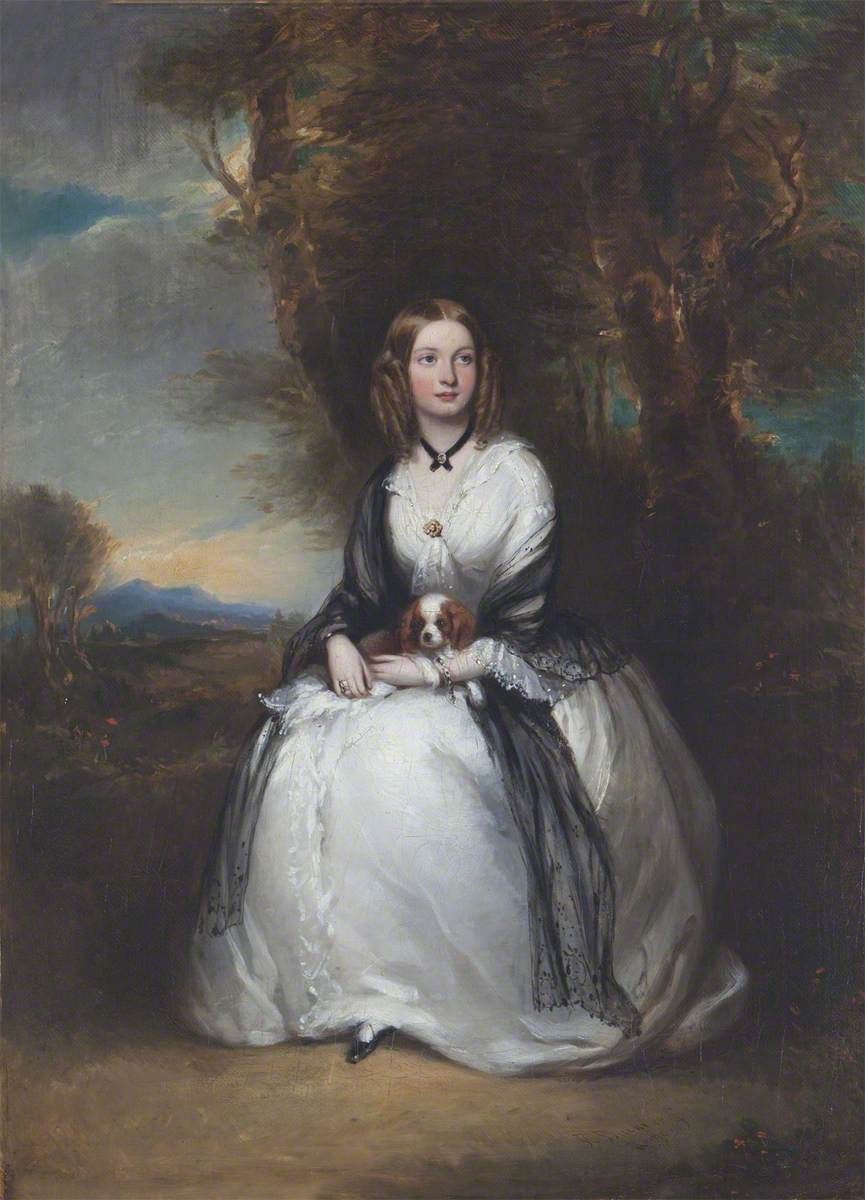
ca. 1842 - Harriet Anne Massingberd (née Langford ca.1820 - 1887)

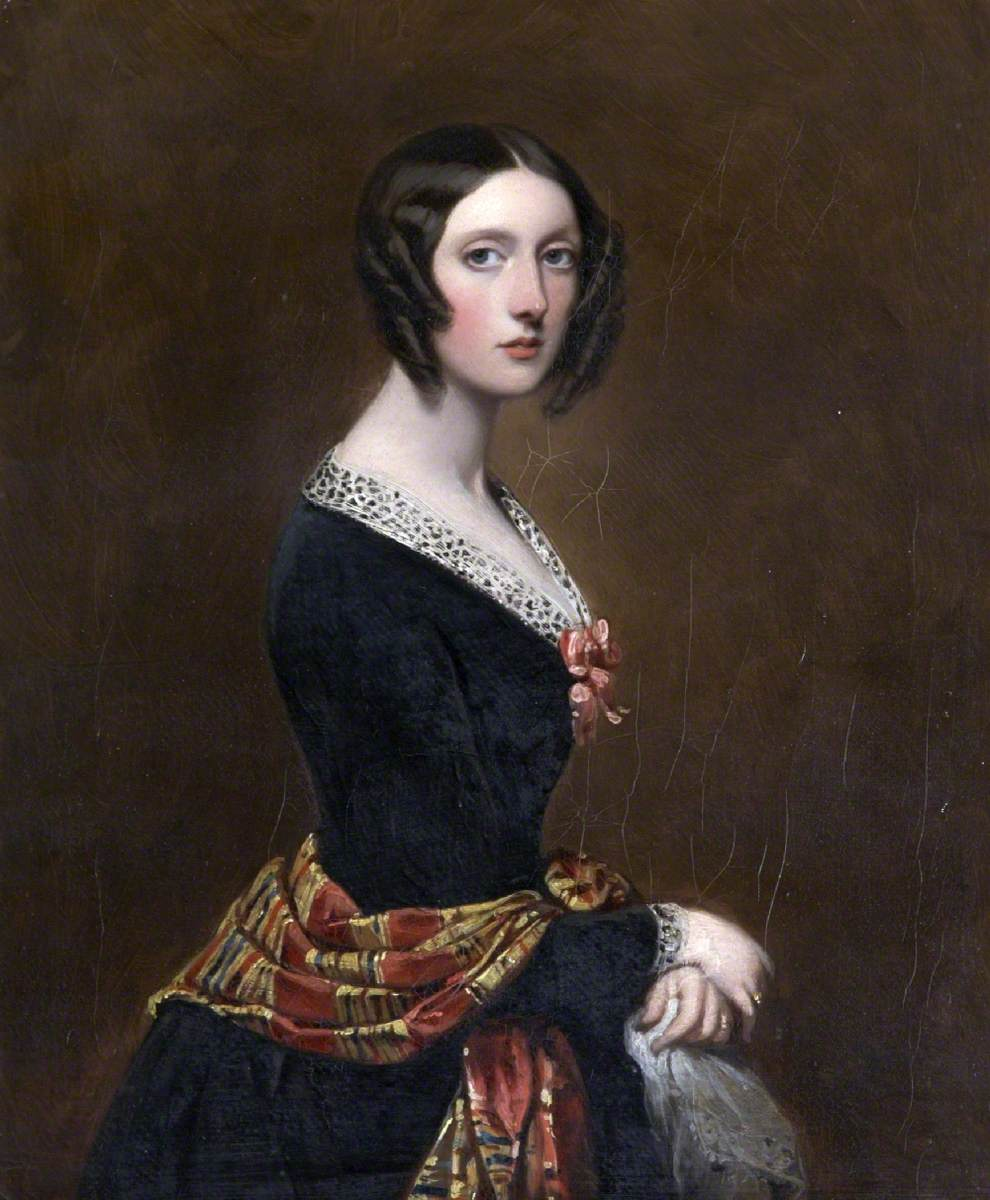
1843 - Harriet Parker, Countess of Morley (née Parker 1809–1897)

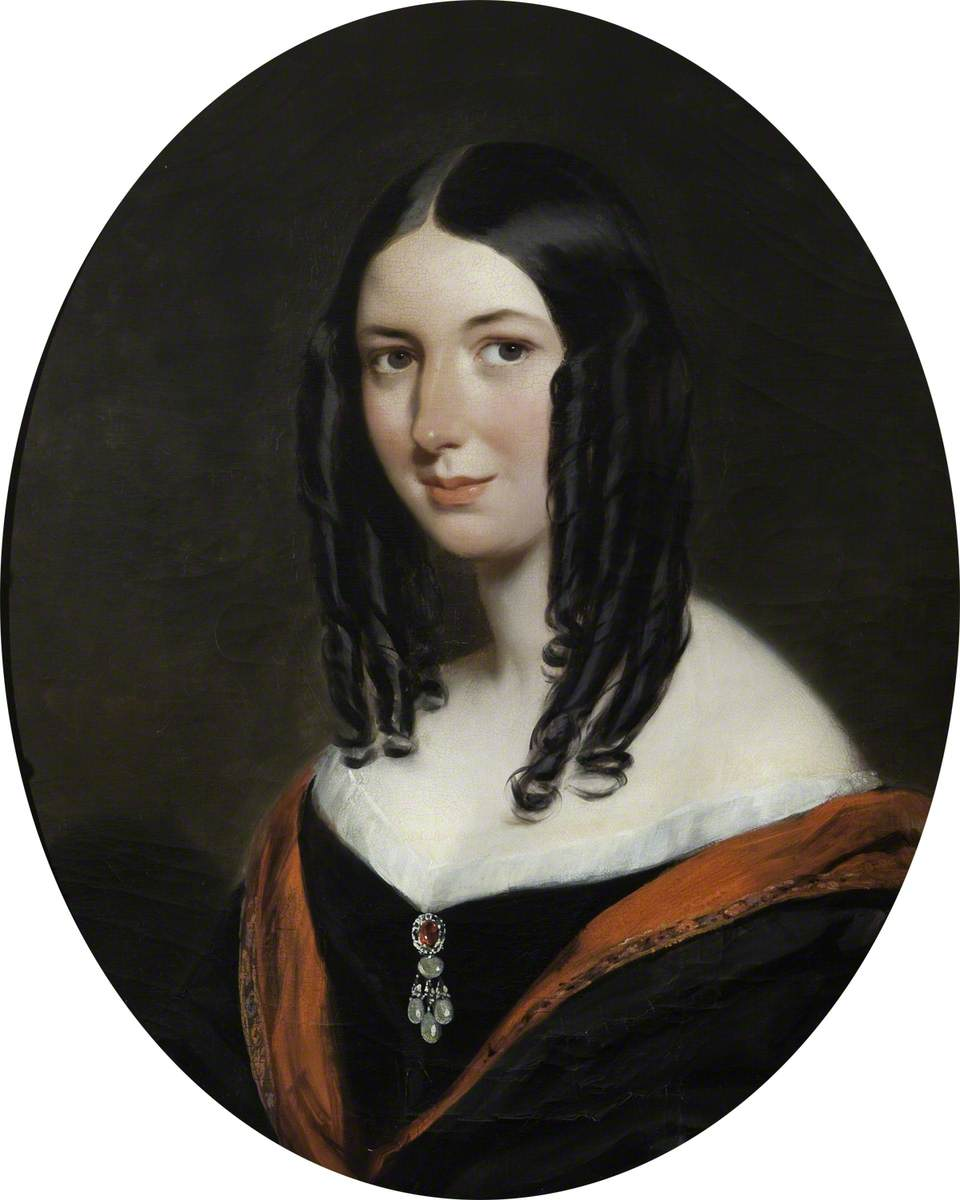
1847 - Mary Elizabeth Lucy (née Williams 1803 – 1890)

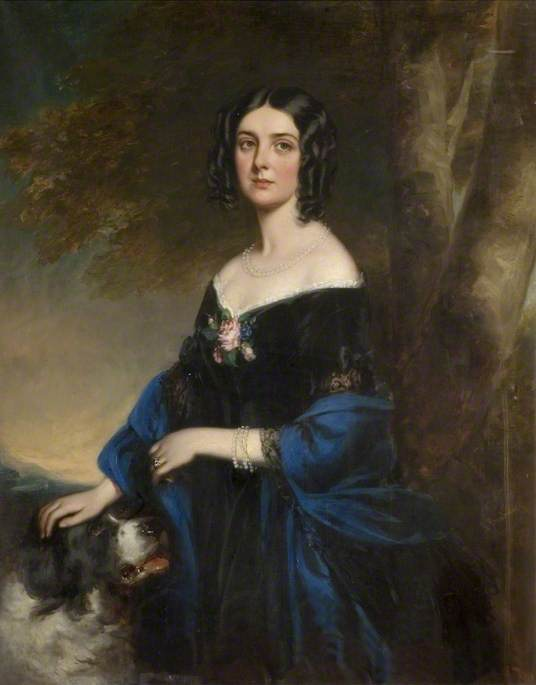
1849 - Margaret Laetitia, Lady Western (née Bushby 1798–1872)

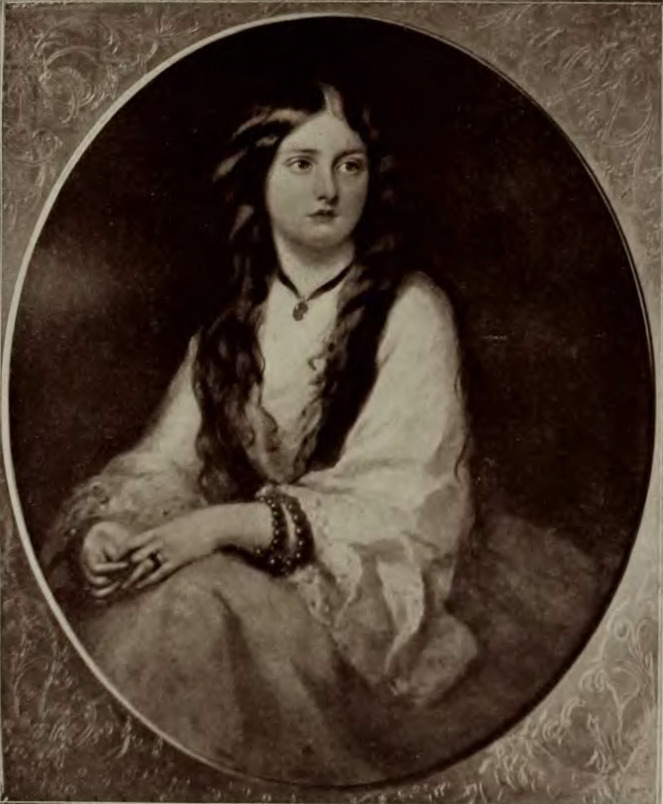
1850 - Georgina Alice Lyster Sartoris (ca. 1827–1863)

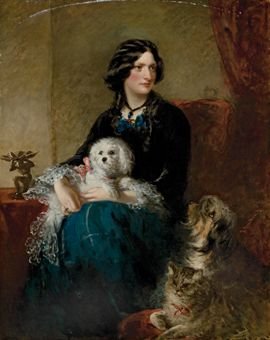
RA 1850 - Lady Cecilia Paget (née Wyndham 1829-1914)

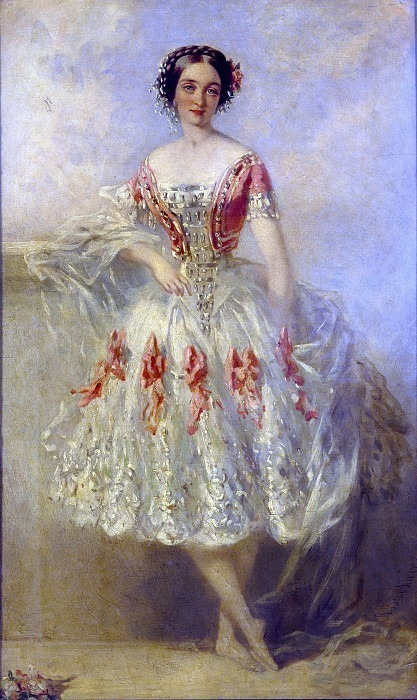
1854 - Marie-Adeline Plunkett (1824 - 1910)

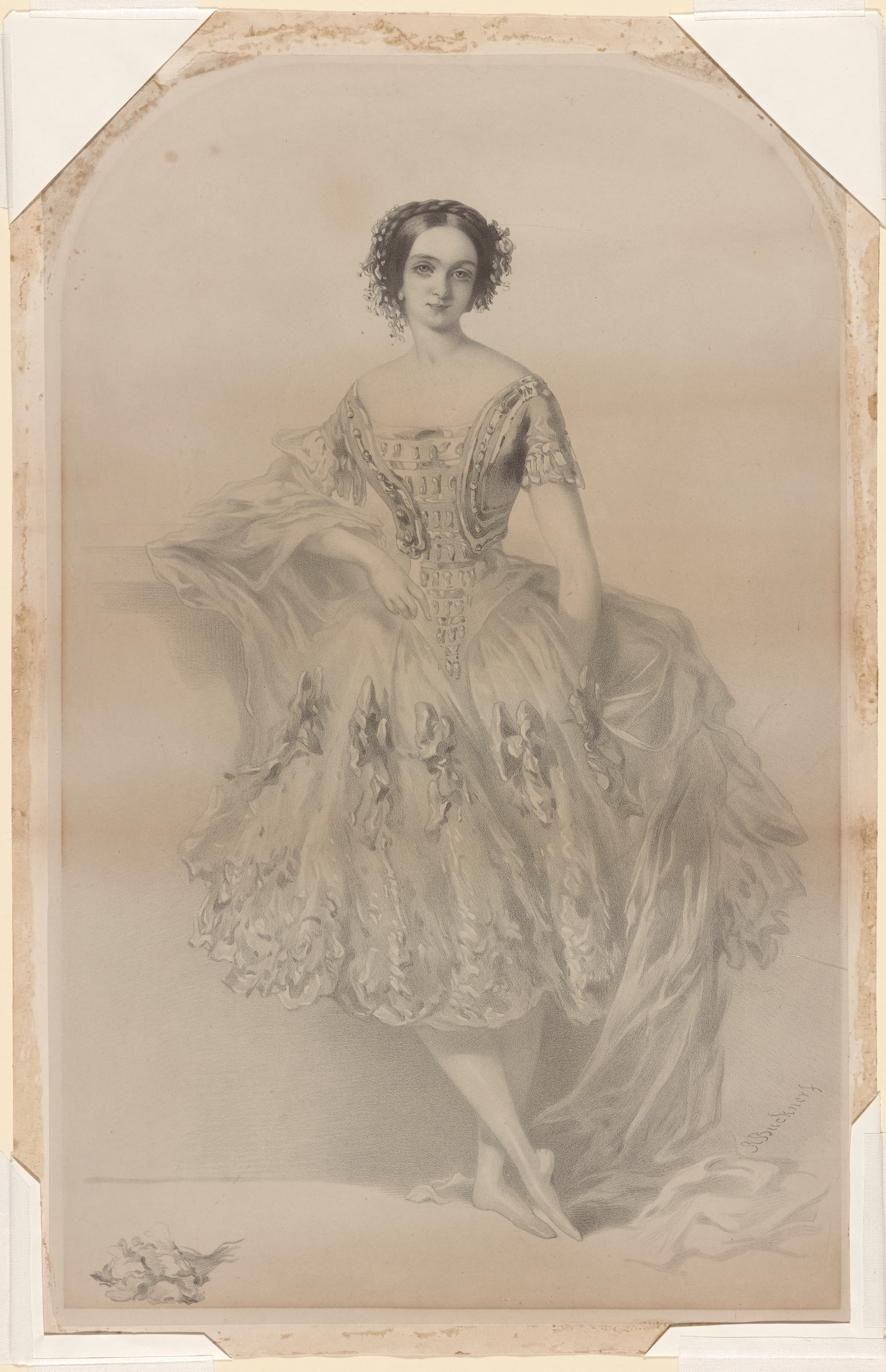
1854 - Engraving from the Buckner original

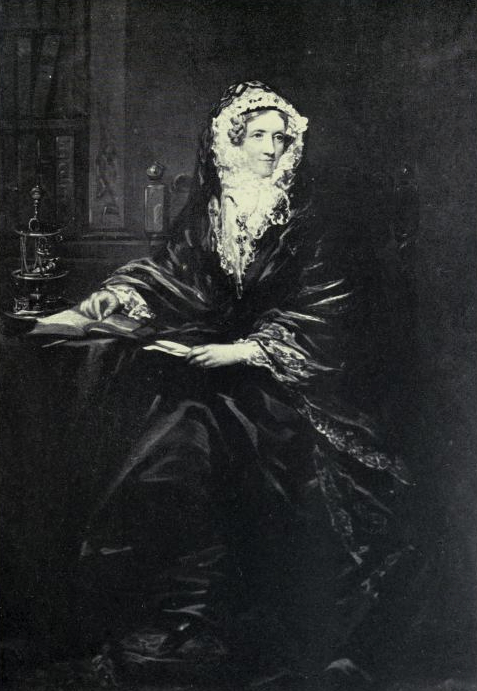
1854 - Lady Olivia Sparrow (née Acheson 1776–1863)

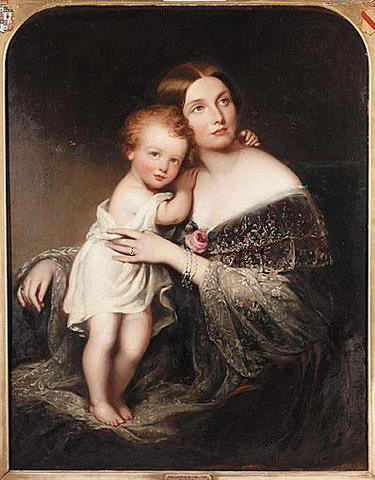
RA/SS 1855 - Princess Marie Baden, Duchess of Hamilton (1817 - 1888)

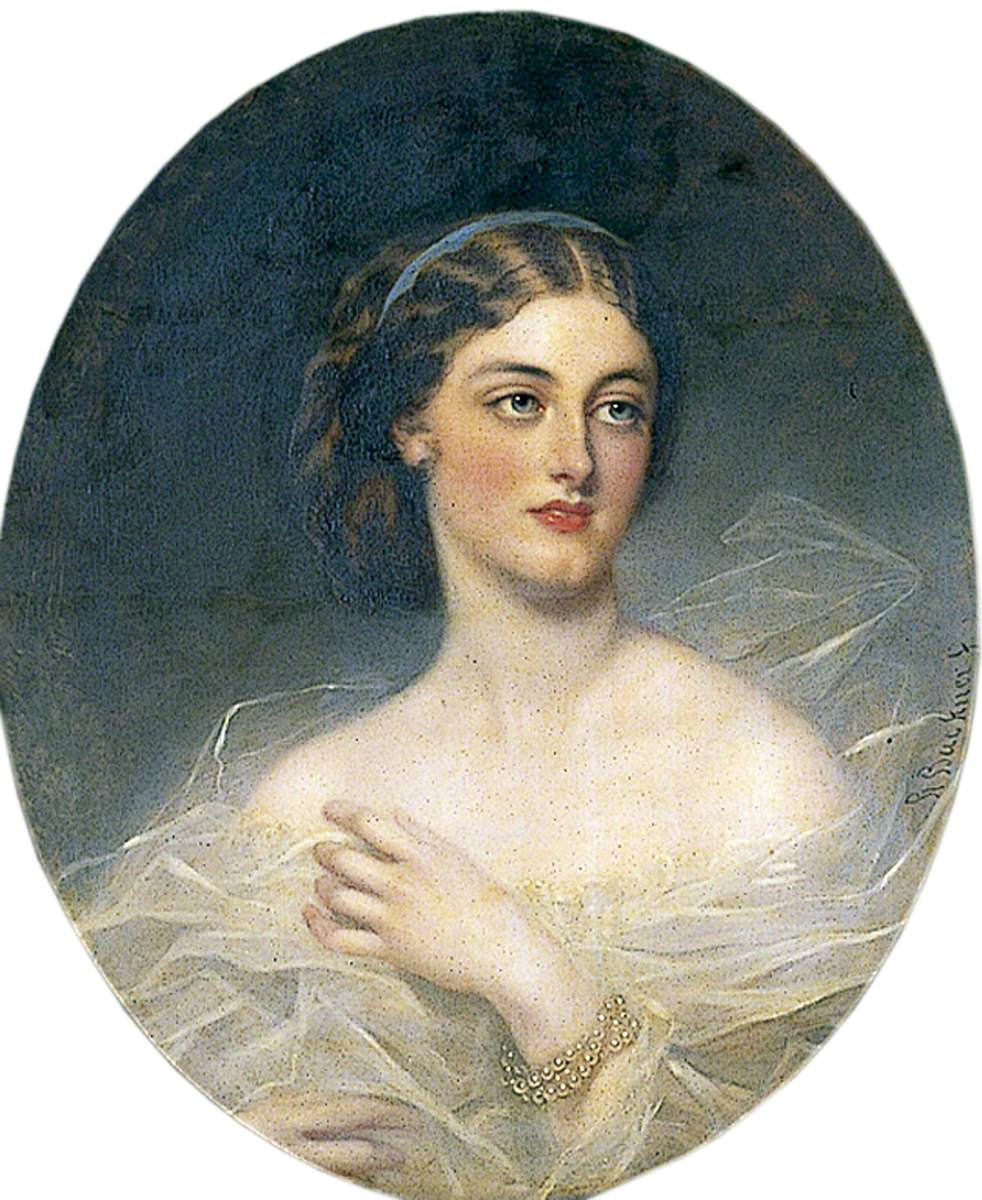
ca. 1860 Miss Eleanor Webster (later Mrs Luke Hansard ca. 1854–1936)

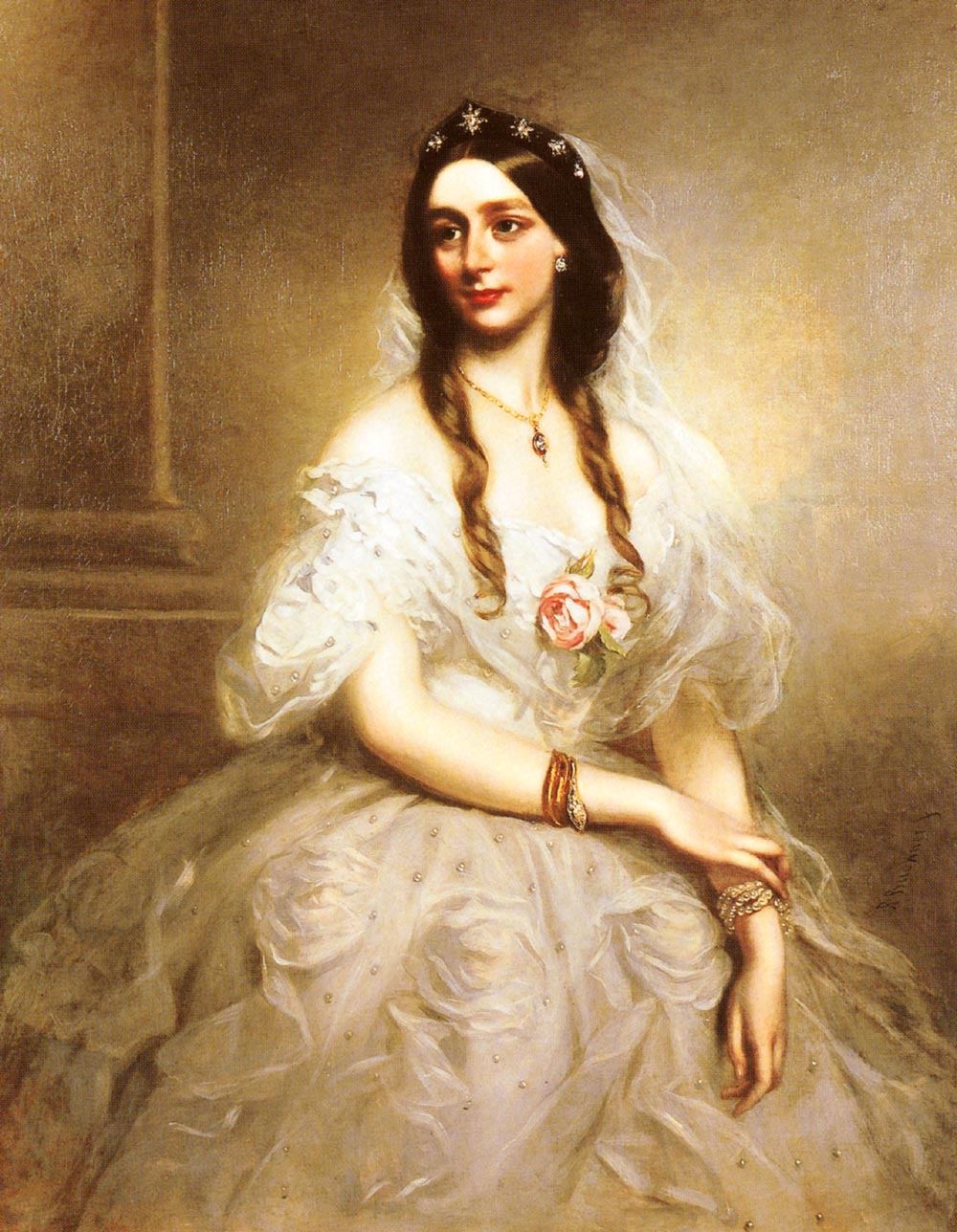
1861 Georgina Stoughton (née Gosset ca.1830-1907)

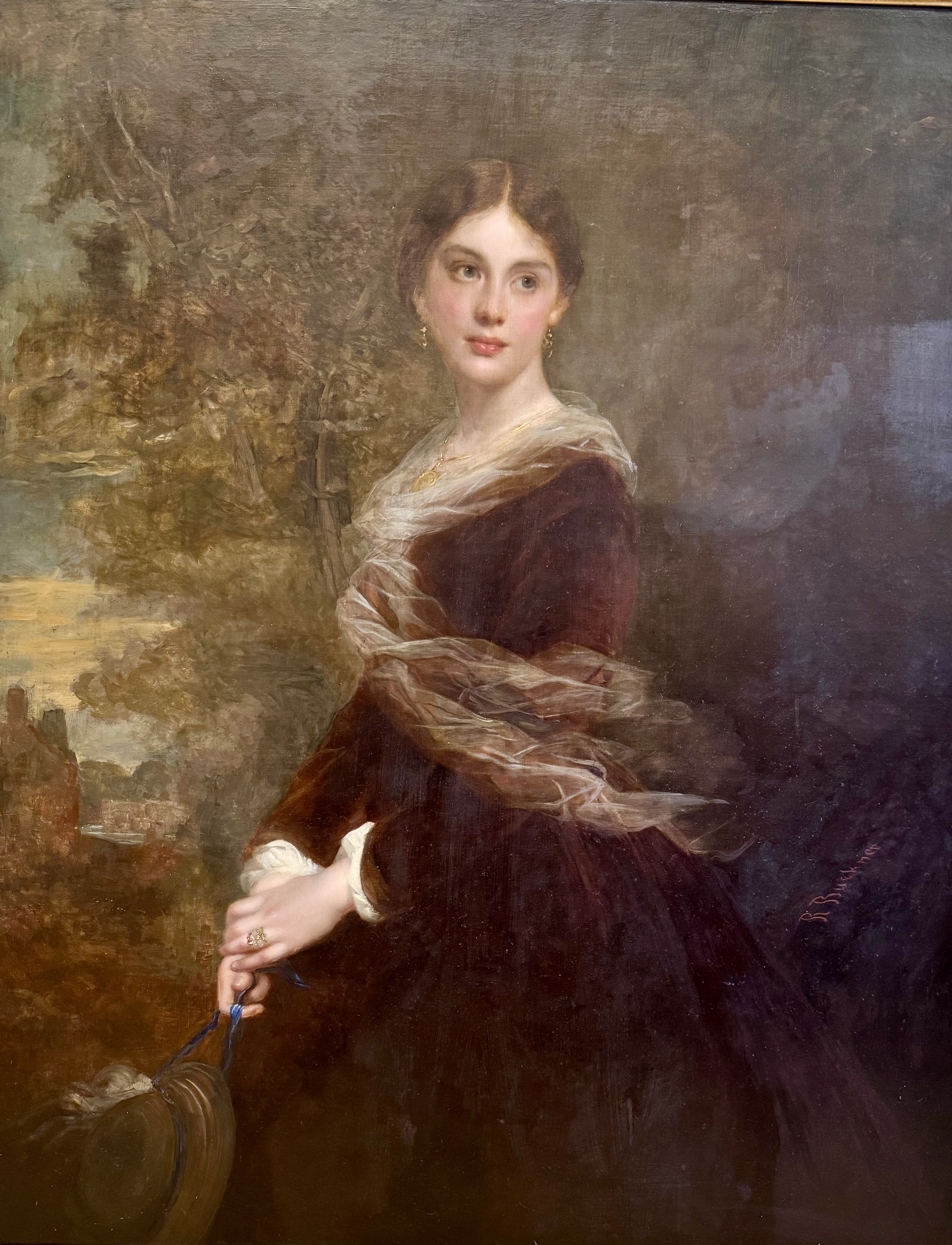
RA 1869 - Mrs Beatrice Bolton (née Ireland - 1839-1924)

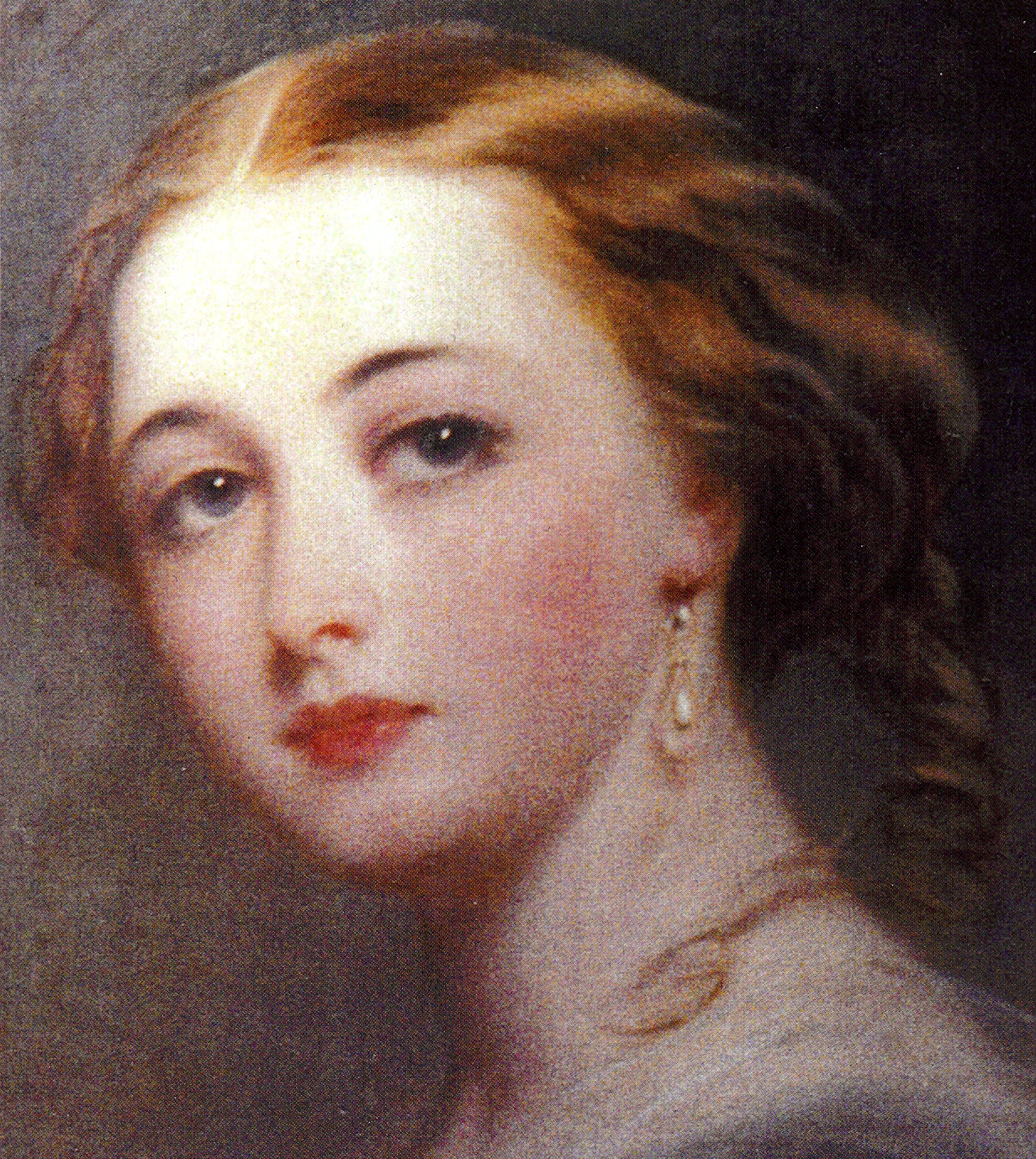
RA 1871 - Laura Thistlethwayte (née Bell 1819-1894)

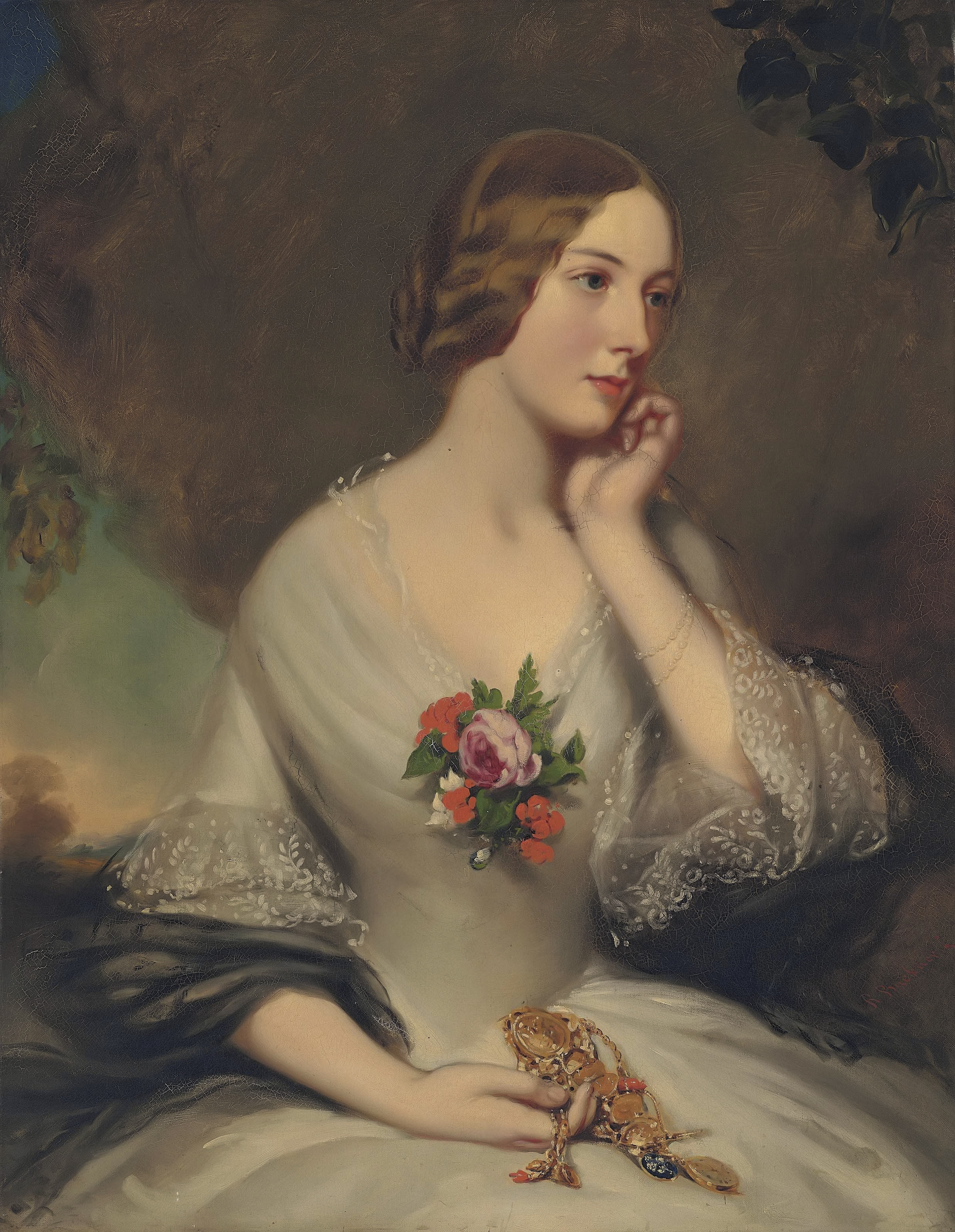
No date - Lady Elizabeth Baring (née Sturt 1827-1867}

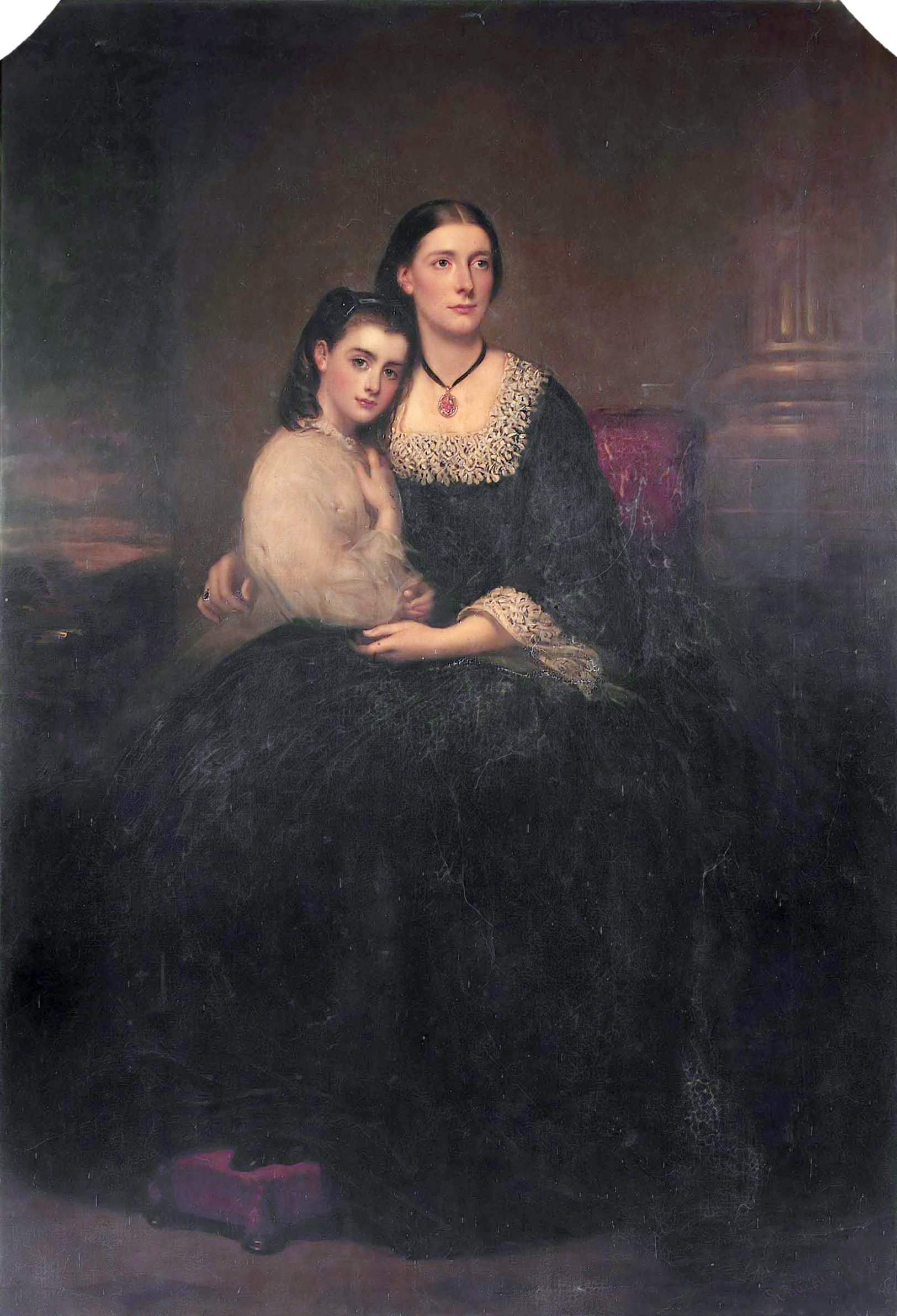
No date - Emily, 1st Vicountess Hambleden (née Smith 1828-1913) and her daughter

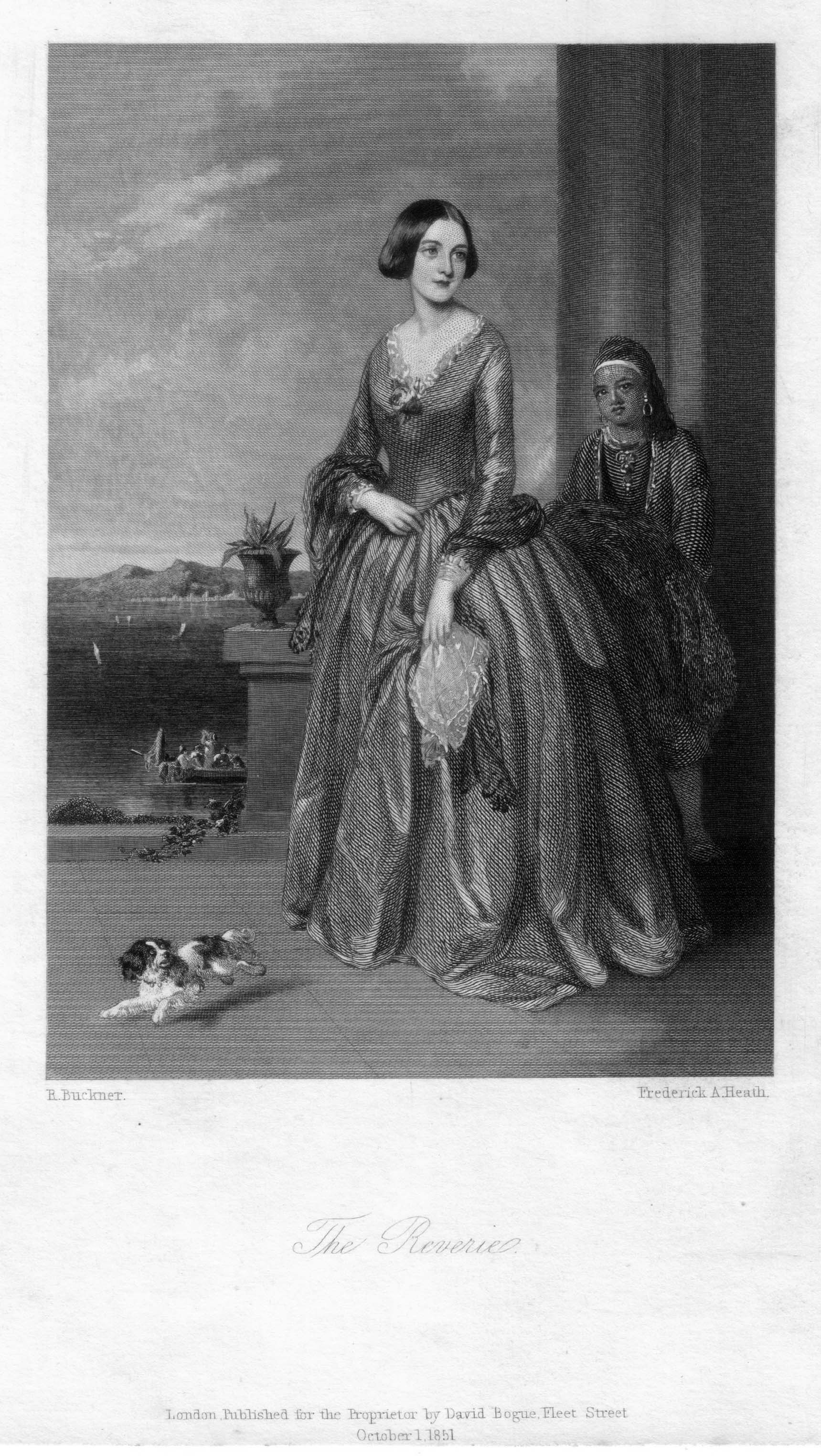
No date - Unnamed woman (after Buckner)

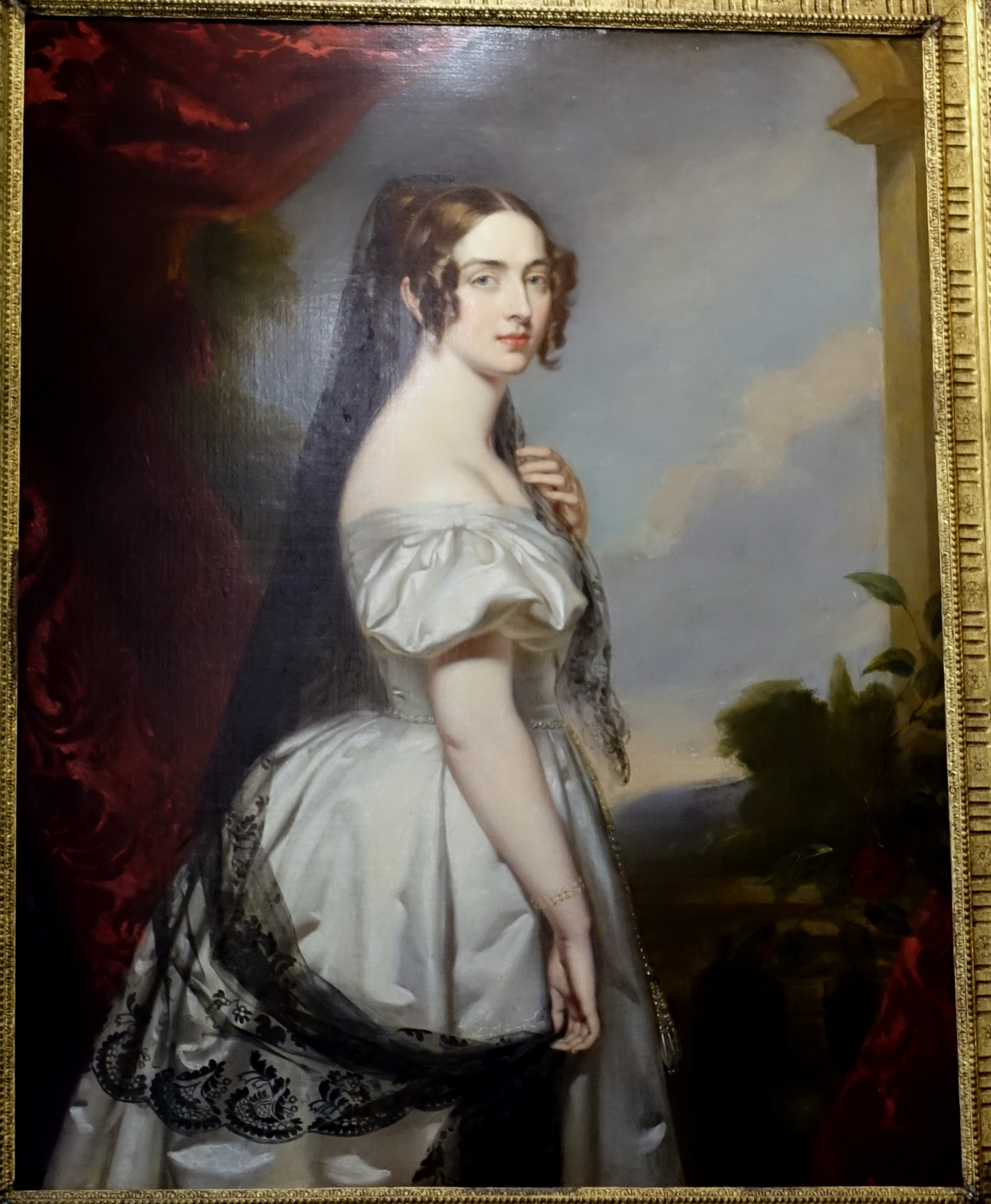
No date - Harriet Marchioness of Clanricarde (née Canning 1804-1876)

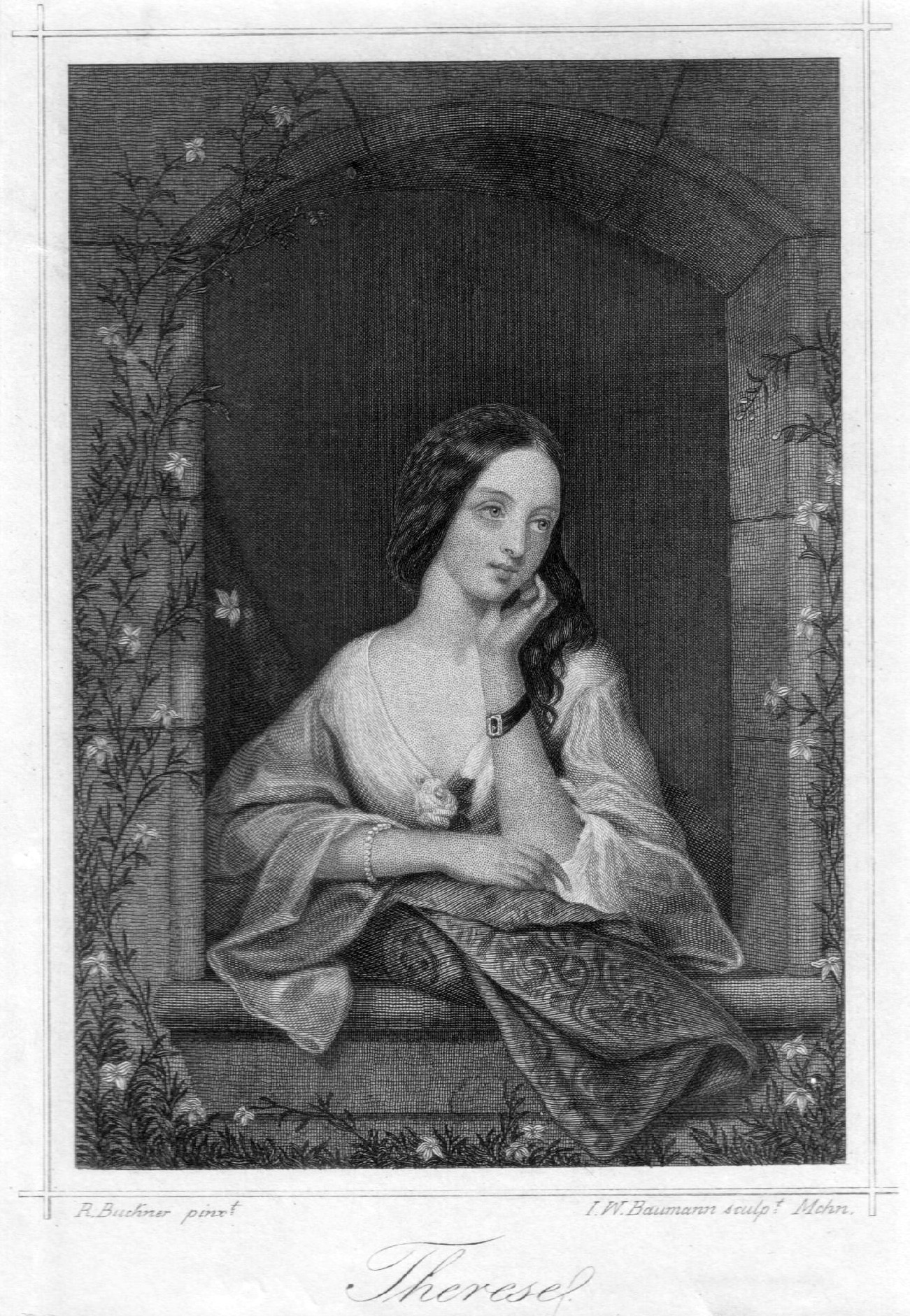
No date - "Therese" (after Buckner)

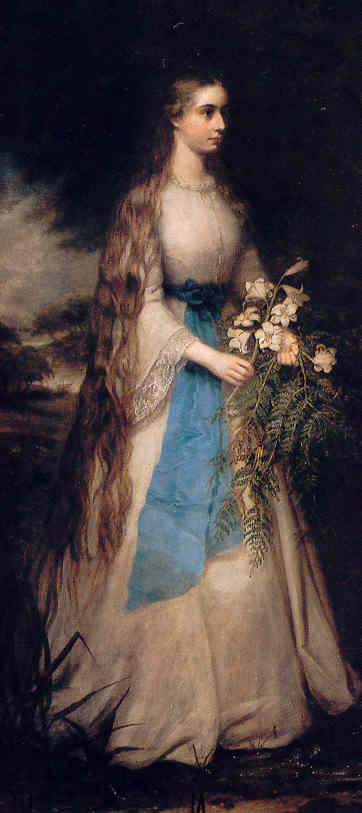
No date - Lady Margaret Stepney-Cowell (née Warren 1847-1921)

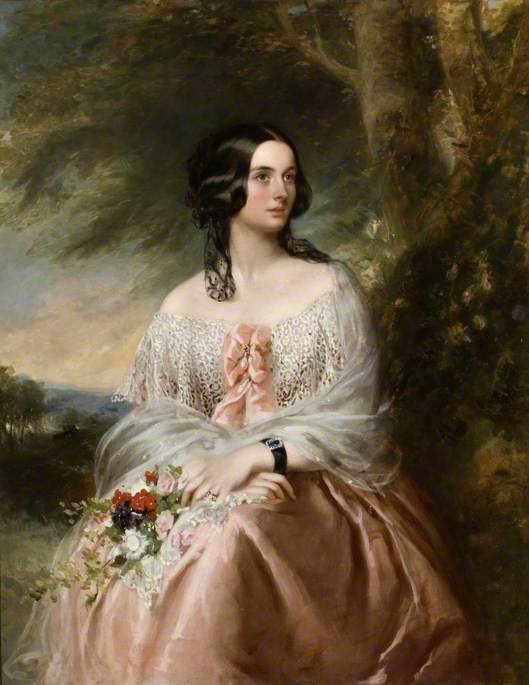
No date - Lady Emily Isham (née Vaughan 1824-1898)

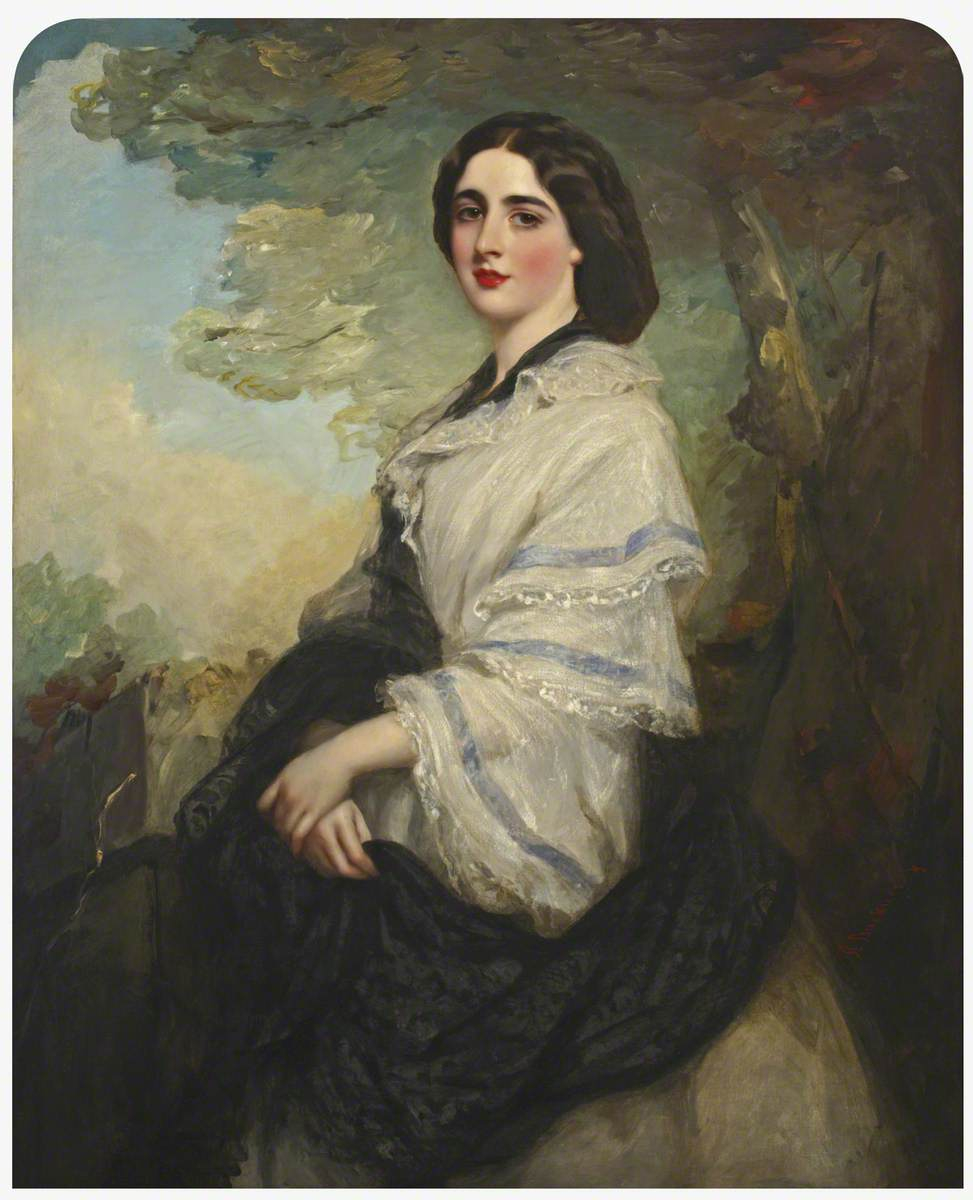
No date - Georgina Lopes (née Newman 1839-1912)

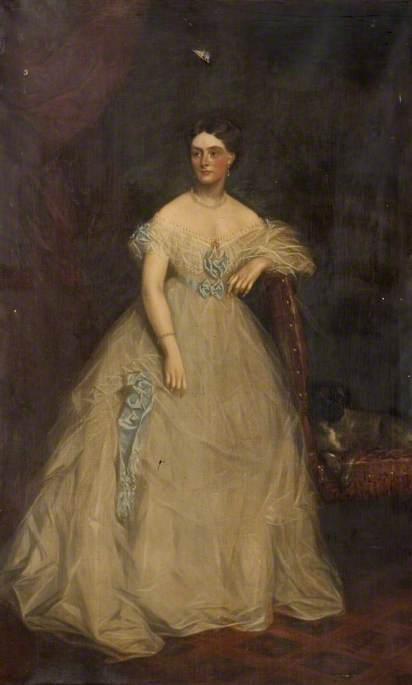
No date Unknown "Lady wearing a white dress"

=== Victorian men ===
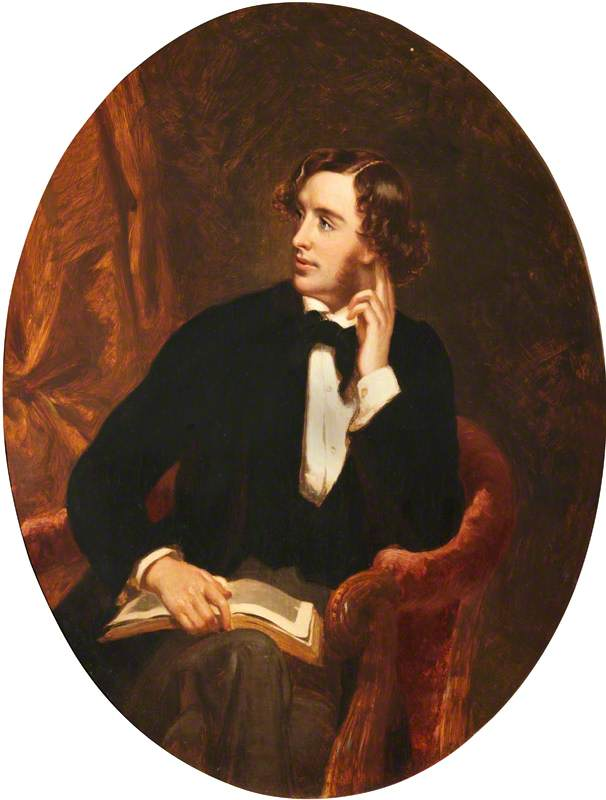
ca. 1842 - George Smythe (1818-1857)

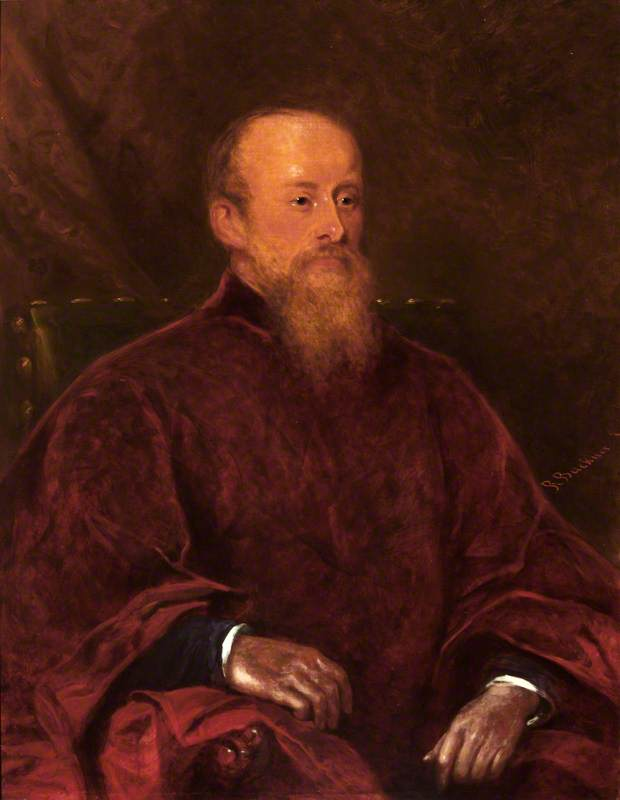
ca. 1850 - Horatio William Walpole (1813-1894)

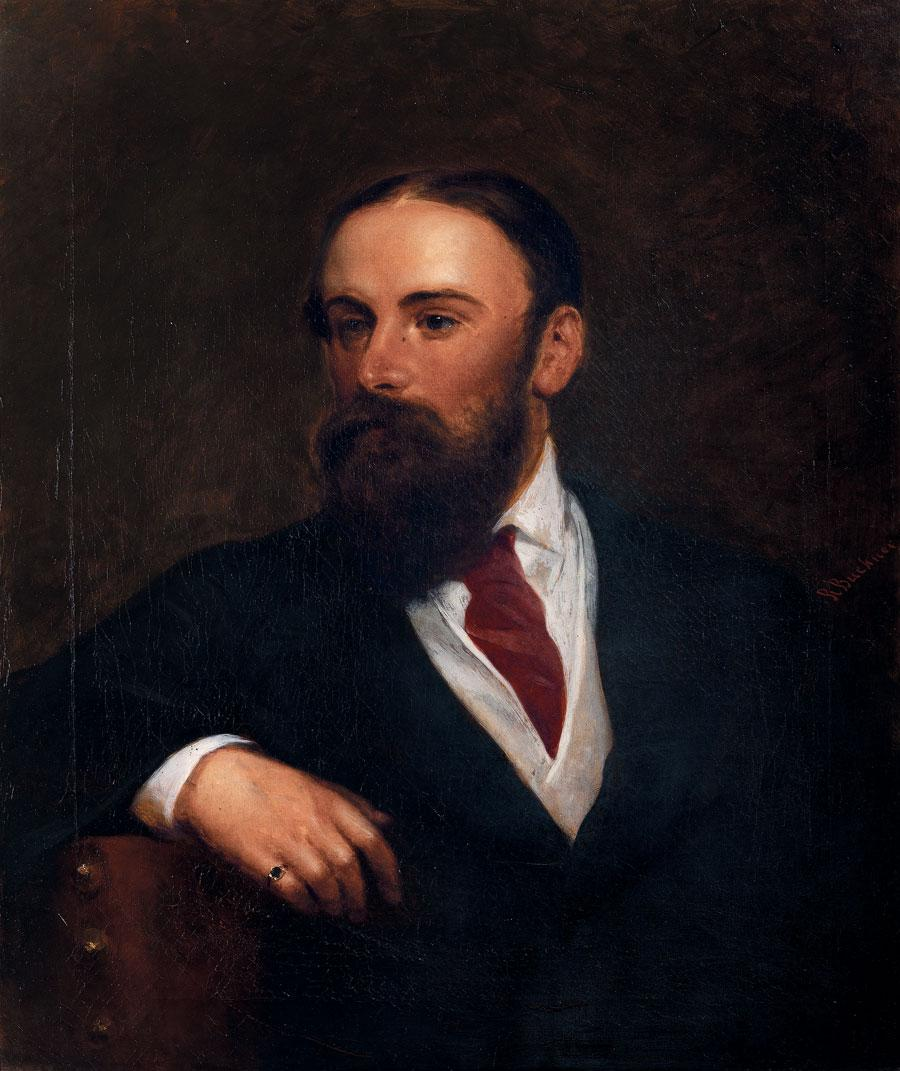
ca. 1850 Sir Wyndham Knatchbull (1795/96 – 1868)

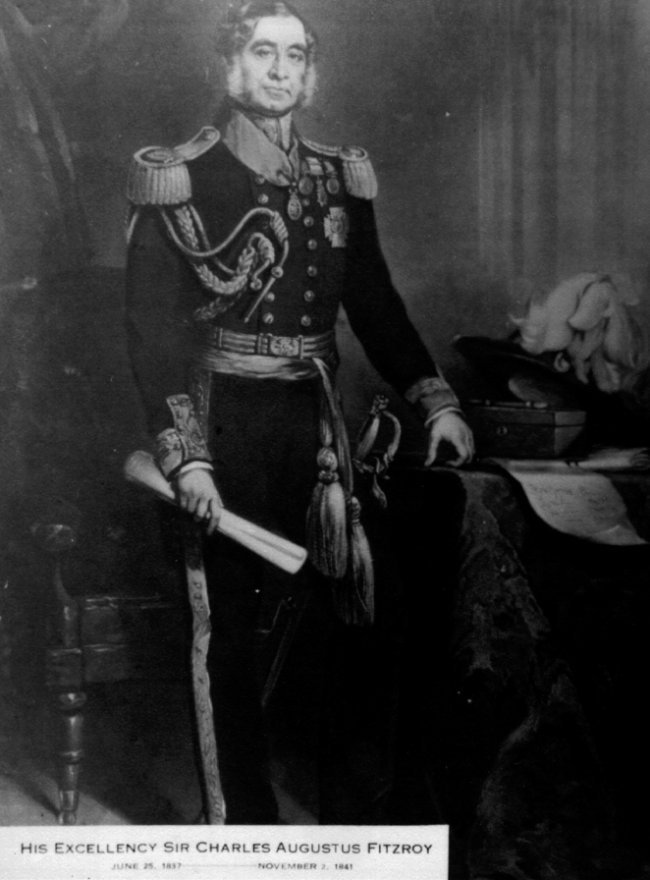
1856 - Sir Charles Augustus FitzRoy (1796-1858), KCH, KCB

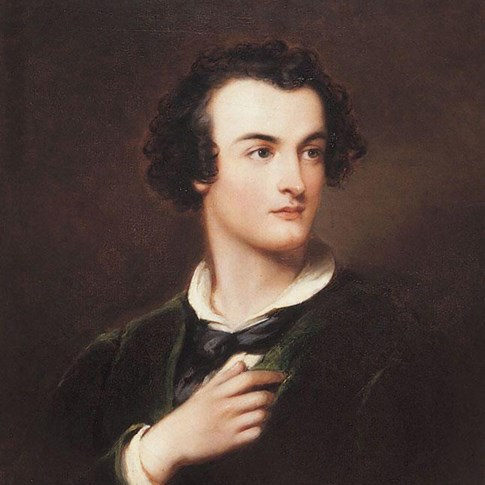
SS 1855 William Hamilton, 11th Duke of Hamilton William Hamilton (1811-1863)

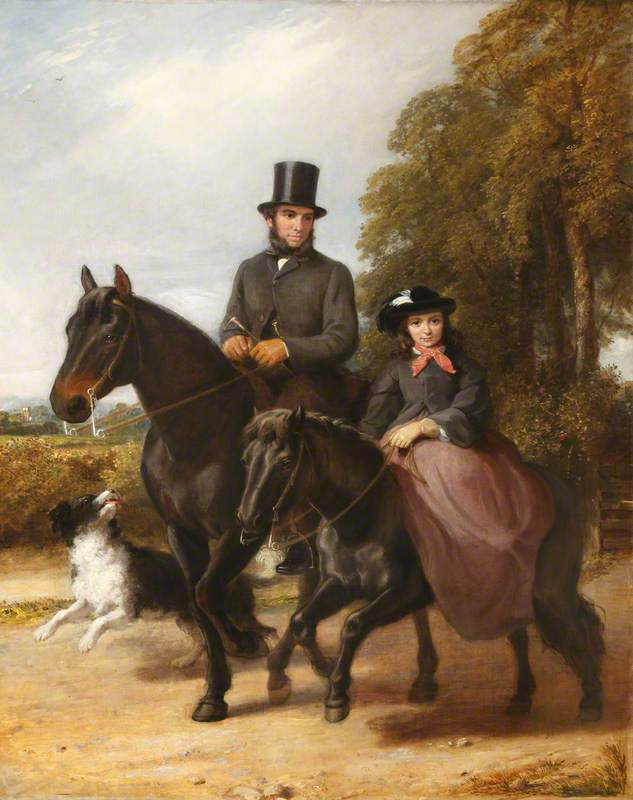
1861 - George Ward (1822–1887), and His Daughter Fanny (1850–1939)

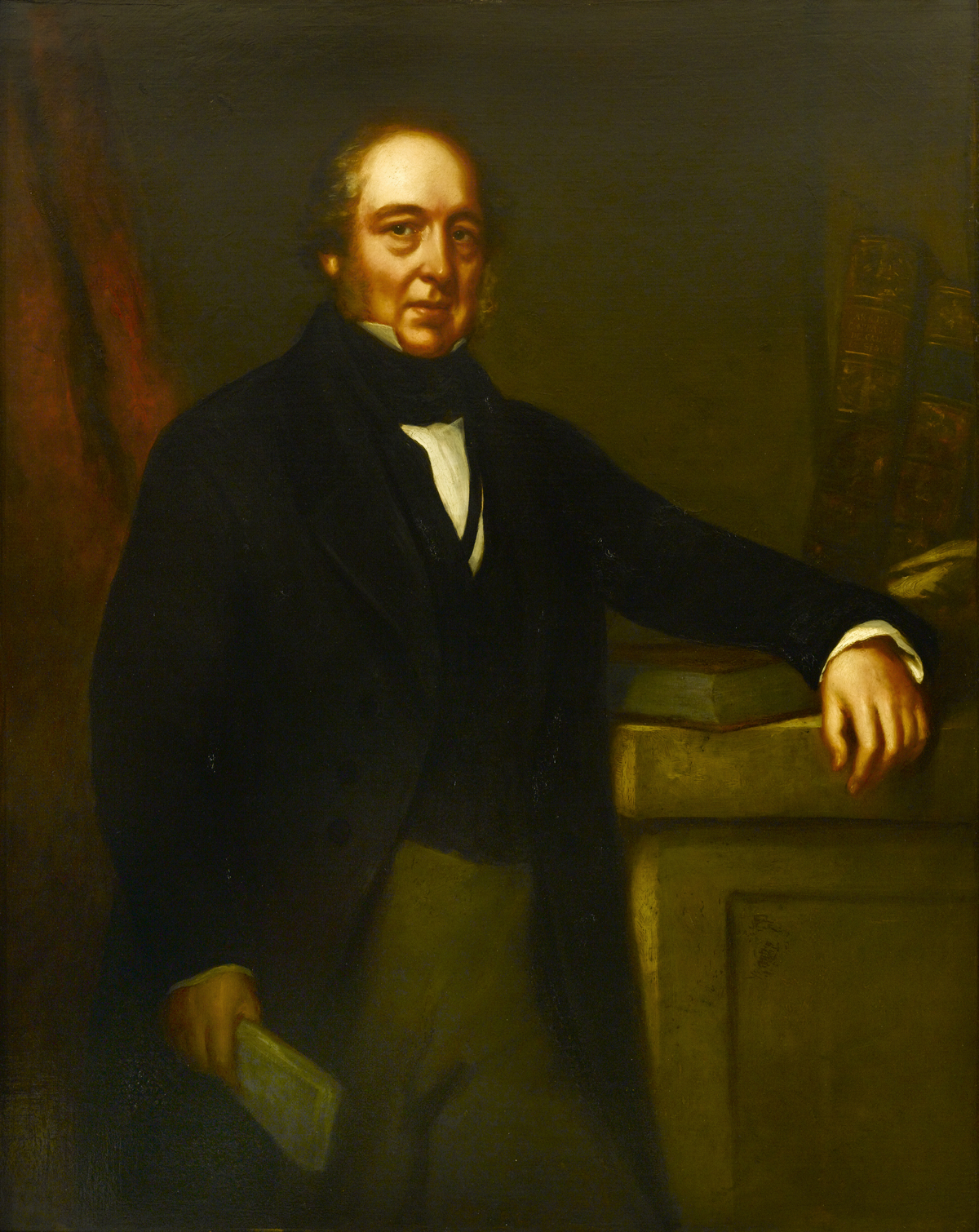
No date - Clement Hue (ca.1779-1861)

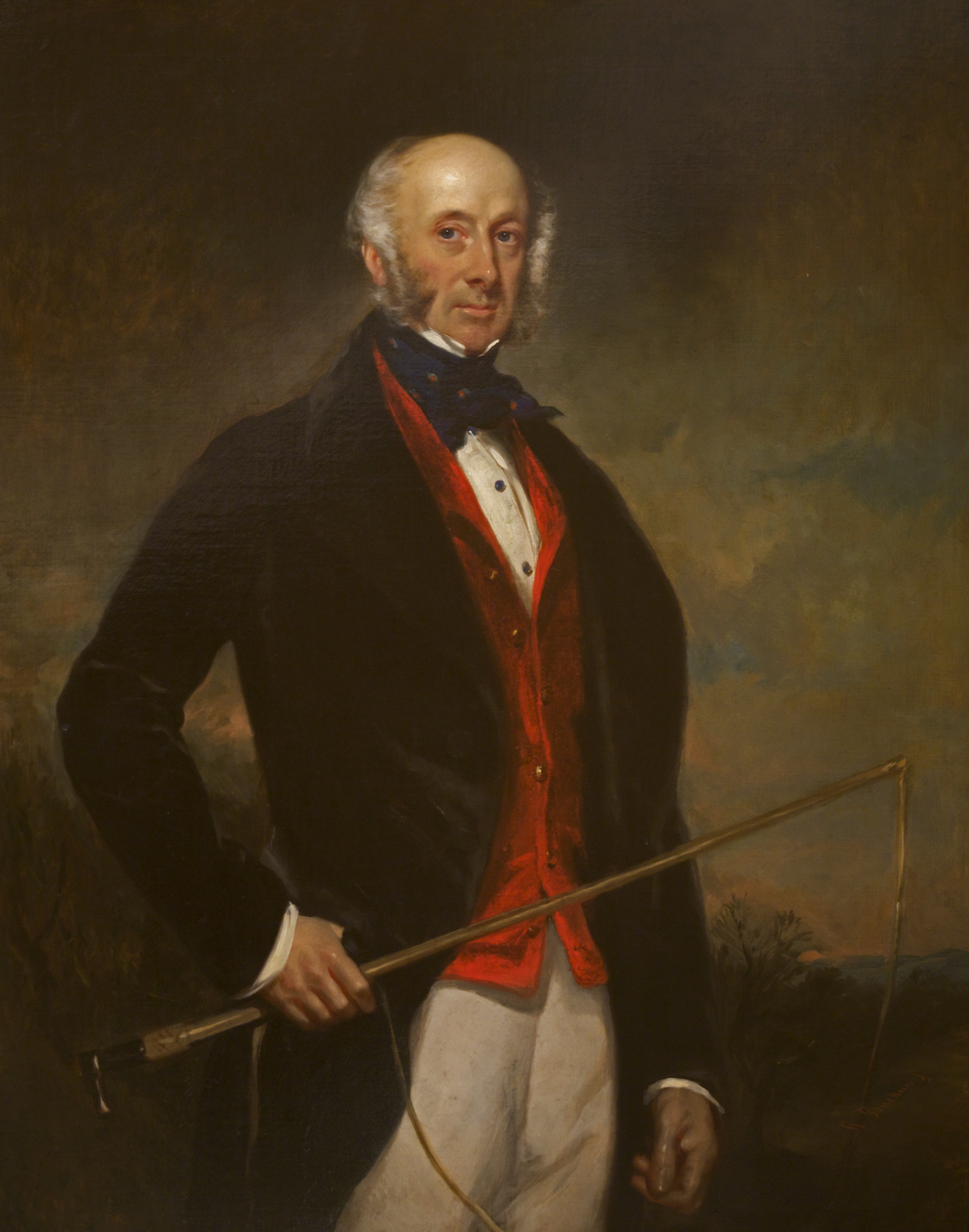
No date Sir Charles Morgan, 1st Baron Tredegar (1792 - 1875)
