= Buckner, Texas =

- Unincorporated community
- Location within Texas Location within the United States
- Coordinates: 33°13′03″N 96°39′49″W
- Country: United States
- State: Texas
- County: Collin
- Elevation: 659 ft (201 m)
- Time zone: UTC-6 (Central (CST))
  - Summer (DST): UTC-5 (CDT)
- GNIS feature ID: 1378065

Buckner is an unincorporated community in Collin County, located in the U.S. state of Texas. It is located within the Dallas-Fort Worth Metroplex and is inside the McKinney city limits.

== History ==
Collin County's first county seat was Buckner. John McGarrah arrived from Arkansas in the early 1840s to claim a headright of 640 acres (260 ha), marking the beginning of settlement. In the middle of the 1840s, as the number of settlers increased, McGarrah established a trading station to accommodate them and gave 50 acres (20 ha) of property for a townsite. A blacksmith shop was later constructed next to the store. The Texas Legislature created Collin County on April 3, 1846, and named a five-member commission to choose two locations within three miles of the county's center and oversee an election to designate one of the locations—to be called Buckner—as the county seat. A conference that was most likely conducted at McGarrah's store on Independence Day in 1846 was attended by roughly 75 people, who decided to designate that location as the county seat. The town got a post office in 1846. The state legislature asked for a fresh election in 1848 because Buckner was not within three miles of the county center and because two locations had not been presented to the voters in the 1846 election. McKinney was selected to be the new county seat. After mail service to Buckner was cut off in May 1848, the town's citizens and businesses relocated to McKinney a year later. Collin County's first county seat was abandoned by the early 1850s. However, due to the influence of a nearby Texas Instruments company and a "Third Monday Trade Day" at the site, activities in the Buckner region picked back up in the 1980s.

== Geography ==
Buckner was located 3 mi (4.8 km) northwest of McKinney, but is now within the city limits.

== Education ==
Today the community is served by the McKinney Independent School District. It is zoned for Lizzie Nell Cundiff McClure Elementary School, Scott Morgan Johnson Middle School, and McKinney North High School.
