= Segun Bucknor =

Nigerian musician and journalist (1946–2017)

- Born: 29 March 1946; Lagos, Colony and Protectorate of Nigeria
- Died: 11 August 2017 (aged 71); Lagos, Nigeria
- Education: King's College, Lagos; Columbia University
- Occupations: Musician, journalist
- Years active: 1964–2000s
- Spouse: Sola Bucknor (until his death)
- Children: Funke Bucknor-Obruthe; Tosyn Bucknor
- Musical career
- Genres: Soul, Pop, Funk, Groove
- Instruments: Piano, guitar
- Labels: Vampi Soul, Premier Records LTD, Afrodisia

Segun Bucknor (29 March 1946 – 11 August 2017) was a Nigerian musician and journalist active during the 1960s and 1970s. He was a pianist and guitarist specializing in genres ranging from soul music to pop music and to funk. Through their brief career, Segun Bucknor and the Assembly released a variety of music dealing with Nigerian culture or political influence which was described by the BBC as an "interesting slice of Nigerian pop music history and culture".

Bucknor was the father of media personality Tosyn Bucknor and businesswoman Funke Bucknor-Obruthe.

== Early life ==
Segun Bucknor was born in Lagos on 29 March 1946. He was educated at King's College and Columbia University, New York. He was a member of the school's band and choir. He started out playing the tin whistle as a junior band member but later graduated to learning the guitar and piano. During this time, he apprenticed under Roy Chicago's band.

== Career ==
In 1964, Bucknor was a member of a newly formed band, the Hot Four. He was the band's organist and lead guitar player; other members were Mike Nelson Cole, the band leader and Sunmi Smart Cole, the drummer. The group played regularly in Lagos clubs such as Surulere night club. However, Bucknor travelled to the United States to study for a couple of years. During his time in the United States, he was influenced by Ray Charles. After his return to Nigeria in 1968, the band received funding from a trio of investors and upon the exit of Mike Nelson Cole, Bucknor became the band leader.

In 1969, the name of the band became Segun Bucknor and the Assembly. The group recorded soul songs including "Lord Give Me Soul" and "I Will Love You No Matter How". Gradually the group migrated from soul songs to a style of afrobeat; in performance a dancing trio called the Sweet Things was included.

Bucknor was known for establishing politics into his music. In 1970, the band released "Son of 15 January", The Son of 15 January treating the assassination of Abubakar Tafawa Balewa, which occurred on 15 January 1966. In the 1970s, the band released more politically charged songs – "Sorrow, Sorrow, Sorrow", "Poor Man No Get Brother" – before its popularity began to slip around the mid-1970s. Bucknor retired from music after receiving threats due to his political views.

After Segun Bucknor and the Assembly disbanded in 1975, Bucknor dedicated his time to journalism. He wrote about political corruption, the same concept as during his musical career.

Bucknor kept a low profile during the 1980s and 1990s due to low popularity and wanting to focus on his family. He made rare musical appearances at cafes during the early 2000s. In recent years, he was kept out of the public by poor health. He made a few broadcasts on his daughter Tosyn Bucknor's social media account.

In 2002, the BBC published a review covering Bucknor's career from 1969 through 1975. It praises Bucknor's "reissue of various recordings made from 1969 to 1975 [which] represents an interesting slice of Nigerian pop music history and culture".

=== Style ===
Bucknor was noted for switching between singing and shouting from singing alone, floating above every instrument, or in a clear loud voice. The drums, percussion, guitar, bass, keys and horns would be accessories to his vocals. The progression of his sound is more circular and rhythmic, floating around you, and dancing would be involved in his music. His lyrics were in English and Yoruba.

== Personal life ==
Bucknor was married to Sola Bucknor until his death in 2017. Together, they had two children: Tosyn Bucknor, a media personality, and Funke Bucknor-Obruthe, a businesswoman.

Bucknor died in Lagos early on 11 August 2017 after multiple strokes, at the age of 71. His death was announced by his daughter Funke on Facebook. He also had hypertension and diabetes.
