= Tosyn Bucknor =

Nigerian media personality (1981–2018)

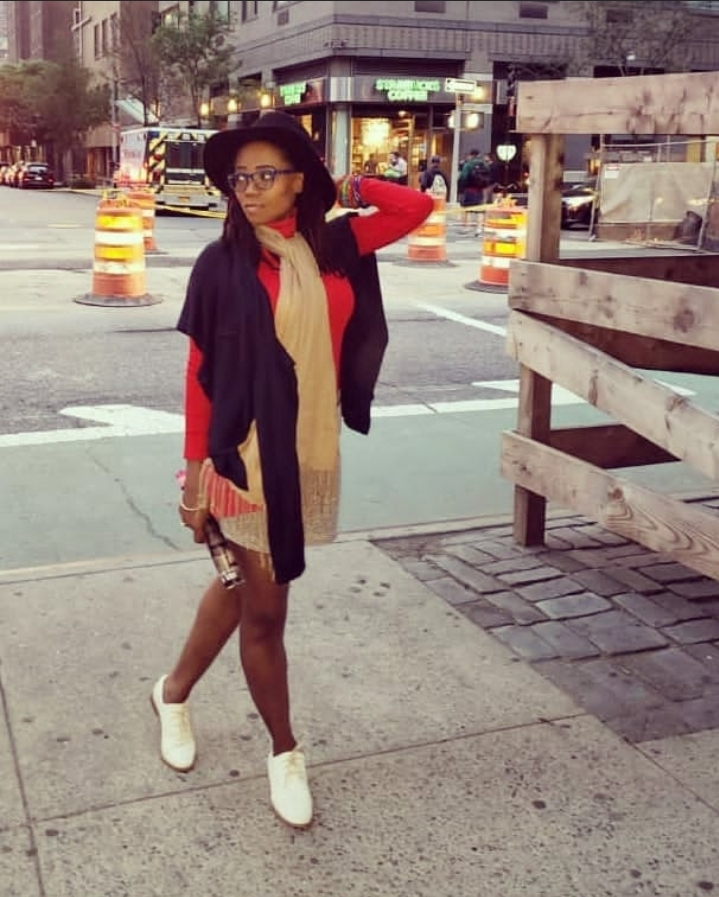
- Tosyn on holiday
- Born: Oluwatosin Bucknor; 15 August 1981; Lagos State, Nigeria
- Died: 19 November 2018 (aged 37); Lagos, Nigeria
- Other names: Area Boss, T-Buck, Tosyn
- Occupations: Media personality Actress; Singer-songwriter
- Years active: 2009–2018

Oluwatosin "Tosyn" Bucknor (15 August 1981 – 19 November 2018) was a Nigerian writer, singer-songwriter, radio and television host, social media content creator and a Vlogger who died of sickle cell anaemia. Until her death, she worked with Inspiration FM as a journalist and also ran ‘These Genes Project’ to help people with sickle cell anaemia.

== Early life and education ==
Tosyn was born to Sola Bucknor and Segun Bucknor, a musician, in a cab on 15 August 1981. She was sister to Funke Bucknor, CEO of Zapphaire Events. Tosyn attended Fountain Nursery and Primary School, Queens' College Yaba, University of Lagos (LLB) and the Nigerian Law School, Lagos Campus (BL). She did her National Youth Service Corps at Port Harcourt, opting to teach Literature-In-English and English at Archdeacon Crowther Memorial Girls' School, Elelenwo.

== Career ==
=== Radio ===
Radio for Tosyn started with Tee A on Eko 89.7FM after which she interned at Cool FM Nigeria where she hosted the Fun Hour Show on Saturdays. In 2009, Tosyn joined Top Radio 90.9 FM where she hosted the morning show, "Top Of The Morning" until 2017. She was the only female radio host handling the morning belt by herself. In 2018, Tosyn moved to join Inspiration FM, Lagos where she was until she passed. Apart from Radio, Tosyn was an avid podcaster. She created "OAP 101" for aspiring media personalities.

=== Music ===
Tosyn was a singer-songwriter with one album ('Pop Rock Soul and Jara'). Two of her songs have been used as soundtracks for the short film "Ireti". Tosyn wrote, sang, recorded and performed music as CON.tra.diction. As a recording artist and singer-songwriter, she has worked with artists like Skales, Rooftop MCs and Eva, as well as producers like Sess, Tintin, Coldflames, Dj Klem, Knighthouse, Micworx and Cobhams.

==== Music credits ====
– Performed at Naijazz, Laff and Jamz, Swe Hip hop Valentine, Muson Jazz Festival, Trip City and Friends, My Groovy Valentine, Wax Lyrical, Inspiration Fm Family Festival, Fashion Show at Rehab, One Soul's Album Launch, Music For Soul at Ember Creek, Koffi's Green Zone at Unilag, ONE MIC NAIJA.

– Contributed a verse to the voter's awareness song organised by '1 Thumb'

– CON.tra.diction did a cameo of 'Sorry Song' on Plumbline's video "Dead presidents"

– Featured on Micworx Music E-mixes mixtape alongside Darey, Asa, Goldie and others

Tosyn also ran ONE MIC NAIJA with Moyo Shomade & Osagie Okunkpolor. One Mic Naija is a concert dedicated to getting new and established acts on the same stage.

=== Television ===
Bucknor hosted 'Tosyn's Buzz Live' on Pulse TV every Friday. Her television and acting credits include:

- Co-host 3Live Chicks with Oreka Godis and Toke Makinwa (a TV and YouTube show)
- Television Correspondent for EbonyLife Television
- Guest judge on Naija Sings Season 1
- Guest judge on Project Fame West Africa Season 5
- Judge on Boost Freestyle Reality Show Season 2
- Mentor on Project Fame West Africa Season 2
- Mentor on Project Fame West Africa Season 5
- Judge on God's Kids Great Talent, City Of David, Redeemed Christian Church of God. 2012
- Judge on Greensprings Pastoral Centre Talent Show (PC's Got Talent), Greensprings School, Lekki. 2012
- Plays "Osa" on TINSEL, a Mnet soap opera
- The Survivor Show with DJ Neptune as Host DJ
- Played 'Jola' on 'Plus 234', a television drama series
- She was the brain behind the 'One Mic Naija" project

=== Writing credits ===
Tosyn contributed to several websites, including her own blogs, and wrote for television. Her writing credits include (but not limited to):

- Series writer, '5ve' television series
- Series writer, 'Apprentice Africa'
- Series writer, 'Xtraconnect Gameshow'
- Columnist for the Guardian on Sundays for the column, 'Strictly for the Young'
- Columnist for Wedding Planner Magazine
- Columnist for Exquisite Magazine
- Series writer and Content Producer, 'Nigeria's Got Talent' Season 1
- Columnist for The Net NG (Tosyn's ten 10s)
- Series contributor, "My Mum and I"
- Series contributor, "Citi Sistas"
- Series contributor, "About to Wed"
- Writer Amstel Malta Box Office (seasons 2 to 5) and Voice Over narrator for Season 5
- Website writer for Gulder Ultimate Search Season 3

== Personal life ==
Tosyn married her French boyfriend Aurélien Boyer on 15 November 2015 at Landmark Events Centre, Oniru. She publicly maintained close friendships with Lamide Akintobi Gbemi Olateru-Olagbegi and Lala Akindoju.

== Death ==
Tosyn was found dead by her husband, Aurelien Boyer, when he arrived at home from work on 19 November 2018. Her sister, Funke Bucknor Obruthe said through her instagram account that Tosyn died due to sickle cell complications. She was born with sickle cell anaemia. Following her death, a poem she had written a few days before her death surfaced online, where she apparently predicted her death.

== Recognitions and awards ==
- Nominee, Women in Media Awards 2009
- Nominee, Exquisite Lady of the Year Award 2009, 2010, 2011
- Nominee, Future Awards, Best Use of Goodwill 2009
- Nominee, Dynamix Awards, Radio Personality of the Year 2009, 2011
- Nominee, Future Awards, On-Air Personality of the Year, Radio 2010
- Nominee, FAB Awards, On-Air Personality, Radio 2011, 2012
- Nominee, Dynamix Awards Best Radio Personality 2011
- Nominee, Nickelodeon Kids Choice Awards, Favourite On-Air Personality (Nigeria) 2015
- Nominee, OAP of the Year, SCREAM Awards 2016
- Nominee, Most Fashionable On-Air Personality, Lagos Fashion Awards 2016
- Winner, Best of Nollywood Awards, Radio Host of the Year
- Winner, Tweet Rave Awards, Most Innovative Tweets
- Winner, Jeans 4 Genes II, Best charity/cause-related event at Nigerian Events Award
- Winner, Nigerian Broadcasters Awards: Most Popular Radio Presenter
- As CON.tra.diction, Tosyn was nominated at the NMVA Awards 2010 in the Best Rock Video category
- Tosyn was inducted into the Humanitarian Hall of Fame by Charity Lounge, Lagos for her 'Act of Kindness' 2012
