= Tim Bückner =

German politician (born 1983)

Member of the Landtag of Baden-Württemberg
- Incumbent
- Assumed office 11 May 2021
- Constituency: Schwäbisch Gmünd

Personal details
- Born: 20 October 1983 (age 42)
- Party: Christian Democratic Union

Tim Bückner (born 20 October 1983) is a German politician serving as a member of the Landtag of Baden-Württemberg since 2021. Until 2021, he served as managing director of the Christian Democratic Union in the Ostalbkreis.
