= Funke Bucknor-Obruthe =

Nigerian entrepreneur and lawyer

- Born: Funke Bucknor; 27 June 1976 (age 50); Lagos State, Nigeria
- Education: University of Lagos; Nigerian Law School
- Occupations: Event planner; entrepreneur; lawyer
- Years active: 2003–present
- Title: CEO of Zapphaire Events
- Spouse: Onome Obruthe
- Children: 2
- Parent: Segun Bucknor
- Relatives: Tosyn Bucknor

Funke Bucknor-Obruthe (born 27 June 1976) is a Nigerian entrepreneur and lawyer. She is an event planner and the founder and CEO of Zapphaire Events.

== Early life and education ==
Bucknor-Obruthe was born to Segun and Shola Bucknor in Lagos State, Southwestern Nigeria. She began her basic and secondary school education at Fountain Nursery and Primary School, Lagos, and Nigeria Navy Secondary School, Lagos, before she proceeded to study Law at the University of Lagos. In 2000, she was called to bar after attending the Nigerian Law School in Abuja.

== Career ==
After practising law briefly, Bucknor-Obruthe was employed at Tie Communications, an advertisement agency, where she worked for a short period.

In 2003, she started an events planning company called Zapphaire Events. She was involved with planning a royal wedding in Nigeria.

She received the Future Award for "Entrepreneur of the Year" (2006), the Wedding Planner Magazine Award for "Wedding Planner of the Year" (2007), Go2girl Life Achievement Awards (2011), Nigerian Events Awards for Outstanding Contribution to the Events Industry (2012).

== Books ==
- The Essential Bridal Handbook

== Recognitions ==
In 2014, Nigerian online magazine YNaija listed Bucknor-Obruthe in its "10 Most Powerful Under-40s in Business". In 2016, she was listed in the BBC's 100 Women series.

== Personal life ==
Bucknor-Obruthe is married to Onome Obruthe, with whom she has two children. She is the elder sister of the late Nigerian media personality Tosyn Bucknor.
