= Kadiatou Konaté =

Malian film director and screenwriter

- Born: Bamako, Mali
- Education: Cheikh Anta Diop University
- Occupations: Film director, screenwriter

Kadiatou Konaté is a Malian film director and screenwriter. Her most notable work is L'Enfant terrible, an animated short based on African myths. She has also produced several documentaries, often focusing on the issues of women and children in Mali.

== Personal history ==
Konaté was born in Bamako, Mali. Her family, the Konates, were royalty that had once belonged to the Gbara of Old Mali.

She was educated at Cheikh Anta Diop University.

In 2023, an impressive meeting chaired by the former First Lady of South Africa and Mozambique Graça Machel was held at the Centre for the Book in Cape Town. Four of that year's BBC 100 women, Michelle Obama, Melinda French Gates, Ulanda Mtamba and Amal Clooney took part. They were joined by Kadiatou Konaté, Tanzanian Rebeca Gyumi, Liberian Lakshmi Moore, Malawian Memory Banda, representatives of the Women Lawyers Association of Malawi and Faith Mwangi-Powell of Girls Not Brides. They discussed the problem of girls' education and child marriage.

== Film career ==
After leaving university, Konaté worked as a member of the crew on Souleymane Cissé's 1985 classic film Yeelen. In 1989 she wrote the screenplay for the short animated film La Geste de Ségou, directed by fellow Malian Mambaye Coulibaly. Her first credited solo work is listed as the documentary Des Yeux Pour Pleurer (Crying Eyes), shot on video in 1992. Konaté followed this with a second documentary, also shot on video, Circulation Routiere (Traffic), co-directed with Kabide Djedje. In 1993 she produced three short films, the most notable of which was L'Enfant terrible (The Terrible Child), co-produced with the Belgian workshop Graphoui. L'Enfant terrible, which is based upon a Central African myth, is, like La Geste de Ségou, an animated story that used puppets. It follows a benevolent spirit, a child which is born with teeth and the ability to talk and walk, who finds its older brother and begins an unusual journey. It remains her most highly acclaimed work.

Konaté followed her short films by returning to documentaries, releasing Femmes et Développement in 1995. Femmes et Développement makes comparison between women in Mali from different socioeconomic groups. The film looks at what has been accomplished by women in her country and what still needs to be accomplished. In 1998 she directed Un mineur en milieu carcéral, a short documentary which explored the plight of children who have been incarcerated, often for minor offenses.

Her 2008 documentary Daman Da (Yellow Mirage), follows the day-to-day lives of gold miners in Mali. She was drawn to the topic after watching a local news report on the subject. The film showed the difficulties faced by the miners, working in crude conditions, but also the honesty and work ethic they displayed.

== Filmography ==
=== Writer ===
- La Geste de Ségou (1989)

=== Director ===
- Des Yeux Pour Pleurer (1992) - Documentary
- Circulation Routiere (1993) - Documentary
- L'Enfant terrible (1993)
- L'enfant et l'hygiène corporelle (1993)
- L'enfant et la circulation routière (1993)
- Femmes et Développement (1995)
- Un mineur en milieu carcéral (1998)
- Petit à petit (2001)
- Daman da (2008)
