= Centre for the Book =

Centre in Cape Town to promote literacy, reading, and publishing

The Centre for the Book
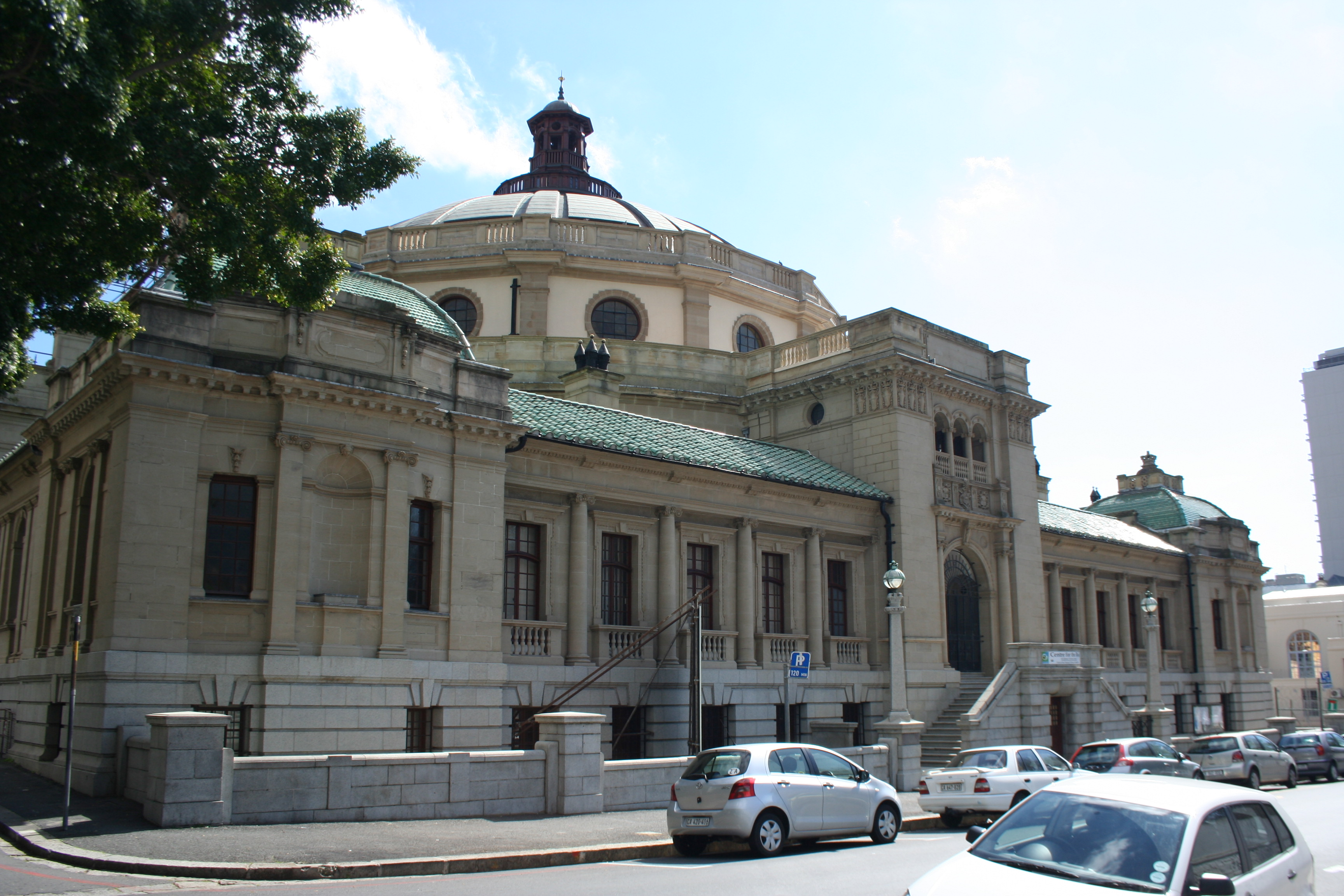
- Exterior
- Interactive map of the The Centre for the Book area

General information
- Architectural style: Edwardian style
- Location: Cape Town, South Africa
- Coordinates: 33.9271728°S 18.4158362°E
- Construction started: 1913

Height
- Architectural: W. Hawke and W.N. McKinlay

The Centre for the Book is a building situated next to the Company's Gardens in Cape Town. The building is run for the state by an independent organization of the same name, to promote literacy, reading, publishing and for conferences, symposia, training courses and exhibitions pertaining to these.

== History ==
The building opened in 1913, and was originally built with money donated by Willem Hiddingh and Donald Currie and was to be the headquarters of the then University of the Cape of Good Hope, today known as the University of South Africa, as an examination centre for colleges such as Victoria College, Stellenbosch, South African College and others, who are today universities in their own right.

In 1932, University of South Africa moved to rented premises in Pretoria. The building was sold to the state, to be the home of the National Archives of South Africa, and an elevator and fire detection system was installed.

In 1987, the building was offered to the South African Library, which planned to house some of its special collections there, as the Archives planned to relocate to new premises. In February 1990, the Archives moved to out and by this time the building was in a state of serious disrepair with crumbling stonework and major damage to the roofs. During this year the building was proclaimed a National Monument.

A leading restoration consultant, John Rennie, was appointed to tend to the building with a limited budget. The elevator is a custom design, as it opens in three directions with separate doors as necessitated by the design of the building.

In 2023 an impressive meeting chaired by the former First Lady of South Africa and Mozambique Graça Machel was held here. Four of that year's BBC 100 women, Michelle Obama, Melinda French Gates, Ulanda Mtamba and Amal Clooney took part. They were joined by Tanzanian Rebeca Gyumi, Liberian Lakshmi Moore, Malian film director Kadiatou Konaté, Malawian Memory Banda, representatives of the Women Lawyers Association of Malawi and Faith Mwangi-Powell of Girls Not Brides. They discussed the problem of girls' education of child marriage.

== Architecture ==
The building is built in the Edwardian style. Two British architects, W. Hawke and W.N. McKinlay, won a competition for its design and moved to South Africa to oversee its construction. The architects moved on to contribute to the design of the Union Buildings.
