= Al Conti =

Argentine composer (born 1968)

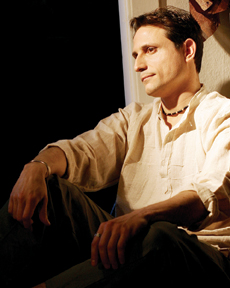

Background information
- Born: March 9, 1968 (age 58)
- Origin: Buenos Aires, Argentina
- Genres: Contemporary instrumental, new-age
- Occupations: Composer; Pianist; Arranger
- Instruments: Piano, keyboards
- Years active: 2005 –2019
- Label: Shadowside Music
- Website: www.alconti.net

Al Conti (born March 9, 1968) is a Grammy-nominated New Age composer, arranger, producer, and multi-instrumentalist.

== Biography ==
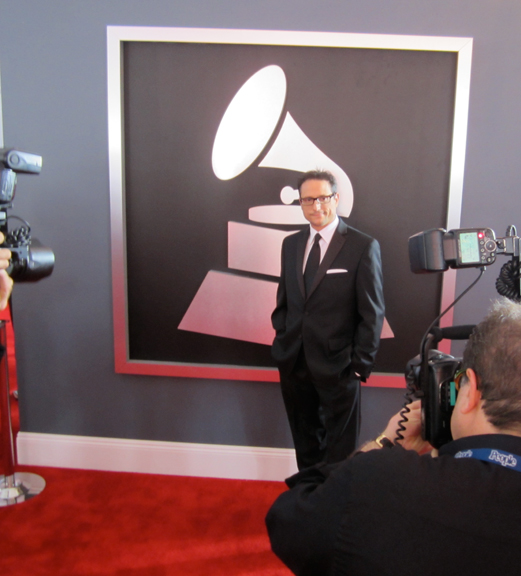
Al conti arrives at the 2012 54th Grammy Awards

Al Conti is Argentine-born and currently resides in the United States. Since 2006, Conti has led an impressive music career achieving various mentions, awards and a Grammy nomination. Mystic (2016), his latest album, includes collaborations from Ricky Kej, Pamela Copus (2002), Jeff Pearce and Charlee Brooks. Other notable album credits include violins from award winner Manoj George and engineers Randy Copus (2002), Jill Tengan (Britney Spears, Patsy Cline, Randy Edelman, Pimpinela, Patricia Sosa, Daniela Romo) and Vanil Veigas (Ricky Kej, Al Jewer, Jeff Oster, Kathy Sanborn, Wouter Kellerman). "Mystic" entered the Zone Music Reporter's Top 100 Chart in the number 1 position in October 2016.

Conti's 2013 album, The Blue Rose, immediately rose to the top #1 spot on the Zone Music Reporter (ZMR) Top 100 chart for May and June 2014. The album also reached #3 on the ZMR Top 100 Airplay Chart for 2013. His album Northern Seas garnered a Grammy nomination, made Amazon's Top 10 list for Best New Age Albums of 2010 and reached #2 in the Zone Music Reporter's Top 100 chart for October 2010. His album Scheherazade topped the Zone Music Reporter Top 100 Chart at number 1 for three consecutive months, in October, November and December, 2008. The album also garnered four ZMR Lifestyle Music Awards nominations, including Album of the Year, and won Best World Album of 2008. Scheherazade also headed many radios 'Top 10' and 'Best of' lists,' as well as charting #5 on the ZMR's Top 100 Airplay Chart for 2008. His album Poeta was used as part of NPR's fundraising efforts in 2007 and his recording 'Quest for Orpheus,' from the same album, received a “Best of 2007” Award from Mystic Soundscapes Radio.

In 2008, Al Conti joined Kevin Bacon, Jessica Alba, Will & Grace's Shelley Morrison and other celebrities lending their names to Until There's a Cure to help raise funds for HIV/AIDS awareness and research. Conti is also a member of Artists for Human Rights, an organization founded by actress Anne Archer.

Conti has traveled widely and has lived in South America, Europe, and the United States. As an actor, he has appeared on television shows including the CBS daytime drama “As the World Turns,” in films, in numerous radio and television commercials, and on-stage in theatre productions in cities including New York City, Philadelphia, Tampa and Buenos Aires. Born and raised in Argentina, Conti comes from a family of artists in many fields. Al's family tree also includes the famous Argentinean writer and politician Miguel Cané, who held numerous political offices, notably as Argentine minister of external affairs and of the Interior and Mayor of the City of Buenos Aires.

== Discography ==
- 2006 - Shadows (Shadowside Music)
- 2007 - Poeta (Shadowside Music)
- 2008 - Scheherazade (Shadowside Music)
- 2010 - Northern Seas (Shadowside Music)
- 2013 - The Blue Rose (Shadowside Music)
- 2016 - Mystic (Shadowside Music)

== Personal life ==
Conti is openly gay, confirming this in a radio interview in May 2012 when asked about personal relationships: "I have a partner who is very supportive of my work. I think this is the first time that I actually mention that I have a partner and that he is a man." He added that he maintains his privacy and never feels a need to speak of his personal life, adding, "I really never gave it a thought, I thought, you know, my music needs to speak for itself."

In 2015, Al married Kevin, his longtime partner and manager. They make their home in the Hudson Valley and Manhattan, New York City with Digby, their adopted dog.

Al credits the late Bobby Susser as his mentor and dear friend, and Alison Arngrim, of Little House on the Prairie fame, for her partial guidance in coming out.

As of 2019, Al Conti has retired from the music business, in an official statement made by him in 2020.
