= Ulanda Mtamba =

Malawian campaigner for education

- in 2025
- Occupations: Rotary President and campaigner for improving the education of women
- Employer: AGE Africa
- Known for: one of the BBC's 100 women in 2023

Ulanda Mtamba is a Malawian campaigner for education who is against child marriage. She became a President of Rotary International in Limbe and named on the BBC's 100 Women list as one of the world's inspiring and influential women in 2023. She was the country director of Advancing Girls Education in Africa (AGE Africa). 9% of girls in Malawi were married by the age of fifteen in 2022.

== Life ==
Mtamba was raised in Tsabango in Lilongwe. In her community, girls frequently leave education for marriage. She is a campaigner for education, and she is against child marriage.

Mtamba has worked to improve the lives of people living with AIDS since 2003. In 2018 she was a fellow of the New York-based AIDS Vaccine Advocacy Coalition. In 2019 she joined Rotary International. She was an advocate for increased AIDS protection for women. She highlighted the intravaginal silicone ring which decreased their chance of infection by about a half.

She became the country director of Advancing Girls Education in Africa (AGE Africa). AGE Africa is an American non-profit started in 2005 by Xanthe Scharff to fund African girls' education. Scharff has retired as the catalyst of the organisation and Mtamba leads in Malawi assisted by at least one woman who has successfully followed the difficult route to educate herself while funded by AGE. There are few jobs and peer pressure tempts girls who have begun funded education back to being a wife. Mtamba and AGE Africa ran an annual retreat in Zomba where they invited 100 girls from a number of different schools. In one year, she and Grace Kwelepeta who is the Member of Parliament for Zomba Malosa encouraged and inspired the girls to not just look for a job, but to become entrepreneurs to create jobs. They were told to prioritise study over romance.

Mtamba became the President of Limbe's Rotary International club in 2023. She was the first woman to serve in that role in Limbe. Her club announced the completion of three years work to manage the watershed in the Machinga District. Her club had led the work and it will improve the lives of 2,500 people.

She became one of the thirteen African women named as part of the BBC's 100 Women in 2023. Three of the other BBC 100 women visited her area as they were also concerned about the education of girls in Malawi. Michelle Obama, Melinda French Gates, and Amal Clooney visited a Malawian secondary school in November 2023. Obama said that she had heard of the work done in supporting girls education and that her foundation had funded AGE Africa since 2018. Accounts of the visit included quotes from all four of the BBC 100 women. Mtamba, as the country director for AGE Africa, noted that the visit of the other three showed the importance of their work.

Mtamba went on with those three to a meeting at the Centre for the Book in South Africa chaired by the former First Lady of South Africa and Mozambique Graça Machel. They, Tanzanian Rebeca Gyumi, Liberian Lakshmi Moore, Malian film director Kadiatou Konaté, Malawian Memory Banda, representatives of the Women Lawyers Association of Malawi and Faith Mwangi-Powell of Girls Not Brides discussed the visit and the problem of child marriage.

Mtamba is among the 100 Inspiring Women 2024 Season II by Wealth Woman Magazine in Malawi. Mtamba speaks out about child marriage noting that most girls are married before they are eighteen and ten per cent of girls marry before the age of fifteen.
