= Joseline Esteffanía Velásquez Morales =

Guatemalan activist

Joseline Esteffanía Velásquez Morales is a Guatemalan activist and coordinator of several Non-Governmental organizations (NGOs).

Velásquez is a campaigner for women's sexual and reproductive rights and the feminist movement. She currently helps through NGOs; Go Joven Guatemala, Girls Not Brides and Fondo CAMY to educate girls and young women in Guatemalan communities on issues of sexuality and pregnancy prevention. She also fights to end forced marriages in Guatemala and unwanted pregnancies.

In 2018, Velásquez was listed as one of BBC's 100 Women.
