= Karisi =

Epic poetry genre of the Nyanga people of the African Great Lakes

Karisi is the name given by the Nyanga people (of the African Great Lakes) to oral poems of epic length. It is one of a number of oral genres recognized by the Nyanga; the best known karisi is the Mwindo epic, sometimes called the national epic of the Nyanga.

Like similar genres from nearby cultures, the karisi has an anthropomorphic hero at the center, and the performance is intricate and complex, involving many characters interacting with the central character, and involves "dancing, singing, chanting, costuming ..., playing musical instruments, mimicry, screaming, praise giving, gift giving, and food and beverage distributions". The origins of the genre may lie among a religious rite linked to the Pygmy peoples.
