= Enfant terrible (folklore) =

Mythical figure

The enfant terrible (pl.: enfants terribles) is a character appearing in the tales and myths of many cultures of West and Central Africa, mainly among the traditions of the Bambara and Madinka. Recognizable by unusual birth circumstances and precocious abilities, enfants terribles are known for transgressive behavior—often destructive or suicidal—that leave societies from which they spawned helpless to stop them. Depending on circumstances, they may ultimately return to the divine world or change into benevolent powers.

== In the West African oral literature ==
In oral tales and myths in West Africa, the enfant terrible can be a single character or one of a set of twins. It can appear as either a boy or girl. It is always characterized by a peculiar birth, it may be a twin (often the younger of the two) or simply a child prodigy whose gestation has been unordinary. In some stories, the enfant terrible has all its teeth at birth, is immediately able to talk and walk and in some stories is able to give themselves a name. In societies practicing circumcision and/or excision, the enfant terrible is also characterized as uncircumcised. In Bambara traditions, enfants terribles carry recognizable attributes of clothing such as shells or bracelets, and they are attached to the world of the bush where they are considered protected by spirits.

The two other major characteristics of enfants terribles are their terrible supernatural force and unusual behavior, often eccentric or evil; they are sometimes themselves the victims. They are often destructive towards the paternal family, will attack their family and friends and will break with traditions, customs and morals. Their behavior sometimes borders on suicidal (sawing off the branch on which they are sitting).

In some stories, the history of the enfant terrible is connected to the myths of the land. The child will sometimes metamorphose into lightning or rain to ascend to heaven. In others, they become ultimately beneficial, slaying a dragon that devastated the region or defeating a bird that stole the sun. Stories featuring an enfant terrible include Mwindo from the Congolese oral epic; Akoma Mba, the hero of a story from the Fang clan of the Beti-Pahuin peoples; and Deng, a Sudanese and Malawian rain god.

== Analysis ==
Jacques Chevrier emphasizes the singularity of such "terrible children" in West African culture, despite what the phrase "enfant terrible" can evoke among European readers. He explores how the enfant terrible, though initially seen as a destructive and malevolent figure, can often become the savior. This paradox is explained by the fact that the enfant terrible is from the non-human or divine world and that their actions, no matter how absurd, must be interpreted as signs of superior knowledge.

== In the arts ==
In Ize-Gani tale, published by the Nigerian writer Boubou Hama in 1985, Ize-Gani, the main character of the story, is a terrible child who gradually becomes a benevolent figure.

L'Enfant terrible, a short animated film by Malawian director Kadiatou Konaté, features an enfant terrible.

== Bibliography ==
- Chevrier, Jacques (2005). L'Arbre à palabres. Essai sur les contes et récits traditionnels d'Afrique noire. Paris: Hatier. ISBN 978-2-7473-0453-5.
- Görög, Veronika; Platiel, Suzanne; Rey-Hulman, Diana; Seydou, Christiane (1980). Histoires d'enfants terribles. Paris: Maisonneuve et Larose. ISBN 2-7068-0788-1.
