= AIDS Vaccine Advocacy Coalition =

American nonprofit organization

Aids Vaccine Advocacy Coalition Inc
- Abbreviation: AVAC
- Formation: Tax-exempt since April 1997; 29 years ago
- Type: 501(c)(3)
- Tax ID no.: EIN: 943240841
- Headquarters: New York City
- Revenue: 10,029,156 USD (2024)
- Expenses: 13,791,130 USD (2024)
- Website: avac.org

AVAC is a New York City-based international non-profit community- and consumer-based organization working to accelerate ethical development and delivery of AIDS vaccines and other HIV prevention options to populations throughout the world.

== History ==
Founded in 1995, AVAC uses public education, policy analysis, advocacy and Community Mobilization to accelerate a response to the epidemic. AVAC's goal is to involve affected populations in work to promote the ethical introduction and distribution of life-saving HIV/AIDS technologies such as vaccines and microbicides. AVAC works to provide independent analysis, policy advocacy, public education and mobilisation to enhance AIDS vaccine research and development.

In 2023 AVACs Country Director in Malawi, Ulanda Mtamba was recognised as one of the BBC 100 Women.

== Funders ==
Funders have included:

- The Bill and Melinda Gates Foundation,
- Ford Foundation
- International AIDS Vaccine Initiative
- Until There's a Cure Foundation
- Broadway Cares/Equity Fights AIDS
- Gill Foundation
- Overbrook Foundation
- USAID
- The Children's Investment Fund Foundation
- Combined Federal Campaign
- FHI 360
- UNAIDS
- Mac AIDS Fund
