= Girls Empowerment Network =

Malawian non-governmental organization

Girls Empowerment Network, also known as GENET, is a non-governmental organization based in Blantyre, Malawi, that advocates for the rights and empowerment of adolescent girls and young women. The organization works on issues of gender equality, child marriage, sexual and reproductive health and rights (SRHR), and climate justice. Girls Empowerment Network is a member of Girls Not Brides global partnership.

== History ==
GENET was founded in 2008 and registered as a non governmental organization in September 2008 by a group of young Malawian feminists who sought to address systemic inequalities affecting girls in education, health, and leadership. GENET envision a world where girls could freely exercise their rights and influence decisions that affect their lives. the organization began as a grassroots movement in Blantyre before expanding nationally through partnerships with community networks, schools, and international NGOs.

== Partnerships ==
- Girls Not Brides
- WomenStrong International

== Impact ==
Since its founding, GENET has reached over a hundred thousand girls across Malawi through school and community programs. The organization has been credited with:

- Influencing the 2015 constitutional amendment that raised the minimum marriage age.
