= Miguel Cané =

Argentine writer and politician (1851–1905)

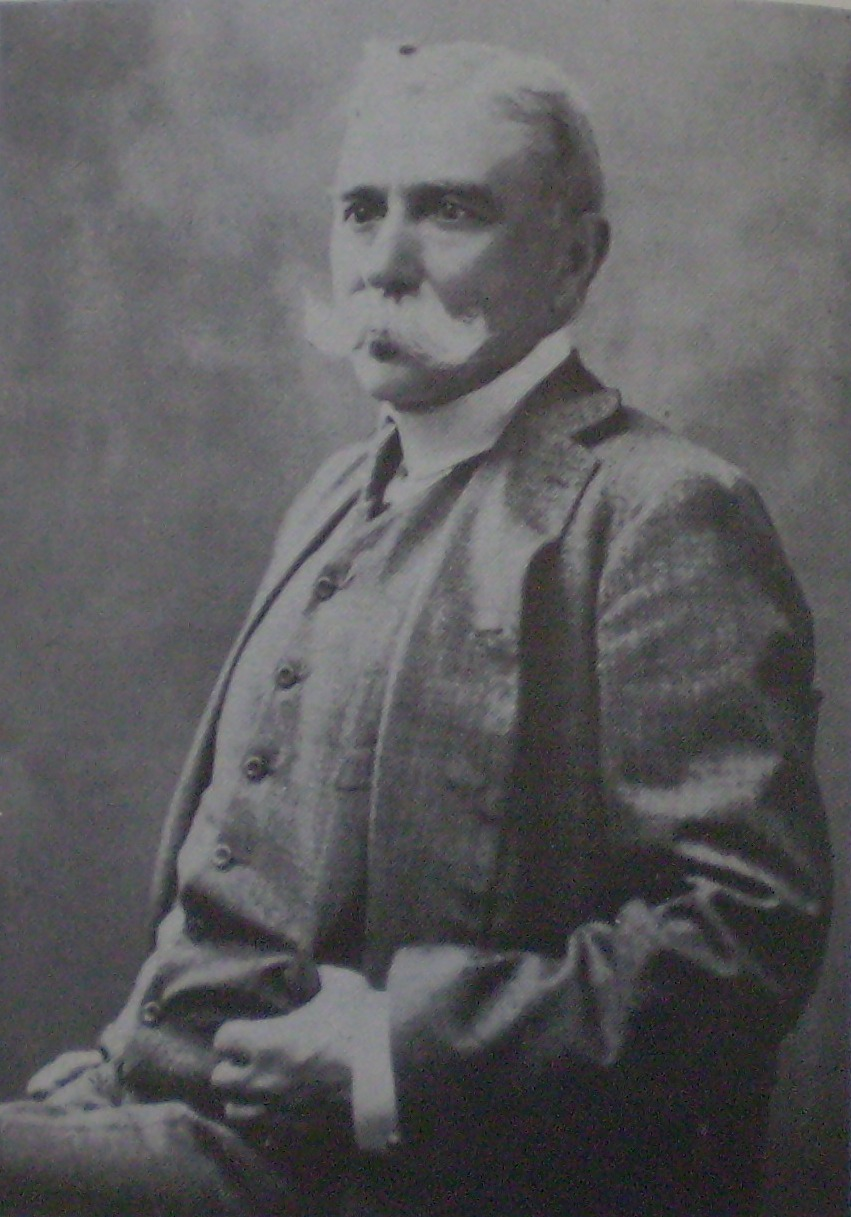
Miguel Cané

Miguel Cané (27 January 1851 – 5 September 1905) was an Argentine writer, lawyer, academic, journalist and politician.

Cané was born in Montevideo, Uruguay, where his family was exiled. He moved to Argentina at the age of two following the fall of Juan Manuel de Rosas. After finishing his studies he worked as a journalist.

Cané held numerous political offices, including minister of external affairs, minister of the interior, provincial and national member of parliament and mayor of Buenos Aires. He also served as a diplomat in Colombia, Venezuela and France. He was a member of the national senate between 1898 and 1904, representing Buenos Aires.

Cané's works included Ensayos (Essays) (1876); Juvenilia (1884), based on memories of his childhood and teenage years; En Viaje 1881-1882 (1884) and Prosa Ligera (1903), a collection of literary writings. Other writings were published posthumously as Discourses and Lectures (1909).

A prominent member of the Generation of '80, Cané was influenced by naturalism and the Parnassian poets.

He died in Buenos Aires, Argentina.

== See also ==
- Al Conti, a relative
