= Xanthe Scharff =

American social entrepreneur

- Born: Chevy Chase, Maryland
- Honours: Many, including distinguished alumna awards from the Fletcher School at Tufts, major journalism awards, and the National Association of Black Journalists Salute to Excellence Award
- Website: fullerproject.org

Xanthe Scharff is an American writer and social entrepreneur, co-founder of The Fuller Project, and founder of Advancing Girls' Education in Africa (AGE Africa). She is the recipient of the 2020 distinguished achievement award from Tufts University. This award was based in part on work the Fuller Project did globally, including hiring hundreds of policewomen in India, introducing new legislation in the United States to protect girls and women, and eliminating virginity testing in the Philippines at state hospitals. When she won the Helen Gurley Brown Genius Award in 2021, the group cited her "mission of bringing groundbreaking stories affecting women to light with the intention of spurring accountability." The National Association of Black Journalists gave her a Salute to Excellence award for reporting in Malawi.

An event that changed her career was in 2005 when she was sent to Malawi to report on what it meant to live on a "dollar a day" by The Christian Science Monitor. Scharff decided to choose a family where one girl had left school even though her older brother was allowed to study further. Scharff was encouraged to visit more than once and after her story was published she was surprised by the reaction. Readers had written offering to pay for the girl, she had profiled, to continue her education. These offers were the basis for starting "Advabcing Girls Education in Africa". AGE provides the funds for girls to stay in education.

== Legacy ==
Scharff reported on three girls who had been scholars in her program, and she published a cover article in The Christian Science Monitor about the girls and the program. She is a senior fellow at the Georgetown Institute for Women, Peace, and Security.

After Scharff left AGE Africa it was led by Ulanda Mtamba in Malawi. In 2024, Mtamba was chosen as one of the BBC's 100 Women together with Michelle Obama, Melinda French Gates, and Amal Clooney. They visited a secondary school in Malawi in November 2023. Obama said that she had heard of the work done in supporting girls education and that her foundation had funded AGE Africa since 2018. Accounts of the visit included quotes from all four of the BBC 100 women.
