= Muisa =

God of death and major antagonist against Mwindo in Nyanga mythology

Muisa is the god of death and a major antagonist against Mwindo in Nyanga mythology. He is typically shown as greedy, cowardly, and manipulative. He is also the father of Kahindo, the goddess of luck.

== Mwindo Epic ==
The culture hero Mwindo is out for revenge against his father, who escapes punishment by entering the underworld through a hole in the ground made from an uprooted kikota. He makes a deal with Muisa to harbor him there, but Mwindo follows him. Along the way, Mwindo meets Kahindo, who would be a beautiful young maiden if she wasn't covered in yaws and pus-filled sores. She falls in love with Mwindo and warns him that he must not accept food or drink from Muisa, or Mwindo will be forced to remain in the land of the dead forever, much like the Greek myth of Persephone. Before he leaves, Mwindo washes Kahindo's yaws.

Mwindo meets with Muisa, who offers him a seat at his table which he declines. He then offers him banana pie (which is actually his feces) and banana beer (which is actually his urine). Mwindo declines those as well. Muisa admits he is sheltering Shemwindo but says he cannot give him to Mwindo unless he completes a task for him: Grow a banana forest and harvest all the fruit in a day.

=== Banana Forest ===
Mwindo waves his magic conga-scepter, which makes the banana forest grow. Hearing of this from one of his servants, Muisa sends his cowry shell belt to kill Mwindo. It strangles Mwindo, but he manages to escape with the help of his scepter. Mwindo then sends his scepter to either hit Muisa's head into the ground or kill and immediately resurrect him. Mwindo returns with the harvested bananas, but Muisa says he must still do one more task: Harvest a bucket of honey from his honey tree.

=== Honey Tree ===
Mwindo uses smoke to drive killer bees away from the tree but finds the trunk indestructible. He calls on Nkuba to hurl lightning at the tree and break it open. Again, Muisa sends his cowry shell belt to kill Mwindo and, again, Mwindo sends his scepter.

=== Punishment ===
When Mwindo returns with the honey, Muisa says he cannot give him his father because he has already escaped. Mwindo responds by beating the god with his scepter and leaving him to follow his father out of the Underworld. At the end of the story, when Mwindo captures his father, he heals Muisa's wounds. Muisa offers his daughter Kahindo to him in marriage, but Mwindo refuses in favor of a human maiden.
