= Tsabango, Lilongwe =

- Location within Malawi
- Coordinates: 14.00803°S 33.78935°E
- Country: Malawi
- Region: Central Region, Malawi
- Municipality: Lilongwe District
- Time zone: UTC+2

Tsabango, Lilondwe is a traditional Authority in Lilondwe. It consists of a number of villages including Chalula, Katotoweka.

== Description ==
It consists of a number of villages including Chalula, Katotoweka. In 2024 the senior chief reported that following vandalism there were twelve villages in Tsabango who were short of clean water. The local health centre confirmed that they were treating a high number of patients with water born diseases.

The secondary school is called Tsabango Community Day Secondary School.

The local MP serves Rumphi Central constituency. In 2025 Enock Chakufwa Chihana was elected but he was promoted to second vice President. In the bi-election that followed Dr. Mathews Mtumbuka of the United Transformation Movement was elected.

== Notable residents ==
Leading activist Ulanda Mtamba was raised here.
