= 2002 (band) =

American new-age band

- Origin: Texas, United States
- Genres: New-age, neo-classical, instrumental music, ambient, Celtic
- Years active: 1992–present
- Labels: Real Music; Gemini Sun Records; Galactic Playground Music
- Members: Randy Copus; Pamela Copus; Sarah Copus
- Website: www.2002music.com

2002 is a new-age group composed of Pamela, Randy, and Sarah Copus. 2002 has charted twelve albums on the Billboard New Age Charts. This Moment Now won the COVR award for Best New Age Album in 2004. 2002 was named amongst the top new-age artists in Billboard's 2003 "Year in Review" issue (December 2003), a list that also featured Yanni, Mannheim Steamroller, Jim Brickman, George Winston, and Enya. They most recently won Best Vocal Album from the ZMR Zone Music Awards in 2015 and the Lifetime Achievement Award from One World Music Radio in 2021.

The themes of several of 2002's albums are deeply rooted in mythology. Wings is based on the Greek legend of Icarus. Savitri and The Emerald Way are both inspired by the ancient Hindu story of Savitri and Satyavan from the Mahabharata. Land of Forever is a ballad of the mystic island of Tír na nÓg, an Irish legend.

Pamela, Randy, and their daughter Sarah record all their music at their state-of-the-art studio. Randy Copus sings and plays piano, electric cello, guitar, bass, and keyboards. Pamela Copus sings and plays flutes, harp, keyboards, and a wind instrument called a WX5. Their daughter Sarah sings and plays Celtic harp, violin, baritone ukulele, and piano. Pamela, Randy, and Sarah provide all of the vocals on their albums, recording their voices many, many times and layering them to create a "virtual choir" with a celestial, angelic quality. The vocals also have many dimensions, as words and chants in Sanskrit, Spanish, Gaelic, Latin and Japanese, representing sacred traditions throughout the world, can be heard on their albums. Pamela and Randy Copus met in their high school's theater department. Randy studied vocals, guitar, pianos, keyboards, trumpet, and tuba before learning recording and production.

Logo from 1992 to 2006

2002 Logo as of 2008. The pair of zeros in 2002 represents the symbol of infinity (∞). Randy and Pamela have stated the name symbolizes their belief that they will be together on "both ends" of infinity.

== Discography ==
=== Studio albums ===
- 1992 – Wings (November 1992)
- 1995 – Savitri (February 1995)
- 1997 – Chrysalis (January 21, 1997)
- 1998 – Land of Forever (May 19, 1998)
- 2000 – River of Stars (January 11, 2000)
- 2002 – Across an Ocean of Dreams (January 22, 2002)
- 2003 – This Moment Now (October 7, 2003)
- 2006 – The Emerald Way (January 31, 2006)
- 2007 – Deep Still Blue (May 8, 2007)
  - Includes a companion DVD of animated oceanic photography and artist interviews
- 2007 – Christmas Dreams (November 7, 2007)
- 2009 – A Word in the Wind (February 10, 2009)
  - Includes a companion DVD of music videos
- 2009 – Wings II: Return to Freedom (November 11, 2009)
- 2011 – Damayanti (April 12, 2011)
- 2012 – Believe (October 16, 2012)
- 2014 – Trail of Dreams (October 7, 2014)
- 2016 – Celtic Fairy Lullaby (February 19, 2016)
- 2018 – A World Away (September 7, 2018)
- 2020 – Celtic Fairy Dream (April 24, 2020)
- 2021 – Hummingbird (June 11, 2021)
- 2023 – Clouds Below (January 7, 2023)
- 2024 – Time Traveler (June 7, 2024)
- 2026 – The Wishing Well (January 16, 2026)
- 2026 – Wings III - Ambient Bliss (October 2, 2026)

=== Singles ===
- 2022 - Landing (July 8, 2022) from the album Clouds Below
- 2022 - Clouds Below (July 29, 2022) from the album Clouds Below
- 2022 - City Blue (October 21, 2022) from the album Clouds Below
- 2023 - Beyond the Veil (June 25, 2023)
- 2023 - Time Traveler (June 25, 2023)

=== Compilations ===
- 2002 – The Sacred Well: The Best of 2002 (October 1, 2002)
  - Retrospective collection of works, includes 2 original songs
- 2007 – Timeless (May 8, 2007)
  - Second retrospective collection of works, contains previously released material

=== Sarah Copus solo albums ===
- 2017 – Moorland Winds (April 21, 2017)

== See also ==
- List of ambient music artists
