= African Palliative Care Association =

Pan-African non-governmental organisation promoting palliative care

- Abbreviation: APCA
- Formation: 2004
- Founded at: Arusha, Tanzania
- Type: Non-governmental organisation
- Purpose: Palliative care, health systems strengthening
- Headquarters: Kampala, Uganda
- Region served: Africa
- Executive Director: Dr. Eve Namisango
- Website: africanpalliativecare.org

The African Palliative Care Association (APCA) is a pan-African non-governmental organisation headquartered in Kampala, Uganda, dedicated to promoting and supporting the integration of palliative care into health systems across Africa. Founded in 2004 following the Cape Town Declaration (2002), APCA works to ensure access to pain relief and palliative care as a human right for all Africans with life-limiting illnesses.

APCA serves as the continental coordinating body for palliative care development, providing technical assistance, advocacy, and capacity building to member organisations across sub-Saharan Africa. The association currently operates under a 2020–2030 Strategic Framework aligned with the World Health Organization's health system building blocks and Universal Health Coverage (UHC) goals, and is set to contribute to the SDGs health goals. In 2024–2025, APCA marked its 20th anniversary, celebrating two decades of advocacy that contributed to the integration of palliative care into national health policies in over 20 African countries.

== History ==
=== Origins and foundation (2002–2004) ===
APCA's origins trace to November 2002, when 28 palliative care trainers from 15 African countries convened in Cape Town, South Africa, to address the critical need for regional cooperation in palliative care development. This meeting produced the Cape Town Declaration, which established palliative care, pain management, and symptom control as fundamental human rights for adults and children with life-limiting illnesses.

Following two years of interim coordination, APCA was formally established in Arusha, Tanzania in 2004 as a pan-African non-governmental organisation, with initial support from the Diana, Princess of Wales Memorial Fund and the Open Society Foundations.

=== Expansion and institutional development (2005–2019) ===
During its first decade, APCA focused on developing training curricula, establishing national palliative care associations, and advocating for policy changes regarding access to essential medicines, particularly opioids for pain management. The organisation developed key partnerships with Human Rights Watch, the World Health Organization, and the African Union, as well as with other global and regional hospice palliative care associations.

Under founding Executive Director Dr. Faith Mwangi-Powell (2004–2012), APCA established the Palliative Care Handbook for Africa and developed training programmes reaching thousands of healthcare workers across the continent.

=== Strategic transformation and 20th anniversary (2020–present) ===
In 2020, APCA launched its current Strategic Framework (2020–2030), shifting focus from palliative care as a standalone service to comprehensive chronic care integrated within national health systems and UHC schemes.This framework emphasises the WHO building blocks:

- service delivery
- health workforce
- information systems
- medical products
- financing
- leadership/governance

APCA marked its 20th anniversary in 2024, celebrating two decades of advocacy and programming that contributed to the integration of palliative care into national health policies in over 20 African countries and the establishment of palliative care education in numerous medical and nursing schools. In October 2025, the organisation marked a leadership transition with the retirement of executive director Dr. Emmanuel Luyirika after 13 years of service.

== Mission and strategic framework ==
APCA's mission is to ensure that palliative and comprehensive chronic care are widely understood and integrated into health systems at all levels, to reduce pain and suffering across Africa. The organisation's 2020–2030 Strategic Framework is built on four strategic objectives:

1. Increasing knowledge and awareness: Developing tailored information resources and convening forums to address the continuum of care from health promotion to disease prevention, diagnosis, treatment, rehabilitation, and palliation.
2. Strengthening health systems: Supporting national policy frameworks, health workforce development, and integration of palliative care into primary healthcare and UHC schemes.
3. Building the evidence base: Supporting research priorities, expanding the African Palliative Care Research Network (APCRN), and establishing the APCA Centre of Research and Excellence.
4. Ensuring sustainability: Developing diversified financing mechanisms, tiered membership structures, and hybrid funding models to ensure organisational and programmatic sustainability.

== Leadership ==
=== Current executive director ===
Dr. Eve Namisango has served as Executive Director since October 2025, succeeding Dr. Emmanuel Luyirika following his retirement after 13 years of service. Dr. Namisango previously served as APCA's Head of Programmes and Research, where she led the development of the African Children's Palliative Care Outcome Scale (APCA C-POS)—a novel outcome measure now used in over 2,000 children across three demonstration sites in Uganda and adapted for use in Europe, Asia, and the Middle East.

Dr. Namisango is a researcher in palliative care outcomes and implementation science, with experience in health systems strengthening across Africa. She has led multi-country initiatives and partnerships with institutions including King's College London, the University of Leeds, and the National Institute for Health Research (NIHR). Under her leadership, APCA continues to advance digital health innovations such as the Mpalliative app and research translation into policy.

=== Previous executive directors ===
- Dr. Emmanuel Luyirika (2012–2025): Served for 13 years, transitioning APCA from a service-delivery focus to health systems strengthening. He previously served as Country Director for Mildmay International Uganda and represented African palliative care at the World Health Assembly.
- Dr. Faith Mwangi-Powell (2004–2012): Founding director who established APCA's foundational training programmes and continental reach.

=== Governance ===
APCA is governed by a Board of Directors comprising representatives from across Africa, including palliative care practitioners, policymakers, legal experts, and civil society leaders. The Board provides strategic oversight while the Kampala-based Secretariat manages day-to-day operations, regional technical assistance, and coordination with national palliative care associations.

== How APCA works ==
APCA functions as a pan-African coordinating body and technical assistance hub, operating through four primary mechanisms:

=== Membership and network coordination ===
APCA operates a tiered membership structure comprising:

- National Palliative Care Associations: Country-level coordinating bodies with voting rights
- Institutional Members: Hospitals, hospices, and academic institutions providing palliative care services
- Individual Professional Members: Healthcare workers, researchers, and advocates
- Associate Members: International organisations and corporate partners

As of 2024–2025, APCA's membership includes over 6,300 individuals and institutions across Africa and globally.

=== Technical assistance and health systems integration ===
APCA provides demand-driven technical assistance to governments and health systems through policy development, standard setting, and systems strengthening. The organisation employs a "catalyst" model, working alongside national governments to build sustainable capacity rather than establishing parallel service delivery systems.

=== Knowledge management and learning ===
APCA serves as the continental repository for palliative care evidence through the APCA African Palliative Care Database, communities of practice, and editorial oversight of the Africa edition of ehospice, an online global palliative care news platform.

=== Advocacy and coalition building ===
APCA coordinates multi-stakeholder advocacy targeting medicines access, policy integration, and human rights engagement with the African Commission on Human and Peoples' Rights.

== Programmes and activities ==
=== Capacity building and technical assistance ===
APCA provides technical assistance to ministries of health to develop national palliative care policies and integrate services into disease-specific programmes including HIV/AIDS, cancer, and non-communicable diseases. The organisation has supported over 31 training institutions to integrate palliative care into medical and nursing curricula.

=== Medicines access and policy advocacy ===
A core focus involves advocating for improved access to essential controlled medicines for pain management. APCA has supported seven countries—Botswana, Ghana, Eswatini, Rwanda, Mozambique, Kenya, and Nigeria—to establish local oral morphine reconstitution capabilities. APCA continues to support other countries, including the Democratic Republic of the Congo and Togo, which are currently in the process of doing so.

=== Research and evidence generation ===
APCA hosts the African Palliative Care Research Network (APCRN), which has grown to over 400 members. The organisation has implemented 45 research projects resulting in over 200 peer-reviewed publications, including in The Lancet Global Health. In 2025, APCA launched the APCA Centre of Research and Excellence, establishing regional hubs at Makerere University (East Africa), University of Ibadan (West Africa), University of Cape Town (Southern Africa), and Cairo University (North Africa).

=== Service delivery support ===
Through the True Colours Trust Small Grants Programme, APCA has awarded 295 sub-grants to palliative care providers across 29 African countries, supporting 1,873 adult patients and 137 children with palliative care services in the 2024–2025 period alone.

=== Digital health innovation ===
APCA partnered with Leeds University and MRT IT Peaks to develop the Mpalliative app, enabling patients and families to self-report symptoms from home with real-time data transmission to clinicians. This innovation won the 2025 APCA Innovation Award.

== Partnerships and collaborations ==
APCA collaborates with multilateral organisations, governments, and civil society groups including:

Partner type	Organisations
World Health Organization (WHO)	Technical collaboration on normative guidelines and essential medicines lists
African Union & Africa CDC	Integration of palliative care into continental health strategies
Academic institutions	Makerere University, University of Cape Town, King's College London, University of Leeds, University of Navarra (ATLANTES Global Observatory)
Philanthropic partners	True Colours Trust, Open Society Foundations, Global Partners in Care, Irish Hospice Foundation
Professional networks	Worldwide Hospice Palliative Care Alliance (WHPCA), International Association for Hospice and Palliative Care (IAHPC), International Children's Palliative Care Network (ICPCN)
Government partnerships	Ministries of Health in Botswana, Kenya, Malawi, Rwanda, Uganda, Zambia, and others

== Impact and recognition ==
APCA's advocacy and technical assistance have contributed to:

- Integration of palliative care into national health policies in over 20 African countries
- Development of palliative care curricula in medical and nursing schools across the continent
- Increased availability of oral morphine in several African countries through regulatory reforms
- Recognition of palliative care as a human right by the African Commission on Human and Peoples' Rights (Resolution 392, 2017)
- The 2025 APCA Atlas of Palliative Care in Africa, providing the first comprehensive mapping of service availability using WHO indicators across the continent

== Publications ==
APCA has produced several key resources for palliative care development in Africa:

- A Palliative Care Handbook for Africa (endorsed by WHO)
- APCA Atlas of Palliative Care in Africa (2017 and 2025 editions)
- Beating Pain: A Pocket Guide to Pain Management in Africa
- Guidelines for Establishing Palliative Care Programmes in Sub-Saharan Africa
- African Children's Palliative Care Outcome Scale (APCA C-POS) and accompanying guidelines
- Essential Package of Palliative Care in UHC and costing model
