= Kathy Sanborn =

American singer-songwriter

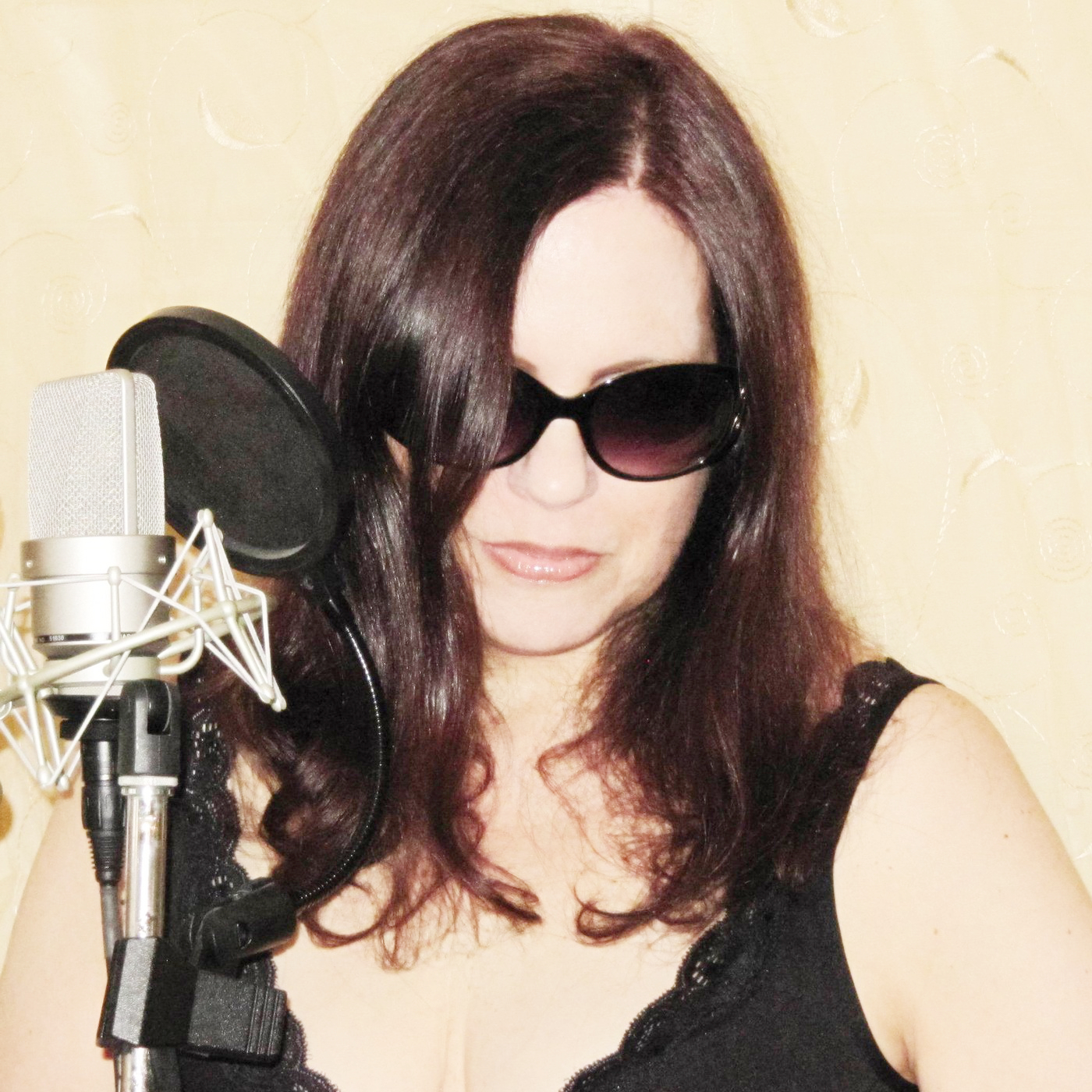
- Vocalist and composer Kathy Sanborn

Background information
- Born: Berkeley, California, U.S.
- Genres: Jazz, vocal jazz, world music
- Occupations: Singer, musician
- Instruments: Vocals, piano
- Label: Pacific Coast Jazz
- Website: www.kathysanborn.com

Kathy Sanborn (born January 16, ?) is an American jazz vocalist and composer based in California. She won a 2015 American Songwriting Award for her song, "Fantasy."

== Style ==
Sanborn has been compared to 1950s cool jazz singers Anita O'Day, Chris Connor, and June Christy due to her smooth vocals and clear diction. Her vocal tone has been compared to the 1970s singer-songwriter Laura Nyro for its depth and timbre. JazzTimes on Sanborn's work: "Romance is always in the air as far as Kathy Sanborn is concerned, and her songs are reflections of those emotions which take flight when overpowered by love."

Spain's NoSoloSmoothJazz.com says: "Kathy Sanborn is one of the most original vocalists in the American musical landscape."

With the release of Peaceful Sounds, Eric Cohen of New York radio station WAER proclaimed that Sanborn's voice "truly is a gift from the heavens."

== Early life ==
Sanborn demonstrated a love of music from an early age, and performed in front of a mirror in her bedroom. She began ballet studies as a youth, but turned her focus to piano and voice, performing in various school plays and concerts.

Her father was an amateur sax player and lover of big band music. Consequently, Sanborn had an early introduction to jazz music and its major performers.

== Career ==
Self-released in 2008, Peaceful Sounds is Sanborn's debut album, combining jazz and new age music. The sometimes dark and philosophical album garnered almost immediate international radio attention. She followed it with Small Galaxy (2010), a more upbeat album which reached No. 4 on radio station WSCA's Top Chart.

Blues for Breakfast (2011), featured Grammy nominee Scott Petito on bass, Chris Carey on drums, and Wayne Ricci on trumpet. The title track showcased Sanborn's love of jazz history and her affection for the famed musicians of the 1930s-50s who performed on New York's 52nd Street. Sanborn said, "I wrote the song, 'Blues for Breakfast', as a fond tribute to the jazz masters of days gone by. On New York's 52nd Street, the greats would 'walk the high wire' and enthrall and inspire new generations of jazz players. As jazz continues to evolve in the modern era, I imagine the masters are looking down and nodding their approval."

In 2011, Sanborn released her single, "Magnetized," dedicated to film historian and Turner Classic Movies host Robert Osborne. A fan of classic movies, Sanborn composed the jazz love song as an homage to the power of attraction exhibited by film stars.

Six Degrees of Cool (2012) showcased Sanborn's cool jazz roots. The album includes "Bitter Winter" and "Shanty Man," songs referring to societal effects of economic depression. "Drawing from renowned influences such as cool jazz giants Miles Davis, Chet Baker, and Anita O'Day, Sanborn's new album brings cool jazz into today's contemporary scene."

Sultry Night (2013) includes songs honoring Anita O'Day and Cary Grant. Sanborn composed, arranged, sang, played piano, and produced the album.

Sanborn won a 2015 American Songwriting Award for "Fantasy," the first single released from her 2015 album, Lights of Laniakea.

Grammy winner Ricky Kej worked with Sanborn on the album Lights of Laniakea (2015).

Says Sanborn, "Back in 2014 at the University of Hawaii, scientists mapped a new supercluster that contains our own galaxy, the Milky Way. They named it Laniakea, which means, 'Immeasurable Heaven.' The album, Lights of Laniakea, describes our universal desire to live in the light – in the 'immeasurable heaven' that is our home."

In 2016, Lights of Laniakea was nominated for a ZMR Award (Best Vocal Album) and a One World Music Radio Award (Best Vocal Album).

Sanborn appeared on the compilation Action Moves People United, which also featured Julian Lennon, Janis Ian, and Dan Aykroyd, among many others. The album reached Billboard's top ten chart for compilation albums.

Beginning 2016, Sanborn contributed a column to the jazz web site, All About Jazz. Titled "In the Biz," the column featured Sanborn's interviews with jazz colleagues such as David Longoria, Arun Shenoy, Carol Albert, Roberta Piket, and many more. The column focused on the business of jazz music today, and how jazz musicians can best promote themselves and their music.

Sanborn's eighth album, Recollecting You, released August 4, 2017. A single from the album, "Falling," won a 2017 Clouzine International Music Award for Best Jazz Song.

In 2017, Sanborn appeared on the World music album, A Musical Journey: Together in Peace, which reached Billboard #1 in World albums. The project, created by Rupam Sarmah and Kevin Mackie, is a collaborative effort to promote global peace.

The composer and vocalist is a strong believer in creating new jazz music for the modern era. Sanborn says, "Instead of regurgitating old standards, we need to keep the jazz genre alive by releasing fresh music for new generations. Write new standards, and stop relying on old music to pave the way for any positive changes in jazz. There is an important place in jazz for the old songs that have touched listeners for decades, but if we wish to reach new and broader markets, we need to move forward – and not exist solely in the past. Miles Davis, if he were here today, would be shocked that jazz music has not moved further ahead by now."

Sanborn released Romance Language, her ninth album, July 11, 2025. The title track was dedicated to MGM film studios trumpeter Uan Rasey.

== Awards and honors ==
Year	Award	Category	Nominated work	Result
2014	Hollywood Music in Media Awards	Best World Song	Fantasy	Nominated
2015	American Songwriting Awards	Best World Music Song	Fantasy	Won
2016	ZMR Awards	Best Vocal Album	Lights of Laniakea	Nominated
2016	One World Music Radio Awards	Best Vocal Album	Lights of Laniakea	Nominated
2017	Clouzine International Music Awards	Best Jazz Song	Falling	Won

== Discography ==
Release date	Album	Label
2008	Peaceful Sounds	Self-released
2010	Small Galaxy	Pacific Coast Jazz
2011	Blues for Breakfast	Pacific Coast Jazz
2012	Six Degrees of Cool	Pacific Coast Jazz
2013	Sultry Night	Pacific Coast Jazz
2014	Fantasía	Pacific Coast Jazz
2015	Lights of Laniakea	That Other Label
2017	Recollecting You	Pacific Coast Jazz
2025	Romance Language	Pacific Coast Jazz
