= Faith Mwangi-Powell =

Kenyan CEO (born 1964)

- Born: July 1964 (age 62); Kenya
- Occupation: Chief Executive Officer
- Known for: CEO of Girls Not Brides

Faith Mwangi-Powell (born July 1964) is a Kenyan CEO who has led organisations concerned with palliative care, FGM and child brides. In 2019 she became the CEO of Girls Not Brides.

== Life ==
Mwangi-Powell was born in rural Kenya in 1964. She studied for her masters degree and doctorate in the UK. Her Ph.D. is in women's health and development and she has published over 20 peer reviewed papers.

Mwangi-Powell was the founding director of African Palliative Care Association. The APCA was founded in Cape Town in 2002 after 28 African palliative care trainers discussed the need for regional cooperation. The group produced the Cape Town Declaration. She held that position until 2012 when she became the senior program officer for global advocacy with the International Palliative Care Initiative of the Open Society Foundations.

In 2018 she was leading Girl Generation which launched a Zero Tolerance Day campaign on 6 February. She believed that FGM could be ended "in a generation" despite a prevalence of over 90% in Egypt and Somalia.

In 2019 she became the Chief Executive Officer for Girls Not Brides which is a global partnership to end child marriage.

Four of the 2023 BBC 100 women who were concerned about the education of girls in Malawi; Michelle Obama, Melinda French Gates, Amal Clooney and Ulanda Mtamba visited a Malawian secondary school in November 2023. The four went on to a meeting in South Africa chaired by the former First Lady of South Africa and Mozambique Graça Machel. The four, representatives of the Women Lawyers Association of Malawi and Mwangi-Powell as CEO of Girls Not Brides discussed their visit and the problem of child marriage.

In October 2026 she took up a new role as the CEO of Alzheimer's Disease International.
