= Mwindo epic =

Oral tale from the Congo told by the Nyanga people

The Mwindo epic is an oral tale from the Congo told by the Nyanga people. The origins and creation of the Mwindo epic are mostly unknown since the story is only passed down orally. A version of the story was recorded by Kahombo Mateene and Daniel Biebuyck and published in 1969.

== Performance ==
The Mwindo Epic, like many oral myths, is spoken as well as performed among gatherings of locals. It focuses on a hero with supernatural powers named Mwindo who had many adventures. The myth is performed mostly by a single bard wielding a calabash made into a rattle and donning various bells and other forms of noisemakers. To tell the story properly the bard acts out all the parts and does not refrain from being very animated in his dances and acting. It is not unusual for the bard to throw in some narrative not native to the story detailing his own life and his own personal experiences. The narrator is usually accompanied by four younger men who play on a percussion stick.

Audience participation is important. The audience will often sing along with the narrator and the percussionists during the songs, and repeat certain lines of the story while the narrator pauses between sections. The bard is often shown appreciation by the audience with applause, yells, and gifts.

== Characters ==
- Mwindo – the protagonist, a child with magical powers
- Shemwindo – Mwindo's father and the main antagonist
- Nyamwindo – Mwindo's mother
- Iyangura – Nyamwindo's sister, Mwindo's aunt
- Mukiti – river deity and Iyangura's husband, a water serpent
- Kasiyembe – Mukiti's servant
- Nkuba – the god of lightning
- Yana – the bat god and patron of blacksmiths
- Kahindo – Muisa's daughter and goddess of luck
- Muisa – the god of the dead
- Ntumba – the aardvark god
- Sheburungu – the sky god and creator deity
- Kirimu – seven-headed serpent and Nkuba's brother, who was slain by Mwindo

== Plot ==
=== Birth ===
The Epic begins in the village of Tubondo ruled by the evil chief Shemwindo. He decrees upon his seven wives that they must only produce him daughters; if a son is born, the baby (and in some versions, his mother too) will be executed. This is a ploy by Shemwindo to get richer, as it is tradition for a suitor who wants to marry a woman to pay a dowry, or bride-price, to her father.

He impregnates his seven wives at the same time. Meanwhile, Mukiti asks for Iyangura's hand in marriage; it is accepted and after elaborate ceremonies they are married. She will live in the village, guarded by Kasiyembe, while Mukiti will live in a pool of the river. Shimwendo's first six wives soon give birth to daughters, but Nyamwindo, the seventh wife, endures a prolonged pregnancy. This prevents her from being able to perform her duties and chores but to her surprise every task is mysteriously done without her aid; this is the work of her unborn son. At the time of his deliverance, the unborn child climbs from the womb and emerges from Nyamwindo's belly button. This male child is named Mwindo. The child was born wielding a conga-scepter (a flyswatter made with a buffalo tail on a wooden handle), an adze-axe, and a bag of the fortune goddess Kahindo containing a long rope.

Shemwindo soon learns of the birth and tries to kill the boy in several ways. First he throws six consecutive spears, which were all repelled by Mwindo's conga-scepter; second he tries to bury his son alive, but Mwindo simply climbs up during the night; and finally he seals the boy inside a drum and throws it by a nearby river.

Unsurprisingly, the drum surfaces and floats but Mwindo decides to sail away, to seek refuge with his paternal aunt Iyangura.

=== Journey to Iyangura ===
Mwindo, still inside the drum, encounters many aquatic animals, to which he boasts his prowess. After a while, his path is blocked by Musoka, the sister-in-law of Iyangura, under the orders of Mukiti, Musoka's brother and Iyangura's husband. But Mwindo simply digs under the river's sandy floor, reemerging after passing by Musoka, and continues on his quest.

Mwindo then encounters Mukiti, the serpent spirit and the husband of Iyangura, who also denies the boy access to his aunt. Meanwhile, a group of Iyangura's maidens, who had been gathering water in a nearby watering hole, witness them. The maidens quickly report to Iyangura. At once, his aunt retrieves the drum and slashing it open with a knife releases Mwindo from his cage. She then instructs Mwindo to go ahead to her house.

Mukiti holds a secret council on how to kill the boy. Meanwhile, Katee, the hedgehog god, warns Mwindo of the dangers ahead if he continues to his aunt's abode. Undeterred, Mwindo wishes to go to his aunt's home anyway. Katee assists him by building a tunnel that leads directly to Iyangura's house. Unbeknownst to them, however, Mukiti had already instructed his ally, Kasiyembe, to set multiple pit traps on the floors of Iyangura's house.

As soon as Mwindo exits the tunnel at his aunt's home, Kasiyembe challenges him to a dancing contest in the hopes that the boy will fall into at least one of the pit traps which contain razor-sharp spikes down below. One by one, Mwindo dances down the middle of each trap but does not fall due to the intervention of Master Spider. Because he favored Mwindo, Master Spider had built bridges of silk so thin they were essentially invisible over every pit trap before Mwindo's arrival.

Kasiyembe then calls upon Nkuba to hurl lightning at Mwindo. Nkuba hurls seven consecutive lightning strikes but all attempts—barely—miss. In retaliation, Mwindo uses his magic to set Kasiyembe's hair ablaze while stopping up water sources to prevent anyone from putting out the fire. Unable to extinguish the flames on his head, Kasiyembe dies.

Iyangura tearfully begs her nephew to show mercy and implores him to revive Kasiyembe. Mwindo, moved by her compassion, waves his conga-scepter over Kasiyembe's face. Suddenly, Kasiyembe is resurrected and the water supply replenished. Kasiyembe repents and acknowledges Mwindo's superiority.

=== Return to Tubondo ===
After accomplishing these deeds, Mwindo tells his aunt that he plans to return to his home village alone the next day. Iyangura persuades him to take her and a handful of warriors to his aid. She also persuades him to head first to the home of the Yana, Mwindo's maternal uncle, so that he can "forge him," for he is also a renowned smith. The bat god forges him: some versions say that they make him a full body armor while some versions say that they cut his body into parts which are then forged and put back together, turning his body into iron. His uncles then join the procession to Tubondo.

Upon reaching the outside of the village and setting up camp, Iyangura expresses her concern that the army has nothing to eat. Mwindo simply waves his conga-scepter singing his magic songs. Almost instantly, enough food is magically brought from Tubondo to feed Mwindo's entire camp.

Mwindo then sends first his uncles and the warriors to fight while he and his aunt observe. A battle erupts between Mwindo's forces and those of Shemwindo, continuing until all of Mwindo's forces are wiped out. One of Mwindo's uncles barely escapes with his life, and reports back at camp. Mwindo goes to the village center and calls upon Nkuba, the lightning god, while raising his conga-scepter to the heavens. Almost immediately, seven lightning bolts obliterate the village burning its inhabitants to ashes.

Using his conga-scepter, Mwindo revives his uncles before giving chase to his father. Meanwhile, Shemwindo barely escapes the destruction. Shemwindo goes to a kikota-plant, uproots it (revealing a deep pit), and descends. This becomes the portal to the Underworld, the realm of the Nyanga Pantheon.

=== Journey to the Underworld ===
When Mwindo learns of this, he goes down to the underworld the same way his father, Shemwindo did. Mwindo falls in darkness until he lands in the great cavernous jungles of the Underworld. He follows a path until he comes to the hut of Kahindo, daughter of Muisa. Kahindo would be a beautiful young maiden, but she is infected with yaws, which leaves pus-filled sores all over her body. She falls in love with Mwindo and agrees to help him beat her father. She warns Mwindo that when they meet, Mwindo must not accept a seat, food, or drink from Muisa, or Mwindo will be forced to remain in the land of the dead forever. In gratitude, Mwindo washes Kahindo's sores, and in the morning she looks a little better.

Mwindo meets with Muisa, who admits he is sheltering Shemwindo, but states that he will not give the chieftain to Mwindo unless Mwindo proves his worth by doing a "little task." He must grow a banana forest and harvest the fruit—all in one day. Mwindo agrees. That night, Mwindo stays again in Kahindo's house and washes her wounds. In the morning, she looks much better. Mwindo uses his powers to make the banana forest grow. One of Muisa's servants sees this and tells his master. Muisa sends his cowry shell belt to kill Mwindo. It begins strangling Mwindo, but at the last minute he knocks it away with his scepter. Mwindo sends the scepter to punish Muisa, and the scepter bangs the god's head into the ground. Mwindo returns with the harvested bananas, but Muisa says he must still do one more task. In the morning, he must harvest a bucket of honey from the god's honey tree. Mwindo is frustrated, but he agrees. That night, Mwindo stays again in Kahindo's house and washes her wounds. In the morning, she looks completely normal. Mwindo uses smoke to drive the killer bees away from the tree, but then finds the trunk is petrified and impossible to break. He calls on Nkuba, who blows up the tree by hurling a thunderbolt into the Underworld. One of Muisa's servants sees this, and warns his master. Muisa again sends his cowry shell belt to kill Mwindo. It begins strangling Mwindo, but at the last minute he knocks it away with his scepter. Once again, Mwindo sends the scepter to punish Muisa, and the scepter bangs the god's head into the ground. Mwindo returns with the honey, but Muisa says he cannot give him Shemwindo. The chieftain has already escaped, back to the world by another tunnel. Outraged, Mwindo beats the god flat with his scepter and promises to leave him that way until he finds Shemwindo. Mwindo then says goodbye to Kahindo and follows his father back out of the Underworld.

Mwindo follows the trail of his father to a cave which is blocked by the huge aardvark spirit, Ntumba. Mwindo warns Ntumba to step aside, but Ntumba refuses. Mwindo calls on Nkuba to blow up the cave, and finds that Shemwindo is hiding behind the aardvark. Shemwindo gets away. Mwindo punishes the aardvark by inflicting him with elephantiasis, a painful swelling disease. Mwindo returns to the world and pursues his father all the way to the Great Rift Valley, where the trail stops. Mwindo realizes his father has escaped into the clouds, but he does not know how to follow. He sees the giant children of the Sky God playing nearby and asks their help. They say they will help if Mwindo makes them a snack. He brings them twelve enormous bowls, cut from tree trunks, full of good things to eat. As the children finish their snack, they turn the bowls upside down and stack them, making a stairway into the clouds. Mwindo climbs the bowls and comes to the village of the Sky God, Sheburungu. Sheburungu refuses to give up Shemwindo unless Mwindo gambles for him. Mwindo wagers all his cattle from Tubondo and loses. He bets all his houses and loses. He then wagers all his people, even his mother and his aunt, and loses. Finally he bets his conga scepter and begins winning everything back, until he owns all the Sky God's town and his father's life.

Shemwindo is brought forth in chains. Mwindo gives the Sky God back his town. He then retraces his steps. He cures Ntumba of elephantiasis. He heals Muisa's wounds, but when Muisa offers his daughter Kahindo to him in marriage, Mwindo refuses. He must return to the world and marry a human maiden. Mwindo returns to Tubondo, helps rebuild the city, and rules as a wise and powerful king. He has three brass thrones made, which float ten feet off the ground. Mwindo sits in the middle, his aunt on the right, and his imprisoned father on the left. Shemwindo's punishment is to live the rest of his life watching his son be a better ruler than he was.

== Sources ==
- Thury, E. Devinney, M. (2005). Introduction to Mythology. New York: Oxford University Press. ISBN 0-19-517968-4
- Biebuyck, Daniel and Mateene Kahombo (editors and translators) (1969). The Mwindo Epic: From the Banyanga (Zaire). Berkeley and Los Angeles: University of California Press ISBN 0-520-02049-9
