= Until There's a Cure =

Until There's A Cure Foundation
- Formation: 1993
- Tax ID no.: 94-3181306
- Purpose: HIV/AIDS Awareness
- Location: Redwood City, CA
- Key people: Nora Hanna, Executive Director
- Affiliations: Immunity Project
- Revenue: $233,784 (2016)
- Expenses: $300,080 (2016)
- Website: until.org

Until There's A Cure is a national organization based in Redwood City, California, dedicated to eradicating HIV/AIDS by raising awareness and funds to combat the pandemic. The organization raises money for research, treatment, and care of people living with HIV and AIDS through fundraisers, the sale of bracelets, and donations.

The mission of Until There's A Cure is to fund prevention education, care services, and vaccine development, and to increase public awareness of AIDS, using The Bracelet as the tool. The Bracelet not only serves as a bridge to unite people to fight HIV/AIDS, but also helps to increase consciousness, compassion, understanding, and responsibility.

Until There's A Cure funds programs which promote AIDS awareness and prevention education, provides financial support for care and services for those living with an AIDS diagnosis, and supports and advocates for HIV vaccine development.

== History ==
Until There's a Cure was created in 1993 by two California mothers who were concerned about the effects of HIV/AIDS on their children. The Foundation was the first non-profit to create and sell a bracelet to raise money for a cause.

== Bracelets ==
Much of the Foundation’s revenue comes from the sale of bracelets of various styles. The first bracelet was the silver cuff, created to spur conversation about what was, in 1993, a sensitive topic. Inspired by the POW-MIA bracelets from the Vietnam War, the bracelet was created by Isabel Geddes of Florence, Italy, in 1993. Since then, many more styles have been added to Until’s inventory. Some of these bracelets are factory made, while others are made through individual craftsmen.

Many of the bracelets are hand-made by women living with HIV in developing countries all over the world. These women receive the funds from the sale of their bracelets in order to help pay for their HIV medication or other important expenses they may not otherwise be able to afford, such as sending their daughters to school.

== Partners ==
Until There's a Cure partners with many organizations and people. The main ones are listed here, but there are many more.

=== San Francisco Giants ===
In partnership with the San Francisco Giants, Until There's a Cure hosts a fundraiser during one game a year. This fundraiser, which includes raffle tickets, bracelet sales, and an announcement at half-time, is the organization's biggest fundraiser all year. They have been partnering with the SF Giants for over 20 years, and have raised $1.5 million together.

=== Cheer for Life ===
Cheer SF helps Until There's a Cure to fund-raise at various events, including the yearly Giants Game.

=== Celebrities ===
Various celebrities have been a part of Until’s public service announcements. Many actors and other people have been photographed by Michael Collopy wearing Until’s bracelets in order to raise awareness for the cause. Some celebrity endorsements include Alan Cumming, Jessica Alba, and Tara Reid.

=== Timothy R Brown Foundation ===
Timothy Ray Brown, more commonly known as the Berlin patient, is the first person to be officially cured of HIV/AIDS. Until There's a Cure partners with his foundation, and sells the pin created especially for him.
