= Rebeca Gyumi =

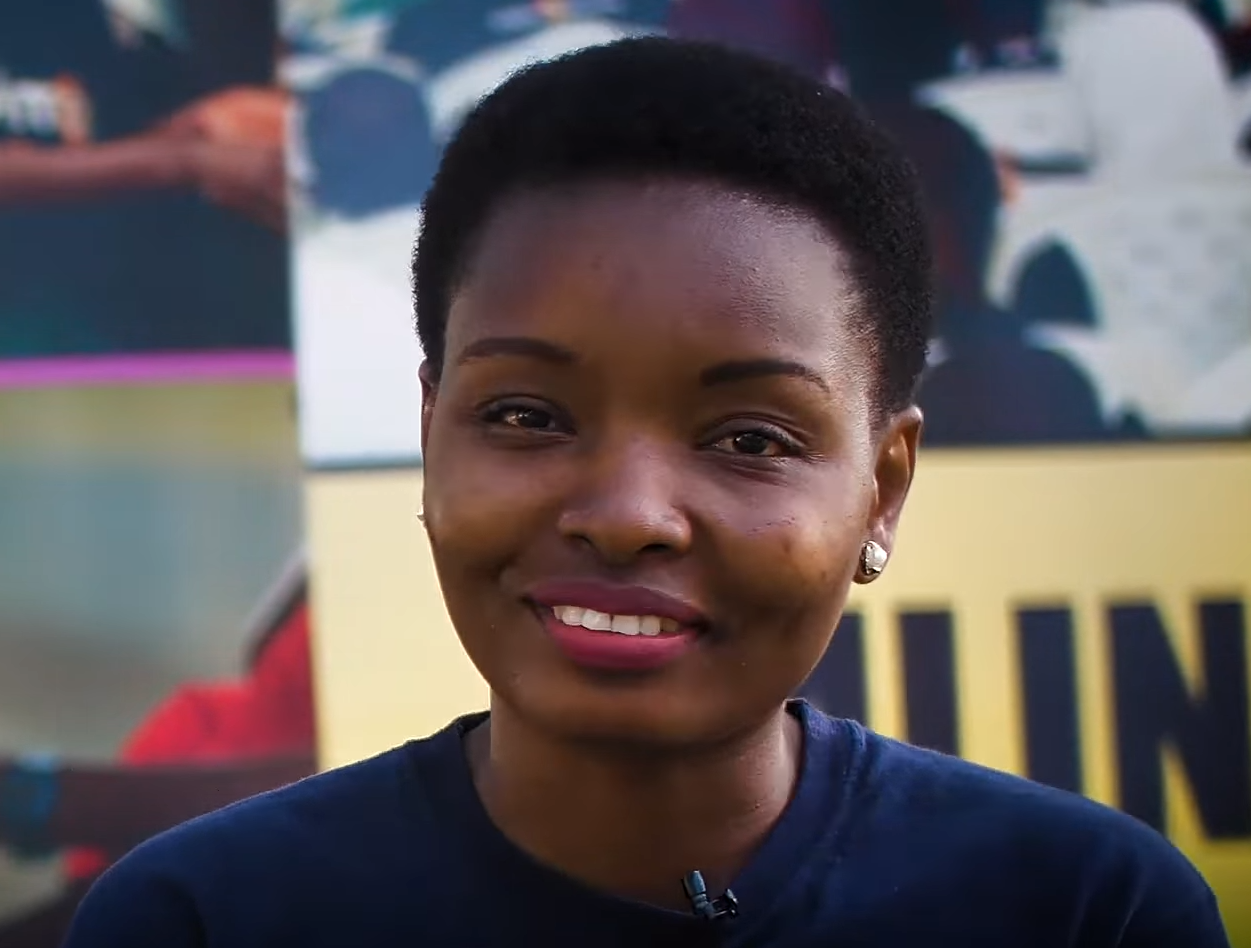
- Gyumi in 2018
- Born: 3 December 1986 (age 39); Dodoma Tanzania
- Education: University of Dar Es Salaam ( LL.B)
- Occupations: Founder, executive director, activist, lawyer, television host
- Website: msichana.or.tz

Rebeca Z. Gyumi is the Founder & Executive Director at Msichana Initiative, a Tanzanian NGO which aims to empower girls through education, and address key challenges which limit girls' right to education. She has worked for over 8 years with Femina, a youth-focused organisation, as a TV personality and youth advocate.

== Early life and education ==
She was born in Dodoma, Tanzania, where she began her education at Mazengo Primary School. She continued her secondary studies at Kikuyu Day Secondary School in Dodoma, before advancing to Kilakala High School in Morogoro. She later pursued a law degree at the University of Dar es Salaam, from which she graduated.

== Career ==
A United Nations video featuring Gyumi and her work

Gyumi is a lawyer and the founder and executive director at Msichana Initiative, a Tanzanian NGO which aims to empower girls through their education, and address challenges which limit a girl’s right to education. Gyumi began work with Femina in 2008, employed as a TV personality and as a youth advocate.

Gyumi won a landmark case on child marriages, through the petition she filed at the High Court of Tanzania to challenge the Tanzania Marriage Act, 1971 which allowed girls as young as 14 to get married. The resulting decision raised the minimum age of marriage to 18 for both boys and girls.

Gyumi engages in youth advocacy through her work with organizations and her volunteer efforts.

She has travelled across Tanzania to engage young people on civic participation, sexual and reproductive health, and economic empowerment. Her advocacy has led her to speak and facilitate at national and international forums focused on youth and girls.

Gyumi served as Vice-President of the Tanzania Association of U.S. State Alumni (TUSSAA), was the Trek4Mandela Tanzania leg ambassador, and is a board member of SNV-Netherlands' Opportunity for Youth Employment (OYE) project. In July 2013, she chaired the National Youth Constitution Forum, where youth from both the mainland and Zanzibar reviewed the draft Constitution.

Gyumi chaired the National Consortium of Youth CSOs in advocating for the enactment of the National Youth Council, which led to its inclusion in the proposed Constitution. In 2015, she led a girl-centred election campaign promoting participation in the general election with the Global Peace Foundation to advocate for a peaceful and inclusive election. In 2017, she contributed to the 28th AU Summit with a focus on youths, "Harnessing the Demographic Dividend by Investments in Youth". She spoke at the Aflatoun Global Meeting in Nairobi on using social media to integrate social and financial education in youth initiatives using technology.

In 2013, she was selected by the US embassy in Tanzania to attend International Visitors Leadership Program (IVLP). She won the 2017 inaugural IVLP alumni award for social innovation and change for her landmark win at the High Court.

In 2012, she was the ambassador and coordinator for the national campaign under the government through the Tanzania Education Authority (TEA). The campaign aimed to raise funds for the construction of girls’ hostels in eight regions in Tanzania and rescue girls who had to walk long distance to school, or drop out completely.

In October 2016, she spoke at UNICEF’s Global commemoration of the International Day of the Girl Child in New York and received the Social Change Award for her role in ending legal provisions allowing child marriage in Tanzania.

In 2016, she joined Melinda Gates in a panel discussion on young women's involvement in small-scale farming, addressing challenges and solutions.

In November 2016, Gyumi supported Girls Not Brides in global fundraising efforts to end child marriage. She is one of nine global members of the UNICEF–UNFPA advisory committee for the program to end child marriage. She also volunteers and serves as an ambassador for campaigns promoting safe schools and quality education in Tanzania.

She was named 2016 UNICEF global goals award winner for her work in advancing girls’ rights in Tanzania. She was named among the 2016 African Women of the Year by New African Woman magazine. Gyumi is a member of the World Economic Forum’s Global Shapers Community and a Young Leaders Fellow at the University of Cape Town.

== Awards and nominations ==
Year	Event	Prize	Result
2013	Tanzania Under 30 Youth Awards	Social Impact Category	Nominated
2016	United Nations Global Goals Awards	Social Change Award	Won
2017	International Visitors Leadership Program Alumni Awards	Social Innovation and Change Award	Won
	New Africa Woman Awards	New Africa Woman On The Rise	Nominated
	Clouds Fm Malkia Wa Nguvu Awards	Inspirational Icon	Won
2018	Tanzania Women of Achievement	Young Achiever Award	Won
2018	United Nations Headquarters New York Awards	United Nations Human Rights Prize	Won
2020	BBC	BBC 100 Inspiring women	
