= Girls Not Brides =

Organization seeking to end child marriage

- Established: 2011; 15 years ago
- Founders: The Elders
- Type: Non-governmental organization
- Legal status: Charity
- Headquarters: London, United Kingdom
- Website: www.girlsnotbrides.org

Girls Not Brides: The Global Partnership to End Child Marriage is an international non-governmental organization with the mission to end child marriage throughout the world. The organization was created by The Elders to enable small groups from around the world to address the common issue of early marriage.

Girls Not Brides works alongside governments to end child marriage. Raising public awareness of child marriage are the main goals of the national partnerships they have with Bangladesh, Ghana, Malawi, Mozambique, the Netherlands, Nepal, Uganda, the United Kingdom and the United States.

== History ==
The organization Girls Not Brides was started by The Elders in 2011 as a collaboration for organizations to work together to end child marriage. In October 2013, Girls Not Brides registered as an independent charity in England and Wales.

As of 2017, more than 700 organisations from over 85 countries are partnership members of Girls Not Brides. Less than 10 percent of partnership members are international organizations. Sixty-three percent of them focus their work in their own communities.

Girls Not Brides worked in 2017 to include ending child marriage in the United Nations Sustainable Development Goals for 2030.

In 2019 the organisations CEO became Faith Mwangi-Powell who was a Kenyan who had previously campaigned against FGM.

== Goals and strategies ==
Girls Not Brides say their goal is working towards ending child marriage, Girls Not Brides intends to work alongside and facilitate other organizations working towards the same goal. Ways they intend to combat child marriage are focused on information sharing through discussion and raising awareness in communities on any level (whether local, national, or international).

Girls Not Brides focused their 2017–2020 goals and strategies into six categories: Government, Global, Community, Funding, Learning, and Partnership. Government goals have adjusted from promoting national progress to making sure that high-prevalence countries are comprehensively undertaking child marriage. Girls Not Brides has also shifted their global goals from securing commitments to address child marriage into ensuring that the implementation of those commitments are supported by international and regional institutions. Community goals for Girls Not Brides centers on the importance of community-led approaches and the impact of community-based organizations. The organization's goals for funding tend to highlight dedicated resources in budgets and ensure an increase for community-based organizations. Girls Not Brides' final goal focuses on learning and research for child marriage and the effects of it, sharing the information, and ensuring that it is received and used in decision-making.
