= Playworld =

Playground equipment manufacturer

- Industry: Playground equipment
- Founded: 1971
- Headquarters: Lewisburg, Pennsylvania, United States
- Area served: Worldwide
- Key people: Matthew Miller, Chief Executive Officer; Dale Miller, Chairman
- Services: Park and playground design
- Number of employees: 300+
- Website: www.playworld.com

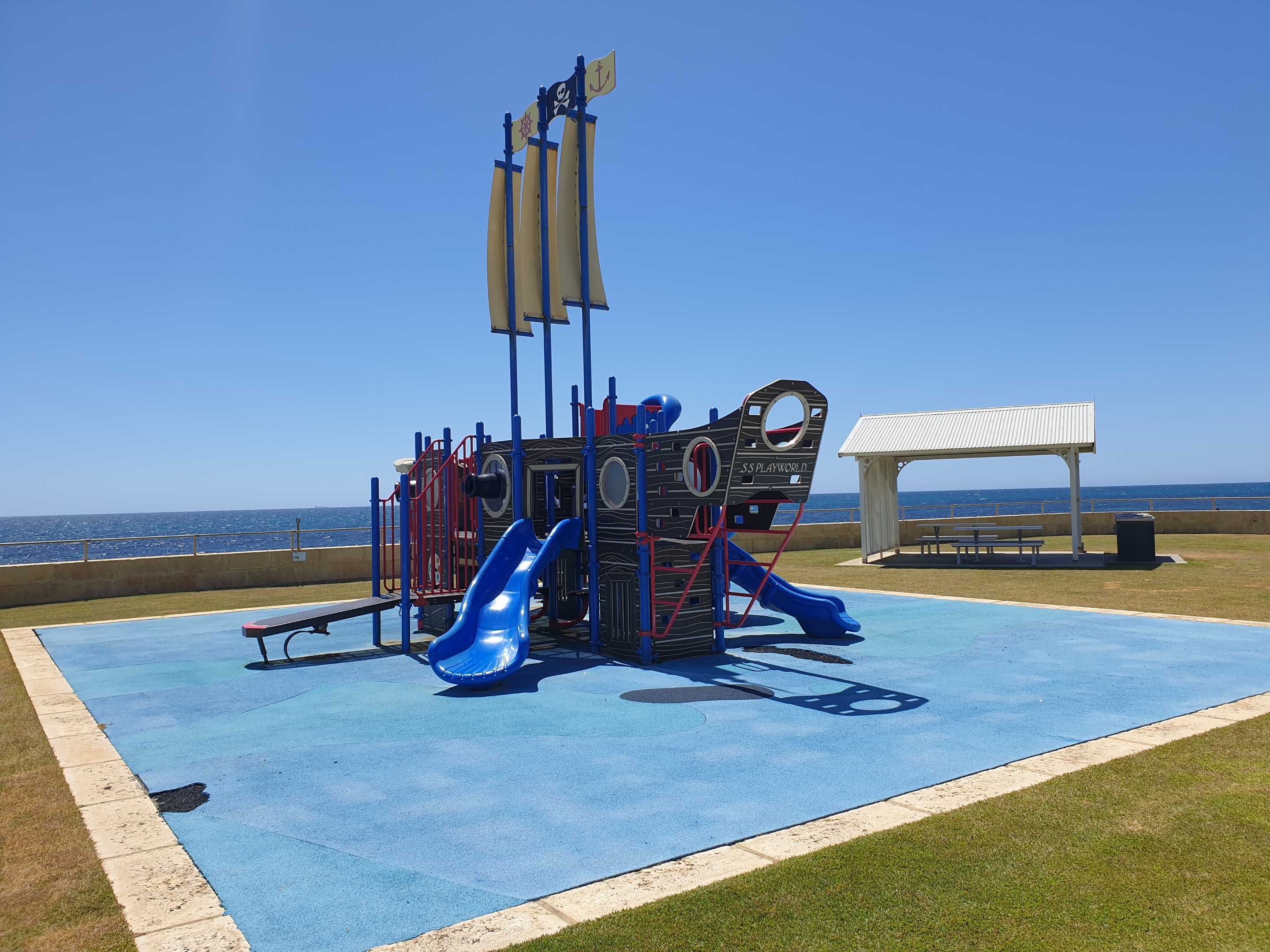
SS Playworld playground for kids

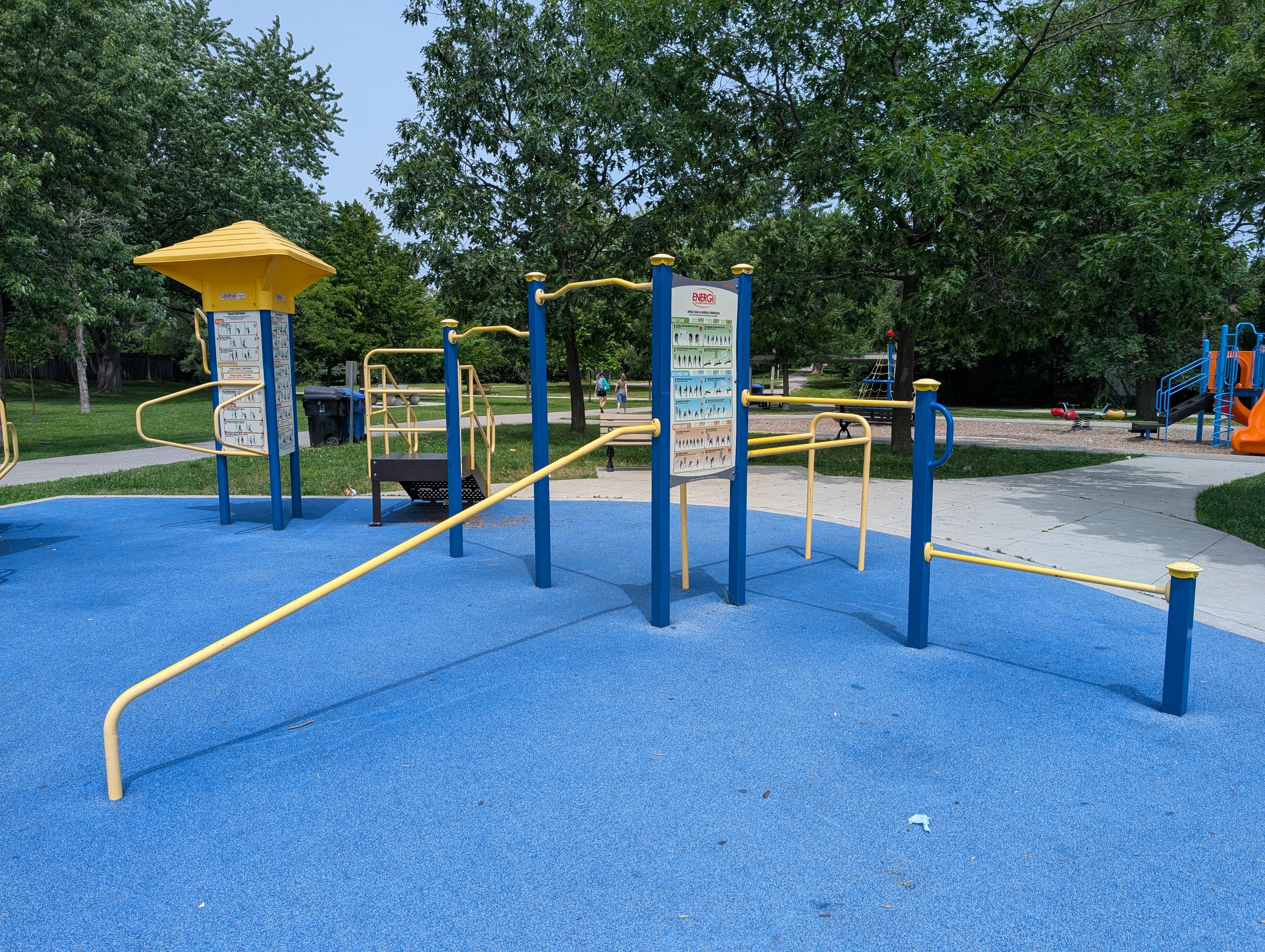
Playworld inclusive fitness stations at a senior playground in Toronto, Canada

Playworld Systems, Inc. is a worldwide commercial playground equipment manufacturer and surfacing provider based in Lewisburg, Pennsylvania.

== History ==
Playworld began in 1952 as QE Manufacturing Company, which made parts for heavy machinery. The company expanded its operations to playground equipment seven years later in 1959.

In 1971, Playworld Systems became its own company.

In January 1999, Playworld Systems moved to its current corporate headquarters in Lewisburg.

In 2007 Playworld launched NEOS, the world’s first outdoor electronic play system. The product promotes aerobic exercise with electronic games with the goal of bettering children’s health.

In 2011, Playworld became the first playground equipment manufacturer to earn Cradle to Cradle Silver Certification.

Today, Playworld has more than 300 employees with offices in London, England and China.

== Charitable Initiatives ==
In 1999, Playworld partnered with KaBOOM! to help build playgrounds for communities in need.

Since 2010, Playworld has donated research, resources, and facilities to Empower Playgrounds, Inc. to improve schools in Ghana. Playworld also provides equipment for the Healthy Weight Commitment Foundation’s Healthy Playground Makeover Sweepstakes each year.

In 2012, Playworld donated $50,000 of playground equipment to Detroit in honor of Joshua Smith, a young boy concerned with the city’s financial crisis.

In 2015, Playworld donated playground equipment to Joe Kneip Park in North Las Vegas.

In 2016, Playworld donated playground equipment to Camp Victory...A Special Camp for Special Kids, in Millville, PA.

== Awards ==
Governor’s ImPAct Award for Community Impact in Central Pennsylvania (2012)

General Services Administration Integrated Workplace Award for Sports Recreation (2012)

Kids at Play Interactive Innovation Award (2014)

Governor’s ImPAct Award for Community Impact in Central Pennsylvania (2015)
