= Aging in place =

Ability to live in one's home and community safely and independently regardless of age

The U.S. Centers for Disease Control and Prevention defines aging in place as "the ability to live in one's own home and community safely, independently, and comfortably, regardless of age, income, or ability level".

== Environmental gerontology ==
Research in environmental gerontology indicates the importance of the physical and social environment of housing and the neighborhood (public space), as well as its implications for aging in place.

== Preference ==
Most adults would prefer to age in place—that is, remain in their home of choice as long as possible. In fact, 90 percent of adults over the age of 65 report that they would prefer to stay in their current residence as they age. One-third of American households are home to one or more residents 60 years of age or older.

Technology can be an enabler for aging in place—there are four categories of technology that acts as an enabler—Communication and Engagement, Health and Wellness, Learning and Contribution, and Safety and Security. Caregiving technologies help those who care for older adults provide that care in the most effective way—and include new technologies for smart phones and tablets, as well as websites—such as Caring.com or AARP.org/Caregiving.

== Home modifications ==
There exist many risks for injury to older adults in the common household, therefore impacting upon their capability to successfully age in place. Among the greatest threats to an ability to age in place is falling. According to the CDC, falls are the leading cause of injurious death among older adults. Therefore, engagement in fall prevention is crucial to one's ability to age in place. Common features in an everyday household, such as a lack of support in the shower or bathroom, inadequate railings on the stairs, loose throw rugs, and obstructed pathways are all possible dangers to an older person. However, simple and low-cost modifications to an older person's home can greatly decrease the risk of falling, as well as decreasing the risk of other forms of injury. Consequently, this increases the likelihood that one can age in place.

Some examples of home modifications include: increased lighting, accessible switches at both ends of the stairs, additional railings, grab bars, nonskid flooring, a hand-held flexible shower head, walk-in bathtubs, and the removal of throw rugs and clutter. In most cases, home modifications can be simple and cost-effective, while simultaneously offering substantial benefits to the individual. Other modifications to the home – especially those that require retrofitting – are a little more costly due to increased complexity of installation. These can include: ramps for accessible entry and exit, walk-in shower, sliding shelves, stairlifts, or even home elevators. Many homes are built or retrofitted with the Universal design model in mind, which makes everything in the home accessible to all people with or without functional limitations.

== Resources in the community ==
Naturally occurring retirement communities, also known as NORCs, are another source of support for older adults wishing to age in place. A NORC, though not built specifically for a certain age demographic, occurs where a congregation of residents 60 and older live cooperatively. Some offer recreational activities, preventative health and social services for the community. This model can be supported by local, state, and federal dollars as well as community businesses, neighborhood associations and private foundations.

== Technological changes ==
In some cases, the caregivers of people who are aging in place seek to persuade them to adopt new technology, which may include learning new skills and changing their daily routine to incorporate the technology. As of 2014, there is research about how people aging in place try to use new technology when persuaded, but not much research about the extent to which they continue to use it after trying it for some time. Factors which contribute to the decision to try to use technology are the anticipated benefits of the technology, the difficulty using it, the extent to which the user feels that harm will come from not using it, the availability of alternatives, support from others in their social circle, and their own personal attitudes and disposition.

== Biological reasons ==
Many elders have difficulties with everyday functioning that require modifications to the houses or apartments they live in. There are several reasons why these changes happen:

- Motor functioning: In a 2002 study by Min Soo Kang, it was reported that of the elder population in America, 18% will have a disability. This calculates to 51 million Americans who have difficulties in functioning every day. 32% over age 65 will have difficulty walking, which may require use of walkers, wheelchairs and canes. To make life easier for the elder, some modifications that can aid them are wider entrances, grab rails, elevator chairs on stairs, etc.
- Fine motor functioning: Elders may have difficulty using their fingers, which can be problematic. As a result, modifications to handles, bathroom fixtures, etc. can aid with this problem.
- Cognitive functioning: It was reported in Kochera (2002) that 1 out of 5 people over the age of 55 will have a mental health disorder. Due to the deterioration, the five senses and cognitive capability decrease and cause slower responses. As a result, fire hazards may not be noticed, which can be very important when setting up fire alarms, exits, etc.

== Examples ==
Aging in place can be further defined by:

1. Aging in place without urgent needs: This group includes individuals who want to stay in their current home, are not experiencing immediate health/mobility issues, and prefer aging in place.
2. Aging in place with progressive condition-based needs: This group is made up of those with chronic or progressive conditions that will require special modifications for aging in place. These individuals are usually aware of their needs but meeting them is not necessarily urgent. Many have chronic conditions such as diabetes and lung/heart disease that challenge them.
3. Aging in place with traumatic change needs: This group includes those who experienced an abrupt or immediate change that demands adjustments in the living environment for aging in place such as home modifications or universal design.

== Careers in the field ==
By working with a person's regular physician and other doctors, an Occupational Therapist (OT) can suggest changes to be made to a person's home in order to uniquely compensate for that particular patient's capabilities and disabilities. By making an appointment and meeting with an Occupational Therapist, a patient is getting a one-on-one based session where the therapist is focused solely on that patient's limitations and is making strategies in order to modify the patient's home, making it safer and letting them keep their independence. OT's will work with contractors and occasionally local groups and volunteers to make home modifications ranging from small changes like better lighting to more extreme changes such as chair lifts instead of stairs. An OT will typically try to make low-cost adjustments in the initial stages, but once again this is based on each individual. OT's also provide services to older adults in community based scenarios focusing in health promotion.

== Initiatives worldwide ==
=== In Canada ===
In Ontario, Canada, aging in place is known as aging at home, and has received considerable financial support from the Ministry of Health and Long Term Care.

=== In United States ===
According to the United States Census, 46 million people age 65+ lived in the United States in 2014 and this same segment of the population will grow to 74 million in 2030.

Websites and organizations have sprung up all across the nation, in individual communities, states and nationwide to help people to remain in their own homes for as long as possible. Aging in Place is an initiative of Partners for Livable Communities and the National Association of Area Agencies on Aging. It was developed to help America's communities prepare for the aging of their population and to become places that are good to grow up, live in and grow old. They have been working directly with nine laboratory communities to assist them in advancing policies, programs and services to promote Aging in Place. A similar network is the Elder Villages.

Smart homes are also another development to help promote aging in place by integrating a range of monitoring and supportive devices. These homes have technology for physiological monitoring, functional monitoring for emergency detection and response, safety monitoring and assistance, security monitoring and assistance, social interaction monitoring and assistance and cognitive and sensory assistance.

Georgia Institute of Technology has developed a smart house. This house would help to address issues older adults face when living alone, such as physical and mental decline as well as awareness for family members. The house includes technology such as pendants which understand commands in the form of hand gestures. It could open and lock doors, close blinds, turn on lights, and more. There is also an in-home monitoring system that can inform family members about an older relative's daily activities, health status, and potential problems. This would allow older adults to remain in their own home while still maintaining their independence without their families having to worry about their well-being. This is not the only smart house that has popped up. The University of Florida has created one as well. It has smart refrigerators and pantries which can detect food consumption and expired products. Their smart laundry machines can coordinate with the smart closet to notify the resident when it is time to do laundry as well as aid in sorting the laundry. Every room is specially designed with these and many more smart features to aid their living situation.

Similar technology has been done at the Washington State University, University of Texas, University of Massachusetts, Massachusetts Institute of Technology, University of Missouri, as well as in Osaka, Japan.

In December 2011, AARP Policy Institute and the National Conference of State Legislatures released a report entitled, "Aging in Place: A State Survey of Livability Policies and Practices" to foster aging in place by giving state legislators examples of how laws, policies and programs can support this goal. In addition to such governmental initiatives, livability can be optimized through the incorporation of universal design principles, telecare and other assistive technologies. Assistive technologies include communications, health and wellness monitoring, home safety and security. Semico Research published a report in July 2013 claiming the health and wellness monitoring market for Aging in Place will reach $30 billion by 2017.

The Program of All-Inclusive Care for the Elderly (PACE) model was created in the early 1970s in order to meet the chronic care needs of older people through their community. As an assistance program, one must be at least 55 years of age, certified by their state to need nursing home care, are able to live safely in the community at the time of enrollment, and live in a PACE service area. The goal of the PACE program is to care for the chronic care needs of older individuals while providing them with the ability to live independently, or age in place in their homes, for as long as possible. In order to make independent living possible for this population, the PACE program provides services, such as physical therapy, respite care, prescription drugs, social services, nutritional counseling, and much more. Since 2011, PACE has 82 operational programs in 29 states, and is continuing to expand today.

=== In Middle Eastern and Asian countries ===
For many countries in the Middle and Far East, it is part of the cultural beliefs for older adults to age in place. Many children believe it to be their duty to care for their parents as they age and therefore will move in with their parents when their assistance is needed. In many Middle Eastern countries, nursing homes are just recently coming into existence due to cultural and generational shifts towards Western values.

=== In Hong Kong ===
Smart facilities are provided in some housing estates serve the elderly. In one of the ageing-in-place housing estates, a smart device tracks door movement every 24 hours to make sure the tenants of the apartment building are awake and attentive. If not, a notification will be sent to the control center asking for emergency assistance. Each day, tenants are allowed to monitor and record their body temperatures, heart rates, and blood pressure. An alarm will be sent when a tenant's health information departs from pre-set personal boundaries, and the duty nurse will take action after examining the findings. A sensor checks the motion of the unit to see if the tenants have been idle for eight hours straight before sending a call for emergency help to the control centre.

== See also ==
- Accessibility (transport)
- Aging
- Assisted living
- Elder village
- Friendly caller program
- Home care
- Nursing home
- Senior exercise park
- Reminiscence therapy
- Retirement community
- Transgenerational design
- Urban vitality
