= Outdoor gym =

Gym equipment in a public outdoor location

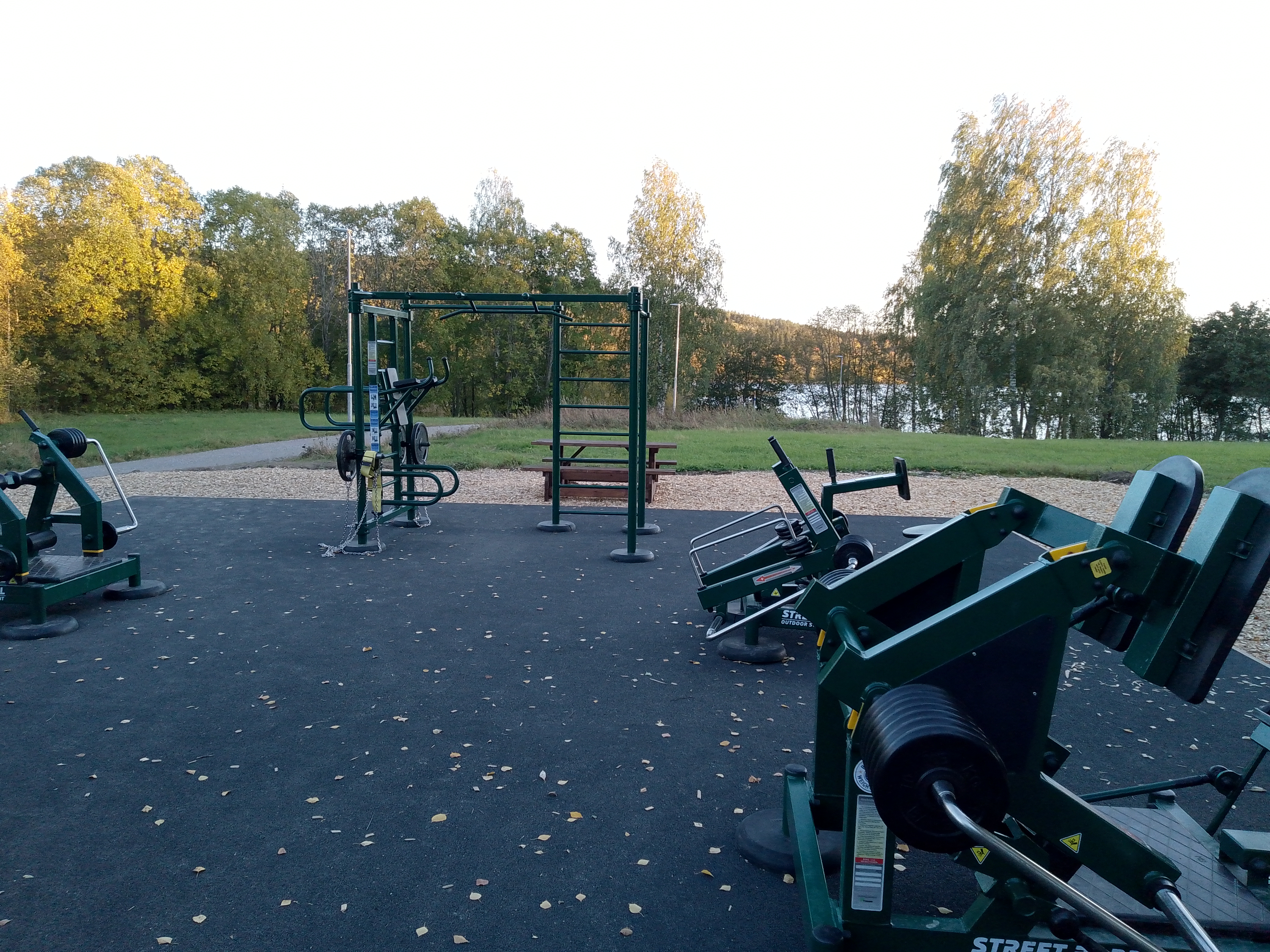
An outdoor gym with weights in Sweden

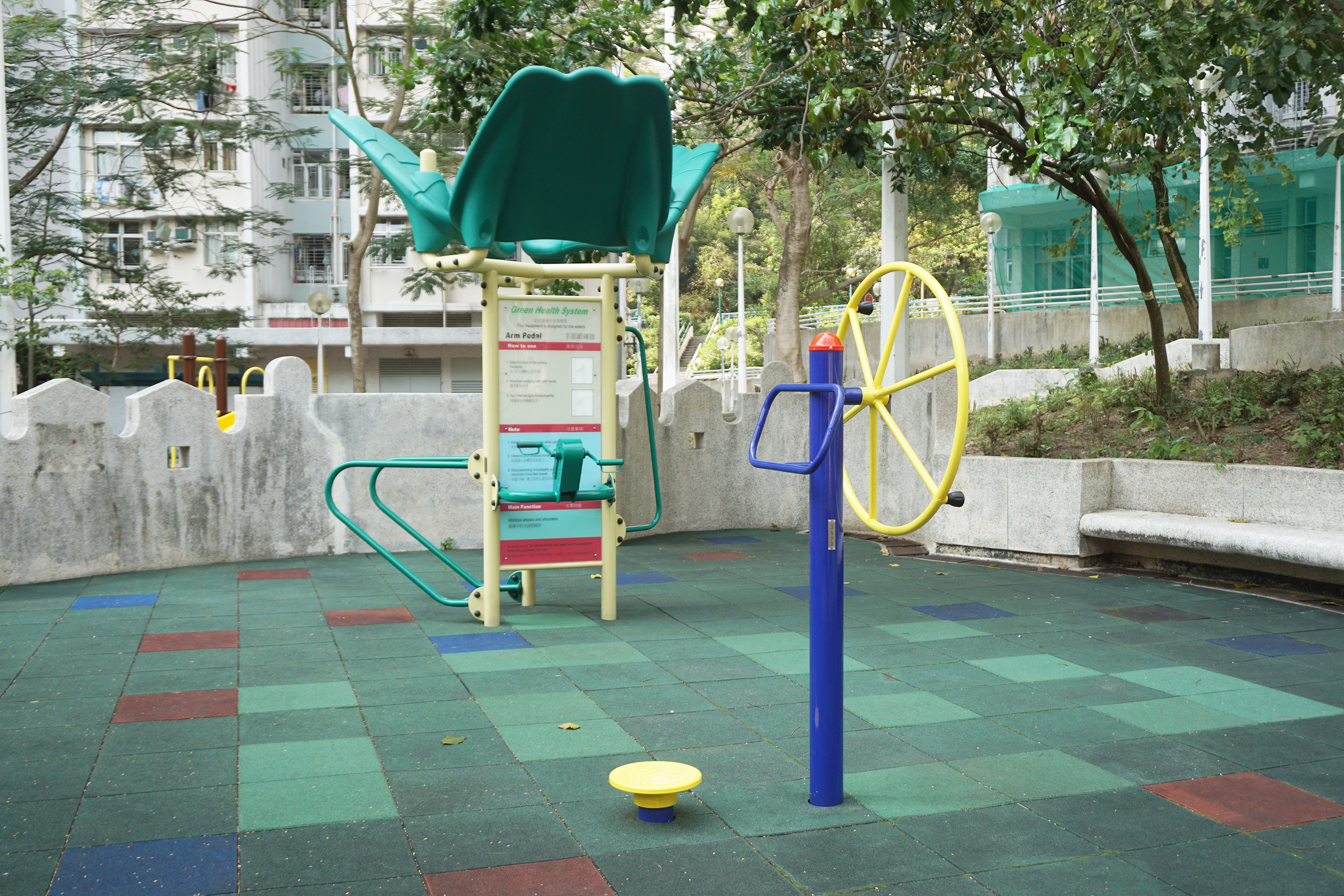
Facilities for elderly people

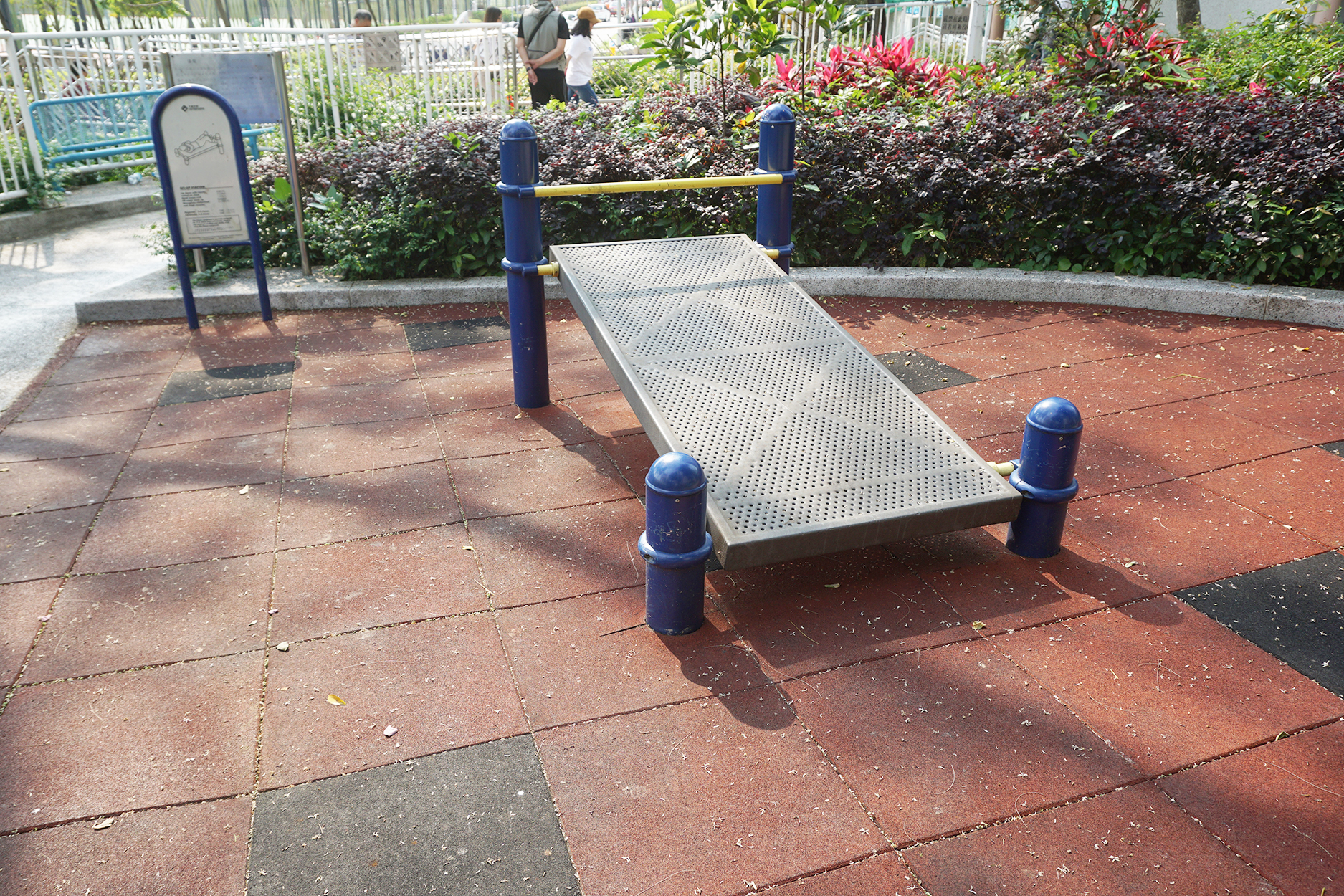
Sit-up station in a public housing estate, Hong Kong

An outdoor gym is a gym built outside in a public park, with all-weather construction of its exercise machines somewhat modeled on playground equipment. It is similar to the 1960s–1970s proliferation of fitness trails, which continue to be created particularly in the US and Europe. In some instances, trails used for fitness are referred to as outdoor gyms.

== Types of outdoor gym equipment ==
Types of outdoor gym equipment may vary according to the nature of parks, locality and the visitors. There is no fixed list as which can include all of the machines or fixtures used in different parts of the world for outdoor recreation. These fixtures or machines can also be categorized into strength training and simple fitness or resistance training. Some basic outdoor exercising installations used commonly all over the world are pullup bars, balancing beams, parallel dip bars, etc.

== By country ==
=== Australia ===
Outdoor gyms have become increasingly common in the Australia, where they are usually installed in public parks and at beaches.

=== China ===
Outdoor gyms have been used in China as a national fitness campaign prior to the 2008 Summer Olympics. The government has rolled out over 20,000,000 square metres (220,000,000 sq ft) of outdoor gym facilities across China Currently a third of the sports lottery is dedicated to funding this concept. In China they have a similar survey to the Active People Survey. The participation levels in physical activity have been steadily on the increase since the outdoor gym concept has been introduced to China..

=== India ===
Outdoor gyms are starting to trend in New Delhi, India, where traditional gyms have had low popularity. In 2012 the New Delhi Municipal Council (NDMC) installed 40 sets around the area, surrounding municipalities have followed suit.

=== Spain ===
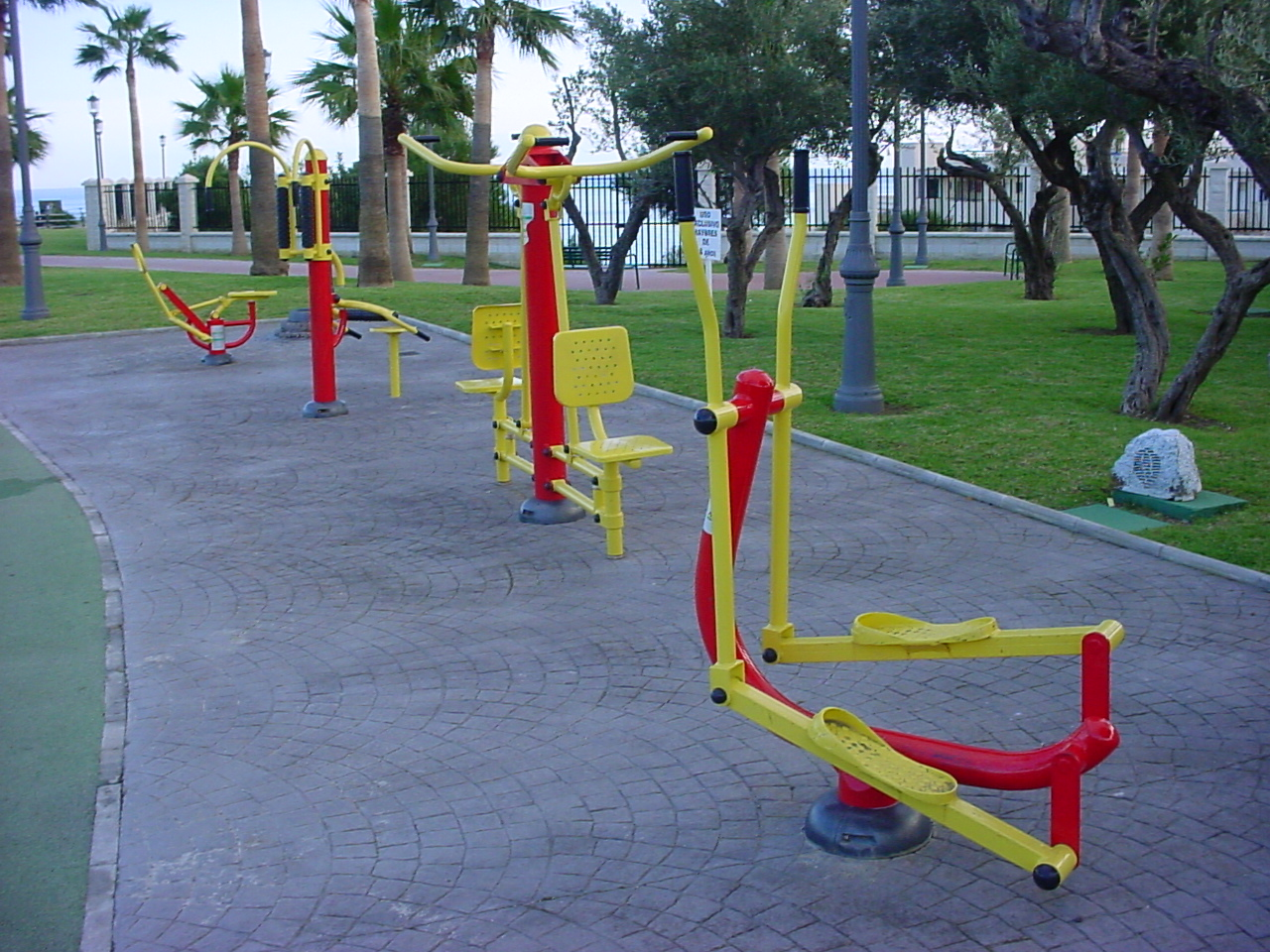
Outdoor gym in Torremolinos, Spain

There are a number of outdoor gyms located around Spain. In 2021, outdoor fitness company Vivepark trialled two temporary outdoor gyms in La Alcaidesa and Benalmádena, with plans for a permanent location in the future.

=== United Kingdom ===
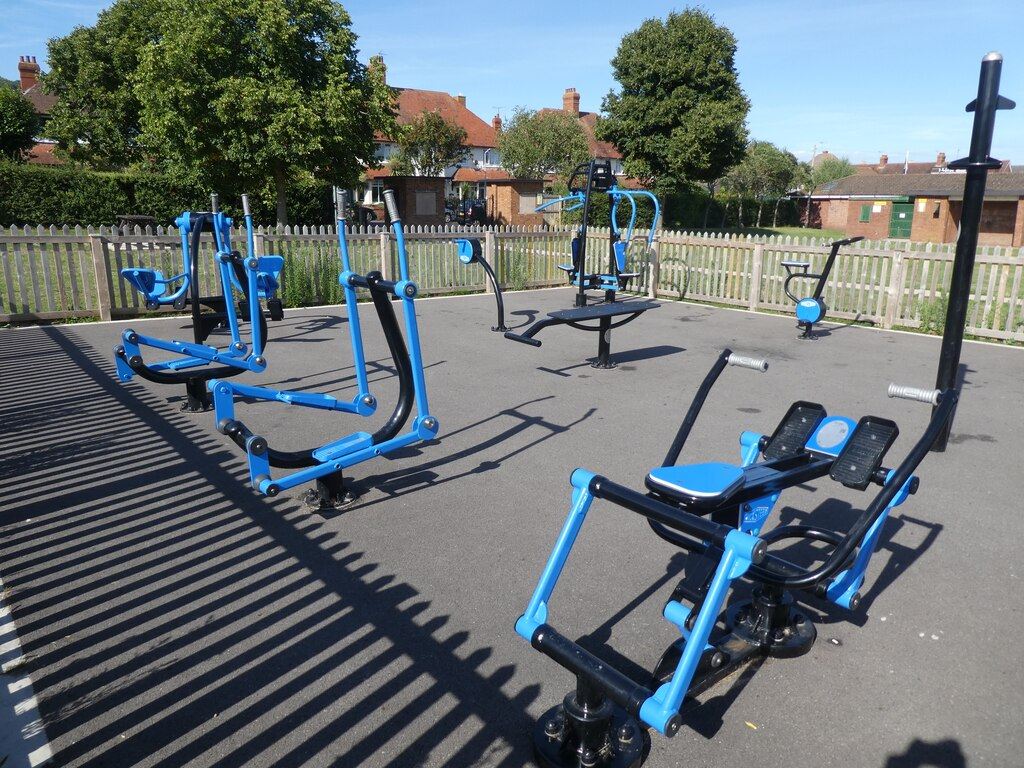
A suburban outdoor gym in Minehead, Somerset

Outdoor gyms have become increasingly common in the United Kingdom, where they are usually installed in public parks and school playgrounds. There have been over 400 such spaces installed in the United Kingdom since 2007 by one of the main providers of these spaces.

== See also ==
- Senior exercise park
- Calisthenics
- Chin-up bar
- Fitness trail
- Leg press
- Obstacle course
- Outdoor fitness
- Parkour
