= Elder village =

In gerontology, an Elder Village or Senior Village (occasionally "virtual village", and usually shortened to "Village") is an organization, usually staffed by volunteers (often with a small paid staff), that provides services to the elderly in order to allow them to remain in their homes as they age. Villages are a part of the "aging in place" movement, and are found in the United States, Canada, Australia, and the Netherlands, as well as South Korea and Finland.

Most Villages have members, to whom they provide services upon request. Services offered typically include transportation, light home maintenance and repair, and social activities. Most Villages do not provide medical services or involved home maintenance, but provide referrals to those who do.

== History ==
The first formal Village was founded in the Beacon Hill neighborhood of Boston in 2001. Approximately one dozen residents of the historic neighborhood wanted "to remain at home" once transportation and household chores became difficult, dangerous, or even impossible. They also wished to avoid becoming dependent on their children, but did not want to move to an old-age facility. They founded an organization to provide these services to the organization's members, who must live in Beacon Hill or the adjacent Back Bay neighborhood. The result has been called an "intentional community" or a "virtual retirement community".

The organization grew slowly, learning from its mistakes. After four years in existence, Beacon Hill Village was the subject of an article in The New York Times, and the idea spread. Beacon Hill Village prepared a how-to manual for sale to those who would found other Villages. By 2010, there were more than 50 Villages in the United States. As of 2012, there were some 90 Villages in operation in the United States, Canada, Australia, and the Netherlands, with more than 120 other Villages in the formation process. By 2018, the idea had spread as far as South Korea and Finland. By 2019, there were 280 Villages in the United States.

== Operation ==
A Village tends to be formed as a non-profit corporation, with members, directors, and officers. Most are qualified as charitable organizations. They may or may not have paid staff, a regular office, and other business trappings.

Villages are largely funded through membership dues and fees, on the one hand, and donations and grants, on the other. Some 90% of American Villages charge dues, but some charge no dues. They provide such services as transportation, grocery delivery, light home repairs, and dog walking, as well as organizing social activities. They typically pool the resources of a community in providing services. Most Villages do not provide medical services or involved home maintenance, but provide referrals to those who do. Village staff and volunteers might select and screen these outside providers, and can help coordinate members' appointments with them. Providers so identified may offer their services to Village members at reduced rates.

Villages tend to operate on one of three models. The first, pioneered in the 1990s by Community Without Walls in Princeton, N.J., has numerous members, each of whom belongs to one of a number of "houses". Annual dues are very low or non-existent, and much of the activity of such a group is social. Nearly all services are provided by volunteers. Members pay additional dues for further assistance and services needed. The second form delivers both volunteer and paid help. Dues are higher (and often subsidized for low-income members), and the level of services (which are typically provided without additional charge) tends to be more comprehensive. This has been termed the "classic village model". A third model amounts to being a service exchange. One member might pick up groceries for a neighbor; a second volunteer might then fix the first's leaky faucet. Historically, Villages have tended to operate in urban areas, with significant concentrations of both service providers and recipients, but they are spreading. Many experts believe that the second model, with both paid staff and volunteers, has the most widespread applicability. Currently, Villages are largely found in middle-class and upper-income neighborhoods; the movement has received some criticism for its perceived failure to reach more diverse communities to date. The Washington, D.C., area, with its large proportion of people who moved from elsewhere and thus do not have a local family network, has a particularly high concentration of Villages; the District of Columbia Office on Aging has a Web page dedicated to "Senior Villages" and has produced a "how to" guide for establishing a new Village.

The issue of sustainability, with the related issue of growth, has arisen in a number of Villages. In some, the founders have been surprised at the difficulty they experience in their efforts to expand membership beyond the initial group, which can impair efforts to grow the membership to the point at which a Village can become self-sustaining. Many people approached by a Village do not feel ready to join, while the people most in need of a Village's services are less likely to hear about them.

Individual Villages may share ideas and experiences through the Village to Village ("VtV") network. VtV was established in 2010 by Beacon Hill Village and Capital Impact in response to requests from a number of Villages. At the end of 2014, Capital Impact withdrew from the partnership and in March 2015, the organization, formally organized as a limited liability company, was converted to a corporation, named Village to Village Network, Inc. It serves as a clearinghouse for inter-Village communications, and provides information to help communities establish and operate their own Villages. It further organizes an annual meeting, the National Village Gathering, at which local Village officers and staffers may meet those from other Villages to share information and experiences.

The Beacon Hill Village in Boston began as a community of older adults joining forces to create "programs and services that will enable them to live at home, remaining independent as long as possible." The ‘Village’ model for aging in place is based on the Beacon Hill Village established in Boston in 2001. The ‘Village’ model is a grassroots, consumer driven, and volunteer first model. The ‘Village’ is a self-governed organization of older adults who have identified their desire to age in place. The model relies on informal network of community members. Volunteers are the backbone of the model, while the ‘Village’ staff is responsible for administration including vetting, training, and management of volunteers. Vendors provide home health care and professional home repairs. Volunteers provide transportation, shopping, household chores, gardening, and light home maintenance. The ‘Village’ model relies on the collective abilities of the community to respond to challenges face in the aging process. The ‘Village’ also works to build a shared sense of community through social activities including potluck dinners, book clubs, and educational programs. As of 2010, there were over 50 fully operational ‘Villages’ and nearly 149 in the developmental stage. By 2015, the Village to Village Network had 251 member organizations, accounting for approximately 25,000 service-receiving members.

== Links ==
- Village to Village Network
- PBS Newshour report
- Helpful Village
