= Senior exercise park =

Outdoor exercise space designed for older adults

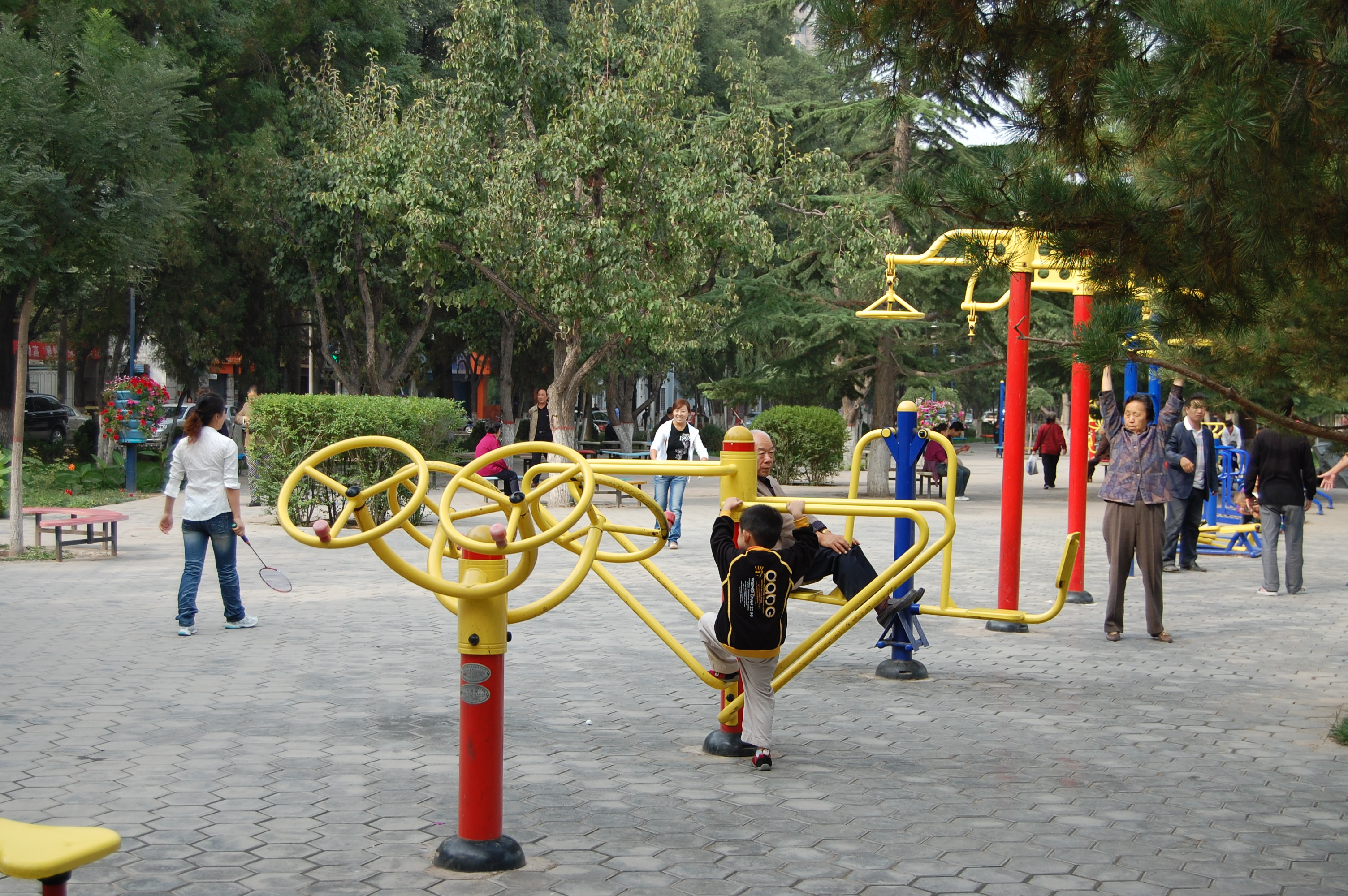
Outdoor exercise equipment for seniors in Lanzhou, China. "Tai chi spinners" are a common example of exercise equipment for seniors

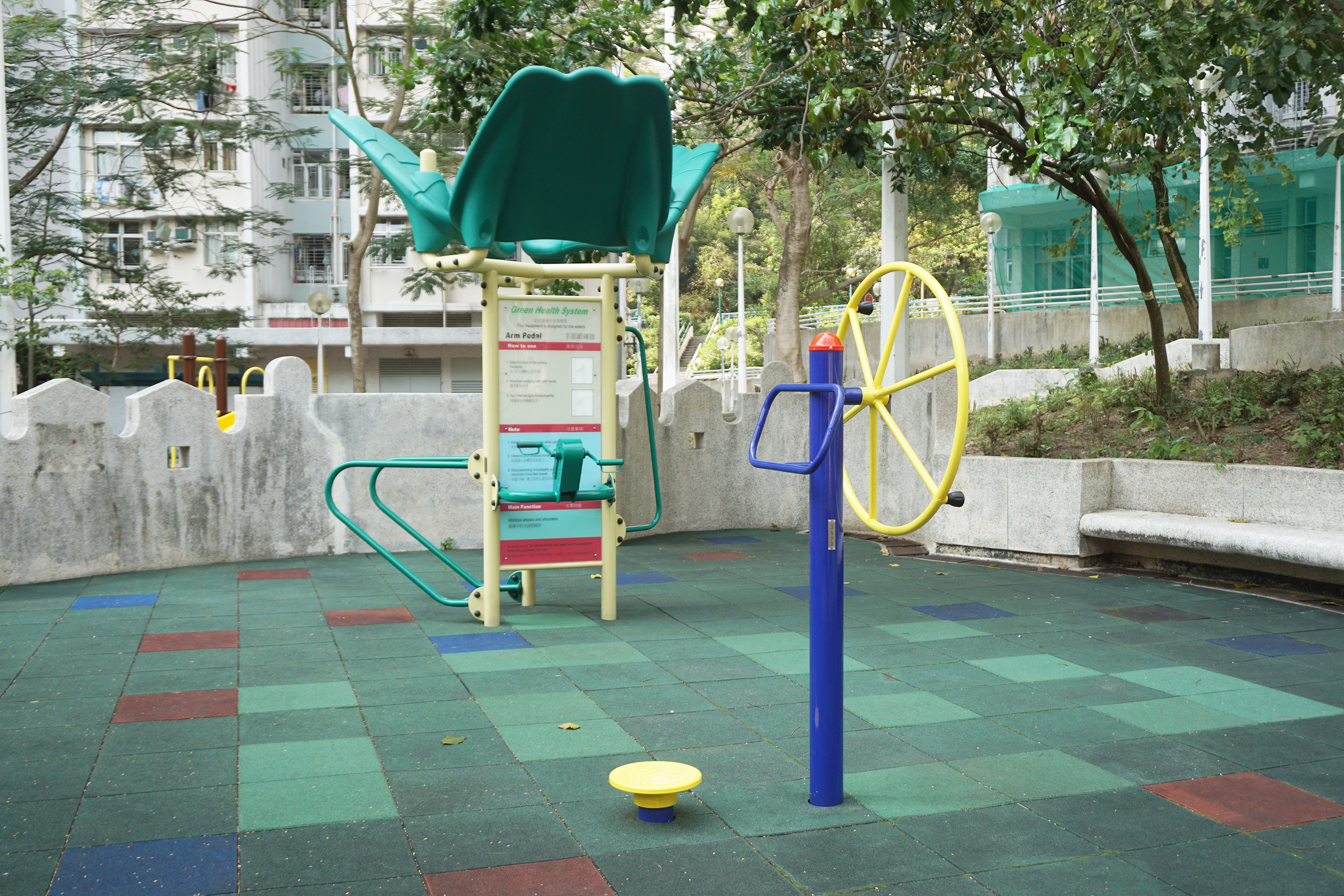
Facilities for elderly people in Hong Kong featuring "arm pedal" equipment

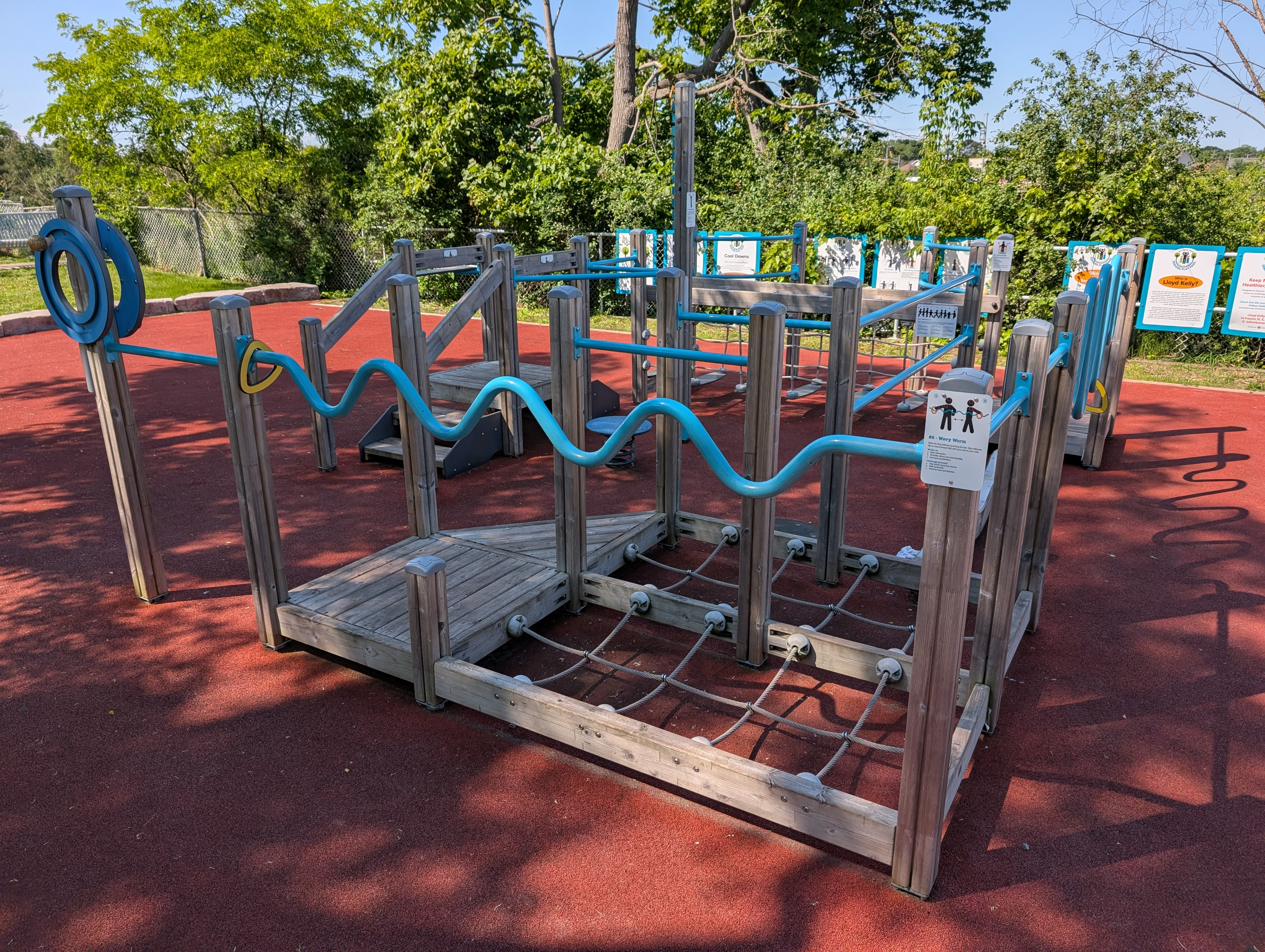
"55+ Seniors Play Park" in Ontario, Canada

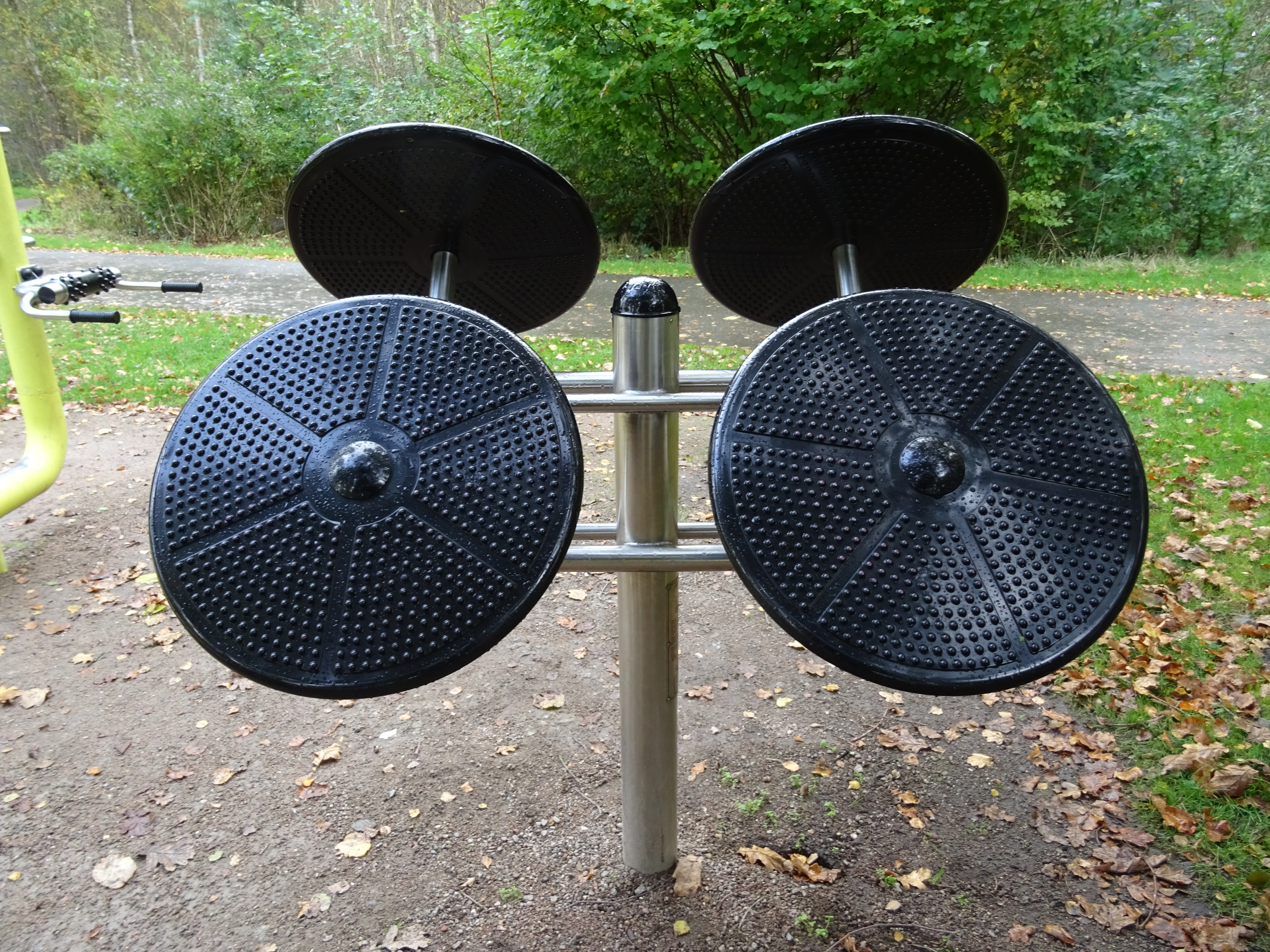
"Tai chi spinners" in Germany

A senior exercise park — also known as a senior playground, geriatric fitness zone, or outdoor fitness park for older adults — is an outdoor recreational space fitted with low-impact exercise equipment adapted to the physical needs of older adults, typically people aged 50, 55, 60 or 65 and above depending on the jurisdiction.

Unlike a conventional outdoor gym, which is generally designed for general-purpose fitness and tends to be used mostly by younger and middle-aged adults through equipment such as pull-up bars and parallel dip bars, senior exercise parks emphasise balance, joint mobility, low-impact cardiovascular conditioning and social interaction, and typically add handrails, wider clearances, seating and equipment that can be used from a seated or supported position.

The concept emerged from national fitness campaigns in China in the mid-1990s and subsequently spread to Europe, North America and other parts of Asia, where it has been adapted under a variety of local names and design philosophies.

== History ==
The earliest outdoor exercise installations aimed at older citizens are usually traced to China, where a national fitness law in the mid-1990s led to public parks being equipped with equipment usable by residents of all ages, including elderly citizens, ahead of the 2008 Summer Olympics.

Tokyo began installing so-called "Nursing Care Prevention Parks" in 2004, featuring workout stations styled with the bright colours and obstacle-course-like movements of children's playground equipment, alongside classes on correct use run by groups such as the Association of Physical Fitness Promotion and Guidance and funded by local government.

In Finland, researchers at Rovaniemi Polytechnic and the University of Lapland built a prototype exercise park for older adults and studied its effects on a group of 40 participants aged 65 to 81. After three months of regular use, the study reported improvements in balance, gait speed and coordination, and was published in 2006.

A 2013 academic study of older users of outdoor fitness equipment at two Taiwanese public parks found that while exercise was not usually visitors' main reason for going to the park, most reported physical, psychological and social benefits from using the equipment.

== Design and equipment ==
Reviewers of senior-specific outdoor exercise spaces recommend that equipment be selected to address several domains at once: cardiorespiratory fitness, skeletal-muscle strength, functional mobility, agility, flexibility and range of motion, rather than the strength- and calisthenics-oriented equipment common in general-purpose outdoor gyms. Typical apparatus includes recumbent or hand-crank cycles, elliptical "walker" machines, body flexors and rotating discs for the torso and shoulders, leg-press and leg-stretch stations, balance beams, and seesaws, usually built lower to the ground and fitted with handrails or backrests.

Safety and accessibility features frequently associated with senior exercise parks include shock-absorbing or rubberised surfacing, level (curb-free) access, and seating and shade near the equipment. A facility opened inside Seoul's Children's Grand Park in 2025, for example, was reported to include hand-cycle stations for upper-body strength and "stepping-stone" paths intended to aid cognitive function, laid on barrier-free rubber flooring usable by wheelchair users as well as older adults. The 2018 Australian review of the concept identified design and equipment selection, along with a lack of standardised guidance for planners, as a key ongoing challenge for the field.

Because indoor fitness clubs are often perceived by older adults as loud, intimidating or oriented toward younger clientele, commentators and older users themselves have called for more spaces – both outdoor and indoor – purpose-built for older exercisers; in China, this has led to a small number of specialised commercial and community senior fitness clubs alongside outdoor installations.

== By country ==
=== Australia ===
Researchers at Australia's National Ageing Research Institute, Victoria University, Queensland University of Technology and Monash University published a 2018 review of the evidence base, challenges and future directions for the "senior exercise park". The same research group went on to develop the ENJOY Seniors Exercise Park programme, pairing outdoor exercise-park equipment installed in public spaces, retirement villages and aged-care facilities with structured group classes; a translational study published in BMC Geriatrics in 2020 reported improvements in physical and social health among community-dwelling older adults using the model. Local governments such as the City of Merri-bek in Victoria maintain dedicated seniors' exercise parks based on the model.

=== Canada ===
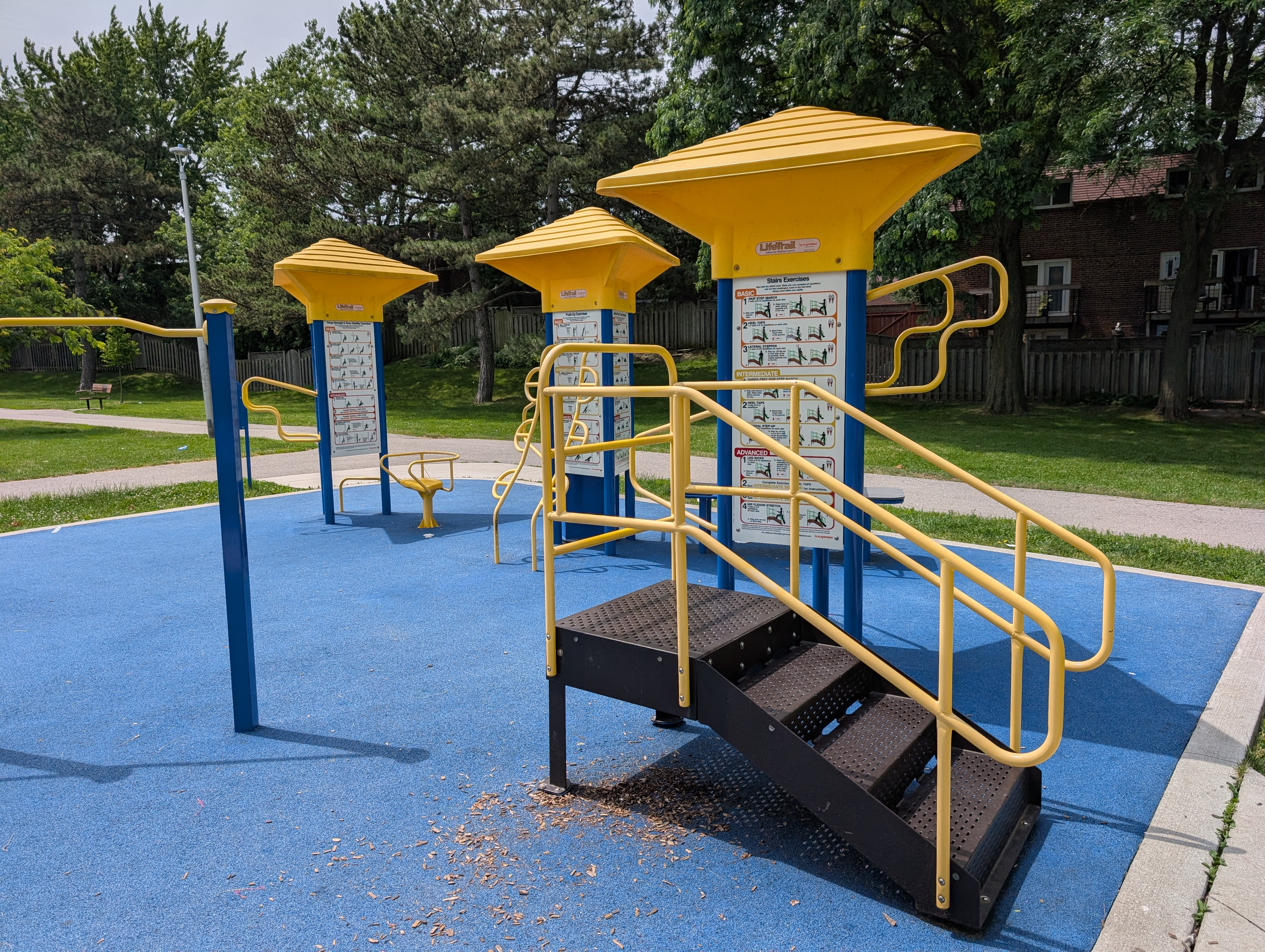
Seniors exercise equipment in Toronto

Modeled after the Chinese senior playgrounds, Lion Wellness Park in Delta, British Columbia, opened in 2007, has increased exercise rates among local elderly residents. It has been replicated in 18 other locations around British Columbia. By 2010, British Columbia had spent an estimated $2 million (Canadian) on outdoor playgrounds for older adults, according to the International Council on Active Aging, a Vancouver-based industry body.

=== China ===
China is generally credited as the origin of the wider concept: a national fitness law in the mid-1990s led to outdoor exercise equipment, including equipment usable by elderly residents, being installed across public parks nationwide ahead of the 2008 Beijing Olympics. More recently, professionals and older adults have called for gyms and clubs designed specifically for seniors, citing indoor facilities that are too loud or oriented toward younger clientele; examples include a dedicated seniors' gym opened in Nanjing's Jiaye community in 2019 and a chain of senior-focused fitness clubs operated by Shanghai-based Shangti Health Technology.

=== Germany ===
Germany's first dedicated facility of this kind opened in Schöningen, Lower Saxony, on 19 June 1999, built on a disused municipal garden plot with donations from local businesses, banks and residents, and is still known locally by the older term Seniorenspielplatz ("senior playground"). The concept subsequently spread to other German cities, including Nuremberg, where officials favoured social and low-intensity elements such as lawn bowling and a giant outdoor chess set over more athletic options like a jogging track or trampoline, and Berlin's Neukölln district, where a facility was restricted to residents aged 65 and over unless accompanied by a doctor or pharmacist.

=== Japan ===
Tokyo began opening government-funded "Nursing Care Prevention Parks" in 2004, aimed at maintaining mobility among Japan's large older population; the parks combine brightly coloured, playground-styled equipment with organised instruction on correct use.

=== Spain ===
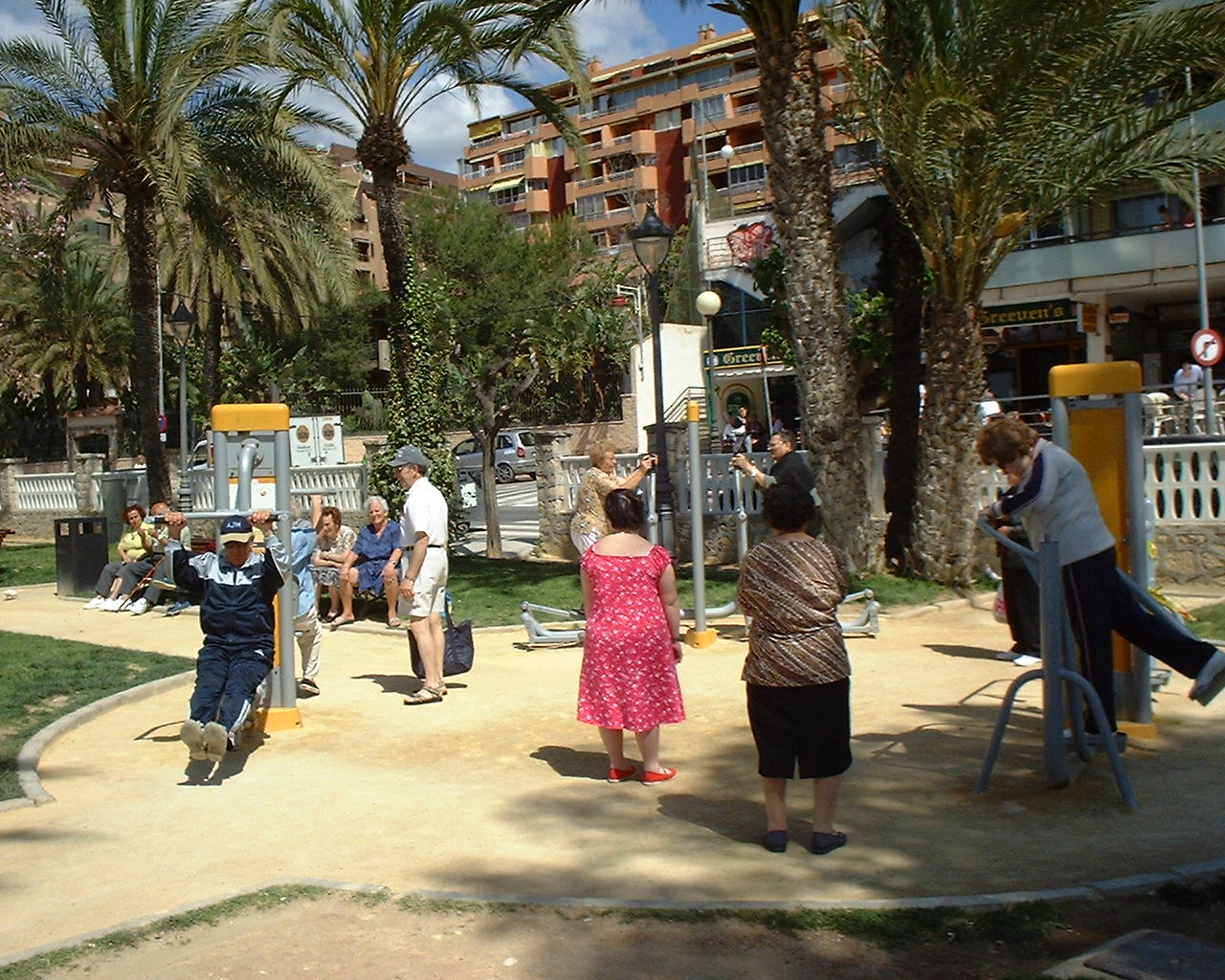
Senior playground in Benidorm, Spain

The province of Málaga has installed more than 400 senior playgrounds since 2007, one of the largest such programs in the world, though a University of Málaga researcher has found many are underused because of poor site selection and equipment choices. Despite this, an estimated 50,000 people had been reported to use Málaga's senior playgrounds each week.

=== South Korea ===
In South Korea, the first "senior playground" (노인놀이터) is reported to have opened in Gongju, South Chungcheong Province, in 2021; the model was adopted by Seoul's Guro District in 2022 and, as of late 2025, the city government was extending the format to all 25 of its districts.

=== United Kingdom ===
The United Kingdom's first "senior playground" facility opened in Dam Head Park, Blackley, Manchester, in 2008, built by a residents' association and aimed at people aged 65 and over, with equipment including skiing and pressing machines and stations for pull-ups, push-ups and pedalling. A second, more widely publicised UK installation opened in London's Hyde Park in May 2012: a six-piece facility supplied by the Danish manufacturer Kompan and aimed at adults aged 50 and over, funded through Westminster City Council's ward budget scheme after a proposal from the Knightsbridge Association residents' group.

=== United States ===
AARP began building a network of outdoor fitness parks for adults, with a particular focus on engaging people over 50, to mark its 60th anniversary in 2018; working with local parks departments and the non-profit FitLot, it completed one park in each state plus the District of Columbia, Puerto Rico and the US Virgin Islands (53 parks in total) by 2021. Unlike many senior-specific facilities elsewhere, AARP's parks impose no minimum age and are generally sited next to, rather than separated from, children's playgrounds, with AARP staff describing the intergenerational use of adjoining facilities as a deliberate design goal.

== Benefits and research ==
Findings on the health effects of senior exercise parks are mixed. The original Finnish prototype study reported measurable gains in balance, gait speed and coordination after three months of regular use, alongside self-reported improvements in mood and confidence. A 2013 qualitative study of park users in Taiwan similarly reported perceived physical, psychological and social benefits, even though few visitors described exercise as their main reason for visiting the park. A 2018 Australian review noted that, at the time, research into the design, use and effectiveness of these spaces remained limited, and called for more rigorous study. Preliminary results from the subsequent ENJOY Seniors Exercise Park program, which combines equipment with structured classes, suggested benefits for both physical and social health and some evidence of reduced falls.

A 2021 systematic review and meta-analysis in the Journal of Aging and Physical Activity, however, found only nine eligible studies overall and reported no statistically significant improvement on standard physical-performance measures such as the 30-second chair-stand test and single-leg stance, while noting that older adults nonetheless valued the health and social-interaction benefits they associated with using the parks. Reviewers have generally concluded that evidence for social and psychological benefits of senior exercise parks is stronger and more consistent than evidence for measurable physical-performance gains.

== See also ==
- Outdoor gym
- Fitness trail
- Active ageing
- Aging in place
- Playground
- Calisthenics
