= Hale Zukas =

American disability rights activist (1943–2022)

- Born: Hale J. Zukas; May 31, 1943; Los Angeles, California, U.S.
- Died: November 30, 2022 (aged 79)
- Occupations: Author, accessibility consultant
- Known for: Disability rights activist
- Movement: Disability rights movement

Hale J. Zukas (May 31, 1943 – November 30, 2022) was an American disability rights activist. He was a member of the Rolling Quads at the University of California, Berkeley, and a founder of the first Center for Independent Living (CIL) in Berkeley. He was active in working for accessible streets and public transit, and in the creation of the Americans with Disabilities Act of 1990.

== Early life and education ==
Zukas was born in Los Angeles and educated in San Luis Obispo, California. He was diagnosed with cerebral palsy as a child. He learned to use an electric wheelchair and communicate using a helmet-mounted pointer to point to a letter board. He earned a B.A. in mathematics at the University of California, Berkeley in 1971.

== Activism and career ==
Zukas joined the Rolling Quads, a group of students at the University of California, Berkeley in the mid-1960s. The university was amongst the first in the world to begin admitting people with physical disabilities, including prominent activist Ed Roberts. The university began the Cowell Residence Program (CRP) at Cowell Memorial Hospital to provide housing and assistance, and the Rolling Quads were a group of students in the CRP who organized to advocate for the rights of students with disabilities. Zukas became one of the founders of the Physically Disabled Students Program on the Berkeley campus.

In 1972, Zukas, Roberts, and others founded the Center for Independent Living, Berkeley (CIL). He served as the CIL's first Coordinator of Community Affairs and held that position until 1982.

Zukas became a leading advocate for the elimination of architectural and transportation barriers, especially on the Bay Area Rapid Transit (BART) system in the San Francisco Bay area. The CIL led a movement in Berkeley to install curb cuts up and down Telegraph and Shattuck Avenues creating an extensive path of travel for wheelchair riders. In 1973, during protests for the ratification of section 504 of the Rehabilitation Act, prohibiting discrimination on the basis of disability, Zukas was one of the leaders of the movement, chosen along with other activists to lobby in Washington D.C. and confront the Carter Administration.

Zukas co-founded the BART's accessibility advisory group in 1975. He was a driving force in designing the button placement inside BART elevators at a height that could easily be reached by wheelchair users.

Zukas worked on the Americans with Disabilities Act of 1990. He was on the board of Transit Accessibility which meets monthly to discuss ways to make public transportation available to more people. Zukas became the vice chair of the United States Architectural and Transportation Barriers Compliance Board in 1983.

Zukas died on November 30, 2022, at the age of 79.

== Popular culture ==
In the 2026 Judith Heumann biopic, Being Heumann, which covers the Section 504 sit-ins, he is portrayed by Andrew Pilkington.
