= 50 United Nations Plaza Federal Office Building (San Francisco) =

- Federal Office Building
- U.S. National Register of Historic Places
- U.S. Historic district – Contributing property
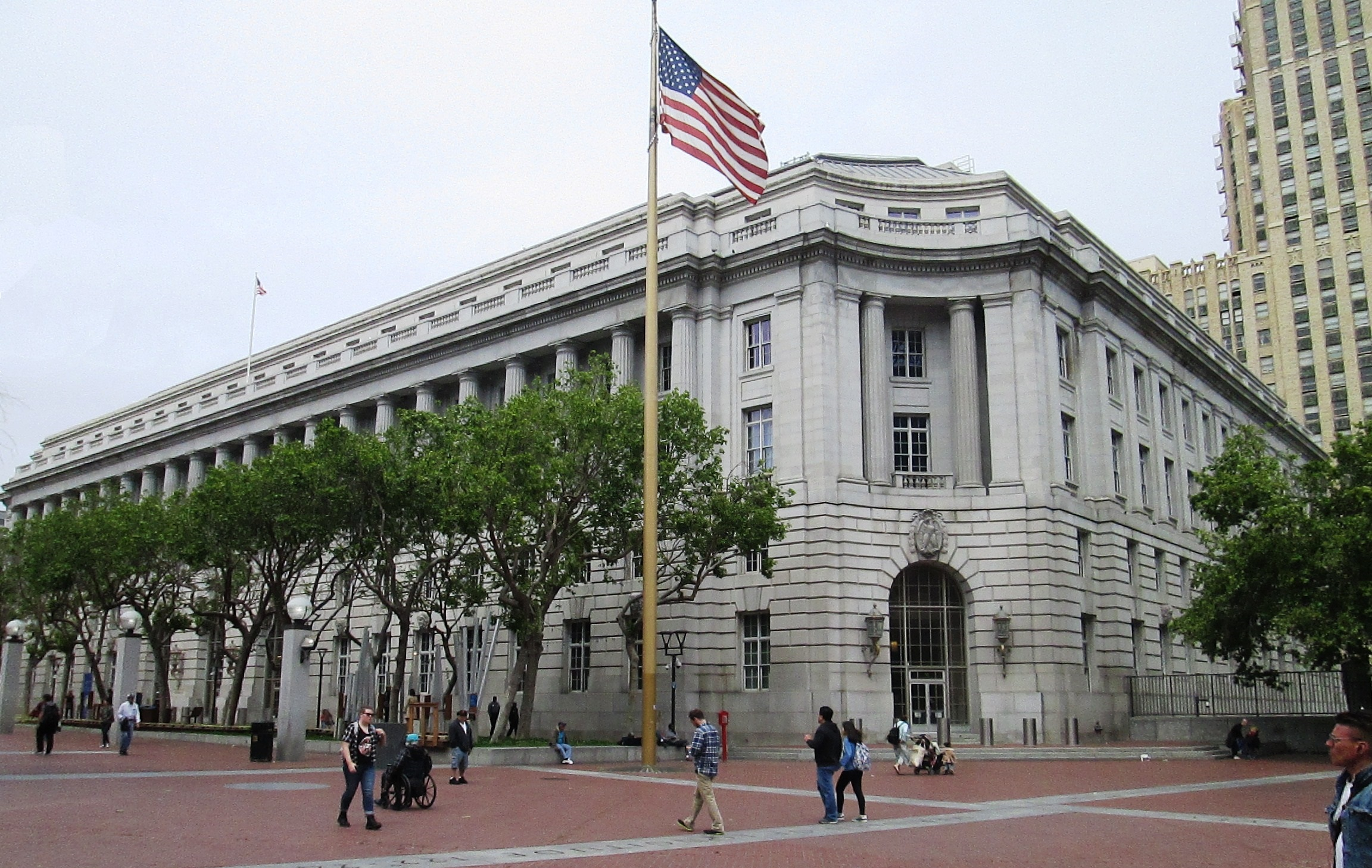
- (2017)

- Location within San Francisco County
- Location: 50 United Nations Plaza; San Francisco, California
- Coordinates: 37°46′50″N 122°24′52″W
- Built: 1934–1936
- Architect: Arthur Brown, Jr.
- Architectural style: Second Renaissance Revival
- Part of: San Francisco Civic Center Historic District (ID78000757)
- NRHP reference No.: 100001018
- Added to NRHP: June 5, 2017

The 50 United Nations Plaza Federal Office Building is a United States federal building located on United Nations Plaza between Hyde and McAllister Streets in San Francisco, California. The 1936 Neoclassical style building, designed by Arthur Brown, Jr., is listed on the National Register of Historic Places, and is a contributing property to the San Francisco Civic Center Historic District, which is a National Historic Landmark.

== Building ==
In 1906, a major earthquake devastated San Francisco and destroyed more than 28,000 buildings, many as a result of subsequent fires. As the city rebuilt, it adopted a plan for a civic center, first developed in 1899 by English architect B.J.S. Cahill, to consolidate government buildings in a central location. The last building completed for the San Francisco Civic Center, the Federal Building was a critical component of the seven-building complex that included government buildings, a library, and an opera house. The Civic Center design incorporates City Beautiful planning, a concept that relies on Beaux Arts design principles and classically inspired, monumental architecture. San Francisco's Civic Center is one of the nation's most successful examples of the City Beautiful movement.

In 1927, the government allocated $2.5 million for the Federal Building's design and construction, although final costs reached a total of $3 million. San Francisco city officials donated a site in 1930. Architect Arthur Brown, Jr. designed the building, which was constructed between 1934 and 1936, under the auspices of Supervising Architect of the Treasury Louis A. Simon. Brown studied at the Ecole des Beaux-Arts in Paris, the world's preeminent architectural school, graduating in 1901. He was the sole architect of the Federal Building, as well as the Opera House and Veterans Building, both significant components of the Civic Center. Brown and his partner John Bakewell, Jr. designed City Hall, a 1915 Beaux Arts architectural masterpiece. Also located within the Civic Center, the City Hall commission established the partners' careers.

In 1975, construction commenced on United Nations Plaza, designed by noted landscape architect Lawrence Halprin and located next to the Federal Building. The one-acre pedestrian area was named to honor the establishment of the U.N., which occurred in the Veterans Building on June 26, 1945. The Federal Building is a contributing element to the San Francisco Civic Center, which the Secretary of the Interior designated a National Historic Landmark in 1987. The building was vacated in 2007 after the new federal building was constructed in San Francisco. The U.S. General Services Administration (GSA) took over the building in 2013 after its renovation.

=== Architecture ===
The Federal Building is an excellent example of Second Renaissance Revival architecture, displaying style-defining features such as distinct horizontal divisions, a rusticated base, and classical ornamentation including columns on the exterior elevations. The building occupies the block bounded by United Nations Plaza, and Hyde, McAllister, and Leavenworth streets. It has a rectangular footprint with an interior courtyard that allows natural light into the interior. The six-story steel frame is encased in fireproof concrete with concrete flooring and roof slabs, features that officials and architects agreed were important precautions after the fires resulting from the 1906 earthquake. The street elevation walls are constructed of brick but faced with granite, with the exception of a section of the McAllister Street elevation, which is faced in terracotta.

At the first two stories, the granite is rusticated to articulate the base of the building. The upper stories of the south facade, which faces United Nations Plaza, are covered with smooth-faced granite and dominated by a colonnade of detached two-story Doric columns that are aligned with Doric pilasters on the building. A classical balustrade supports the railing between the columns. Fenestration consists primarily of regularly spaced rectangular windows with multi-pane configurations. The attic story is set back from the wall plane of the building and is surrounded by a classical balustrade and topped by a molded cornice.

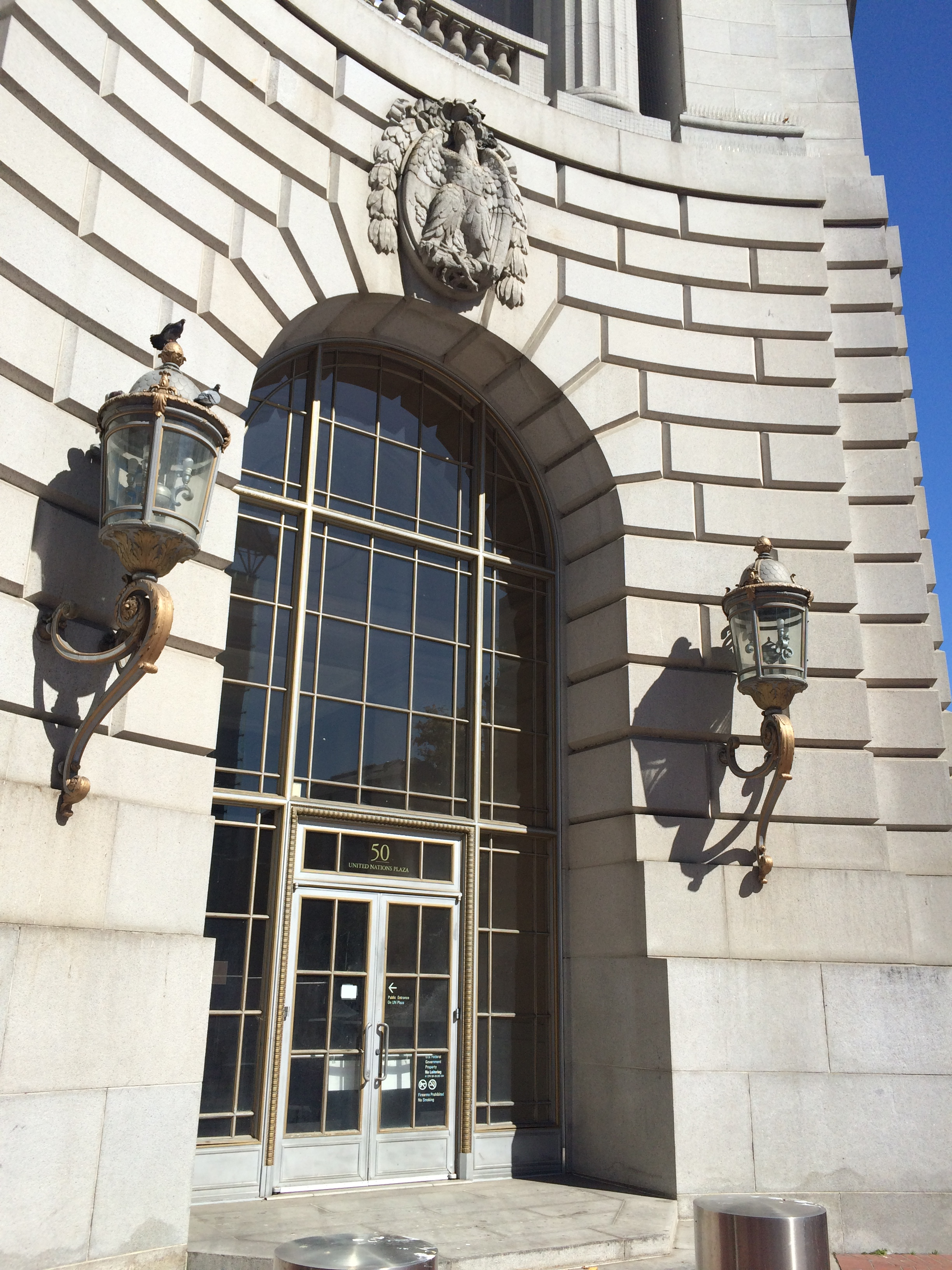
A corner door

The main entrance, consisting of three arched openings, is located at the center of the south elevation. The central arch is topped by a keystone that contains a medallion with a carved shield motif, while the flanking arches each are topped by a medallion featuring an eagle holding olive branches. Secondary entrances are located on the southeast and southwest corners of the building, where the meeting points of the exterior walls have been designed as concave arc configurations. Round arches with ornate medallions placed on the keystones also mark these entrances, and Doric porticos are located above the second story of the corners. Male and female mascarons (carved faces) adorn the exterior. The carvings sport different horticulturally themed headpieces, including corn, wheat, cat tails, and oak leaves. The hipped roof is covered with light grey lead-coated copper.

The main entrance vestibule and first-floor lobby are the most grand and richly detailed interior spaces in the building. The terrazzo flooring features a marble border. Grey marble wainscot, rising to a height of more than twenty-seven feet, covers the walls. Above the wainscot, the cast-stone walls spring into the barrel vaulted ceiling, which features molded hexagonal, rectangular, and diamond-shaped decorative coffers and shell motifs. A detailed cornice and doorway surmounted with a triangular pediment add to the classically inspired design of the entry spaces.

Cast-stone arches separate the first-floor elevator lobby from the corridors. The original bronze elevator doors remain and bronze is also used on other historic elements of the elevator lobby, including a mailbox, clocks, telephone booths, and building directory and bulletin board frames. The lobby leads to an internal courtyard that is open to the sky. Walkways are interspersed with trees, shrubbery, and groundcover plantings.

Several significant interior spaces remain intact. The former Board Room for the U.S. Navy is located on the second floor. Paneled wainscot covers the lower portions of walls, while the upper areas are plaster. The former office of the General Inspector, Supply Corps is a rectangular room with rounded corners. Double-leaf French doors admit natural light and lead to an exterior balcony. A wood and plaster cornice tops the walls. The former Collector of Internal Revenue office contains a similar cornice and paneled wood wainscot covers the walls.

Another important interior space is the former naval Commandant's Suite, a circular ceremonial room, twenty feet in diameter, with adjacent offices, restroom, dressing room, and waiting room. The parquet oak floor contains a centrally placed U.S. Navy seal. An original fireplace with an ornate verde antique marble Rococo-style mantel remains in the room.

== History ==
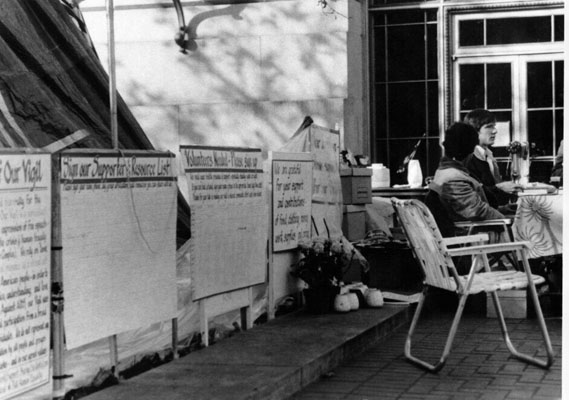
AIDS/ARC Vigil in 1985

In 1977, after frustration that the secretary of the United States Department of Health, Education, and Welfare had delayed signing regulations implementing Section 504 of the Rehabilitation Act of 1973 for four years, disability rights protestors marched to this federal building and began a sit-in that became a 26-day occupation. This 504 Sit-in was led by Judith Heumann and organized by Kitty Cone. More than 150 demonstrators refused to disband; this action was the longest sit-in at a federal building to date. Joseph Califano signed the regulations on April 28, 1977.

In 1985, when the renamed United States Department of Health and Human Services was in this building, protestors with AIDS and AIDS-related complex chained themselves to the door of the building on October 27, to demand that the U.S. government increase funding for AIDS-related research, care, and social services. They stayed for weeks and began the AIDS/ARC Vigil, which was an encampment that stayed for ten years (until 1995).

In November 1985, activist Cleve Jones organized a candlelight march in remembrance of the 1978 assassinations of San Francisco Supervisor Harvey Milk and Mayor George Moscone, and he asked people to write the names of loved ones lost to AIDS-related causes on signs. At the end of the march, they taped the signs to the walls of this federal building. The signs taped to the building looked like a patchwork quilt to Jones, and he was inspired to start the NAMES Project AIDS Memorial Quilt with several collaborators.

=== Significant events ===
- 1927: Congress approves $2.5 million for new San Francisco Federal Building
- 1930: City of San Francisco donates site for building
- 1934–1936: Building constructed
- 1975: United Nations Plaza construction commences
- 1987: San Francisco Civic Center designated a National Historic Landmark
- 2007: Building vacated
- 2017: Building added to National Register of Historic Places
