= Brad Lomax =

American human rights and disability activist

- Born: Bradford Clyde Lomax; September 13, 1950; Philadelphia, Pennsylvania, U.S.
- Died: August 28, 1984 (aged 33); Sacramento, California, U.S.
- Cause of death: Complications of multiple sclerosis

Bradford Clyde Lomax (September 13, 1950 – August 28, 1984) was an American civil rights and disability rights activist. Born in Philadelphia, he attended Howard University. During his time at the university, he was diagnosed with multiple sclerosis, and later began using a wheelchair.

Lomax was a member of the Black Panther Party. He contributed to the establishment of the Washington, D.C., chapter of the Black Panthers and played a role in organizing the 504 Sit-in.

== Early life and education ==
Brad Lomax was born on September 13, 1950, in Philadelphia to Katie Lee (née Bell) Lomax and Joseph Randolph Lomax. He had two siblings.

In 1963, Lomax visited his mother's family in Alabama, a center of civil rights activism at the time. His brother later recalled that the trip left a lasting impression on him. The visit coincided with the Birmingham Campaign. Experiencing racial segregation firsthand influenced Lomax’s later activism.

Lomax attended Benjamin Franklin High School, where he was involved in football and the school’s drama program. He graduated in 1967. In 1968, he considered joining the military and ultimately chose to attend Howard University, citing opposition to the racist treatment of Black soldiers during the Vietnam War. Around this time, he began experiencing symptoms of multiple sclerosis, which eventually required him to use a wheelchair. The inaccessibility of public spaces due to a lack of ramps and other accommodations became a significant issue for Lomax.

Howard University was a hub for anti-Vietnam War activism and the Black Power movement during the late 1960s. Lomax became involved in these movements and joined the Black Panther Party. As part of his work with the organization, he taught a political education class through the Black Panthers’ education program.

== Activism ==
In 1969, Lomax helped establish the Washington, D.C., chapter of the Black Panthers. He soon moved to Oakland, California, where the Black Panthers were headquartered. After moving to Oakland, he encountered significant accessibility barriers, as the city lacked sufficient infrastructure to accommodate wheelchair users. His advocacy combined his commitment to both Black empowerment and disability rights. As part of these efforts, he worked to establish a chapter of the Center for Independent Living, an organization run by and for disabled individuals, in collaboration with the Black Panther Party.

Lomax became involved in the disability rights movement at a time when existing laws provided limited protections. While some legislation was enacted in the 1970s, such as the Rehabilitation Act of 1973, its impact was restricted due to vague definitions of terms like "disabled" and "discrimination". As a result, activists organized sit-ins and other demonstrations to demand stronger legal protections. In 1977, disability rights activists in San Francisco staged a 504 Sit-in. The Black Panther Party supported the protest by providing food and other resources to participants. Lomax advocated for the passage of the Rehabilitation Act of 1973 and helped organize the 504 Sit-ins. Lomax connected the Black Panther Party to the East Oakland Center for Independent living thus solidifying a coalition of civil rights and disability activism.

Lomax dedicated much of his life to disability rights advocacy. His efforts contributed to significant legislative and societal changes regarding accessibility and inclusion.

== Achievements ==
Lomax collaborated with Ed Roberts to establish the East Oakland Center for Independent Living, which provided resources to help disabled people live independently rather than relying on family or institutional care. He advocated for equitable housing for disabled people in Washington, D.C. and California.

Lomax's chapter of the Black Panthers had nearly 2,000 members at its peak. He contributed to the establishment of the Black Panther Health Clinic in Washington, D.C., His connections within the Black Panther Party facilitated collaboration between the party and the disability rights movement, most notably during the 504 Sit-in, where the Black Panthers provided food and other resources to protesters

== Death and legacy ==
Lomax died on August 28, 1984, in Sacramento, California, due to complications related to multiple sclerosis. He was 33 years old.

Toward the end of his life, Lomax focused on advocating for changes in the education system to improve access for disabled students.

Lomax's advocacy contributed to the eventual passage of the Americans with Disabilities Act of 1990.

In the 2026 Judith Heumann biopic, Being Heumann, which covers the Section 504 sit-ins, he is portrayed by Antwan Tolliver. Brad is a major character through which the film's emphasis on intersectionality in activism is portrayed.
