= Mary Jane Owen =

American activist (1929–2019)

Mary Jane McKeown Owen (June 8, 1929 – July 14, 2019) was an American disability rights activist, philosopher, policy expert and writer who lived and worked in Washington, D.C. from 1979 – 2019.

== Biography ==
Owen was born in northern Illinois to Methodist ministers and came from a long line of traditional feminists. She became involved with social justice at a young age, demonstrating against segregation with the Congress of Racial Equality (CORE) in Los Angeles, California, in 1949.

After graduating from the University of New Mexico she studied at the New School for Social Research in New York City and received a master's degree in social work from the University of California, Berkeley, where she was involved in the Free Speech Movement, the People's Park confrontations and demonstrations against the Vietnam War.

She became a professor in the Department of Social Work Education at San Francisco State University and chaired the United Professors of California's grievance committee in addressing the faculty strike of 1968–1969.

Upon losing her sight in 1972 she spent several months at the Orientation Center for the Blind before joining Berkeley's Center for Independent Living where she served on the board. In 1977 she joined disability rights activists Judy Heumann, Dick Santos, and Kitty Cone in planning the HEW sit-in in San Francisco in support of Section 504 of the Rehabilitation Act. She spoke at the initial rally and gained the support of Mayor Moscone as well as the Burton brothers then serving in the United States Congress. She organized a hunger strike, wrote press releases and led protesters to remain in the HEW building.

In 1978 she was named director of a volunteer service organization at Berkeley and testified before Congress about its success. She was appointed state director of ACTION/Peace Corps in Nevada, and then to a job in the national office in Washington, D.C., as director of their efforts in celebration of the International Year of the Disabled, Peace Corps Partners program and Women in Development. She was also associated with Justin Dart, Jr.

Later she was Congressional liaison/editor for the President's Committee on Employment of the Disabled. In 1986 she began to use a wheelchair after a series of accidents and surgery. In the late 1980s she started Disability Focus, Inc., and was involved in the passage of the Americans with Disabilities Act of 1990 (ADA). A 1991 research grant on the impact of the 504 sit-in led to a television program.

As the executive director of the National Catholic Office for People with Disabilities from 1992 to 2004, she brought advocacy and scholarship emerging from the disabilities community into the theology of the Catholic Church and spoke twice in Vatican City. In 2005 she founded and became the national director of Disabled Catholics in Action.

Mary Jane Owen was named Catholic Woman of the Year in 2002 by the Catholic Daughters of the Americas and has received numerous other awards. She appeared on radio talk shows and local television and has written thousands of published articles. She was a leader in the national disability community and drew from a background as a professor, federal administrator, consultant, writer, businesswoman, and social worker. She was partially hearing, used a wheelchair and regained her sight after 30 years of blindness.

== Quotes ==
- "Disabilities are the normal and expected outcome of the risks and stresses of the living process itself and therefore it is necessary for every community to anticipate their development."
- "The gift of life comes in extremely fragile packaging."
- "Some of us here can go on a hunger strike. That will prove that our civil rights are more important to us than food. They cannot starve us out!"
- "This has been our fort. We must not abandon this stronghold until we know we have won."

== Affiliations ==
- Boardmember: National Organization on Disability (NOD)
- Founder/CEO: Disability Focus, Inc.
- Founder/CEO: Disabled Catholics in Action
- Former director: National Catholic Office for People with Disabilities
