= Section 504 sit-ins =

1977 American disability rights protest

The Section 504 Sit-ins were a nationwide disability rights protest that began on April 5, 1977. People with disabilities and the disability community occupied federal buildings in the United States in order to push the issuance of long-delayed regulations regarding Section 504 of the Rehabilitation Act of 1973. Prior to the enactment of the Americans with Disabilities Act in 1990, the Rehabilitation Act was the most important disability rights legislation in the United States.

== Background ==
The events leading up to the 504 sit-in stemmed from the failure to enforce the legislation of Section 504 of the Rehabilitation Act. Early versions of the Act were vetoed by President Richard Nixon in October 1972 and March 1973. In 1972, Disabled in Action demonstrated in New York City with a sit-in protesting one of the vetoes. Led by Judith E. Heumann, eighty activists staged this sit-in on Madison Avenue, stopping traffic. In 1972 demonstrations were also held by disabled activists in Washington, D.C. to protest this veto; among the demonstrators were Disabled in Action, Paralyzed Veterans of America, the National Paraplegia Foundation, and others.

The Act was eventually signed into law in 1973. The text of Section 504 states: "No otherwise qualified handicapped individual in the United States shall solely on the basis of his handicap, be excluded from the participation, be denied the benefits of, or be subjected to discrimination under any program or activity receiving federal financial assistance." This means no disabled person should be excluded from any program, service, or similar which receives federal funds.

Before the passage of Section 504, disability was viewed as a personal deficit and responsibility, which conforms to the medical model of disability. After the passage of Section 504, people began to understand disability as a societal problem, i.e. that being disabled was not caused by the person, but rather by the construction of society, as illustrated by the social model of disability.

With the passage of Section 504, discrimination against people with disabilities was legally documented. Hubert Humphrey, who worked before Section 504 to pass civil rights legislation regarding the rights of people with disabilities, said of Section 504: "The time has come to firmly establish the right of disabled Americans to dignity and self-respect as equal and contributing members of society and to end the virtual isolation of millions of children and adults."

Policies surrounding the treatment of people with disabilities followed the mindset which started in the Colonial Era with laws regarding people with cognitive and psychological disabilities. The laws of that time were to protect the community from the financial burden of caring for people with such disabilities. The laws largely were in place until the American Revolution. These sorts of laws set the paternalistic mentality and stereotypes regarding people with disabilities in motion. These stereotypes of people with disabilities as being second-class citizens remained through the Civil Rights Movement and scholars argue still exist as demonstrated by the persistence of the medical model of disability.

The passage of Section 504 was only the beginning of the progress needed for the civil rights of people with disabilities to be acknowledged; regulations were needed. First, the definition of disability had to be clarified, then a clear definition about what constituted discrimination regarding disability was needed, and, finally, the enforcement procedures and timelines had to be developed. Without these regulations, the courts were able to interpret the legislation of Section 504 however they preferred. The United States Department of Health, Education, and Welfare (HEW) was to provide the regulations addressing Section 504.

== Drafting regulations ==
From the passage of Section 504 in 1973 to 1977 there were no published regulations. During these years, people with disabilities and interested parties filed a lawsuit in federal court regarding the regulations. The judge ruled that the regulations must be issued, but did not provide a deadline. Institutions that must comply with Section 504 opposed the publication of regulations. Some Office for Civil Rights attorneys drafted regulations and sent the drafts to the Secretary of HEW. The HEW then sent the drafted regulations to Congress and Congress sent the draft back to HEW. The disability community further pushed for the regulations. The American Coalition of Citizens with Disabilities (ACCD) was formed and organized to push for the issuance of the regulations.

After a period of public comment, the final regulations were waiting for Secretary Joseph Califano's signature. The Carter administration took office around this time. HEW set up a task force to discuss the regulations. No disabled people were represented on the task force. The task force weakened the regulations, which meant changes in coverage and enforcement. The ACCD demanded the regulations be issued by April 4, 1977, without changes, and warned if they did not, action would be taken. A sit-in at eight HEW regional headquarters was planned for the following day if Secretary Califano did not comply.

== Events ==
On April 5, 1977, activists began to demonstrate and sit-in at the HEW offices found in regions including Atlanta, Boston, Chicago, Denver, Los Angeles, New York City, Philadelphia, and Seattle. The two most noteworthy protests occurred in San Francisco and Washington, D.C. The Sit-in was conceived by Frank Bowe and organized by the ACCD. The protesters demanded the signing of regulations for Section 504.

There were about 300 people in Washington, D.C. who marched to and then demonstrated inside the HEW building where Secretary Califano's office was. Although he met with a few protest representatives, including Frank Bowe, he still did not sign the regulations. This action led many protesters to continue their sit-in overnight, but they then left after 28 hours due to the government taking action; the government made it so people were unable to enter the building, cutting off the protestors' access to food, water, and medicine.

The more successful sit-in occurred in San Francisco, planned by Judith Heumann, Kitty Cone, and Mary Jane Owen, lasted until May 4, 1977, a total of 25 days, with more than 150 people refusing to leave. It is the longest sit-in at a federal building to date. Close to 120 disability activists and protesters occupied the HEW building.

=== Protests across the United States ===
By April 1977 disability activists had grown tired of waiting. Having tried multiple options, including letter-writing, lobbying, and personal pleas, they decided to call for a national protest if Califano did not sign the regulations by April 4, 1977. After Frank Bowe, head of the ACCD, failed to convince the new administration, approximately 300 protesters in Washington, DC marched outside Califano's house and then into his office demanding that he sign the regulations.

Across the country, other people with disabilities joined in the 504 Sit-in, either picketing or occupying HEW regional offices. In addition to Washington D.C., protests took place in Boston, Seattle, New York, Atlanta, Philadelphia, Chicago, Dallas, and Denver. All dissipated out after officials made them disperse or waited them out. In Washington DC, protesters held out for 26 hours that included a standoff between them at Califano who climbed on top of a table to say that the regulations needed further study. In New York another six protesters had to leave due to lack of food and medications.

=== San Francisco 504 occupation ===
In San Francisco over the previous years, organizers Judy Heumann and Kitty Cone had been laying the groundwork among local organizations, community members, and people with disabilities themselves to educate them about the law and its significance. Heumann and Cone realized they needed to plan for something bigger than protesting outside in order to put pressure on regional HEW Director Joseph Maldonado who reported to his boss in Washington, Joseph Califano. They followed the lead of student activists at the time that called for occupying administration buildings on campuses across the country.

Organizing an occupation that involved people with disabilities presented certain challenges that helped spur the decision to occupy. Due to the physical nature of their disabilities, and given the Federal Building's inaccessibility (one of the things that Section 504 was supposed to address), it was difficult to move large numbers of people with disabilities in and out of the building. This meant having to plan for a longer occupation in advance but without alerting too many participants so as to prevent law enforcement from barring entrance to the building. It worked in the occupiers' favor that there had never been such a large protest involving so many disabled people before. A prevailing view held that people with disabilities were pathetic and deserving of pity, and therefore incapable of such political actions. This same perspective made officials reluctant to risk a public relations embarrassment that would result from arresting participants.

The day after ACCD's April 4 deadline for signing the 504 regulations had passed, over 500 disabled people and their allies attended a rally on Civic Center Plaza where various speakers addressed why Califano needed to sign them. Heumann urged the crowd to "go and tell Mr. Maldonado that the government cannot steal our civil rights!" Television stations and newspapers covered the initial confrontation between the protesters and Maldonado, who appeared to have no idea about the regulations or his boss's stand in Washington.

Then approximately 150 people with disabilities and their allies streamed into the Federal Building at 50 United Nations Plaza. Occupiers included people with many different disabilities. They also included many nondisabled allies such as American Sign Language (ASL) interpreters, personal care attendants, and parents of children with disabilities. The group was primarily young and racially diverse. Unlike most other major protest movements at the time (with the exception of Women's Rights), the 504 Occupation was led by women, with queer women playing an especially prominent role.

They climbed to HEW regional director Maldonado's office on the 4th floor and refused to leave. Initially, HEW officials in San Francisco tried to remove them using similar tactics to those in other cities. But the large number of people, combined with the Bay Area's atmosphere of activism and social justice, meant that the protesters had many outside allies. A number of people with disabilities had participated in the Civil Rights Movement and anti-Vietnam war protests which allowed them to understand calls for disability rights as part of the general foment of Bay Area social movements.

==== Support ====
Organizers Kitty Cone and Judy Heumann had built networks among activists for other causes and organizations, which was new for disability rights activism. Over months and years, they had cultivated relationships with groups such as the Black Panther Party, Glide Memorial Church, the Gay Men's Butterfly Brigade, Delancey Street, the United Farm Workers, the Gray Panthers, and others. The protesters were also supported by Congressman Phillip Burton, who ensured that protesters would have access to phone lines,and later held hearings in the building with Congressman George Miller. The occupiers also had the support of local politicians including San Francisco Mayor George Moscone and Senator Alan Cranston. Georgia senator Julian Bond visited the occupation. Letters of support came from Cesar Chavez and labor unions, including the International Association of Machinists (IAM). The Salvation Army provided mattresses and blankets.

This outside support enabled the occupation to continue until the regulations were signed on April 28, 1977. Especially important was the help from the Black Panther Party which, in the spirit of its food programs, provided hot meals daily in support of fellow Panther Bradley Lomax and his assistant Chuck Jackson.

Meanwhile, support from the Mayor's office and from some HEW staff working in the building made life easier inside. The City brought in inflatable air mattresses and portable showers and had new pay phones installed after HEW officials in DC had ordered the lines to be cut.

Outside the building, hundreds of supporters held daily vigils. This kept the occupation in public view and encouraged the protesters to hold on. A few outside supporters even decided to join those inside.

==== Life inside ====
Protesters found life inside the building for 26 days both difficult and life-changing. Because of the need to keep the occupation secret at the beginning, most arrived with only a toothbrush and necessary medications. Some people with disabilities had medical needs that required special attention such as eating and taking medications at set hours and being turned at regular intervals during the night to avoid getting bedsores. Because many had entered the building without their usual care-takers, they turned to their fellow occupiers to assist them in the tasks of daily living. Blind people became attendants to quadriplegics who in turn read printed information to the blind people. This created strong bonds among the protesters and educated them about disabilities other than their own.

Occupiers found innovative ways to transform an office building into a temporary place for over one hundred people to live. For example, they used duct-tape and other materials to seal off an air conditioner in Moldonado's office to create a refrigerator for storing medications.

Committees formed that gave everyone a job related to the occupation: food, safety, clean-up, entertainment, communications/media, fundraising.

Feeding such a large group was essential to keeping the protest going. Initially some people could enter and leave the building. This made it possible for them to collect donations of money and food. Major outlets such as McDonald's and Safeway contributed in the spirit of "helping the handicapped" until it became clear that protesters were engaging in civil disobedience. Within the first few days members of the Black Panther Party arrived to volunteer to feed all of the occupiers, including Brad Lomax and Chuck Jackson. "We support you because you're asking America to change, to treat you like human beings, like you belong," one explained, "We always support people fighting for their rights." When FBI agents tried to prevent them from delivering food, the Panthers held their ground. After that, the Panthers provided hot meals each day until the end of the occupation and never asked for money.

Eight of the approximately 120 occupiers who remained in the building went on a hunger strike to underline the urgency of the cause.

Protesters celebrated Easter and Passover with a mass, a seder, and a hunt for eggs.

When the FBI began restricting entry, occupiers convinced building guards that ASL interpreters and anyone provided healthcare needed to be free to come and go. During the many hours of boredom, protesters learned enough ASL that guards allowed some to move more freely. Thus the occupation was rather fluid. Some protesters even described sneaking off to the beach.

People slept on the floor in sleeping bags and blankets that were smuggled in. Some found places under desks or at the foot of a stairway. There was an unused elevator that became a favorite place for intimate encounters. There were some issues with cleanliness, including reports of lice and crabs.

Occupiers held daily meetings in one of the larger meeting rooms to keep people informed, to run the occupation, and to make plans. Because not everyone could fit, smaller networks united by disability, being from the same city, or linked by identities such as being queer sent representatives who would report back. Each committee also reported daily on what was important. Decisions were always discussed and arrived at collectively. Care was taken to make sure that each person felt their voices had been heard.

Communicating with the outside world was challenging in an era before computers, cell phones, and fax machines, especially when HEW officials ordered the office phone lines to be turned off. The building's few pay phones quickly filled with coins as the phone company stopped coming to collect them. The occupiers became resourceful. In addition to unfurling banners out the windows, they used Deaf people inside the building to transmit messages in sign language through windows on the fourth floor to other interpreters outside on the street below. They used this way so that press releases got out into the public and occupiers got news of the outside world. Later, phone lines had been cut to just one which allowed outgoing calls only, Congressman Phillip Burton Pressured officials to provide three additional phone lines so that protesters could have access to food and medicine from outside the building.

To pass the many hours of boredom waiting inside an office building, occupiers played cards, sang, held wheelchair races, and talked late into the night. Friendships and intimate relationships formed. Occupiers, some who had never spent time away from home before, were meeting other people with the same and different disabilities to their own. They argued and bonded and discovered people with a common sense of purpose. They also gained confidence. One young woman filmed during the occupation said, "I used to know what I would wish for. I wanted to be beautiful. I wanted to stop being a cripple. But now I know I am beautiful." Summing it up later, another participant explained: "It didn't matter if you were mentally retarded, blind or deaf. Everybody...felt, We are beautiful, we are powerful, we are strong, we are important."

Participant HolLynn D'Lil took over 300 pictures documenting the event.

==== "The Hearing" ====
As the occupation dragged on, organizers sought ways to keep morale up and media attention focused on the protest. Ten days in, they came up with the idea of working with representatives Philip Burton and George Miller to host a day-long hearing in the building so that protesters could educate America about the plight of people with disabilities. The sympathetic politicians declared the 4th floor of 50 UN Plaza "a satellite office of Congress," which brought television and newspaper reporters. As cameras rolled, dozens of protesters testified on one of several panels related to specific disabling conditions: blindness, deafness, addiction, and others. In a highly public way, people with disabilities were educating Americans about low employment rates, housing discrimination, lack of educational opportunities.

During the hearing a low-ranking HEW official sent from Washington let slip that Califano was considering making twenty-two changes to the 504 regulations. These included eliminating rules that would require hospitals and schools to provide ramps and other features for access as well as setting up special schools for disabled children rather than keeping them in mainstream schools. The official used the term "separate but equal," a fact that made them even angrier and strengthened their resolve. Disability rights leader Ed Roberts - then head of the California State Department of Rehabilitation and who visited the occupation regularly - condemned this solution, stating: "Integration is the key word: people with disabilities have to come back into our society."

==== Some San Francisco protesters go to Washington, DC ====
Two weeks into the occupation, protest leaders realized that in order to succeed, they would need more national attention. Twenty-five people reflecting racial and disability diversity were elected to travel to the nation's capitol where they planned to meet with groups on the east coast and put more pressure on politicians. The IAM helped raise money for airline tickets and for travel once the protesters were in Washington. In these early days of the disability rights movement, it was hard to find accessible transportation, public or private, for people who used wheelchairs. This meant they had to travel in the back of a dark U-Haul truck that had a cargo lift. They slept on the floor of a church.

In Washington, protesters had meetings with congressional representatives, a challenge at a time when many federal buildings - including the Capitol - were not accessible for people in wheelchairs. They also held candle-light vigils outside the wealthy suburban home of HEW Secretary Califano where they sang "Sign 504" to the tune of the Civil Rights Anthem "We Shall Overcome". They even protested outside of President Jimmy Carter's church, but Carter slipped out the side door. Another day, they held a large rally in Lafayette Park across the street from the White House that attracted hundreds of supporters.

===== Continued activism led by Section 504 protesters =====
Following the Section 504 sit-ins in 1977, disability rights activism continued throughout the United States. Many leaders of the protest, including Judith Heumann, continued advocating for disability rights while holding power in state and federal positions. The "Father of Section 504," Frank Bowe, became responsible for further disability rights advancements like widespread availability for TV captioning. Many discriminatory practices were changed, as architectural barriers came down and it became easier for people to obtain interpreter services or readers. Heumann, Bowe, and many other protesters at the 1977 sit-ins worked with organizations and fought for access until July 1990, when President Bush signed the Americans with Disabilities Act. The decades following the sit-ins have become critical years for the advancements of disability rights in the United States.

== Conclusion ==
Califano signed the regulations on April 28, 1977. This protest was significant not only because its goal was achieved, but also because it was the foremost concerted effort between people of different disabilities coming together in support of legislation that affected the overall disability population, rather than only specific groups.

== In media ==
- The 2008 documentary The Power of 504 on YouTube is about the sit-in.
- Comedy Central made a 2018 episode of Drunk History on the sit-in.
- Several activists wrote memoirs of their experiences, such as Judy Heumann's book Being Heumann: An Unrepentant Memoir of a Disability Rights Activist and Joan Corbett's book Faded Scars: My Queer Disability History. These texts offer insights into the personal experiences and feelings of the participants of the 504 Sit-In.
- The San Francisco sit-in is featured in the 2020 documentary Crip Camp.
- The San Francisco sit-in is the main subject of the film Being Heumann directed by Sian Heder.

== See also ==
- Capitol Crawl
