= Patricia Wright =

Patricia Wright may refer to:

- Patricia Wright (primatologist) (born 1944)
- Patricia Wright (actress) (born 1921)
- Patricia Wright, murdered by Dana Rivers in 2016

== See also ==
- Patrisha Wright, American disabilities activist
- Pat Wright (disambiguation)
