= Sitting Pretty =

Sitting Pretty or Sittin' Pretty may refer to:

== Films, stage, and TV ==
- Sitting Pretty (1924 musical), a Broadway musical produced by Guy Bolton and P.G Wodehouse, with music by Jerome Kern
- Sitting Pretty (1933 film), featuring Jack Oakie, Jack Haley and Ginger Rogers
- Sitting Pretty (1948 film), starring Robert Young, Maureen O'Hara and Clifton Webb
- Sitting Pretty (TV series), a British show that ran for two seasons, starting in 1992
- "Sitting Pretty", an episode of Family Matters

== Books ==
- Sitting Pretty, a 1976 novel by Al Young
- Sitting Pretty: The View from My Ordinary Resilient Disabled Body, a 2020 non-fiction book by Rebekah Taussig

== Music ==
- Sittin' Pretty (Bobbie Gentry album), a reissue of the 1968 album Local Gentry, or the title song, 1971
- Sittin' Pretty (The Pastels album) or the title song, 1989
- Sitting Pretty, an album by the Academic, 2023
- Sitting Pretty, an album by Elaine Paige, 1978
- "Sitting Pretty", a song from the musical Cabaret, 1966
- "Sittin' Pretty", a song by Florida Georgia Line from Can't Say I Ain't Country, 2019
- "Sittin' Pretty", a song by Shannon Noll from That's What I'm Talking About, 2004
