= Patrick Wright =

Patrick or Pat Wright may refer to:

- Patrick Wright, Baron Wright of Richmond (1931–2020), British diplomat
- Patrick Wright (historian), British academic, writer and broadcaster
- Pat Wright (baseball) (1868–1943), American baseball player
- Pat Wright (footballer) (1940–2023), English football coach and player
- Patrick Wright (rower) (born 1945), British rower
- Patrinell "Pat" Wright, founder of the gospel group Total Experience Gospel Choir

== See also ==
- Patricia Wright (disambiguation)
- Patrisha Wright, American disabilities activist
