= The Triumph and Tragedy of Lyndon Johnson: The White House Years =

1991 book by Joseph Califano

- Author: Joseph A. Califano Jr.
- Publisher: Simon & Schuster
- Publication date: 1991
- ISBN: 978-1-476-79879-0

The Triumph and Tragedy of Lyndon Johnson: The White House Years is a 1991 book by Joseph A. Califano Jr. regarding his personal experience being in the inner circle of the Lyndon B. Johnson administration.

As the chief domestic advisor, Califano attested to the volatility of Lyndon Johnson, explaining how his staff formulated the Great Society as well as the uncertainty Johnson had about escalating the United States' role in the Vietnam War.

== Reviews ==
In a review for The Wall Street Journal, Arthur Herman reflected on how the Democratic Party was heavily defined by Lyndon Johnson, and that Califano's pride in the Great Society masked some of its flaws, including welfare dependency.

Kirkus Reviews called it "One of the better White House "palace guard" memoirs of late".
