= Nairobi College =

American college in 1960s California

Nairobi College was a small junior college for ethnic minority students in East Palo Alto, California, founded by the Black Panther Party, active from 1969 until 1981. Nairobi College had satellite campuses throughout the San Francisco Bay Area. It was affiliated with the Nairobi Day School, a private preschool founded in 1966.

== Background ==
It is necessary for us to develop a new frame of reference which transcends the limits of white concepts. It is necessary for us to develop and maintain a total intellectual offensive against the false universality of white concepts.

— Lerone Bennett, Jr., qtd. in Ferguson 2015, p. 41

The College was part of a movement for ethnic minority groups in the United States to have dedicated academic programs to train themselves in the theory and practice of liberation, resistance, and revolution. These programs were referred to as "Third world colleges", which sought to practice the principles of self-determination and community empowerment while teaching black empowerment in rejection of the perceived bourgeois ideology and white control of mainstream academic institutions. Prominent advocates for this movement included graduate student Angela Davis and professors Herbert Marcuse of the University of California San Diego and Carlos Blanco of Thurgood Marshall College. Other colleges founded as part of this movement included Malcolm X Liberation University, Uhuru Sasa Shule, the Center for Black Education, and Thurgood Marshall College.

== Description ==
Nairobi College began classes in the fall of 1969 with initial funding of $100,000 donated by area residents and private foundations. 20,000 books were donated by schools, individuals, and publishers, which were kept in two residential garages. Anyone at least 16 years of age was welcome to enroll at no cost. The first class had 100 working-class students, some of whom had dropped out of high school. The all-volunteer faculty numbered about 40 and consisted of students and professors from nearby universities as well as community organizers. Based out of a small private home in East Palo Alto, Nairobi College operated out of stores, church buildings, and homes throughout black, Latino, and Asian neighborhoods in the San Francisco Peninsula. The college leadership hoped that spreading classes out in these existing structures would integrate it with the needs and reality of their surrounding community, calling it a "college without walls" in contrast to the perceived "ivory tower" of mainstream academia. It was a two-year college.

The students were primarily African American and Hispanic, although working-class white students were also included. Most of them worked full-time and took classes in the evenings. All students were required to utilize their training to provide skilled volunteer work three hours per week in support of area social organizations, such as schools, community health centers, and legal aid. (Note: Van Deburg (1992, p. 80) reports the requirement was four hours per day, which seems unlikely.)

Instructors included Ed Roberts, a disability rights activist, Tello Nkhereanye, a leftist from South Africa, Frank Omowale Satterwhite, a community organizer, Aaron Manganello, a Marxist minister of education for the Brown Berets, and Mary Hoover, a Stanford academic advocate for African-American English.

In 1966, Nairobi College launched an affiliated preschool through high school program called the Nairobi Day School. By 1971, a $500 tuition charge was instituted, but was usually paid by federal student financial aid and was often waived.

== See also ==
- Black Panther Party § Black Panther Party Liberation Schools
- Black separatism
- Experimental college movement
- Institute of the Black World
