= Sitting Pretty (memoir) =

2020 memoir by Rebekah Taussig

Sitting Pretty: The View from My Ordinary Resilient Disabled Body
- Author: Rebekah Taussig
- Genre: Memoir
- Publisher: HarperOne
- Publication date: August 25, 2020
- Pages: 256
- ISBN: 978-0-06-293679-0

Sitting Pretty: The View from My Ordinary Resilient Disabled Body is a 2020 memoir by Rebekah Taussig. Told as a series of essays, it details with Taussig's life as a disabled woman, having become paralyzed as a infant and being a wheelchair user.

== Background ==
Taussing is from Kansas City, Kansas and is a graduate of the University of Kansas, having a doctorate in Creative Nonfiction and Disability Studies. She runs a Instagram account titled @sitting_pretty. She became paralyzed at the age of 3 following treatment for cancer.

== Reception ==
Kirkus Reviews gave Sitting Pretty a starred review, saying "Taussig goes beyond empty inspirational jargon, forcing readers to consider the value of the real-world improvements that can emerge from centering underrepresented voices." In another starred review on Library Journal, Ahliah Bratzler wrote "Taussig's narrative style is highly conversational, making it feel like one is chatting with a lifelong friend."

Publishers Weekly praised the book's "refreshing, matter-of-fact tone," further stating Taussig's "smart and witty observations about living with disabilities will be enlightening and eye-opening for readers." The book was also reviewed in Booklist.

== Adaptions ==
In 2021, Sitting Pretty was optioned for a television adaption by ABC Signature. The adaption is planned to be developed by ABC Signature, Mandeville Films, and Randall Einhorn's Sad Unicorn production company, with Einhorn being a director-producer. Taussig was announced as a co-writer and executive producer for the project.

In 2026, a play adaptation was created.

== See also ==
- Being Heumann - biopic of Judith Heumann of which Taussig co-adapted from Heumann's memoir
