= HolLynn D'Lil =

American disability rights activist, writer, photographer, and teacher (1945–2022)

HolLynn D’Lil
- Born: HolLynn Bryson; June 15, 1945; Nuecestown, Texas, U.S.
- Died: June 24, 2022 (aged 77); Graton, California, U.S.
- Occupations: Disability Rights Activist, Writer, Photographer, Teacher
- Years active: 1970s–2022
- Known for: Role in the 1977 504 Sit-In, Disability Rights Advocacy
- Notable work: Photography, Disability Rights Writings
- Movement: Disability Rights Movement

HolLynn D'Lil (née Bryson) was a significant figure in the American disability rights movement, best known for her role photographing and participating in the historic 1977 “504 Sit-In” demanding the enforcement of Section 504 of the Rehabilitation Act of 1973, which prohibited discrimination against people with disabilities in federally funded programs in San Francisco. D’Lil was a passionate advocate, writer, and photographer whose work played a critical role in the disability rights movement in the United States. After a car accident left her paralyzed at the age of 22, D’Lil did not retreat from public life. Instead, she embraced activism and became a powerful voice for people with disabilities.

== Early life ==
HolLynn D’Lil (née Bryson) was born on June 15, 1945 in Nuecestown, Texas, to Charles Edward Bryson Jr. and Zula Lillian Holland. She was raised with an older brother named Charles in Corpus Christi, Texas. She attended Burgess High School and graduated in 1963. She enrolled at Texas A&M University. Following her studies, she began her career as a teacher at local private school in Alamo, Texas. At the age of 22, she was involved in a car accident that resulted in permanent paralysis.

== Career ==
This life altering event became a turning point, shaping both her personal journey and her future advocacy. Rather than retreating from public life, D’Lil channeled her experience into activism, eventually becoming a nationally recognized leader in the disability rights movement. Her work, which ranged public service, writing, photography, and consulting, would go on to make a lasting impact on accessibility, policy, and the lives of people with disabilities across the country.

She worked intermittently for the State of California as an accessibility consultant. During intervals between public service roles, she operated a clothing design business that specialized in garments for individuals who use wheelchairs.

In 2004, D’Lil moved to Graton, a small town located roughly 60 miles north of San Francisco. She officially retired in 2008, although she continued to be active in public life. She remained involved in several nonprofit organizations in leadership capacities and expressed her intent to seek election to the board of directors of the local sewer district. She co-starred in the Netflix academy-award nominated documentary Crip Camp. Several of the photographs featured in the documentary were taken by D’Lil.

== Personal life ==
D'Lil had two children and, after she divorced, relocated to Sacramento, California. Balancing life as a single mother with a disability, D’Lil worked intermittently for the State of California as an accessibility consultant. During gaps in public employment, she launched a clothing design business tailored for individuals who use wheelchairs. Despite facing significant personal and medical challenges including a second divorce and a cancer diagnosis, she returned to work and later transitioned into private consulting, allowing her greater flexibility in managing her health.

== Death ==
HolLynn D’Lil died on June 24, 2022 at the age of 77. The news of her death was shared in a tribute published by The Sonoma County Gazette, where she was fondly remembered for her extensive contributions to the Graton community as an advocate, nonprofit leader, and columnist.

== Bibliography ==
D’Lil, HolLynn. Becoming Real in 24 Days: One Participant's Story of the 1977 Section 504 Demonstration for Disability Rights. Large print ed., Hallavaland Productions
