= Kitty Cone =

American disability rights activist

- Born: April 7, 1944; Champaign, Illinois
- Died: March 21, 2015 (aged 70); Berkeley, California
- Occupation: Activist
- Known for: Activism for individuals with disabilities
- Relatives: Hutchinson I. Cone (grandfather); William Eleroy Curtis (great-grandfather)

Kitty Cone (April 7, 1944 – March 21, 2015) was an American disability rights activist. She had muscular dystrophy. She moved to the San Francisco Bay Area in 1972, and began working as a community organizer for the disability rights movement in 1974.

== Early life ==
Curtis Seldon Cone (Kitty) was born on April 7, 1944, in Champaign, Illinois. Their family moved to Florida once her father returned from World War II. Her father was a lawyer during their time in Florida, but left the firm, joined the army once again, and the family moved to Georgia.

Around age fifteen, she was diagnosed with muscular dystrophy. Once the family was in Georgia, Cone began receiving treatment for her disability, which at that time, was misdiagnosed as cerebral palsy. A few years later, she moved with her family to Maryland, where she began receiving surgeries at Walter Reed Army Medical Center. The surgeries and treatments had a worsening effect on Cone.

She moved with her mother back to Champaign during the time that her father was serving with the army in Japan. During her early teen years, Cone had walking casts to stretch out her tendons in her legs, but did not use crutches at the time. Her diagnosis changed around this time from cerebral palsy to polio. After another couple surgeries, she began using a cane to walk. Where Cone attended school, at Holton Arms school in Washington, D.C., the school buildings were several stories high. Her cousins, who attended there as well, began carrying her up the stairs to attend classes.

When Cone was in her mid-teens, her family moved to Kentucky. This was the first time she witnessed overt racism, attributing that to her school's segregation. It was in Kentucky that she got involved with civic activities.

Being unhappy in Kentucky, her parents applied to several boarding schools in Washington, D.C. She attended Mount Vernon Seminary. She was successful in academics and very popular, but was expelled after one semester. Cone had various rules imposed only on her, and her failure to follow some of them led to her expulsion. Due to her disability and her father being in the military, Cone attended a total of thirteen schools.

She attended the University of Illinois at Urbana–Champaign. She began using a wheelchair on campus and had to learn how to do daily activities while using a wheelchair. She was active in cheerleading and Student Senate. While running for Student Senate, she was interviewed by Roger Ebert, who at the time, was editor of The Daily Illini. At the end of her first year of college, her mother died suddenly. She had cancer, but Cone did not know about it. It is said her mother was misdiagnosed with what was referred to as nerves. She finished the semester, but returned home after the semester was over to help with her younger brother and stayed home through the fall semester of 1963. Her next year of school she got involved with the NAACP. It was at this time that she was heavily involved with the Civil Rights Movement.

She was becoming weaker about her second year of college and appealed to the Dean to move off campus into an apartment of her own, so she might experience living on her own before she was physically unable to do so. She also noted the dormitory curfew imposed on women at the time was hard to make when she was so active in the community. The Dean had her consult with the head of her academic program. The head of her program said something about her getting weaker because of all the protests she participated in and then hinted that she only wanted to live on her own so she could have sexual relationships.

During her time on campus, she and other students with disabilities were advised to not ask for or accept help from other students, so as to not appear weak or unfit for employment. Cone left college six hours from her degree.

== Activism ==
During her time at University of Illinois, Cone organized and participated in activism about the Vietnam war, civil rights, and poverty.

In the spring of 1967, Cone moved to New York and continued her Anti-War efforts she started while at the University of Illinois.

After short stints in Chicago and Atlanta, Cone moved to Oakland, California in 1974 and connected with the Center for Independent Living. She liked the work they were doing and approached Ed Roberts about working with the Center for Independent Living. Cone had experience in political organizing, so she was hired for the Community Affairs Department. For years, she worked in the Community Affairs Department doing health and welfare lobbying, organizing local, state, and national political efforts, and worked on architectural and transportation barriers to access. It was there that she organized a coalition and began getting ramps and curb cuts installed in Oakland.

Cone organized and participated in the 504 Sit-in. Initially Joseph Califano, U.S. Secretary of Health, Education and Welfare, refused to sign meaningful regulations for Section 504 of the Rehabilitation Act of 1973, which was the first U.S. federal civil rights protection for people with disabilities. After an ultimatum and deadline, demonstrations took place in ten U.S. cities on April 5, 1977, including the beginning of the 504 Sit-in at the San Francisco Office of the U.S. Department of Health, Education and Welfare. This sit-in, led by Judith Heumann and Cone, lasted until May 4, 1977, a total of 28 days, with more than 150 people refusing to leave. It is the longest sit-in at a federal building to date. Joseph Califano signed the unaltered regulations on April 28, 1977.

During the 504 Sit-in, Cone requested her FBI file and found she was on an FBI list. During her time at University of Illinois, she became Marxist.

After the Section 504 regulations were signed, Cone focused on transportation. She pursued implementation of Section 504 by protesting at the San Francisco Transbay Terminal in 1978, organizing Disabled People's Civil Rights Day in October 1979 in San Francisco, and lobbying in Washington against the Cleveland Amendment, which would have allowed local agencies to provide paratransit services instead of creating accessible public transportation systems. In 1984 she began working at the World Institute on Disability, where she researched international personal care assistance programs. She was among 500 attendees at a protest at the San Francisco City Hall September 27, 1987, while a public transit conference was being held at the Moscone Convention Center. In 1990 she began working for the Disability Rights Education and Defense Fund (DREDF)'s lawyer referral service, and in 1993 she became its development director. She retired in 1999, but remained active with DREDF.

== Personal life ==
Cone was unable to marry her partner, Kathy Martinez, due to legal restrictions on gay marriage. In 1981, she moved to Mexico with Martinez and adopted her son Jorge from Mexico. She struggled with alcohol use in her youth, although she stopped drinking in the 1970s.

== Death ==
Cone died on March 21, 2015, of pancreatic cancer in Berkeley, California, two weeks shy of her 71st birthday.

== Popular culture ==
In the 2026 Judith Heumann biopic, Being Heumann, which covers the Section 504 sit-ins, she is portrayed by Madeline Delp.
