= Johnnie Lacy =

American disability and civil rights activist (1937–2010)

Johnnie Ann Lacy
- Born: January 26, 1937; Huttig, Arkansas
- Died: November 15, 2010 (aged 73); Hayward, California
- Movement: Disability rights, civil rights, independent living
- Honours: Woman of the Year, California State Senate (1988)

Johnnie Ann Lacy (1937–2010) was a black disability rights and civil rights advocate, community leader, and activist. She was a leading advocate for the independent living movement, and helped found the country's first Center for Independent Living in Berkeley, California. She later served as the director of the Community Resources for Independent Living (CRIL), a nonprofit in Hayward, CA that provides advocacy, mentoring, and other services for people with disabilities. Lacy served on the California Attorney General's Commission on Disability, Hayward's Commission on Personnel and Affirmative Action, and the Mayor's Disability Council for the city and county of San Francisco.

== Personal life ==
Johnnie Ann Lacy was born on January 26, 1937, in Huttig, Arkansas, to Willie McHenry Lacy Sr. and Alice Lorraine Carrington Lacy. Lacy attended segregated schools in Monroe, Louisiana until the age of 10, when she and her family moved to McCloud, California.

In 1954, she graduated from high school in McCloud, CA, where she served as class president. She attended college at Chico State College in Chico, CA to study nursing. At age 19, while working as a student nurse at St. Francis Hospital in San Francisco, she contracted polio, which left her paralyzed and she began using a wheelchair.

Lacy began taking classes on special education at San Francisco State University in 1958, and wanted to specialize in speech therapy. The head of the department actively discouraged her enrollment and told her that if she applied he would deny her application. She was allowed to take classes, but when she graduated in 1960, she was not permitted to participate in the graduation ceremony.

As a black woman with a disability, Lacy often felt excluded from various advocacy communities, and fought relentlessly for a more intersectional approach to racial justice and disability rights.

== Career ==
In 1965, Lacy began working at the Oakland Economic Development Council, a program aimed at empowering people of color and people experiencing poverty. It was during her time here that she began consciously integrating her various identities – being black, a woman, and disabled – and thinking about how she could enact larger changes in society.

Lacy served as the first executive director of Community Resources for Independent Living (CRIL) in Hayward, California, from 1981 until her retirement in 1994. Shortly after she began working at CRIL, Lacy raised $350,000 to build a new multi-service center in Hayward, CA, which was the first independent living center in California designed and built specifically for the needs of the disabled community.

Johnnie Lacy was named Woman of the Year by the California State Senate in 1988.

After her retirement in 1994, Lacy remained active on Hayward city and community commissions, including the Commission on Personnel and Affirmative Action. She also served on Mayor's Disability Council for the city and county of San Francisco.
