= Being Heumann =

2026 American biographical drama film

- Release poster
- Directed by: Sian Heder
- Screenplay by: Sian Heder; Rebekah Taussig
- Based on: Being Heumann: An Unrepentant Memoir of a Disability Rights Activist by Judith Heumann
- Produced by: Kevin J. Walsh; David Permut; Sian Heder; John W. Beach; Kevin Cleary
- Starring: Ruth Madeley; Mark Ruffalo; Dylan O'Brien; Rob Delaney; Ray Fisher
- Cinematography: Jamie D. Ramsay
- Edited by: Geraud Brisson
- Music by: Francesco Le Metre
- Production companies: Apple Studios; The Walsh Company; Gravity Squared Entertainment; Permut Presentations; Paper People Films
- Distributed by: Apple TV
- Release dates: September 10, 2026 (TIFF); November 6, 2026 (United States); November 13, 2026 (Apple TV)
- Running time: 128 minutes
- Country: United States
- Language: English

Being Heumann is a 2026 American biographical drama film directed by Sian Heder, starring Ruth Madeley as disability rights activist Judith Heumann, and Mark Ruffalo as United States Secretary of Health and Human Services Joseph A. Califano Jr., who opposed the movement, led by Heumann, for the first U.S. federal civil rights protection for people with disabilities. The film is an adaptation of Heumann's memoir Being Heumann: An Unrepentant Memoir of a Disability Rights Activist along with being informed by interviews with 30 people who had been involved in the protests and an oral history document with Kitty Cone.

The film had its world premiere as the opening film of the Toronto International Film Festival on September 10, 2026, and released theatrically by Apple Studios on November 6, 2026. It received positive reviews from critics.

== Plot ==
During the start of Jimmy Carter's presidential term in 1977, Judith Heumann is a disability rights activist, wheelchair user, and polio survivor protesting against the delayed implementation of Section 504 of the Rehabilitation Act, legislation protecting access rights for disabled persons. The Rehabilitation Act was originally signed by Richard Nixon four years earlier, but concerns about costs had kept Section 504 in limbo, lacking the necessary implementation signature of the Secretary of Health, Education, and Welfare. Heumann's tactics include blocking traffic and lobbying the offices of Congressman George Miller and HEW Secretary Joseph A. Califano Jr. by phone.

When these tactics fail, Heumann and other disabled protestors start a sit-in at the regional HEW offices in San Francisco, refusing to leave the building until Section 504 is signed by Califano. After a few days, the building's phone lines and food supply are cut off, so Heumann decides to go on a hunger strike inspired by Gandhi. The phone lines are eventually restored, and Heumann is notified of Califano's plans to meet the protesters in person, only to be met with his staff. During this meeting, Heumann and the protestors testify about the reasons for their protest. When the building is evacuated due to a bomb threat, Heumann still refuses to leave. As a result, Heumann gets into an argument with her co-organizer, Kitty Cone, over their handling of the situation. Eventually, Hale Zukas, another protester with cerebral palsy, convinces some of the protesters, including Heumann, to fly to Washington, D.C. and confront Califano directly.

They attempt to wake Califano up by driving to his house in a Hertz rental truck, but Califano drives off, so the protesters resort to attempting to breach a press conference he is attending. The police attempt to arrest them but cannot due to the lack of accessible jail cells. After nearly four weeks of protest in DC and San Francisco, Heumann sees a televised news report of Califano signing Section 504 into law. She calls Cone about the protestors' victory, and Cone leads the remaining sit-in protestors out of the HEW building in celebration. Later, Califano calls Heumann and admits that his reluctance to sign Section 504 came from fears for his job.

Thirteen years later, protestors in Washington, D.C. lobby for the Americans with Disabilities Act of 1990 to be signed, thus expanding Section 504's regulations into every public building in the United States.

== Cast ==
- Ruth Madeley as Judith Heumann, a disability rights activist
- Mark Ruffalo as Joseph A. Califano Jr., the United States Secretary of Health, Education and Welfare
- Dylan O'Brien as Evan White, a reporter who embeds himself with Heumann and the other disability rights activists during their protests
- Madeline Delp as Kitty Cone, a disability rights activist who challenges Heumann's approach
- Rob Delaney as Congressman George Miller
- Ray Fisher as Chuck Jackson
- Michael Patrick Thornton as Ed Roberts
- Antwan Tolliver as Brad Lomax, a Black Panther and disability rights advocate
- Daniel Durant as Steve McCleeland
- Jon Beavers as Jim Pechin, Heumann's love interest
- Roberta Colindrez as Joni Breves, Heumann's bestfriend and fellow activist who acts as her on-and-off caregiver
- Russell Harvard as Olin Fortney
- Charlie Rush-Reese as Dennis Billups
- Joe Cobden as Hamilton Jordan
- Andrew Pilkington as Hale Zukas, a disability rights activist with cerebral palsy
- Siena Rafter as Lynette Taylor, an ASL interpreter
- Matthew Jeffers as Gerald
- Rein Barcel as Cece
- D'Arcee Charington Neal as Ron Washington
- Will Brill as Gene Eidenberg
- Rio Finnegan as Milton
- Lynnette Taylor as one of the protestors

== Production ==
The film is directed by Sian Heder, who – with Rebekah Taussig (author of Sitting Pretty: The View from My Ordinary Resilient Disabled Body) – adapted the Judy Heumann memoir, Being Heumann: An Unrepentant Memoir of a Disability Rights Activist. The film is from Apple Studios and is produced by David Permut and Kevin Walsh, whose Walsh Company has an overall deal with Apple. Heumann's managers, John W. Beach and Kevin Cleary of Gravity Squared Entertainment, are also producers.

In May 2025, Ruth Madeley was cast to play Heumann. Mark Ruffalo and Dylan O'Brien were added to the cast the following month. In July 2025, Madeline Delp, Rob Delaney, Ray Fisher, Michael Patrick Thornton, Antwan Tolliver, Daniel Durant, Jon Beavers, Roberta Colindrez, and Russell Harvard joined the cast.

Principal photography took place in Toronto in mid-2025.

== Release ==
In July 2026, Being Heumann was announced as the opening film of the Toronto International Film Festival. It further screened at the 15th Montclair Film Festival on October 17.

The film received a limited theatrical release on November 6, 2026, and on Apple TV on November 13.

== Reception ==
=== Critical response ===
On the review aggregator website Rotten Tomatoes, the film holds an approval rating of 88%, based on 89 reviews, with an average rating of 7.1/10. The website’s consensus reads: "Buoyed by humor, grit, and Ruth Madeley's complex performance, Being Heumann delivers a thoughtful and rousing account of disability rights activism." Metacritic, which uses a weighted average, assigned the film a score of 64 out of 100, based on 31 critics, indicating "generally favorable" reviews.

=== Accolades ===
Award	Date of ceremony	Category	Recipient(s)	Result	Ref.
Toronto International Film Festival	September 20, 2026	Jeff Skoll Award in Impact Media	Sian Heder	Honored	
Toronto International Film Festival	September 20, 2026	People's Choice Award	Being Heumann	2nd Runner-up	
