= Patrisha Wright =

American disability rights activist

- Occupation: Disability rights activist
- Known for: Instrumental in enacting the Americans with Disabilities Act, co-founder of the Disability Rights Education and Defense Fund (DREDF)
- Awards: George Bush Medal (2000); Presidential Citizens Medal (2001)

Patrisha Wright is an American disability rights activist. She is legally blind. She was instrumental in enacting the Americans with Disabilities Act.

== Activism ==
She was at the San Francisco sit-in to support Section 504 of the Rehabilitation Act in April 1977, as a personal assistant to Judy Heumann. In 1979 she cofounded the Disability Rights Education and Defense Fund (DREDF) with Mary Lou Breslin and Robert Funk. From 1979 until 2005 she worked as Director of Government Affairs for DREDF. She fought for the enactment of the Handicapped Children's Protection Act of 1986 and amendments to the Fair Housing Act regarding people with disabilities. Wright represented disability concerns in an alliance of civil rights groups that were all working to pass the Civil Rights Restoration Act of 1987.

Also in the 1980s, when the Reagan administration threatened to amend or revoke regulations implementing Section 504 of the (American) Rehabilitation Act of 1973 and the Education for All Handicapped Children Act of 1975, Wright and Evan Kemp (of the Disability Rights Center) led a grassroots and lobbying campaign against this that generated more than 40,000 cards and letters. In 1984, the administration dropped its attempts to amend or revoke those regulations; however, they did end the Social Security benefits of hundreds of thousands of disabled recipients.

Wright is widely considered the main force behind the campaign lobbying for the Americans with Disabilities Act, and she is known as "the General" for her work in coordinating the campaign to enact the Act.

In 2000, she was awarded the George Bush Medal for her disability rights work.

In 2001 she was awarded the Presidential Citizens Medal.

She is Secretary; Vice-President of the Baja Coastal Institute.
