= Joseph A. Califano Jr. =

American politician (born 1931)

Joe Califano
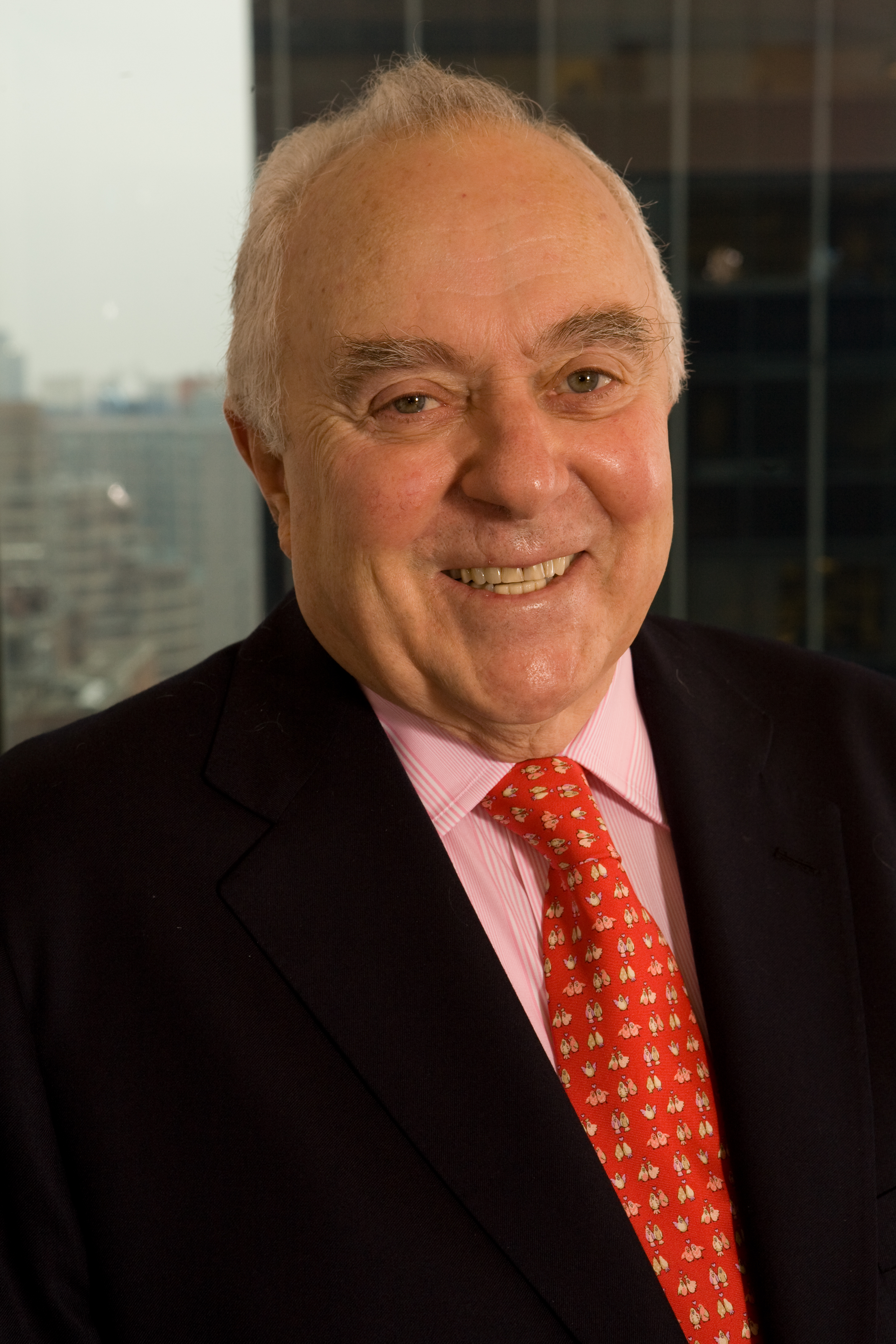
- Califano in 2008

12th United States Secretary of Health, Education, and Welfare
- In office January 25, 1977 – August 3, 1979
- President: Jimmy Carter
- Preceded by: F. David Mathews
- Succeeded by: Patricia Roberts Harris

White House Domestic Affairs Advisor
- In office July 26, 1965 – January 20, 1969
- President: Lyndon B. Johnson
- Preceded by: Position established
- Succeeded by: Pat Moynihan (Urban Affairs)

Personal details
- Born: Joseph Anthony Califano Jr. May 15, 1931 (age 95) New York City, New York, U.S.
- Party: Democratic
- Spouse: Hilary Byers (m. 1983)
- Children: 5
- Education: College of the Holy Cross (BA); Harvard University (LLB)

Military service
- Allegiance: United States
- Branch/service: United States Navy
- Years of service: 1955–1958
- Rank: Lieutenant

Joseph Anthony Califano Jr. (born May 15, 1931) is an American lawyer who served as the 12th United States Secretary of Health and Human Services from 1977 to 1979, under President Jimmy Carter. He was previously White House Domestic Affairs Advisor under President Lyndon Johnson from 1965 to 1969.

Califano is known for the roles he played in shaping welfare policies in the cabinets of Presidents Lyndon B. Johnson and Jimmy Carter. He founded the National Center on Addiction and Substance Abuse (now the Partnership to End Addiction) at Columbia University.

Califano has been an adjunct professor of public health at the Columbia University College of Physicians and Surgeons and is a member of the Institute of Medicine of the National Academy of Sciences.

== Early life ==
Califano was born in Brooklyn, New York, on May 15, 1931 and was raised in Crown Heights. His father, Joseph Anthony Califano, was an Italian American. His mother, Katherine (Gill) Califano, was a schoolteacher of Irish descent. He attended St. Gregory's Elementary School and Brooklyn Preparatory School in Brooklyn, New York City.

Califano graduated from the College of the Holy Cross in Worcester, Massachusetts, with a Bachelor of Arts in English literature with honors in 1952. As an undergraduate at Holy Cross, he wrote a senior thesis on the writer F. Scott Fitzgerald. He then earned his Bachelor of Laws (LL.B.) from Harvard Law School in 1955. As a law student, he became a member of the Harvard Legal Aid Bureau and an editor of the Harvard Law Review.

== Military and Department of Defense ==
In 1955, Califano enlisted in the United States Navy as an officer candidate. He was commissioned an ensign in November 1955, served three years in the Office of the Judge Advocate General in Washington, D.C., and was released to inactive duty in October 1958, as a lieutenant. He associated with the law firm of Dewey Ballantine in New York City from October 1958, until April 1961.

In April 1961, Califano became Special Assistant to the General Counsel of the U. S. Department of Defense. In July 1962, he was appointed Special Assistant to the United States Secretary of the Army. On July 1, 1963, he was appointed General Counsel of the Army. He also served as Special Assistant to the Secretary of the Army for Civil Functions, supervising the U.S. Army Corps of Engineers' Civil Works Program and was a member of the President's Appalachian Regional Commission. In early 1964, Califano was selected to serve as the principal legal advisor to the United States Delegation to the Investigating Committee of the Organization of American States on the Panama riots of January 1964. Subsequently, he was also selected to present the United States case before the International Commission of Jurists during hearings held in Panama dealing with those riots. In recognition of his work as General Counsel of the Department of the Army, Califano was awarded the Distinguished Civilian Service Medal, the highest civilian award of the Army.

On April 1, 1964, Califano was appointed Special Assistant to the Secretary and Deputy Secretary of Defense. He had special responsibilities for Department of Defense liaison with the Office of the President of the United States. He also acted as Executive Secretary of the President's Advisory Committee on Supersonic Transport, as the Department of Defense representative on the President's Committee on the Economic Impact of Defense and Disarmament, and as a member of the Federal Radiation Council. In recognition of his work as the Special Assistant to the Secretary and Deputy Secretary of Defense, Califano was awarded the Defense Distinguished Service Medal of the Department of Defense. Between March 21 and 25, 1965, Califano was assigned to monitor the progress of the historic March from Selma to Montgomery which helped ensure the passage of the landmark Voting Rights Act of 1965.

Califano was appointed Special Assistant to President Lyndon B. Johnson on July 26, 1965. In this position, Califano served as LBJ's chief domestic aide, developing the President's legislative program as well as helping coordinate economic policies and handling domestic crises. He also worked on a variety of domestic problems, including labor-management relations, balance of payments, health care, education, environmental and urban issues, and civil rights. He served in this position until January 20, 1969. While in this post, The New York Times called him "The Deputy President for Domestic Affairs."

== Civilian career ==
Califano was a member of the Washington law firm of Arnold & Porter from March 1969 until May 1971. He was a member of the Washington law firm of Williams, Connolly & Califano from June 1971 until January 1977.

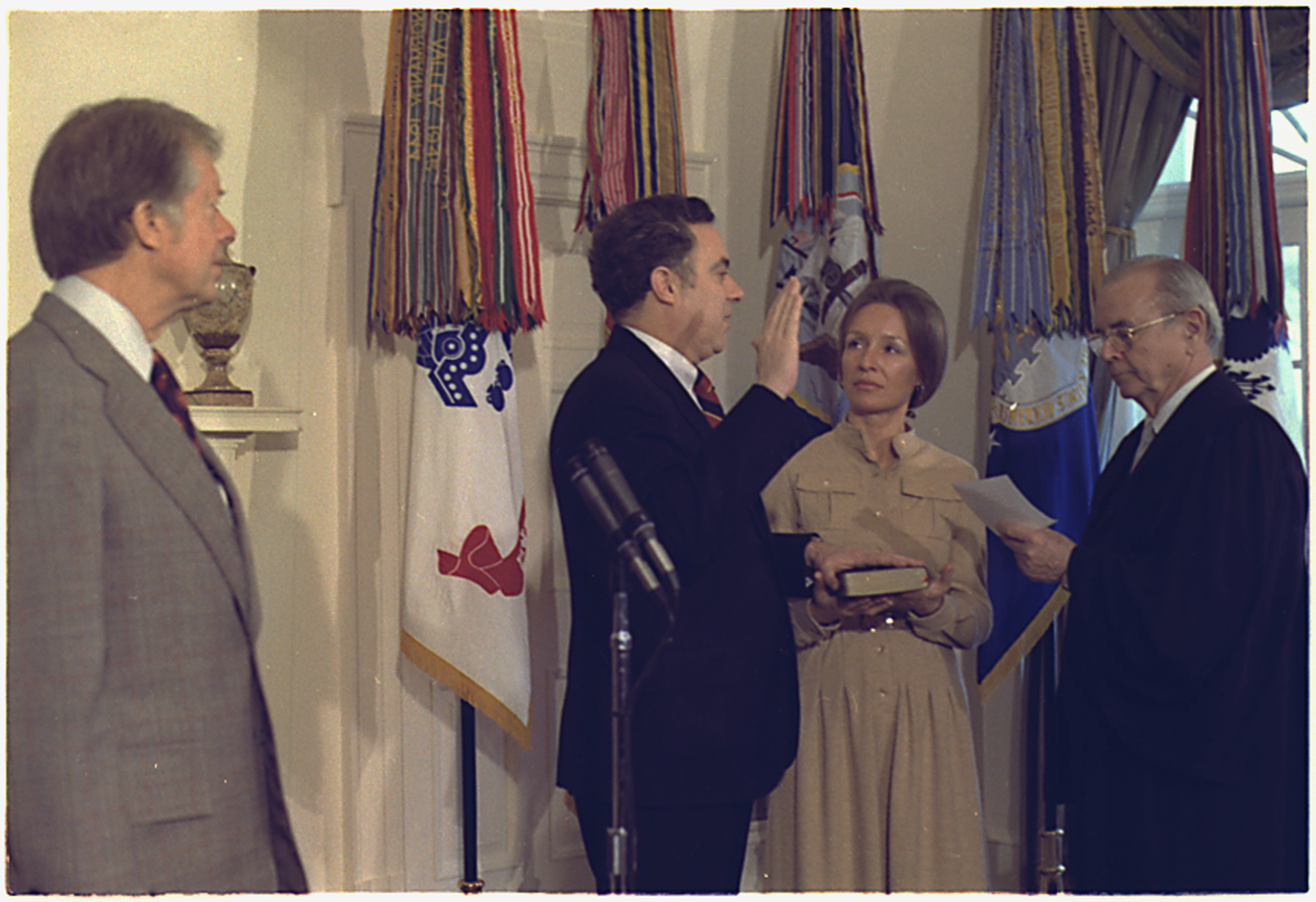
Califano was sworn in as Secretary of HEW.

In January 1977, Califano became Secretary of Health, Education, and Welfare. He served in that Cabinet post until August 1979. He put the department through the most complete reorganization in its twenty-five year history; created the Health Care Financing Administration (HCFA) to run Medicare and Medicaid; mounted major health promotion and disease prevention programs, including childhood immunization, the first national anti-smoking campaign, an alcoholism initiative, and issuance of Healthy People, the initial Surgeon General's Report on Health Promotion and Disease Prevention which for the first time set health goals for the American people; began the collection of hundreds of millions of dollars of defaulted student loans, and instituted computerized techniques to police welfare, Medicare and Medicaid programs; worked with the Congress to maintain the financial integrity of the Social Security system, contain health care costs, and restructure Federal aid to elementary, secondary and higher education; and issued the first regulations to provide equal athletic opportunity to women under Title IX and to provide equal opportunity to the handicapped.

As Secretary, Califano opposed the Burger Court's Regents of the University of California v. Bakke decision limiting affirmative action and pressed the Carter administration to administer stronger desegregation policies. However, initially he refused to sign meaningful regulations for Section 504 of the Rehabilitation Act of 1973, which was the first U.S. federal civil rights protection for people with disabilities. After an ultimatum and deadline, demonstrations took place in ten U.S. cities on April 5, 1977, including the 504 Sit-in at the regional HEW offices. This sit-in, led by Judith Heumann and organized by Kitty Cone, lasted until April 30, 1977, 25 days, with more than 150 people refusing to leave. It is the longest non-violent sit-in at a federal building to date. Califano signed the revised regulations on April 28, 1977.

As Secretary, Califano also funded the nation's first free standing hospice in Branford, Connecticut, and issued regulations to make Medicare reimbursement available for hospice care.

In 1979, as Secretary, Califano directed the Public Health Service to eliminate its official characterization of homosexuality as "a mental disease or defect" which immigration authorities had used to deny individuals entry to the United States solely because of their sexual orientation.

In 1979, Califano led a United States delegation to China on a trip which resulted in long-term institutionalization of health and education links between the two countries. The CIA sought to send a covert agent on the trip but Califano refused, insisting that a CIA agent would have to be identified as such to the Chinese government. This occurred, and China consented to the identified CIA agent as part of the delegation.

Despite his accomplishments, Califano did not get along with President Jimmy Carter because his policies needed increased social spending and interfered with Carter's campaign pledge to eliminate deficit spending by 1980. Califano also opposed Carter's commitment to create a separate Department of Education, because in Califano's view the federal government's comparatively limited education funding was better protected as part of a huge institution like the Department of Health, Education, and Welfare. Likewise, Califano and Carter's most senior aides had disagreements. Carter dismissed Califano on July 19, 1979, replacing him with Secretary of Housing and Urban Development Patricia Roberts Harris. Afterwards, Congressman Charlie Wilson said of Califano's firing- "Good grief! He's cut down the tall trees and left the monkeys." Ralph Nader compared it to "firing Mickey Mantle because he couldn't get along with the bat boy."

== Post-administration life ==
In January 1980, Califano formed the law firm of Califano, Ross & Heineman in Washington, D.C. From 1983 until 1992, he was senior partner and head of the Washington office of Dewey Ballantine LLP.

In 1987, New York governor Mario Cuomo appointed Califano Chair of the New York State Commission on Government Integrity; he was replaced a few months later by John Feerick, allegedly because Califano no longer resided in New York.

In 1992, he founded The National Center on Addiction and Substance Abuse at Columbia University, which is now the Partnership to End Addiction.

Califano has written articles for The New York Times, The Washington Post, The Wall Street Journal, Reader's Digest, New Republic, Journal of the American Medical Association, The New England Journal of Medicine, America, The Washington Monthly, and other publications.

He was Founding Chairman of the Board of the Institute for Social and Economic Policy in the Middle East at the John F. Kennedy School of Government at Harvard University.

Califano has served as a director of CBS Corporation and Willis Group Holdings, Ltd. He is a Trustee of New York-Presbyterian Hospital, the Urban Institute, the Ditchley Foundation, the LBJ Foundation, and the National Health Museum; Trustee Emeritus of the John F. Kennedy Center for the Performing Arts. Mr. Califano is a member of the Council on Foreign Relations. He is also a former trustee of The Century Foundation and a former member of the advisory council of the American Foundation for AIDS Research.

== Awards ==
In 2010, Califano received the Gustav O. Lienhard Award from the Institute of Medicine for his contributions to improving public health, his leadership in catalyzing federal action to curb smoking and his broader efforts to reduce the toll of addiction and substance abuse.

In November 2011, the Columbia Spectator editorial board published a piece titled "Cut ties to CASA", stating that "the methods that CASA uses to research substance abuse are shoddy and questionable, and reports of CASA's "findings" are often misleading and sensationalized" and that "Califano's outlandish claims reflect on the integrity of the organization, and unfortunately on Columbia's as well." Contrary to the claims made in the Spectator article, the organization's research staff has published more than 190 articles or book chapters in professional and peer-reviewed publications, including 121 articles in peer-reviewed journals including the Journal of the American Medical Association, the Journal of Adolescent Health, the Annals of Internal Medicine and the New England Journal of Medicine.

== Popular culture ==
In the 2026 Judith Heumann biopic, Being Heumann, which covers the Section 504 sit-ins, he is portrayed by Mark Ruffalo.

== Books ==
- Our Damaged Democracy, Simon & Schuster/Atria Books, 2018
- How to Raise a Drug Free Kid: The Straight Dope for Parents, Touchstone/Fireside Division, 2009
- High Society: How Substance Abuse Ravages America and What To Do About It, PublicAffairs Press, 2007
- Inside: A Public and Private Life, PublicAffairs Press, 2004
- The Triumph and Tragedy of Lyndon Johnson: The White House Years, Simon & Schuster, 1991

Califano is the author of fourteen books. In early 1969, he traveled around the world on a study of the "student-youth-and-establishment" problem under a Ford Foundation grant. He wrote about those travels in his book, The Student Revolution: A Global Confrontation, published by W. W. Norton in 1969. Califano's second book, A Presidential Nation, was published by W. W. Norton in 1975. His third, The Media and the Law, was published by Praeger Special Studies in 1976 and was co-authored and co-edited with Howard Simons, Managing Editor of The Washington Post. His fourth, The Media and Business, was published by Random House in 1978 and was also in collaboration with Mr. Simons.

In May 1981, Simon and Schuster published Califano's fifth book, Governing America: An Insider's Report from the White House and the Cabinet, about his years as Secretary of HEW. In June 1982, Warner Books published his sixth, The 1982 Report on Drug Abuse and Alcoholism. Califano's seventh book, America's Health Care Revolution: Who Lives? Who Dies? Who Pays?, was published by Random House in 1986. His eighth book, The Triumph and Tragedy of Lyndon Johnson: The White House Years, was published by Simon and Schuster in 1991 and republished by Texas A & M University Press in 2000. His ninth book, Radical Surgery: What's Next for America's Health Care, was published by Random House in January 1995.

== Personal life ==
He married Hilary Byers in 1983.

Government offices
Preceded by Powell Pierpoint	General Counsel of the Army; 1963–1964	Succeeded by Alfred B. Fitt
Political offices
New office	White House Domestic Affairs Advisor; 1965–1969	Succeeded by Pat Moynihan as White House Urban Affairs Advisor
Preceded by F. David Mathews	United States Secretary of Health, Education, and Welfare; 1977–1979	Succeeded by Patricia Roberts Harris
U.S. order of precedence (ceremonial)
Preceded by W. Michael Blumenthal as Former U.S. Cabinet Member	Order of precedence of the United States as Former U.S. Cabinet Member	Succeeded by Ray Marshall as Former U.S. Cabinet Member
