= Independent living =

Housing and community arrangements that maximize independence and self-determination

Independent living (IL), as seen by its advocates, is a philosophy, a way of looking at society and disability, and a worldwide movement of disabled people working for equal opportunities, self-determination, and self-respect. In the context of eldercare, independent living is seen as a step in the continuum of care, with assisted living being the next step.

In most countries, proponents of the independent living movement claim preconceived notions and a predominantly medical view of disability contribute to negative attitudes towards people with disabilities, portraying them as sick, defective and deviant persons, as objects of professional intervention, or as a burden for themselves and their families. These images have consequences for disabled people's opportunities for raising families of their own, getting education and work, which may result in persons with disabilities living in poverty. The alternative to the medical model of disability is the social model of disability.

With the rise in senior population, independent living facilities have risen in popularity as an option for aging citizens.

== History in USA ==
The Independent Living Movement grew out of the disability rights movement, which began in the 1960s. The IL Movement works at replacing the special education and rehabilitation experts' concepts of integration, normalization and rehabilitation with a new paradigm developed by people with disabilities themselves. The first Independent Living ideologists and organizers were people with extensive disabilities (e.g., Ed Roberts, Hale Zukas, Judith Heumann, Peg Nosek, Johnnie Lacy, Beverly Chapman, Lex Frieden) and of course, early friends and collaborators in the 1970s (Julie Ann Racino) and university and government supporters throughout the 1980s and 1990s. Ed Roberts was a quadriplegic who dealt with discrimination in many different aspects of his life. His fight for acceptance in schools, however, is what Roberts is most well known for. In high school, Roberts was stopped from graduating because he could not complete his gym requirement, as he was paralyzed and spent most of his time in an iron lung. His biggest educational challenge came when he was accepted at college. After struggling to get accepted, UC Berkeley refused to give Roberts financial aid. He then sued Berkeley for access and integration. Although he won the case, Roberts was housed in the school's infirmary instead of the dorms. As others with disabilities started attending the school and living in the infirmary, an activist group called the Rolling Quads was formed. They ended up starting the Disabled Students' Program, a resource for those with disabilities that was run by people with disabilities. This program led to the first independent living center in America being made, the Berkeley Center for Independent Living. These centers flourished across the United States and are a huge part of why Ed Roberts was so instrumental in the start of the Independent Living Movement. As well, a major project in Berkeley, California led by Roberts and others at the Center for Independent Living led to curb cuts up and down Telegraph and Shattuck Avenues creating an extensive path of travel.

== Philosophy ==
"Independent Living does not mean that we want to do everything by ourselves, do not need anybody or like to live in isolation. Independent Living means that we demand the same choices and control in our every-day lives that our non-disabled brothers and sisters, neighbors and friends take for granted. We want to grow up in our families, go to the neighborhood school, use the same bus as our neighbors, work in jobs that are in line with our education and interests, and raise families of our own. We are profoundly ordinary people sharing the same need to feel included, recognized and loved."

== History in Canada ==
Canada's history of independence, home living, and the independent living movement can be traced back to the industrial revolution of the 19th century. The industrial revolution precipitated rapid changes in the structure of society and the paid and unpaid labour economies. The distribution of labour changed when farm workers and their families, replaced by technology on farms, migrated from small rural communities to large urban centres in search of gainful employment in industry. The redistribution of paid agricultural labour to industry created a shortage of unpaid domestic care for disabled and dependent persons whose caregivers also became occupied with paid industrial labour. The taken-for-granted economy of care (previously unpaid and supported by families and small rural communities) was disrupted, and industrialised communities suffered ballooning levels of homelessness and poverty as a consequence of an industrialised social structure.

Urban communities pushed governments for an ethical solution to the problem of uncared for disabled and dependent persons. Provincial governments responded by building and funding medical institutions, however, institutional care was deeply flawed. Institutionalised care created a paternalistic and segregated system that medicalised the identities of disabled and dependent persons and actively participated in the abuse of their human rights.

In the late 20th century, a social movement called the independent living movement fought to re-identify disabled and dependent persons as people with beliefs, values, dreams, and identities that extended beyond their medical diagnoses. The overarching goal of the movement was to gain choice and control for dependent and disabled persons in the delivery of health and social care through state-supported community re-integration and care.

The independent living movement found significant support for deinstitutionalisation through another ideological movement known as neoliberalism. Neoliberal thinkers oppose state interventions such as institutional care, promoting competitive market-based care delivery systems as cost-effective solutions to care for dependent and disabled persons. With support from both movements, community care gained popularity as a moral and cost-effective alternative to institutional care.

Deinstitutionalisation coincided with an economic downturn in the 1980s. The goals of the independent living movement - choice, control, and quality care - were essentially co-opted by neoliberal ideals of cost-control, self-sufficiency, and minimalist state intervention. Deinstitutionalisation occurred alongside health and welfare service restructuring in a concerted effort to reduce public spending and improve the efficiency of formal care. Service reductions were justified by neoliberal beliefs that all people ought to be independent, or at least have families that could provide support. Community care has been structured as a compromise between neoliberal values and the lived realities of disabled and dependent persons of the independent living movement.

Home care, or home-based community care, came into effect in the 1980s in most Canadian Provinces as one policy solution to bridge the gap between institutional and community care. The transition is ongoing and contentious. Home care is not covered under the 1984 Canada Health Act, and the provincial and federal governments tend to squabble over funding. All levels of government are pressured to limit spending while maintaining equitable and accessible services for disabled and dependent persons. The result is a fragile system of provincially run community care services that ration medical care while avoiding the complex social issue of long-term community care reform. Canadian policymakers talk about a social model of disability and typically recognise that this model is preferred by disabled persons, however, the policy reality of independent living falls closer to a model that combines biomedical and neoliberal ideologies while neglecting social and environmental determinants of ability. Independent living remains difficult for many people and institutionalisation is offered as an ongoing practical solution to meeting care needs. Noticeable in the ideological push for independent living is the marketisation of institutional care as independent living in 21st century Canada. Funding is through a decentralised mix of publicly paid, private-for-profit, and private-not-for-profit systems. Beyond home care, community care is offered through a variety of service delivery models including supportive living, assisted living, and long-term care.

These newer forms of institutional care attempt to maximise independent living while minimising care provided, both to support disabled and dependent person's identified needs and to control costs in the formal care economy. Unmet needs of deinstitutionalised care-dependent people may be absorbed by families and communities via the unpaid care economy, into existing systems of acute and primary care, or be left unaddressed.

== In Germany ==
Analogous to the Russell Tribunal by Amnesty International, the cripple tribunal denounced human rights violations of disabled people.

== Centers for Independent Living ==
In 1972, the first Center for Independent Living was founded by disability activists, led by Ed Roberts, in Berkeley, California. These Centers were created to offer peer support and role modeling, and are run and controlled by persons with disabilities. According to the IL approach, the example of a peer, somebody who has been in a similar situation, can be more powerful than a non-disabled professional's interventions in analyzing one's situation, in assuming responsibility for one's life and in developing coping strategies.

According to the IL Movement, with peer support, everyone – including persons with extensive developmental disabilities – can learn to take more initiative and control over their lives. For example, peer support is used in Independent Living Skills classes where people living with their families or in institutions learn how to run their everyday lives in preparation for living by themselves.

There is a fundamental set of services (Core Services) found in all of the Centers, but there is some variation in the programs that are offered, the funding sources, and the staffing, among other things. Depending on the public services in the community, Centers might assist with housing referral and adaptation, personal assistance referral, or legal aid. Typically, Centers work with local and regional governments to improve infrastructure, raise awareness about disability issues and lobby for legislation that promotes equal opportunities and prohibits discrimination. Centers in states like California, Massachusetts, New York, Pennsylvania, and Illinois have proven to be effective in facilitating independent living for those with disabilities, as well as empowering disabled people to advocate for themselves, to provide peer support to one another, and to co-create community across differences in conditions, access needs, and abilities.

In the UK, the British Council of Organisations of Disabled People (BCODP, 1981–2017) started the National Centre for Independent Living (NCIL, 1989–2011) as a project, which became a spin-out independent organisation in the early 2000s before merging with two other organisations to form Disability Rights UK in January 2012. All these organisations subscribe to the Social Model of Disability.

== See also ==
- Accessibility
- Aging in place
- Camp Jened
- Dignity of risk
- Disability rights movement
- Independent senior living
- Intellectual disability
- List of disability rights activists
- Mainstreaming (education)
- Occupational therapy
- Person-centred planning
- Post-Polio Health International
- Self-advocacy
- Social model of disability
- Timeline of disability rights in the United States
- Timeline of disability rights outside the United States
- Visitability – social integration beyond independent living
