= Ed Roberts (activist) =

American activist

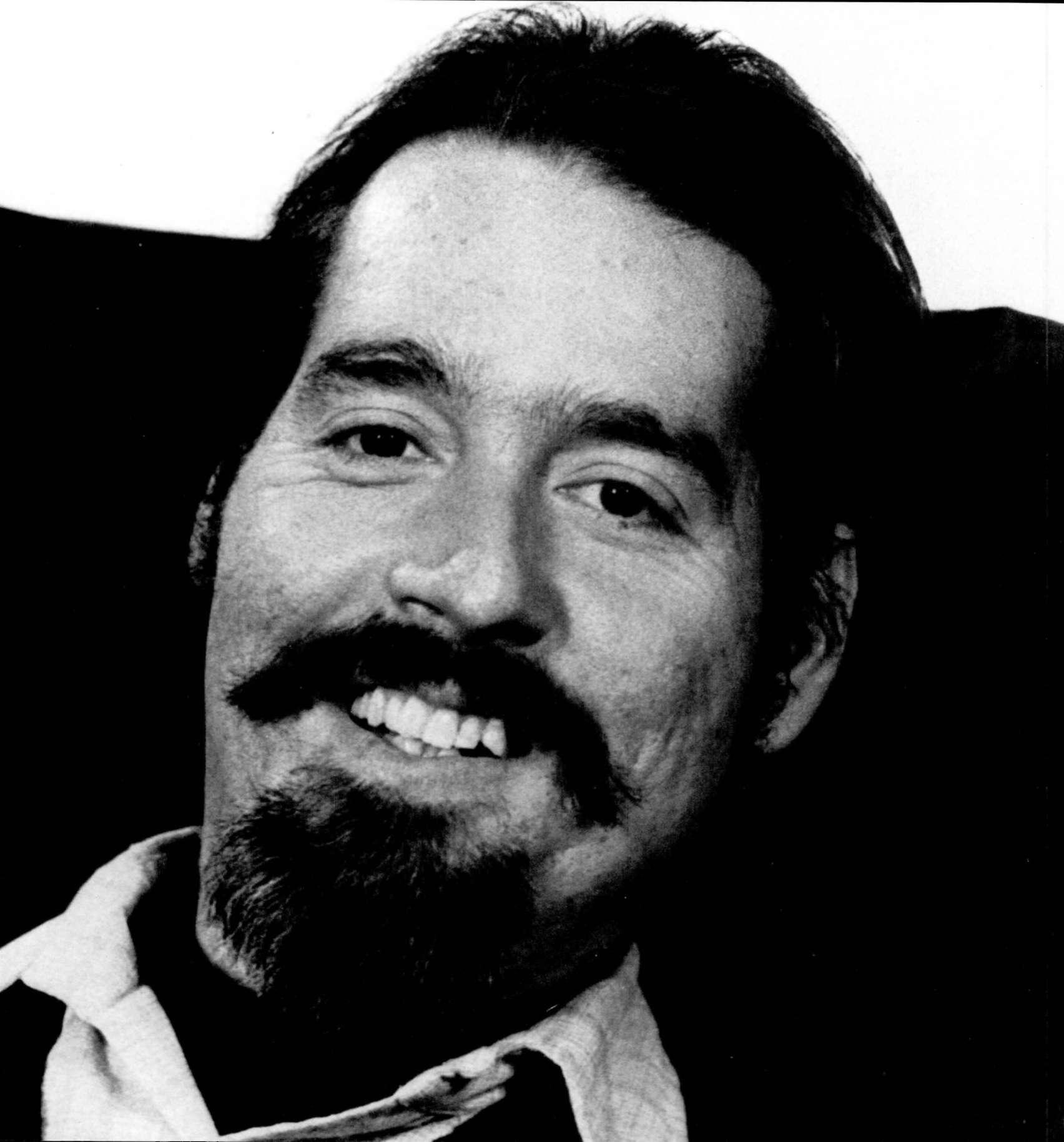
- Born: Edward Verne Roberts; January 23, 1939; San Mateo , California , U.S
- Died: March 14, 1995 (aged 56); Berkeley, California, United States
- Occupation: Disability rights activist
- Spouse: Catherine Dugan (1976–1982)
- Children: 1

Edward Verne Roberts (January 23, 1939 – March 14, 1995) was an American activist. He was the first wheelchair user to attend the University of California, Berkeley and a pioneering leader of the disability rights movement.

== Biography ==
=== Early life ===
Roberts was born in San Mateo, California. He contracted polio at the age of fourteen in 1953, two years before the Salk vaccine ended the epidemic. He spent eighteen months in hospitals and returned home paralyzed from the neck down except for two fingers on his left hand and two toes on his left foot. He slept in an iron lung at night and often rested there during the day. When out of the lung he survived by "frog breathing," a technique for forcing air into the lungs using facial and neck muscles.

He attended Burlingame High School by telephone communication until his mother, Zona, insisted that he attend school once a week for a few hours. At school, he faced his deep fear of being stared at and transformed his sense of personal identity. He gave up thinking of himself as a "helpless cripple," and decided to think of himself as a "star." He credited his parents with teaching him by example how to fight for what he needed.

=== Activism ===
Roberts is often called the father of the Independent Living movement. His career as an advocate began when a high school administrator threatened to deny him his diploma because he had not completed driver's education and physical education. After attending the College of San Mateo, he was admitted to the University of California, Berkeley. He had to fight for the support he needed to attend college from the California Department of Vocational Rehabilitation because his rehabilitation counselor thought he was too severely disabled to ever get a job. Upon learning that Roberts had a severe disability, one of the UC Berkeley deans commented, "We've tried cripples before, and they just don't work out." Other Berkeley administrators supported admitting Roberts, and expressed the opinion that the university should do more.

Roberts was admitted in 1962, two years before the Free Speech Movement transformed Berkeley into a hotbed of student protest. When his search for housing met resistance in part because of the 800-pound iron lung that he slept in at night, the director of the campus health service offered him a room in an empty wing of the Cowell Hospital. Roberts accepted on the condition that the area where he lived be treated as dormitory space, not a medical facility. His admission broke the ice for other students with severe disabilities, who joined him over the next few years at what evolved into the Cowell Residence Program.

The group developed a sense of identity and élan, and began to formulate a political analysis of disability. They began calling themselves the "Rolling Quads" to the surprise of some non-disabled observers who had never before heard a positive expression of disability identity. In 1968, when a rehabilitation counselor threatened two of the Rolling Quads with eviction from the Cowell Residence, the Rolling Quads organized a successful "revolt" that led to the counselor's transfer.

Their success on campus inspired the group to begin advocating for curb cuts, opening access to the wider community, and to create the Physically Disabled Student's Program (PDSP) — the first student-led disability services program in the country. Roberts flew 3,000 miles, from California to Washington, D.C., with no respiratory support, to attend a conference at the start-up of the Federal TRIO Program through which the PDSP later secured funding. The PDSP provided services including attendant referral and wheelchair repair to students at the university, but it was soon taking calls from people with disabilities with the same concerns who were not students.

He earned B.A. (1964) and M.A. (1966) degrees in political science from UC Berkeley. He became an official Ph.D. candidate (C.Phil.) in political science at Berkeley in 1969, but never completed his doctoral dissertation.

The need to serve the wider community led activists to create the Berkeley Center for Independent Living (CIL), the first independent living service and advocacy program run by and for people with disabilities. Contrary to common belief, Roberts did not found the Berkeley CIL, nor was he the CIL's first executive director. At the time, he taught political science at Nairobi College, an "alternative college," but returned to Berkeley to assume leadership of the fledgling organization. He guided the CIL's rapid growth during a decisive time for the emerging disability rights movement. The CIL provided a model for a new kind of community organization designed to address the needs and concerns of people with a wide range of disabilities. A major project in Berkeley, California led by Roberts and others at the CIL led to curb cuts up and down Telegraph and Shattuck Avenues, creating an extensive path of travel. Following this, the value of curb cuts was promoted more strongly and their installment was often made on a voluntary basis by municipal authorities and developers.

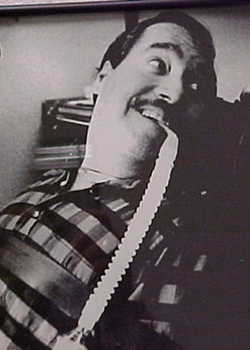
Roberts was appointed as the director of the California Department of Vocational Rehabilitation in 1976 by Governor Jerry Brown.

In 1975, newly elected Governor Jerry Brown appointed Roberts Director of the California Department of Vocational Rehabilitation—the same agency that had once labelled him too severely disabled to work. He served in that post until 1983. When California politics again shifted to the right, he returned again to Berkeley, where he co-founded the World Institute on Disability with Judith E. Heumann and Joan Leon. Roberts served as president of WID until his death.

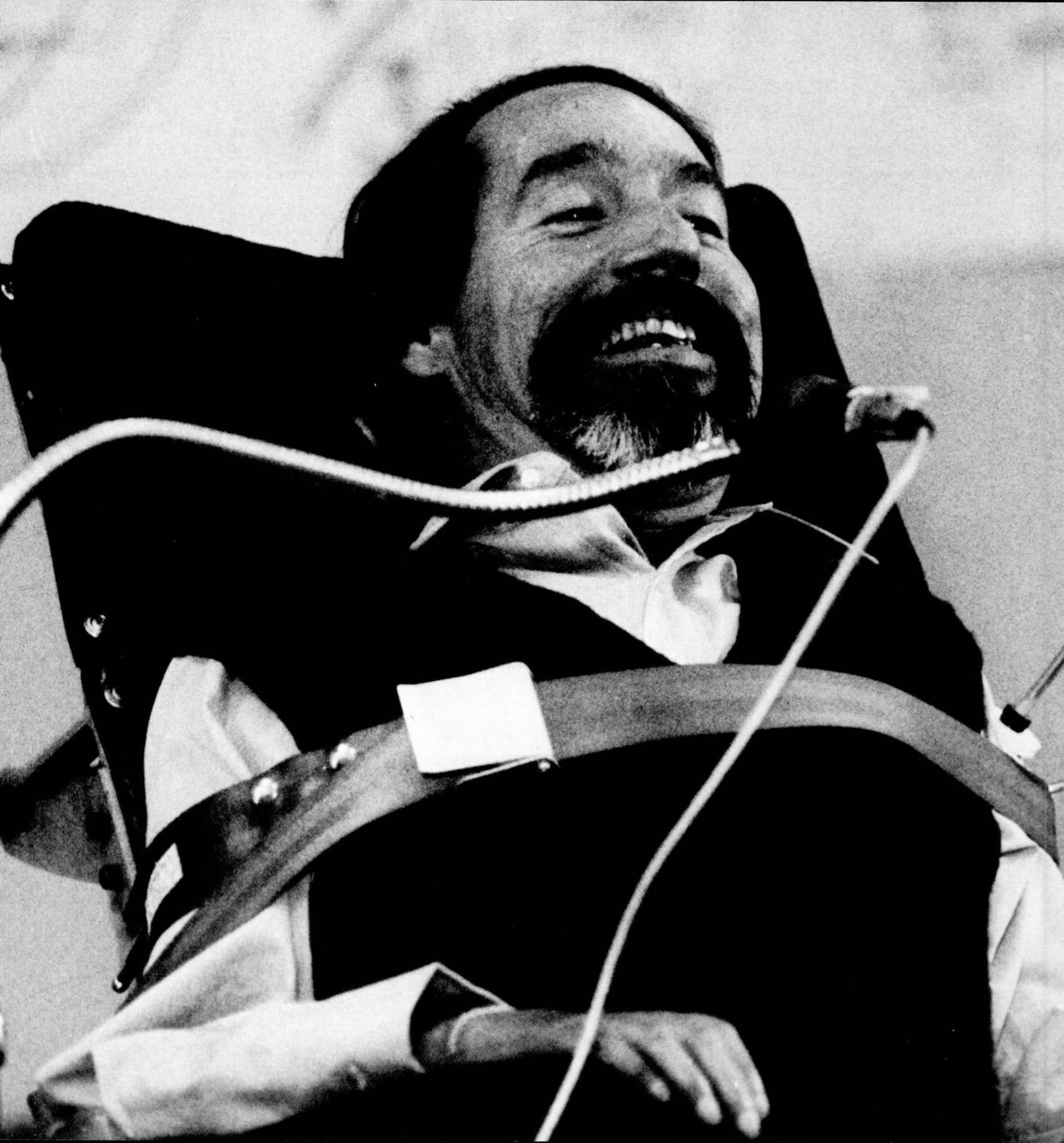
Roberts speaking at a disability leadership conference in 1981

Before the Americans with Disabilities Act of 1990 was passed, Roberts realized that many of the buildings at UC Berkeley were not accessible to him or other wheelchair users. Disability rights activists wanted to end discrimination and have rights for people with disabilities that were mandated and protected by the law. In what came to be called the Section 504 Sit-in, Roberts and his peers demonstrated to enforce Section 504 of the Rehabilitation Act of 1973, which stated that people with disabilities should not be excluded from activities, denied the right to receive benefits, or be discriminated against, from any program that uses federal financial assistance, solely because of their disability. For 28 days, activists occupied the offices of the Carter Secretary of Health, Education and Welfare building located in San Francisco. The government staff refused to assist the protesters. Other minority groups such as Black Panthers, the Butterfly Brigade, and an anti gay violence group supported the disability rights movement and brought in food along with other materials to assist the protesters. While the protesters gathered, Roberts spoke to motivate the crowds of people. Eventually, government officials agreed to a congressional hearing which was held in the building. The testimonies of Roberts along with other activists were so compelling that the representative from the Department of Health, Education and Welfare joined the sit-in. Section 504 was signed into law by Richard Nixon but was not implemented until Jimmy Carter's administration. These acts of resistance paved the way for the creation of the Americans with Disabilities Act of 1990.

=== Personal life and death ===
Roberts married Catherine Dugan in 1976; the couple divorced in 1982. They shared custody of their son Lee together.

Roberts died on March 14, 1995, at the age of 56 at his home in Berkeley. His attendant said the cause of death was cardiac arrest, but later reporting identified the cause as a stroke.

=== Legacy ===
Hundreds of Centers for Independent Living around the world are based on his original model. These Centers for Independent Living established the National Council on Independent Living, which holds a meeting every summer in Washington, D.C. At the one held after his passing, on May 15, 1995, Roberts' empty wheelchair was towed by his friend Mike Boyd to lead hundreds of supporters on a memorial march from the United States Capitol to a vigil in his honor in the Dirksen Senate Office Building. Speakers at this vigil included Senator Tom Harkin of Iowa, Representative Steny Hoyer of Maryland, Judith Heumann, and Paul Hearne.

His papers are held at the Bancroft Library at UC Berkeley. Roberts has been termed the father of the independent living movement in the U.S. Roberts is highlighted in Joseph Shapiro's 1993 book, No Pity: People with Disabilities Forging a New Civil Rights Movement.

== Awards and recognition ==
Ed Roberts was made a MacArthur Fellow in 1984. In 1995, the National Museum of American History accepted the gift of Roberts' wheelchair as part of its collections documenting the disabilities rights movement.

In 2010, California Governor Arnold Schwarzenegger signed into law a bill by State Senator Loni Hancock (D-09) that declared January 23 of every year (Roberts' birthday) a day of special significance. Around the same time, a multi-agency independent living center in Berkeley, California known as the Ed Roberts Campus, had its grand opening. In 2011, Roberts was inducted into the California Hall of Fame.

In 2014, the Berkeley Rotary Club gave its annual Rotary Peace Grove Award to Roberts and Judith Heumann. In 2017, on what would have been his 78th birthday, Roberts was honored with a Google Doodle in recognition of his activism.

== Popular culture ==
In the 2026 Judith Heumann biopic, Being Heumann, which covers the Section 504 sit-ins, he is portrayed by Michael Patrick Thornton.

== See also ==
- Independent living
- List of disability rights activists
