= Section 504 of the Rehabilitation Act =

1973 American disability rights legislation

Section 504 of the Rehabilitation Act of 1973 is American legislation that guarantees certain rights to people with disabilities. It requires that people with disabilities are able to take part in all programs that receive federal funding, while being free from discrimination. It was one of the first U.S. federal civil rights laws that offered legal protections for people with disabilities. Section 504 set precedents for subsequent legislation that expanded the rights of people with disabilities and kickstarted a political movement in the United States for people with disabilities, resulting in the passage of the Americans with Disabilities Act in 1990.

== Summary of the Section ==
Section 504 of the Rehabilitation Act of 1973 states (in part):

No otherwise qualified individual with a disability in the United States, as defined in section 705(20) of this title, shall, solely by reason of her or his disability, be excluded from the participation in, be denied the benefits of, or be subjected to discrimination under any program or activity receiving federal financial assistance or under any program or activity conducted by any Executive agency or by the United States Postal Service.

It is Pub. L. No. 93-112, 87 Stat. 394 (Sept. 26, 1973), codified at 29 U.S.C. § 794 et seq.

As amended in 1974, Section 111, Pub L. 93-516, 88 Stat. 1619 (Dec. 7, 1974), Individuals with Disabilities are:

Any person who (a) has a physical or mental impairment which substantially limits one or more of such person's major life activities, (b) has a record of such an impairment, or (c) is regarded as having such an impairment

where

Major life activities include caring for one's self, walking, seeing, hearing, speaking, breathing, working, performing manual tasks, and learning.

In October 2026, the U.S. Department of Health and Human Services issued a final rule (effective in January 2027) that excludes gender dysphoria from the definition of disability in its Section 504 implementation regulations unless the gender dysphoria results from a physical impairment.

However, "For purposes of employment," Qualified Individuals with Disabilities must also meet "normal and essential eligibility requirements", such that:

For purposes of employment, Qualified Individuals with Disabilities are persons who, with Reasonable Accommodation, can perform the essential functions of the job for which they have applied or have been hired to perform.

where

Reasonable Accommodation means an employer is required to take reasonable steps to accommodate [one's] disability unless it would cause the employer undue hardship.

That is, Qualified Individuals with Disabilities must be able to perform the job duties associated with the job for which they would be hired. The United States Department of Labor also indicates that "Small Providers" do not have to make "significant structural alterations to their existing facilities" to accommodate individuals with disabilities.

The ADA Americans with Disabilities Act of 1990 seems to pick up where the Rehabilitation Act left off. Borrowing from the §504 definition of disabled person, and using the familiar three-pronged approach to eligibility (has a physical or mental impairment, a record of an impairment, or is regarded as having an impairment), the ADA applied those standards to most private sector businesses, and sought to eliminate barriers to disabled access in buildings, transportation, and communication. To a large degree, the passage of the ADA supplants the employment provisions of §504, reinforces the accessibility requirements of §504 with more specific regulations".

== Implications ==
Section 504 covers "any program or activity receiving federal financial assistance." If an organization receives federal support of any kind, even if the organization is not a federal or state organization, the organization must comply with Section 504. For example, airports in the United States can be at least partially funded by grants from federal and state governments; thus, they must comply. In many communities, public libraries receive federal financial assistance directly or indirectly, so they must comply as well. Airports and public libraries became accessible according to the Section 504 stipulation within a few years of the implementation of Section 504.

== Requirements for educational programs ==
=== K–12 schools ===
The law also pertains to any "local educational agency (as defined in section 8801 of Title 20), system of vocational education, or other school system". As applied to K–12 schools, "the language broadly prohibits the denial of public education participation, or enjoyment of the benefits offered by public school programs because of a child's disability." Although the Individuals with Disabilities Education Act (IDEA) also applies to K-12 schools, the existence of IDEA does not mean the Rehabilitation Act is superfluous. IDEA only protects a subset of children and youth who have disabilities—those who satisfy its definition for "child with a disability", which is limited to thirteen types of disabilities and would qualify for an Individualized Education Program. The definition of disability under Section 504 is broader than that of the Individuals with Disabilities Education Act, so some children who do not meet the IDEA definition of disability can still be served under Section 504.

Section 504 requires school districts to provide appropriate accommodations to access Free Appropriate Public Education (FAPE) for children with disabilities who may benefit from public education within the individual district's jurisdiction. Regardless of the child's disability, the school district must identify the child's educational needs and provide accommodations for students to access their education.

Section 504 supports students' rights for needs outside of the school day, such as extracurricular activities, sports, and after-school care, because Section 504 prohibits discrimination on the basis of disability. While the process for accommodating students varies per institution, schools generally comply with Section 504 by identifying students with disabilities and evaluating those students. If the students are eligible, they create a written accommodation plan, often called a "504 Plan," which outlines accommodations for a student with a disability.

Violations of Section 504 in the educational environment can be addressed locally with the education agency or with the Office for Civil Rights (OCR) of the U.S. Department of Education. Violations of Section 504 can result in a loss of the federal funding. According to the Department, individuals may also file a private right of action for violations of Section 504. Thus, Section 504 is enforced by OCR. IDEA is carried out by another unit of the department, the Office of Special Education Programs (OSEP).

=== Extracurricular activity ===
Section 504 covers extracurricular and after school programs such as sports, music lessons, and afterschool care. 34 C.F.R. § 104.37.

The Department of Education Office of Civil Rights has determined that Section 504 applies to:

- Playgrounds: Hazleton (Pennsylvania) Area School District, 17 EHLR 907 (OCR, March 7, 1991); San Francisco (California) Unified Sch. Dist., 23 IDELR 1200 (OCR, November 26, 1995); Mill Valley (CA) Elementary Sch. Dist., 23 IDELR 1190 (OCR, October 10, 1995);
- Band programs: Akron (Ohio) City Sch., 19 IDELR 793 (OCR, January 15, 1993);
- Special programs and assemblies: Whitman-Hanson (Massachusetts) Regional Sch. Dist., 20 IDELR 775 (OCR, August 19, 1993); Atlanta (Georgia) Pub. Sch., 16 EHLR 19 (OCR, January 9, 1989)
- Field trips and off-site programs: Ontario-MontClair (California) Unified Sch. Dist., 24 IDELR 780 (OCR, February 7, 1996); Elk Grove (California) Unified Sch. Dist., 21 IDELR 941 (OCR, August 1, 1994)
- Clubs: Colquitt County (Georgia) Sch. Dist., 25 IDELR 244 (OCR, June 6, 1996); South Central (Indiana) Area Special Educ. Coop., 17 EHLR 248 (September 25, 1990);
- Afterschool and summer programs: Clayton (Missouri) Sch. Dist., 16 EHLR 766 (OCR, March 16, 1990); Conejo Valley (California) Unified Sch. Dist., 23 IDELR 448 (OCR, June 28, 1995);
- Graduation: Aldine (Texas) Indep. Sch. Dist., 16 EHLR 1411 (OCR, July 12, 1990); and
- Late bus transportation: Carmel Cent. (New York) Sch. Dist., 20 IDELR 1177 (OCR, September 30, 1993).

=== Higher education ===
The intention of Section 504 was to impact employment of people with disabilities, thereby including education. Section 504 was the first national civil rights legislation that provided equal access for students with disabilities to higher education institutions receiving federal financial assistance. Both public and private colleges and universities supported by federal grants and funding programs must comply with Section 504. The common way higher education institutions are linked to federal funds is through the federal student aid programs. Initially, colleges, universities, and community colleges complied with the regulations imposed by Section 504 in the late-1970s and early to mid-1980s.

Higher education institutions are required to make their programs accessible to qualified students with disabilities. Qualified students with disabilities are determined by the admissions criteria of the individual higher education institution. Students wishing to receive accommodations must initiate the process, which varies per higher education institution. This process largely subscribes to the medical model of disability, as many higher education institutions require medical documentation of diagnosis and functioning regarding the disability during the accommodation application process. These colleges and universities are required to make reasonable accommodations for students with disabilities who attend their institutions.

== Rights under Section 504 ==
Although not in the text of the statute, courts have held that individuals have a private right of action under Section 504. While punitive damages are not available, compensatory damages are available to plaintiffs. Arguably, these rights extend to include emotional distress damages.

In addition to its responsibility for enforcing other federal statutes prohibiting discrimination in housing, the U.S. Department of Housing and Urban Development (HUD) has a statutory responsibility under Section 504 to ensure that individuals are not subjected to discrimination on the basis of disability by any program or activity receiving HUD assistance. Section 504 charges HUD's Office of Fair Housing and Equal Opportunity with enforcing the right of individuals to live in federally subsidized housing free from discrimination on the basis of disability. Further, Section 504 covers employment discrimination based on disability and requires HUD and HUD-assisted agencies to make reasonable accommodations for the known physical or mental limitations of an employee or qualified applicant. It covers all HUD programs except for its mortgage insurance and loan guarantee programs.

Any housing that receives federal assistance, such as Section 8 public housing, is subject to Section 504 regulations and requirements. Any person with a disability who believes that have been discriminated against in a HUD-funded program or activity may file a complaint with HUD under Section 504. A complaint can be filed with HUD's Office of Fair Housing and Equal Opportunity. If a person with disabilities feels subject to discrimination in a housing situation that does not receive federal assistance, they can also file a complaint, under the Americans with Disabilities Act and Title VIII of the Civil Rights Act.

== History ==
The early history of federal legislation benefiting people with disabilities includes the Civilian Vocational Rehabilitation Act of 1920 (Smith-Fess Act) passed after World War I. It is one of the first U.S. laws that provided services for all Americans with disabilities, not just veterans with disabilities. Over the years, subsequent laws and amendments included additional vocational rehabilitation measures.

Section 504 brought the language of the Civil Rights Act of 1964 to the Rehabilitation Act of 1973. As a law that fell within the office of Health, Education, and Welfare, this was an unlikely place for a social justice provision, yet inserting such a rights clause happened without fanfare. Working behind the scenes on what most believed was a bill related to budget, a staffer added the thirty-five words that addressed issues of discrimination related to disability. This was a departure from prevailing views at the time that considered disability to be purely a medical condition. The law prohibited any entity receiving federal funding (such as government offices, schools, universities, hospitals, airports, train stations and post offices) from discriminating against someone because of a disability.

Concerned about costs and enforcement, the Nixon and Ford Administrations attempted to stall the regulations both by rewriting them and calling for further study regarding their impact if they did stay in their present form. Institutions such as universities and hospitals hoped to avoid bad publicity and huge expenses by waiting out the regulation process. As well, early versions of the Rehabilitation Act of 1973 were vetoed by Nixon in October 1972 and March 1973. In 1972, Disabled in Action demonstrated in New York City with a sit-in protesting one of the vetoes. Led by Judith E. Heumann, eighty activists staged this sit-in on Madison Avenue, stopping traffic. In 1972, demonstrations were also held by disabled activists in Washington, D.C. to protest this veto; among the demonstrators were Disabled in Action, Paralyzed Veterans of America, the National Paraplegia Foundation, and others.

Disability rights groups, especially the American Coalition of Citizens with Disabilities (ACCD), advocated to keep the regulations of Section 504 of the Rehabilitation Act in place unchanged. Section 504 required another step before being implemented (and thus enforced), a signature from the Secretary of Health, Education, and Welfare (HEW). In 1975, a federal lawsuit was filed to force the agency to act. In July 1976, a federal district for Washington DC ruled that the regulations should be issued "with no further unreasonable delays." As the arrival of a new president drew near, HEW Secretary under departing President Gerald Ford, David Matthews, left them unsigned.

During his campaign, Jimmy Carter promised to change this if he was elected president. When he took office in January 1977, he too grew concerned about costs and invited Joseph Califano, the new HEW head, to study the legislation and its implications by establishing a task force that did not include representation from ACCD or anyone with a disability. Word leaked out that the 504 regulations that insisted on full integration of people with disabilities were being changed into something more akin to "separate but equal." ACCD members tried to reach President Carter, who had promised to support disability rights during a campaign speech in Warm Springs, Georgia, a significant location because it had been President FDR's wheelchair-accessible "home away from home" while he was in the White House. Carter insisted that the matter fell to Califano.

=== Protests and outcome ===
After Joseph Califano's resistance to signing the regulations, national protests were organized, which are now known as the 504 Sit-in. Due to the pressure of the protests, Joseph Califano signed the regulations unchanged on April 28, 1977. In San Francisco, the occupation would last another two days, until April 30, 1977, to give the occupiers time to clean up and to allow their fellow protesters time to return from Washington so they could all leave the building together with raised fists in triumph. Some also seemed reluctant to leave the disability city, the "mini-Woodstock" they had created. The 504 Sit-in lasted a total of 25 days and remains the longest nonviolent occupation of a federal building in U.S. history.

Protesters held a large victory rally in Civic Center Plaza where occupiers sang "We Have Overcome," then toasted with champagne and gave victory speeches. Organizer Kitty Cone captured the mood and the accomplishment by saying: "We showed strength and power and courage and commitment, that we the shut-ins or the shut-outs, that we the hidden, supposedly the frail and the weak, that we could wage a struggle at the highest level of government and win!"

The protest is considered "perhaps the single most impressive act of civil disobedience in the United States over the last quarter-century." The success ensured that disability rights would be understood to be a civil right, that disabled people could claim an identity alongside those of racial, ethnic, and gender identities. It has been described as the Stonewall of the Disability Rights Movement because it solidified the American struggle for disability rights. The successful action showed people with disabilities to be capable of grassroots action and ongoing public protest for the first time in history. It brought together people with different disabilities to forge coalitions that would work together to draft and pass the 1990s Americans with Disabilities Act (ADA).

The protests also led Califano to sign the regulations for the 1975 Education for All Handicapped Children Act, another law awaiting a signature from the head of HEW after Congress had passed it. Along with provisions from 504, this law paved the way for bringing children with disabilities into the educational mainstream, giving them access to better schooling and opportunities.

Over the next several years, Section 504 was controversial because it afforded people with disabilities many rights similar to those for other minority groups in the Civil Rights Act of 1964. Throughout the Reagan administration, efforts were made to weaken Section 504. Patrisha Wright and Evan Kemp, Jr. (of the Disability Rights Center) led a grassroots and lobbying campaign against this, which generated more than 40,000 cards and letters. In 1984, the administration dropped its attempts to weaken Section 504; however, they did end the Social Security benefits of hundreds of thousands of disabled recipients. Section 504 also provoked some resistance and backlash from organizations that complained of costs.

==== 504 trainings ====
As part of the 504 victory, the federal government funded disability activists to travel across the United States to explain to people with disabilities and local officials the rights guaranteed by the law. This helped spread the disability rights movement beyond the San Francisco Bay Area.

==== Section 504 and the Americans with Disabilities Act (ADA) ====
The 504 occupation created a generation of disability rights activists and advocates who would go on to draft the Americans with Disabilities Act (ADA) of 1990. The ADA can be viewed as picking up where 504 left off, handling the more difficult, complex situations. Using Section 504 as a template, the framers of the ADA sought to extend provisions that now applied to government to much of the private sector (notably private employers, stores, hotels, and restaurants). The new law also specifically stated that the ADA would not amend or weaken Section 504. Because it was drafted based on Section 504, the ADA also framed disability in the context of civil rights rather than as a medical need, using terms such as "discrimination," "reasonable accommodation," and "otherwise qualified." The cross-disability coalitions forged during the 504 protests also ensured that the ADA would employ a broad definition of disability so that it could encompass a wide variety of impairment groups. Like Section 504, the ADA includes people with psychiatric disabilities, alcoholics, and recovered drug addicts (though current drug users are excluded).

Activists formed by the 504 occupation such as Patrisha Wright spent the next thirteen years building relationships in Washington that would help pave the way for passing the ADA.

With thirteen years of Section 504 on the books, framers of the ADA could point to evidence that the earlier law had not led to the massive economic collapse that some had predicted.

Developments in Section 504 and the ADA

The ADA Amendments Act, passed in 2008, significantly broadened the scope of persons included in the protected class of "person with a disability," overturning more restrictive precedents. Congress explicitly intended to expand the definition of disability when passing the law, choosing to focus on whether "entities covered under the ADA" were successfully performing their duties in a way that did not focus on excluding people from protection.

== See also ==
- Fair Housing Act
- Air Carrier Access Act
- Individual Family Service Plan
- Individualized Education Program

== Notes ==
=== Additional references ===
- Scotch, Richard, K. "From Good Will to Civil Rights: Transforming Federal Disability Policy". Temple University Press, 2001.
- Switzer, Jacqueline Vaughn. Disabled Rights: American Disability Policy and the Fight for Equality. Georgetown University Press, 2003.
- OCR Senior Staff Memoranda, "Guidance on the Application of Section 504 to Noneducational Programs of Recipients of Federal Financial Assistance," January 3, 1990.
- Lynch, William, "The Application of Title III of the Americans with Disabilities Act to the Internet: Poor E-Planning Prevents Poor E-Performance," 12 CommLaw Conspectus: Journal of Communications Law and Policy 245 (2004).
