= Judith Heumann =

American disability activist (1947–2023)

Judy Heumann
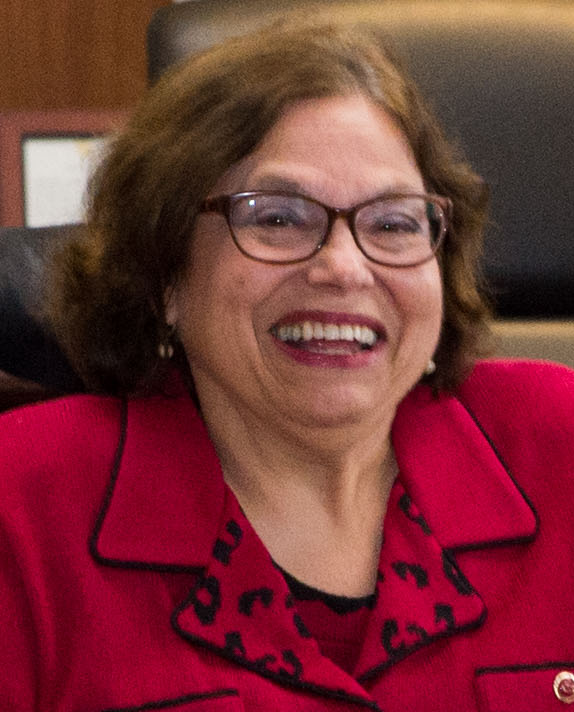
- Heumann in 2014

Special Advisor for International Disability Rights
- In office June 7, 2010 – January 20, 2017
- President: Barack Obama
- Preceded by: Position established
- Succeeded by: Sara Minkara (2021)

Assistant Secretary of Education for Special Education and Rehabilitative Services
- In office June 1993 – January 20, 2001
- President: Bill Clinton
- Preceded by: Robert Davila
- Succeeded by: Robert Pasternack

Personal details
- Born: December 18, 1947 Philadelphia, Pennsylvania, U.S.
- Died: March 4, 2023 (aged 75) Washington, D.C., U.S.
- Party: Democratic
- Spouse: Jorge Pineda (m. 1992)
- Education: Long Island University (BS); University of California, Berkeley (MPH)

Judith Ellen Heumann (/ˈhjuːmən/; December 18, 1947 – March 4, 2023) was an American disability rights activist, known as the "Mother of the Disability Rights Movement". She was recognized internationally as a leader in the disability community. Heumann was a lifelong civil rights advocate for people with disabilities. Her work with governments and non-governmental organizations (NGOs), nonprofits, and various other disability interest groups significantly contributed to the development of human rights legislation and policies benefiting children and adults with disabilities. Through her work in the World Bank and the State Department, Heumann led the mainstreaming of disability rights into international development. Her contributions extended the international reach of the independent living movement.

== Early life ==
Heumann was born in Philadelphia, to Werner and Ilse Heumann, who were German Jewish immigrants. She was the oldest of three children and grew up in Brooklyn, New York. Her mother came to the U.S. from Germany in 1935 and her father in 1934. Heumann's grandparents, great-grandparents, and many other family members were killed in the Holocaust. Her brother Joseph Heumann is a film professor and author.

Heumann contracted polio at the age of 18 months, and used a wheelchair most of her life. She rejected cliches about disability as a tragic experience, saying, "Disability only becomes a tragedy for me when society fails to provide the things we need to lead our lives—job opportunities or barrier-free buildings, for example. It is not a tragedy to me that I'm living in a wheelchair."

Heumann and her parents had to fight repeatedly for her to be included in the educational system. The local public school refused to allow her to attend, calling her a fire hazard due to her inability to walk. Instead, for three years she was given home instruction twice a week, for about an hour each visit. Heumann's mother, Ilsa Heumann, a community activist in her own right, challenged the decision. Heumann was then allowed to go to a special school in the fourth grade for disabled children. Per city policy, Heumann was to return to home instruction for high school. Heumann's mother rallied against this policy with other parents who put enough pressure on the school to reverse the policy. Heumann entered high school in 1961.

Heumann attended Camp Jened, a camp for children with disabilities, in Hunter, New York, every summer from ages 9 to 18. Her experiences at camp brought her a greater awareness of the shared disabled experience: "We had the same joy together, the same anger over the way we were treated and the same frustrations at opportunities we didn't have." At Camp Jened, Heumann met Bobbi Linn and Freida Tankus, both of whom she later worked with as disability rights activists. The 2020 Oscar-nominated documentary Crip Camp features Camp Jened campers, including Heumann.

Heumann graduated from Long Island University in 1969. She earned a Master of Science degree in public health at the University of California, Berkeley in 1975.

Heumann began making major moves toward rights for people with disabilities while attending Long Island University. She organized rallies and protests with other students with and without disabilities, demanding access to her classrooms by ramps and the right to live in a dorm. Heumann studied speech therapy.

== Heumann v. Board of Education of the City of New York ==
In 1970, Heumann was denied her New York teaching license because the Board did not believe she could get herself or her students out of the building in case of a fire. She sued the Board of Education for discrimination. A local newspaper ran the headline "You Can Be President, Not Teacher, with Polio". The case settled without a trial and Heumann became the first wheelchair user to teach in New York City, teaching elementary school there for three years.

== Policy work and advocacy ==
=== Disabled in Action ===
Heumann received much mail from disabled people around the country due to press coverage of her suit against the Board of Education. Many wrote about their experiences with discrimination because of their disabilities. Based on the outpouring of support and letters, in 1970, Heumann and several friends founded Disabled in Action (DIA), an organization focused on securing the protection of people with disabilities under civil rights laws through political protest. It was originally called Handicapped in Action, but Heumann disliked that name and lobbied to change it. Early versions of the Rehabilitation Act of 1973 were vetoed by President Richard Nixon in October 1972 and March 1973. In 1972, DIA demonstrated in New York City with a sit-in protesting one of the vetoes. Led by Heumann, 80 activists staged this sit-in on Madison Avenue, stopping traffic.

=== Center for Independent Living ===
Ed Roberts asked Heumann to move to California to work for the Center for Independent Living, where she served as deputy director from 1975 to 1982. She was an early proponent of the Independent Living Movement. Heumann was responsible for the implementation of federal legislation for programs in special education, disability research, vocational rehabilitation, and independent living, serving more than 8 million youth and adults with disabilities.

=== Individuals with Disabilities Education Act ===
While serving as a legislative assistant to the chairperson of the U.S. Senate Committee on Labor and Public Welfare in 1974, Heumann helped develop legislation that became the Individuals with Disabilities Education Act.

=== 504 Sit-in ===
In 1977, U.S. Secretary of Health, Education and Welfare Joseph Califano refused to sign meaningful regulations for Section 504 of the Rehabilitation Act of 1973, the first U.S. federal civil rights protection for people with disabilities. To force out protesters, he issued orders that no meals or medication be allowed in the HEW federal building. The protesters then contacted Delancey Street Foundation and The Salvation Army, which agreed to bring them food for the next day. Fellow protester Kitty Cone developed a way to keep medication cool by taping a box over the air conditioner unit to store the medication of the disabled protesters. The protesters were also assisted by the Black Panther Party after it received a call from Brad Lomax, a disabled protester with multiple sclerosis and member of the party. Lomax called the Black Panthers to support the protesters with meals, and the Black Panthers brought them hot meals and snacks for the duration of the sit-in. After an ultimatum and deadline, demonstrations took place in ten U.S. cities on April 5, 1977, including the beginning of the 504 Sit-in at the San Francisco office of the U.S. Department of Health, Education and Welfare. This sit-in, led by Heumann and organized by Cone, lasted 28 days, until May 4, 1977, with about 125 to 150 people refusing to leave. It is the longest sit-in at a federal building, as of 2021. Califano signed both the Education of All Handicapped Children regulations and the Section 504 regulations on April 28, 1977.

=== World Institute on Disability ===
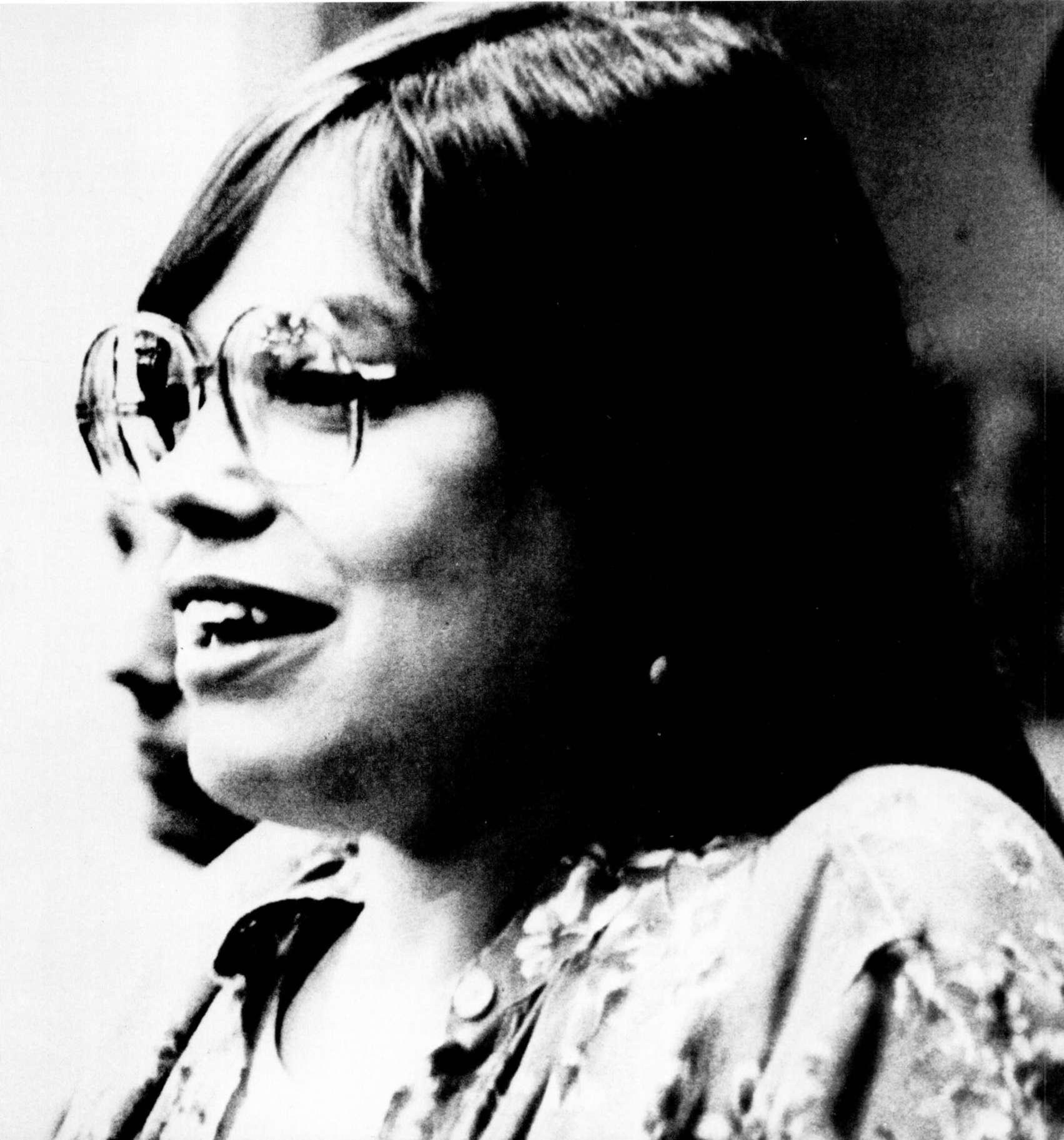
Heumann at a conference in 1981

Heumann co-founded the World Institute on Disability with Ed Roberts and Joan Leon in 1983, serving as co-director until 1993.

=== Department on Disability Services ===
Washington, D.C. mayor Adrian Fenty appointed Heumann as the city's first Director for the Department on Disability Services, where she was responsible for the Developmental Disability Administration and the Rehabilitation Services Administration.

=== Clinton Administration ===
Heumann served in the Clinton Administration as Assistant Secretary of the Office of Special Education and Rehabilitation Services at the United States Department of Education from 1993 to 2001.

=== World Bank ===
From 2002 to 2006, Heumann served as the World Bank Group's first Advisor on Disability and Development, leading the World Bank's work on disability and worked to expand the Bank's knowledge and capability to work with governments and civil society on including disability in the Bank discussions with client countries, its country-based analytical work, and support for improving policies, programs, and projects that allow disabled people around the world to live and work in the economic and social mainstream of their communities. She was Lead Consultant to the Global Partnership for Disability and Development.

=== Special Advisor ===
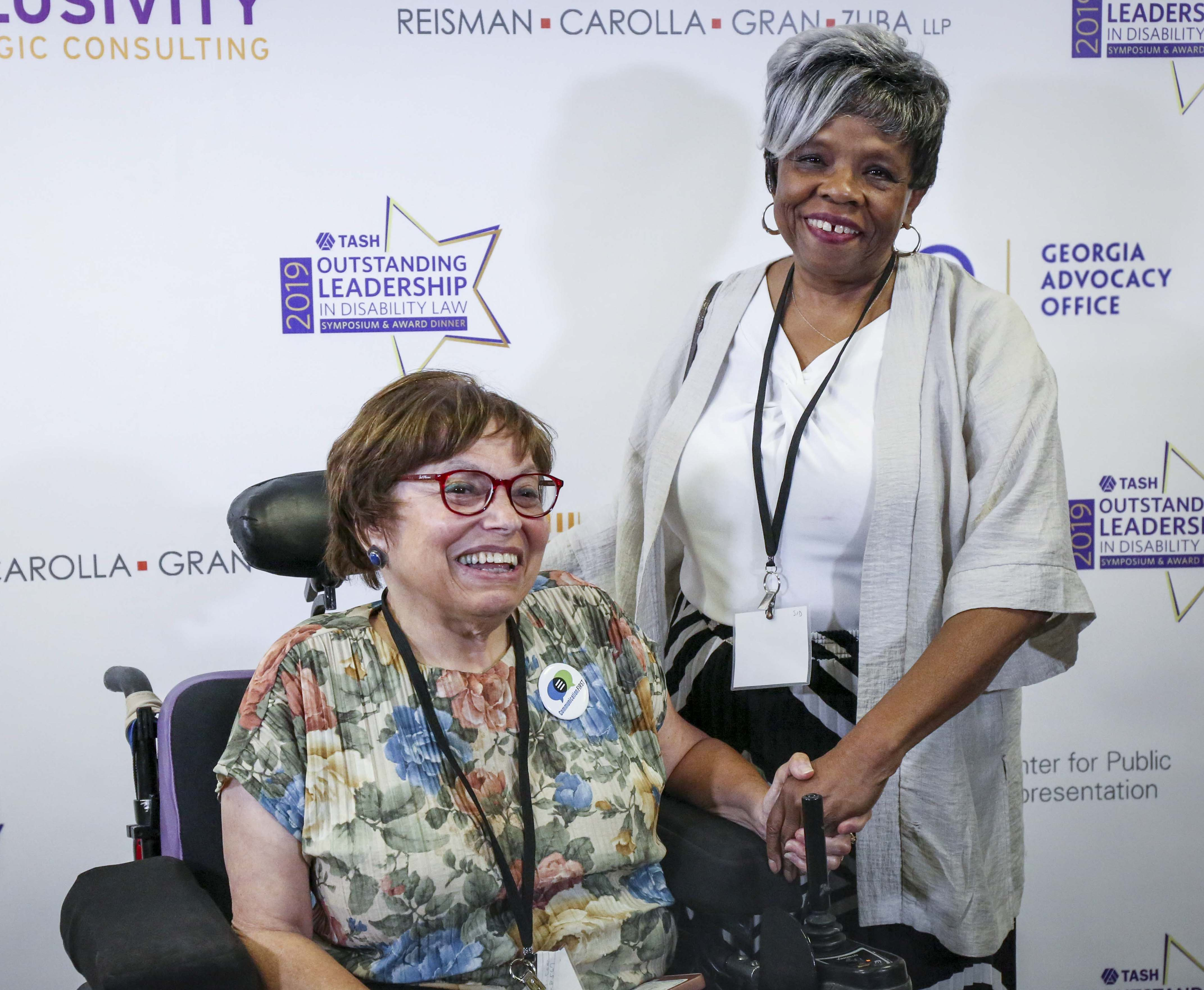
Heumann and Barbara Ransom at TASH's Outstanding Leadership in Disability Law Symposium and Awards Dinner, George Washington University, July 25, 2019

In 2010, Heumann became the Special Advisor on International Disability Rights for the U.S. State Department appointed by President Barack Obama. She was the first person to hold this role, and served from 2010 to 2017. During her tenure, she tried unsuccessfully to persuade the Senate to ratify the United Nations Convention on the Rights of Persons with Disabilities, an international treaty modeled on the Americans with Disabilities Act.

On January 20, 2017, Heumann left her post at the State Department with the arrival of a new administration. United States Secretary of State Rex Tillerson disestablished the Special Advisor role in 2017. The Biden administration reestablished it.

=== Ford Foundation ===
From September 2017 to April 2019, Heumann was a Senior Fellow at the Ford Foundation. There, she worked to help advance the inclusion of disability in the foundation's work. She also promoted the intentional inclusion of disability in philanthropy work. Heumann, Katherine Salinas, and Michellie Hess co-wrote a paper, "Roadmap for Inclusion: Changing the Face of Disability in Media", that explores the lack of representation of disabled people in front of and behind the camera, as well as prominent stereotypes of disabled characters in the media, and concludes with a call to action to increase disabled representation in media.

=== Author ===
Heumann's book, Being Heumann: An Unrepentant Memoir of a Disability Rights Activist, was published in 2020.

=== Podcast ===
In March 2021, Heumann began producing a biweekly podcast, The Heumann Perspective, where she spoke with disabled change-makers and their allies. The podcast featured opening music by Lachi, and featured guests such as filmmaker James LeBrecht, activists Ly Xīnzhèn M. Zhǎngsūn Brown and Leroy F. Moore Jr., model Jillian Mercado, creator Spencer West and many others.

== Personal life and death ==
Heumann married Jorge Pineda in 1992. They lived in Washington, D.C. She died there on March 4, 2023, at age 75.

== Media ==
- The 2008 documentary The Power of 504 prominently features Heumann
- Heumann appears in the 2011 documentary Lives Worth Living.
- Heumann delivered a TEDTalk in 2017.
- Comedy Central made a 2018 episode of Drunk History on the 504 Sit-in, with Heumann played by Ali Stroker
- Heumann appeared on Bloomberg on July 6, 2019, to discuss representation of disability in the media
- Heumann was interviewed by Trevor Noah on The Daily Show in 2020
- Heumann is featured in the 2020 documentary Crip Camp
- Heumann was interviewed by the Urban Institute
- Heumann was interviewed by the Center for Jewish History
- Heumann appeared in the 2024 documentary The Ride Ahead.
- A biopic, Being Heumann, based on Heumann's memoir of the same title, premiered as the opening film of the Toronto International Film Festival on September 10, 2026. Ruth Madeley portrays Heumann.

== Awards and recognition ==
- 2022: Named one of the BBC 100 Women
- 2020: Named Time magazine's 1977 Woman of the Year, in a retrospective in 2020
- 2020: Henry Viscardi Achievement Awards
- 2020: Critics' Choice Documentary Award honor as one of the "Most Compelling Living Subjects of a Documentary", regarding the documentary Crip Camp
- 2019: The Lurie Institute for Disability Policy gave an award "The journey to Achieving Equality: Past, Present, and Future of Disability Activism with gratitude for your leadership and activism in civil rights."
- 2018: Women's Caucus Award given by the National Council on Independent Living
- 2018: Society for Disability Studies President's Award. SDS says of their decision to award Heumann:
  "SDS confers the President's Award for artists and activists who embody the goals of the Society, reiterating our commitment to all kinds of work in disability studies. SDS recognizes Judy Heumann for her five-decade career as a disabled activist who has changed the lives of every single disabled person in the United States and across the globe. Her work has shown the vibrancy and strength of the social model of disability and the power and importance of the disability rights movement's central mantra: 'nothing about us without us.'"
- 2017: U.S. International Council on Disabilities, Dole-Harkin Award
- 2017: InterAction Disability Inclusion Award, in recognition of Heumann's major impact on disability inclusion in international development.
- 2014: The Berkeley Rotary Club gave its annual Rotary Peace Grove Award to Heumann and the late Ed Roberts, another disability rights activist.
- Max Starkloff Lifetime Achievement Award from National Council on Independent Living In recognition of a lifetime of dedicated hard work and leadership to advance the Independent Living and Disability Rights Movements and her commitment to the protection and expansion of the civil and human rights of people with disabilities.
- Champion of Disability Rights Award from the SPAN Parent Advocacy Network. "For lifelong commitment and activism for the human and civil rights of children and adults with disabilities in the United States throughout the world."
- Advocacy Award from ALPHA Disability Section: "This award is presented to a person or a consumer-driven organization who has demonstrated excellence in the area of advocacy to improve the health and quality of life for people with disabilities."
- Heumann was the first recipient of the Henry B. Betts Award from the Rehabilitation Institute of Chicago (later awarded jointly with the American Association of People with Disabilities).

Heumann was awarded seven honorary doctorates, including doctorates from Brooklyn College and New York University.

Political offices
| Preceded by Robert Davila | Assistant Secretary of Education for Special Education and Rehabilitative Services; 1993–2001 | Succeeded by Robert Pasternack |
Diplomatic posts
| New office | Special Advisor for International Disability Rights; 2010–2017 | Vacant Title next held by Sara Minkara; 2021 |
