= Vital Voices =

U.S. nonprofit organization

Vital Voices Global Partnership
- Formation: March 1, 1999; 27 years ago
- Founders: Hillary Rodham Clinton, Madeleine Albright, Melanne Verveer, Theresa Loar, Donna McLarty, Alyse Nelson, Mary Daley Yerrick
- Tax ID no.: 52-2151557
- Legal status: 501(c)(3) nonprofit organization
- Headquarters: 1509 16th Street NW Washington, D.C. 20036
- Location: Washington, D.C.
- Chair: Kate James
- Vice Chair: Gerry Laybourne
- President, Chief Executive Officer: Alyse Nelson
- Revenue: $12,385,050 (2015)
- Expenses: $10,446,819 (2015)
- Employees: 50 (2020)
- Volunteers: 150 (2015)
- Website: www.vitalvoices.org

Vital Voices Global Partnership is an American international, 501(c)(3), non-profit, non-governmental organization that works with women leaders in the areas of economic empowerment, women's political participation, and human rights. The organization is headquartered in Washington, D.C.

== History ==
The nonprofit Vital Voices Global Partnership grew out of the U.S. government's Vital Voices Democracy Initiative. The Vital Voices Democracy Initiative was established in 1997 by First Lady of the United States Hillary Rodham Clinton and U.S. Secretary of State Madeleine Albright, following the United Nations Fourth World Conference on Women in Beijing to promote the advancement of women as a U.S. foreign policy goal. The first Vital Voices Democracy Initiative conference was held in 1997 in Vienna, and hosted by U.S. Ambassador to Austria Swanee Hunt.

The Vital Voices Democracy Initiative led to the creation of Vital Voices Global Partnership as a nonprofit non-governmental organization (NGO) in March 1999.

Former Hillary Clinton aide and chief of staff Melanne Verveer is co-founder of the global partnership and its board chair emeritus. Other co-founders were Alyse Nelson (current President of Vital Voices Global Partnership), Donna McLarty, Mary Yerrick, and Theresa Loar. Loar was the founding President of the Vital Voices Global Partnership and also served as Director of the Vital Voices Democracy Initiative at the U.S. Department of State, the Senior Coordinator for International Women's' Issues at the U.S. Department of State, and Director of the President's Interagency Council on Women.

Besides Clinton, honorary chairs include current and former U.S. Senators Kay Bailey Hutchison and Nancy Kassebaum Baker.

Funding has come from a variety of sources, including individual donations; corporate sponsors such as ExxonMobil, Standard Chartered Bank, and Bank of America; foundations such as the Avon Foundation for Women and Humanity United.

In 2002, Vital Voices was asked by First Lady Laura Bush to drive the effort to supply school uniforms to the many girls returning to school for the first time following the U.S. led overthrow of the Taliban in Afghanistan.

In May 2022, Vital Voices opened its new global headquarters at 1509 16th Street, NW, in Washington, D.C.

== Mission and programs ==
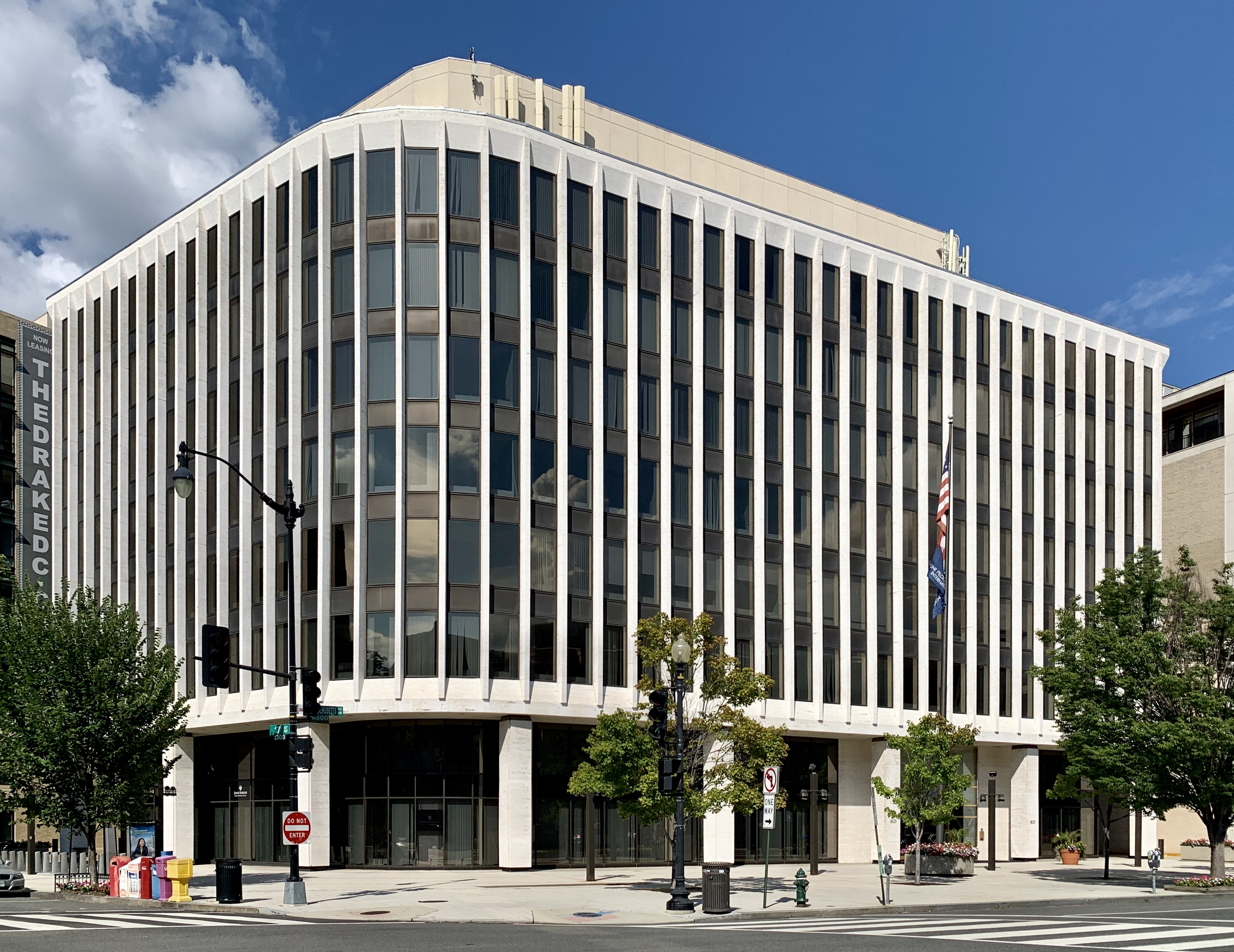
Vital Voices former offices in Washington, D.C.

Vital Voices' website states that its mission is "to identify, invest in, and bring visibility to extraordinary women around the world by unleashing their leadership potential to transform lives and accelerate peace and prosperity in their communities."

Vital Voices works in Africa, Asia, Eurasia, Latin America, the Caribbean, the Middle East, and North Africa, focusing on the business, political, and civil society sectors. The organization regularly hosts international forums, capacity-building workshops, and training seminars for women.

Vital Voices’ Human Rights program currently focuses on combating human trafficking and other forms of violence against women and girls.

== Global Leadership Awards ==
Vital Voices hosts the annual Global Leadership Awards, honoring women leaders working in the areas of human rights, economic empowerment, or political reform. The 2009 ceremony was described as that year's "Most Inspirational Event" in Washington, D.C., in an article in Washington Life Magazine. Its most recent laureates in 2023 include Ava DuVernay, Inna Braverman, Hellen Lunkuse, Sara Minkara, and Enass Muzamel.

== Womenlead India fellowship ==
In 2022, Vital Voices and Reliance Foundation launched the WomenLead India fellowship to support 50 women in India who are working in the areas of women rights and economic empowerment in India.

50 women were selected by the Vital Voices and Reliance Foundation in 2022 for the fellowship including Shridevi Mogilinee, Revathi Radhakrishnan, and Shilpi Singh.

== Solidarity council ==
Male members of the solidarity council include the actor David Schwimmer, athlete Don McPherson, filmmaker Jackson Katz, and Democratic politician Mike Rawlings.

== See also ==
- For Freedoms
- Radio Free Europe/Radio Liberty
- Women, Life, Freedom
- Nicole Joseph-Chin
