= INA =

INA, ina, or Ina may refer to:

== Organizations ==
- National Institute of Arts, Kinshasa (Institut National des Arts), a higher educational institute for performance arts
- Institut national de l'audiovisuel, a repository of all French radio and television audiovisual archives
- Institute of Nautical Archaeology
- Iraqi National Accord, an Iraqi political party
- Iraqi National Alliance, an Iraqi alliance of Shi'a political parties
- Indian National Army, an organisation for Indian independence by Subhas Chandra Bose

== Businesses ==
- INA d.d. (Industrija nafte), Croatia's national oil company
- Indian National Airways, a former airline based out of Delhi, India
- Indonesia Investment Authority, a sovereign wealth fund of Indonesia
- Insurance Company of North America, an American insurance company, now part of ACE Limited
- Istituto Nazionale delle Assicurazioni, an Italian insurance company
- INA, a division of the Schaeffler Group
- Irish Newspaper Archives, an online archive

== Places ==
- Ina, Ibaraki, Japan
- Ina, Nagano, Japan
- Ina, Michigan, an unincorporated community
- Ina, Saitama, Japan
- Ina (river), Poland
- Iňa, Slovakia
- Ina, Illinois, United States
- INA Colony, New Delhi, India
  - Dilli Haat - INA metro station, serving the aforementioned locality
- Ina (crater), a depression on the Moon

== People ==
- Ina (given name)
- Ina (surname)

== Other uses ==
- Indonesia (by IOC country code)
- Immigration and Nationality Act (disambiguation), American laws
- Indian Naval Academy
- Iraqi News Agency, during Saddam regime
- intrinsic Noise Analyzer (iNA), a biochemical software package
- Instrumentation amplifier, a type of differential amplifier
- Ina (goddess), in Polynesian mythology
- Ina (film), a 1982 Indian teen romance
- Ina language, an unclassified language of Brazil
- ina, ISO 639 codes for the Interlingua constructed language

== See also ==
- Inna (disambiguation)
- Aina (disambiguation)
