= Inna (given name) =

- Gender: female

Origin
- Origin: Europe
- Region of origin: Russia

Inna (Инна) is a European given name. It was the name of an early East Orthodox male martyr (see ru:Инна, Пинна и Римма), but is currently used as a feminine name only. In ancient Greece, the name Ἴννα (Inna) is also attested (probably from ἴννην innen, meaning "little girl"), however a connection with the Russian Inna has not been confirmed.

== People named Inna ==
- Inna (born Elena Alexandra Apostoleanu, 1986), Romanian singer
- Inna Bulkina (1963–2021), Ukrainian literary critic, writer and editor
- Inna Braverman, Israeli entrepreneur and businesswoman
- Inna Brayer, amateur ballroom dancer
- Inna Churikova (born 1943), Soviet and Russian actress
- Inna Derusova (1970–2022), Ukrainian military medic
- Inna Dorofeieva (born 1965), Ukrainian ballerina
- Inna Gaponenko (born 1976), Ukrainian chess player
- Inna Gliznuta (born 1973), Moldovan Olympic high jumper
- Inna Lisnyanskaya, Armenian Orthodox and Jewish Russian poet from USSR, later Russia
- Inna Meiman-Kitrossky (1932–1987), refusenik
- Inna Modja (born 1984), Malian-French female singer and model
- Inna Mozhevitina (born 1985), Kazakh biathlete
- Inna Nedelkina (born 2004), Belarusian canoeist
- Inna Osypenko-Radomska (born 1982), Ukrainian/Azerbaijani sprint kayaker
- Inna Palacios (born 1994), Filipino football player
- Inna Poluškina (born 1984), Latvian long-distance runner
- Inna Solovyova (1927–2024), Russian theatre and film critic
- Inna Sovsun (born 1984), Ukrainian professor and politician
- Inna Tumanyan (1929–2005), Soviet-Armenian film director
- Inna Vernikov (born 1984), American politician
- Inna Volyanskaya (1965–2025), Soviet pair skater
- Inna Yaitskaya (born 1979), Russian Olympic swimmer
- Inna Yoffe (born 1988), Israeli Olympic synchronized swimmer
- Inna Zhukova (born 1986), Belarusian Olympic rhythmic gymnast
- Inna Zubkovskaya (1923–2001), Soviet and Russian ballerina
- Inna Shevchenko (born 1990), Ukrainian feminist activist and leader of international women's movement FEMEN

== See also ==
- Inna (disambiguation)
