= Ina (given name) =

Ina is a feminine given name which may refer to:

- Saint Ina, fifth-century Welsh saint
- Ine of Wessex, also spelled Ina, king of Wessex from 688 to 726
- Ina Albowitz (born 1943), German politician
- Ina Ananieva (born 1977), former Bulgarian gymnast and rhythmic gymnastics coach
- Ina Balin (1937–1990), American actress born Ina Rosenberg
- Ina Bandy (1903–1973), humanist photographer
- Ina Bauer (figure skater) (1941–2014), German figure skater
- Ina Benita (1912–1984), Polish actress
- Ina Besche-Krastl (born 1986), German politician
- Ina Blumenthal (born 1981), German politician
- Ina Claire (1893–1985), American actress born Ina Fagan
- Ina Clare (1932–2010), British actress
- Ina Coolbrith (1841–1928), American poet, writer and librarian
- Ina Drew (born c. 1956), former Wall Street executive
- Ina Fried (born Ian Fried in 1974), American journalist and former child actor
- Ina Garten (born 1948), American author
- Ina Jaffe (1948–2024), American journalist
- Ina Jang (born 1982), South Korean photographer
- Ina Justh (born 1969), German rower
- Ina Lange (1846–1930), Finnish pianist, writer and music historian
- Ina Latendorf (born 1971), German politician
- Ina Müller (born 1965), German singer-songwriter, comedian, television host and author
- Ina Nikulina (born 1995), Belarusian rower
- Ninomae Ina'nis, VTuber affiliated with Hololive Production
- Ina Norris, American playwright
- Ina Rama (born 1972), Prosecutor General of the Republic of Albania from 2007 to 2012
- Ina Raymundo (born 1975), Filipina actress, model and singer
- Ina Salter, Apache politician and educator
- Ina Vestal (1903–1983), American politician
- Ina Weisse (born 1968), German actress, screenwriter and film director
- Ina Wroldsen (born 1984), Norwegian singer and songwriter
