= Bulkin =

Bulkin (Russian: Булкин, from булка meaning a loaf of bread, a roll) is a Russian masculine surname, its feminine counterpart being Bulkina. Notable people with the surname include:

- Bert R. Bulkin (1929–2012), American aeronautical engineer
- Inna Bulkina (1963–2021), Ukrainian literary critic, writer and editor
- Kelsey Bulkin (born 1985), singer and musician based in Los Angeles, California
- Nadia Bulkin (born 1987), Indonesian-American political scientist and author
- Oleksandr Bulkin (born 1959), Soviet sports shooter
