= Mons Agnes =

Mountain on the Moon

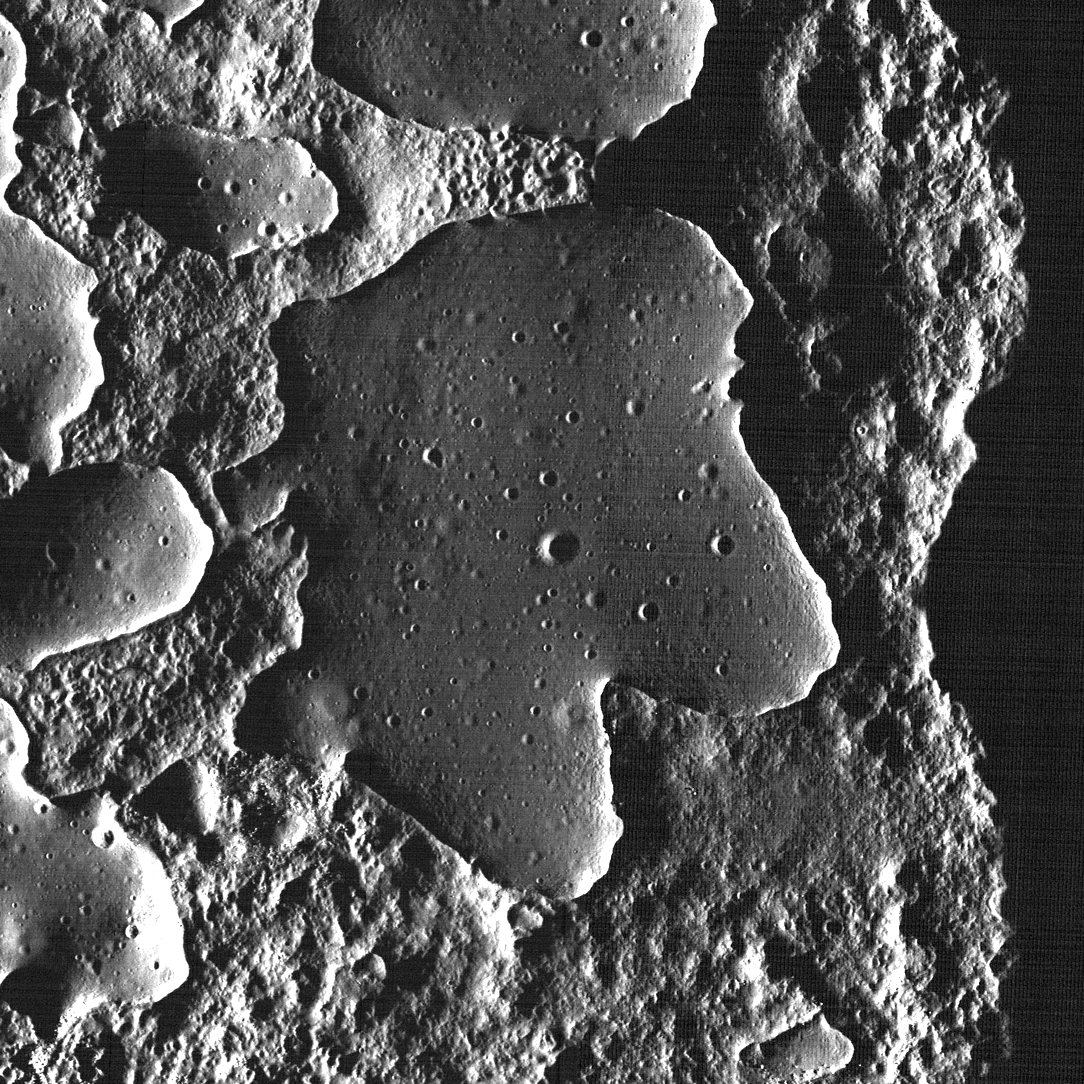
- Mons Agnes. Very low Sun (6.6°) makes the relief well-seen. Width of the photo is 1 km. Image by LRO, 2009.

Highest point
- Elevation: 30 m
- Listing: Lunar mountains
- Coordinates: 18.66°N 5.34°E

Naming
- English translation: Feminine name Agnes
- Language of name: Greek

Geography
- Location: the Moon

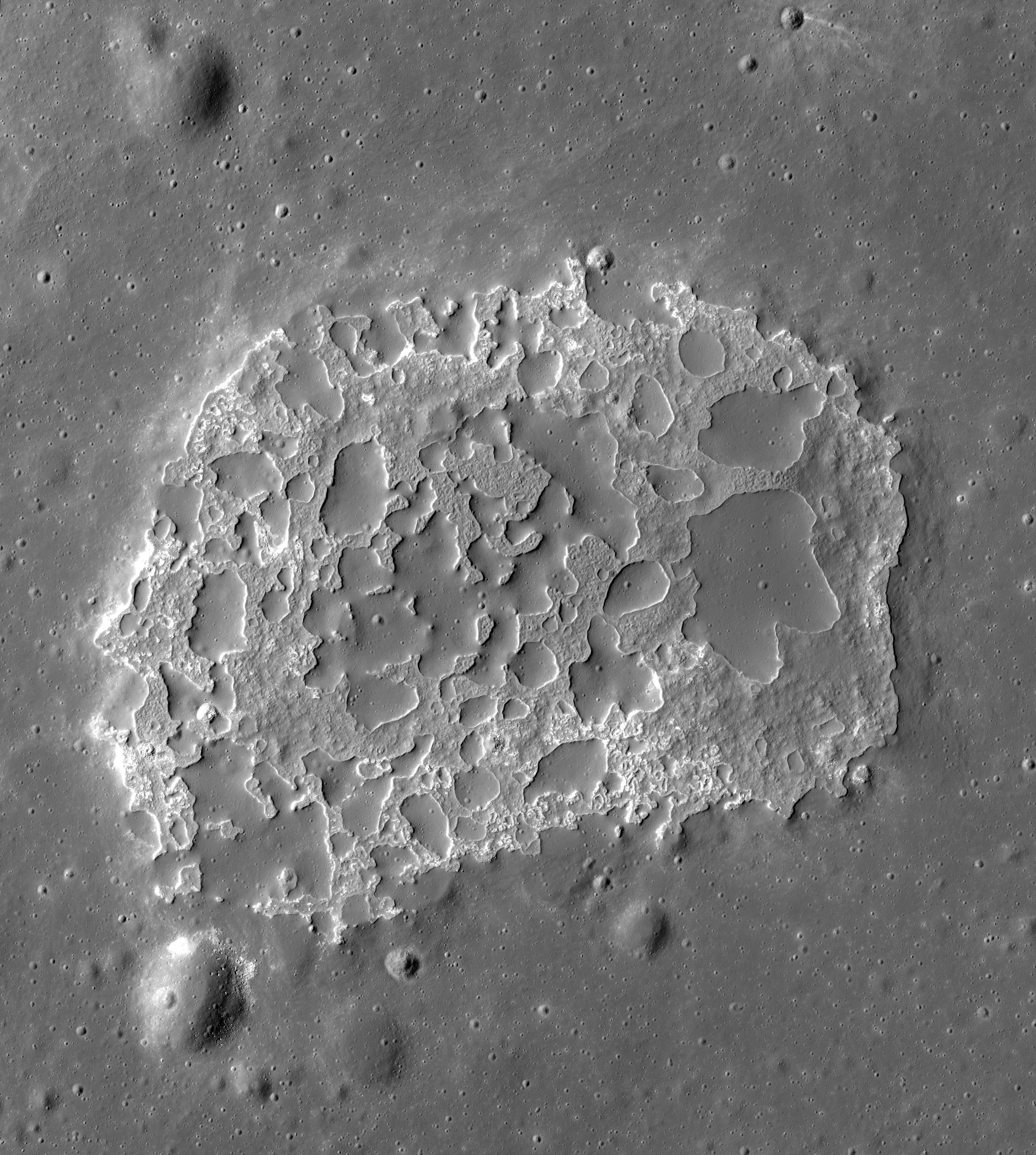
Mons Agnes is the biggest hill in right part of crater Ina

Mons Agnes is a hill ("mountain") on the Moon, in Lacus Felicitatis, inside the crater-like feature Ina, at 18.66°N 5.34°E. It has a maximal width of approximately 650 m (the smallest of all named lunar mountains as of 2014). Its height is more difficult to determine; from Apollo 15 images it was determined as about 30 m, but a newer map, based on LRO photos, gives about 10 m.

Mons Agnes (and the entire Ina crater) was discovered on the photos made by Apollo 15 from lunar orbit in 1971. In 1974 NASA published a topophotomap where its name first appeared: it received Greek feminine name Agnes. In 1979 this name (with a term Mons – "mountain") was adopted by the International Astronomical Union.

Mons Agnes is one of several dozens of similar hills inside Ina (but one of the largest). Their origin, as for Ina on the whole, remains enigmatic.
