= Inna (disambiguation) =

Inna is a Romanian pop singer.

Inna may also refer to:

- Inna (given name)
- Inna (album), an album by Romanian singer Inna
- Inna (Ewa Farna album), an album by Polish-Czech singer Ewa Farna
- Inna (Verdal), a river in Verdal municipality in Trøndelag county, Norway
- 848 Inna, a minor planet in the Solar System
- INNA, meaning "Irish need not apply", a variation of NINA (No Irish need apply)
- Inna (title), a position in the Kingdom of Gobir

== See also ==
- Sisters of inna
- IINA, media player software for macOS
- INA
