= Nicole Joseph =

Nicole Joseph may refer to:

- Nicole Joseph-Chin, American breast care activist
- Nicole M. Joseph, American mathematician
