= Enass Muzamel =

Sudanese human rights activist (1981–2024)

- Born: 1981
- Died: 2024 (aged 42–43)
- Citizenship: Sudan
- Occupation: Human Rights Activist

Enass Muzamel (Arabic: ايناس مزمل; 27 April 1981 – 4 February 2024) was a Sudanese human rights activist and democracy activist. After playing a prominent organising role during the Sudanese revolution, she co-founded Madaniya, a peacebuilding organisation, and served as its director until her death in 2024.

== Early life ==
Muzamel was born and raised in Sudan. Her father died when she was 13, and she and her six sisters were raised by their mother. Muzamel trained as a development practitioner, and for a time volunteered for the United Nations.

== Activism ==
=== Sudanese Female Cyclists Initiative ===
In 2017, Muzamel established the Sudanese Female Cyclists Initiative, which promoted women's participation in outdoor sports, as well as their access to public spaces. In 1991, then-President of Sudan Omar al-Bashir had issued public order laws based on his interpretation of sharia law, which had prohibited women from wearing trousers; in addition, a cultural belief existed that riding bikes would cause women to lose their virginities. Muzamel stated that the al-Bashir regime used its religious credentials to limit criticism, but that most Sudanese people were more moderate and accepting of women riding bikes and taking part in sports, though did report some harassment, primarily from men, during cycles.

The Sudanese Female Cyclists Initiative met weekly at a park in central Khartoum, and by 2018 had over 50 members. Muzamel received practical and financial support from the Sudan Cycling Federation and the Dutch embassy. A woman from the group went on to become Khartoum's first female delivery driver.

=== Sudanese revolution and founding of Madaniya ===
During the Sudanese revolution, Muzamel raised funds, mobilised women, and took part in protests. The revolution ultimately led to the ousting of Omar al-Bashir. Following the revolution, in 2019 she founded Madaniya (Arabic: مدنية, lit. 'civil government'), an organisation co-ordinating civic engagement, grassroots advocacy, and crisis support for women and girls. Through Madaniya, Muzamel often supported rape survivors, including ensuring their access to post-rape care, including through the distribution of rape kits. Support for survivors was often poor due to limited medication and other services across the country, as well as due to abortion being illegal under Sudanese law, leading to women using traditional methods including vaginal douching using herbs. In 2021, Muzamel took part in protests after the coup d'état against Abdalla Hamdok by the Sudanese Armed Forces and the Rapid Support Forces during Sudan's transition to democracy, and publicly called for the army to leave Sudanese politics.

=== War in Sudan ===
Following the outbreak of conflict between the Sudanese Armed Forces and the Rapid Support Forces in April 2023, Muzamel was displaced from her home in Khartoum. She and two of her sisters were subsequently evacuated to Addis Ababa, Ethiopia, with support of the American Friends Service Committee. Muzamel has been critical of the conflict being labelled as a civil war, stating that it was between two factions and had nothing to do with the Sudanese people, who were suffering as a result; she publicly called for a ceasefire and a peace agreement through an inclusive negotiation process. She described both the Sudanese Armed Forces and the Rapid Support Forces of being "terrorists" and accused them of committing crimes against humanity, calling on international governments to place sanctions on both sides and to start a reconstruction campaign in Sudan.

During the war, Muzamel worked to secure health access for survivors of rape, including HIV prevention medications such as PrEP as well as contraception, and means by which to evacuate. After her evacuation from Sudan, Muzamel continued to use social media to establish an informal network including health professionals and other activists, to ensure that what medication and resources were available were reaching survivors. Muzamel stated this was complicated by relief organisations being unable to get aid into the country, as well as many hospitals being either bombed or occupied, and she called on the international community to act in solidarity with the Sudanese people to bring an end to the war and to build a democratic society.

=== Death ===
Following a short illness, Muzamel died in Germany on 4 February 2024.

== Recognition ==
In October 2023, Muzamel received the Vital Voices Global Leadership Award from Hillary Clinton at an event in Washington, D.C. in recognition of her activism.

In December 2023, The Guardian named Muzamel as one of the most inspiring people of 2023.
