= Shilpi Singh =

Indian woman social worker

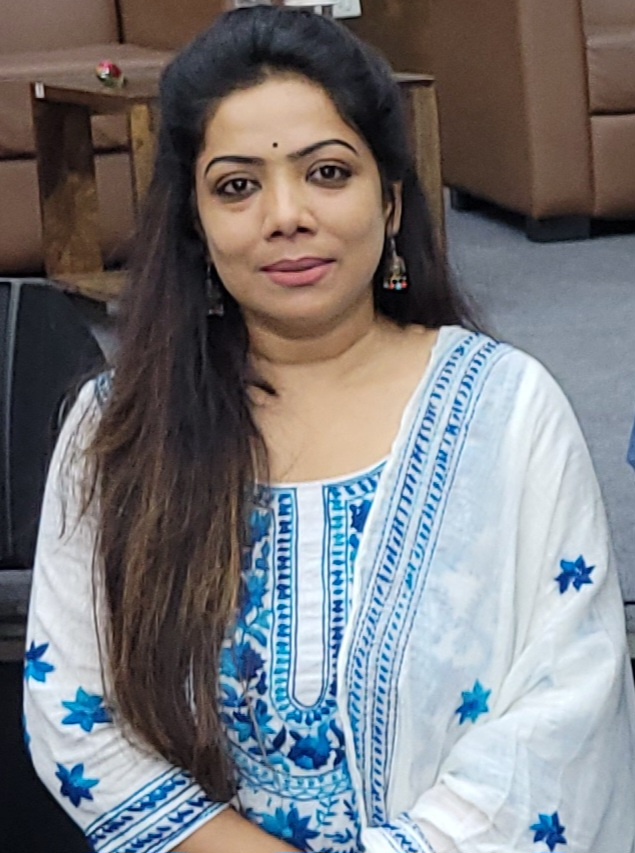
- Born: 20 August 1984 (age 41)
- Occupation: Human Rights Activist
- Organization(s): Bhoomika Vihar, Katihar District, Bihar (India)
- Known for: Social Activism
- Website: https://www.bhoomikavihar.in

Shilpi Singh is an Indian women's rights activist . She helps with the rights and rehabilitation of Indian women in rural areas, to prevent human trafficking, child marriage in Bihar, India.

== Social Work ==
She is the director of Bhoomika Vihar, a not-for-profit organisation.It was established in 1996 with the objective of empowering the marginalised, particularly women and girls at risk of forced or early marriage, with education and skill development, which would expand their socioeconomic opportunities.She rescued around 275 women from trafficking in the Seemanchal region Bihar. and provided support to domestic violence survivors, she acknowledged domestic violence to have a straightforward connection with environment,climate change. Singh participated in advocating for the opening of crisis centers where rescued women could get all assistance in one place that is free from discrimination and has government protection. Through her organization, Bhoomika Vihar, Shilpi signed an MoU with the Canadian Embassy and NSS Bihar to create gender youth speakers to campaign for gender awareness and sensitivity.

Major Initiatives Under Shilpi's leadership:

1. Anti-Human Trafficking Campaigns: These campaigns focus on creating awareness about human trafficking, educating vulnerable communities, and building networks to support rescue operations.
2. Rehabilitation/Reintegration Programs:Bhoomika Vihar facilitates immediate aftercare/reintegration services, including counseling, legal aid, and vocational training, to help survivors rebuild their lives.
3. Education and Empowerment: Recognizing the importance of education, the organization runs educational programs for children and young adults to empower them with knowledge and skills necessary for a better future. Focusing on joyful digital learning and through STEAM module to cope up the learning gap of Urban and Rural students.
4. Joyful Learning Centers & First-Generation Graduates: Bhoomika Vihar has established Maike Centers: Joyful Digital Learning Centers, which have acted as a bridge for children who were once out of school. These centers not only provide education but also serve as a means of empowerment, preventing early marriage and protecting young girls from the dangers of trafficking. Many of these students have gone on to become first-generation graduates, breaking the cycle of marginalization through sustained educational support.
5. Advocacy and Policy Influence: Shilpi Singh actively engages with policymakers and stakeholders to advocate for stronger laws and policies to combat human trafficking and support survivors.

== Durga Jattha ==
To encourage and have participation from local community girls and women, Shilpi initiated forming groups of vulnerable adolescent girls, which is called Durga Jattha. There are 20 girls in a group from the same Panchayat. The girls in the group conduct meetings on regular basis for discussion on vices in the community and they inform to the local government authorities for corrective actions. At present, 50 such groups are active in Araria and Katihar districts of Bihar.

Under this structure of Community Driven and Girl Led Leadership, the group publishes their own handmade newspapers using herbal colours and food grains. The newspaper is shared with Panchayati Raj authorities/ Police and media personnel on regular interval. The group acts against early marriages of girls in rural areas, they also identify and motivate school dropout girls to take part in regular education system.

== Digital Storytelling ==
Shilpi has utilized digital storytelling as a medium to document and highlight the lived experiences of women and girls from marginalized communities, particularly those affected by trafficking, gender-based violence, and social exclusion. Through a series of documentaries such as I Exist, One Night Bride, Lajja, Swaha:Resilience Beyond Borders and Jhatka the organization presents narratives that explore both the challenges and resilience of individuals navigating complex socio-economic realities.

Films like One Night Bride, which has received significant viewership, examine the realities of trafficked brides and forced marriages, while Lajja and Swaha address issues related to stigma and gender-based violence. Other documentaries focus on themes of cyber exploitation, social rehabilitation, and economic empowerment. These projects serve as a resource for raising awareness, fostering discussions, and contributing to broader efforts around gender justice and social change.

== Aanchal: Transforming Lives of Orphaned and Abandoned Children ==
Shilpi Singh has been instrumental in supporting orphaned and abandoned children in rural Bihar through the Aanchal Project, a dedicated initiative focused on providing protection, education, healthcare, and psychosocial support to children at risk due to trafficking, abandonment, social neglect, or exploitation. This initiative prioritizes non-institutional care models, such as Foster care and kinship care, ensuring that children grow up in nurturing family environments rather than institutional settings. The project was launched based on a baseline survey conducted between December 2012 and 2013, which assessed the conditions of orphaned and abandoned children across the state.

Beyond providing immediate relief and protection, the Aanchal Project emphasizes long-term rehabilitation, equipping over 60 children with education, healthcare access, and life skills training since 2013. This approach aligns with international best practices that advocate for family-based care over institutionalization, as outlined in the United Nations Guidelines for the Alternative Care of Children (2010). Through strategic collaboration with local communities, child protection agencies, and legal frameworks, Bhoomika Vihar is working to restore dignity, security, and opportunities to vulnerable children while strengthening child welfare policies.

The project's impact has been widely recognized, particularly in academic discourse. The Rajasthan Sociological Journal (Vol.-16, October 2024) highlighted the Aanchal Project as a transformative model for rehabilitating orphaned and abandoned children in Bihar. The study underscores the effectiveness of Bhoomika Vihar’s community-driven, non-institutional care approach in providing a sustainable and child-centric alternative to institutional care. Furthermore, it illustrates how education and skill development play a crucial role in mitigating the economic and social vulnerabilities of these children, ultimately preparing them for independent and secure futures.

== Emergency Relief ==
Shilpi Singh has led disaster relief efforts in Bihar’s Seemanchal region, responding to natural calamities and public health crises. During the 2008 Kosi floods, she mobilized large-scale relief efforts, providing ration supplies, cooked meals, and medical support to displaced families. During the COVID-19 pandemic, Bhoomika Vihar facilitated vaccination drives, particularly targeting marginalized groups such as Dalits and Musahar communities, ensuring equitable healthcare access.

== Awards ==
- Vital Voices & Reliance Foundation Women Leader (2022-2023) – Recognized for leadership in social activism.
- Secret Superstar Campaign (Aamir Khan Initiative) – Featured for impactful work in grassroots activism.
- International Visitor Leadership Program (IVLP) Delegate (2015) – Selected by the U.S. Embassy for leadership in combating human trafficking.
- HCLTech Grant Finalist (2022-23) – Bhoomika Vihar was recognized in the Education category and featured in "The Fifth Estate VOL.-VII." by HCL Foundation.
