= Gibraltar Wave Farm =

Energy power station in Gibraltar

Coordinates: 36°07′30″N 5°20′26″W

Located on the east side of Gibraltar, on a former World War II ammunition jetty, the Gibraltar Wave Farm is the first commercial, grid-connected wave energy power station in all of Europe. The project utilizes the devices of Eco Wave Power Ltd, an Israel-based wave energy company. The wave farm was initially launched with an estimated peak capacity of 100 kW in April 2016 and plans for expansion to 5 MW within the next years. The project is operating through a 25-year PPA (power purchase agreement) between Eco Wave Power, the Government of Gibraltar, and the Gibraltar Electricity Authority. Upon completion, it is expected generate 15% of the total electricity consumption of Gibraltar. The project is funded, in part, by the 2014-2020 European Regional Development Fund, in order to put the country in line with the EU's renewable energy goal: 20% energy generated from renewable power by 2020. The project is also funded by private investment groups. As of February 2018, the Gibraltar Wave Farm accrued 15,000 grid connected hours (and counting), a new world record for wave energy plant.

== Opening ceremony ==
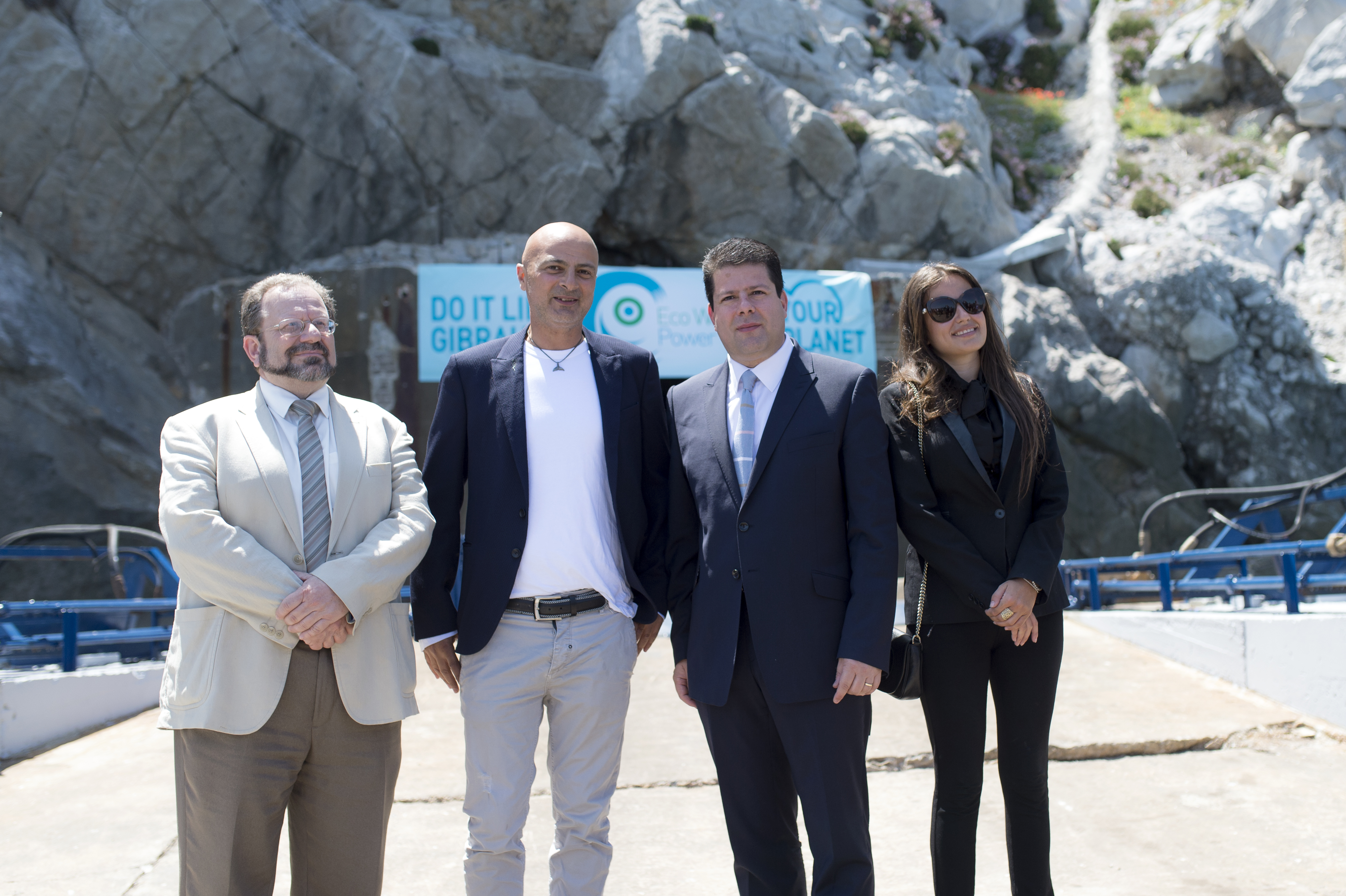
Co-founders David Leb and Inna Braverman stand with Chief Minister Fabian Picardo and Minister for Health, the Environment, and Climate Change John Cortes.

The opening ceremony took place on May 26, 2016.

Chief Minister Fabian Picardo cut the ribbon, and stated to GBC press, "At last we are seeing the grid fed with renewable energy, something that was long overdue ...But it's even more exciting than that. This is the first time, in the whole of Europe, that a renewable wave energy system is linked into an electricity grid. The Gibraltarians are here pioneers in our partnership with Eco Wave Power..."

Minister of Health, The Environment, and Climate Change Dr. John Cortes confirmed the technology, "This is clearly working. I think that the future is bright and the future, like the past all those 6 million years ago, is in the power of the sea all around us."

Gibraltar's Director of European Programmes, Charles Collinson, stated, "...And I hope that we are able to collaborate in future expansion of this project."

== Technical description ==
Converter consists of three main functional parts: mechanical, hydraulic and electric systems. Mechanical system serves for wave energy receipt on floaters and its transmission to hydraulic cylinders. Hydraulic system transforms mechanical energy from the sea to hydraulic fluid pressure and to force of hydraulic motor rotation, which transfers moment of rotation to generator. Generator is part of converter electrical system. It receives moment of rotation and transforms it to electrical power. "

== Gallery ==
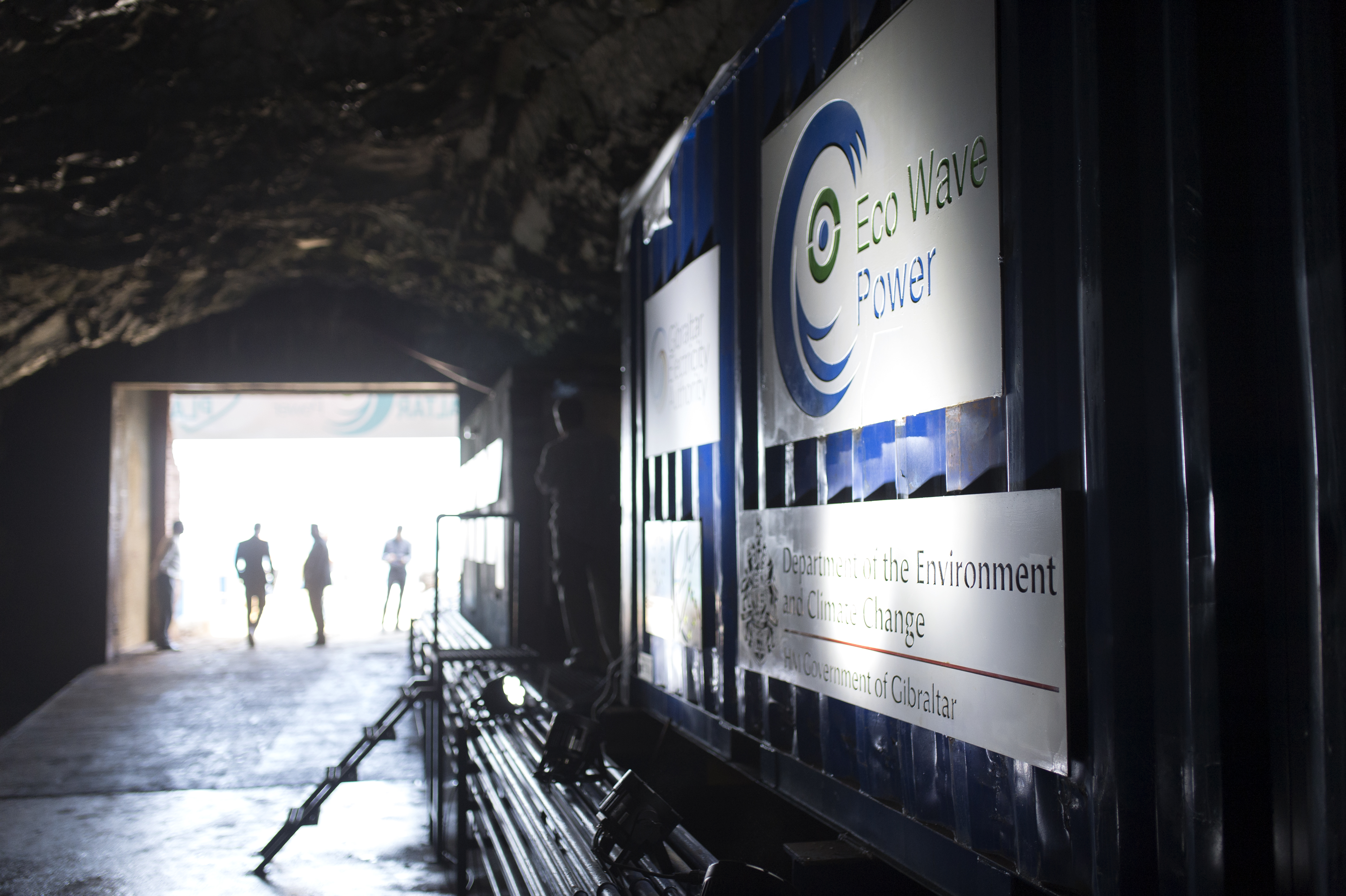
The power station is located inside the prior World War II ammunition jetty tunnels.

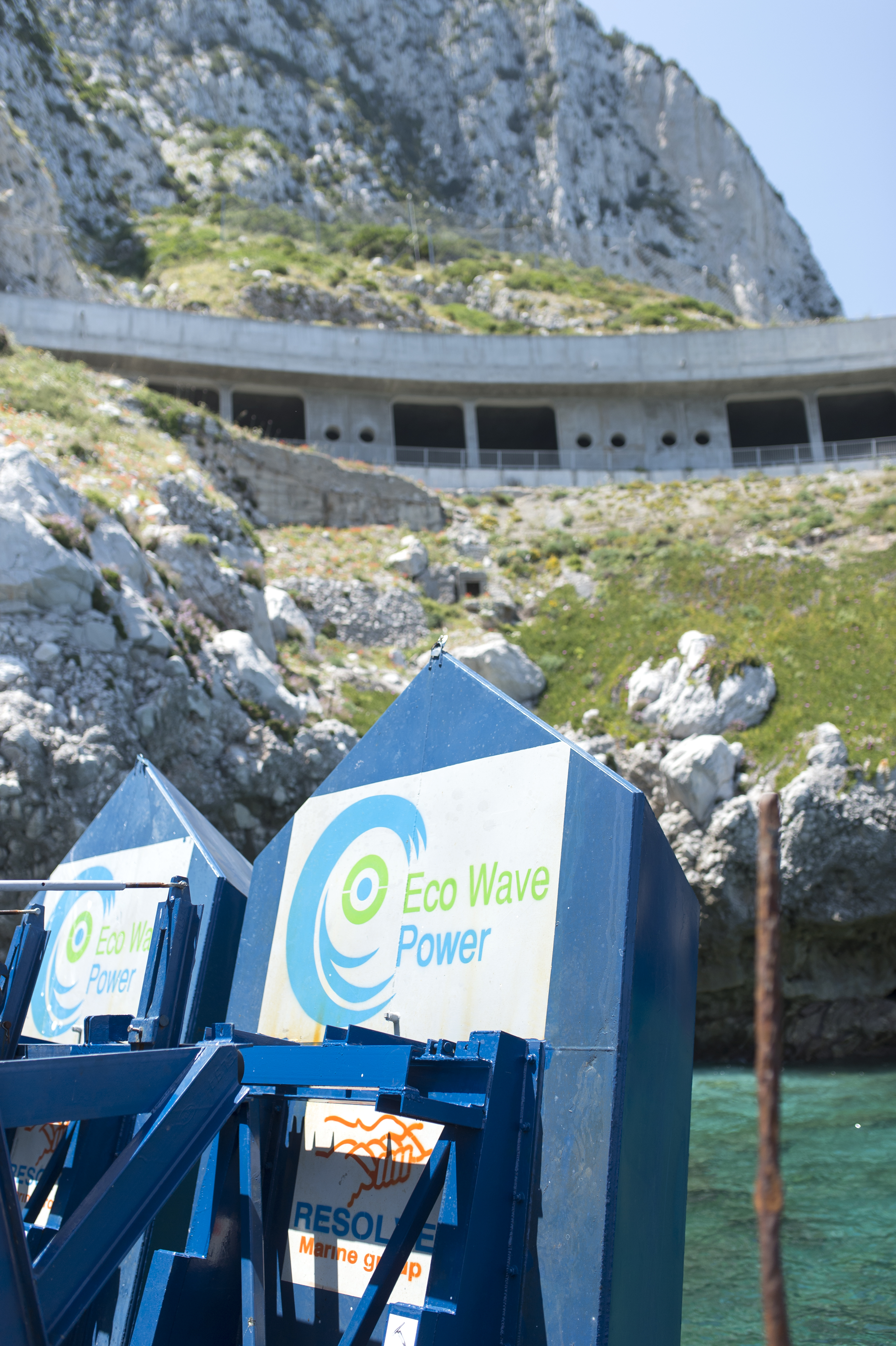
The wave farm is located on the east side of Gibraltar.

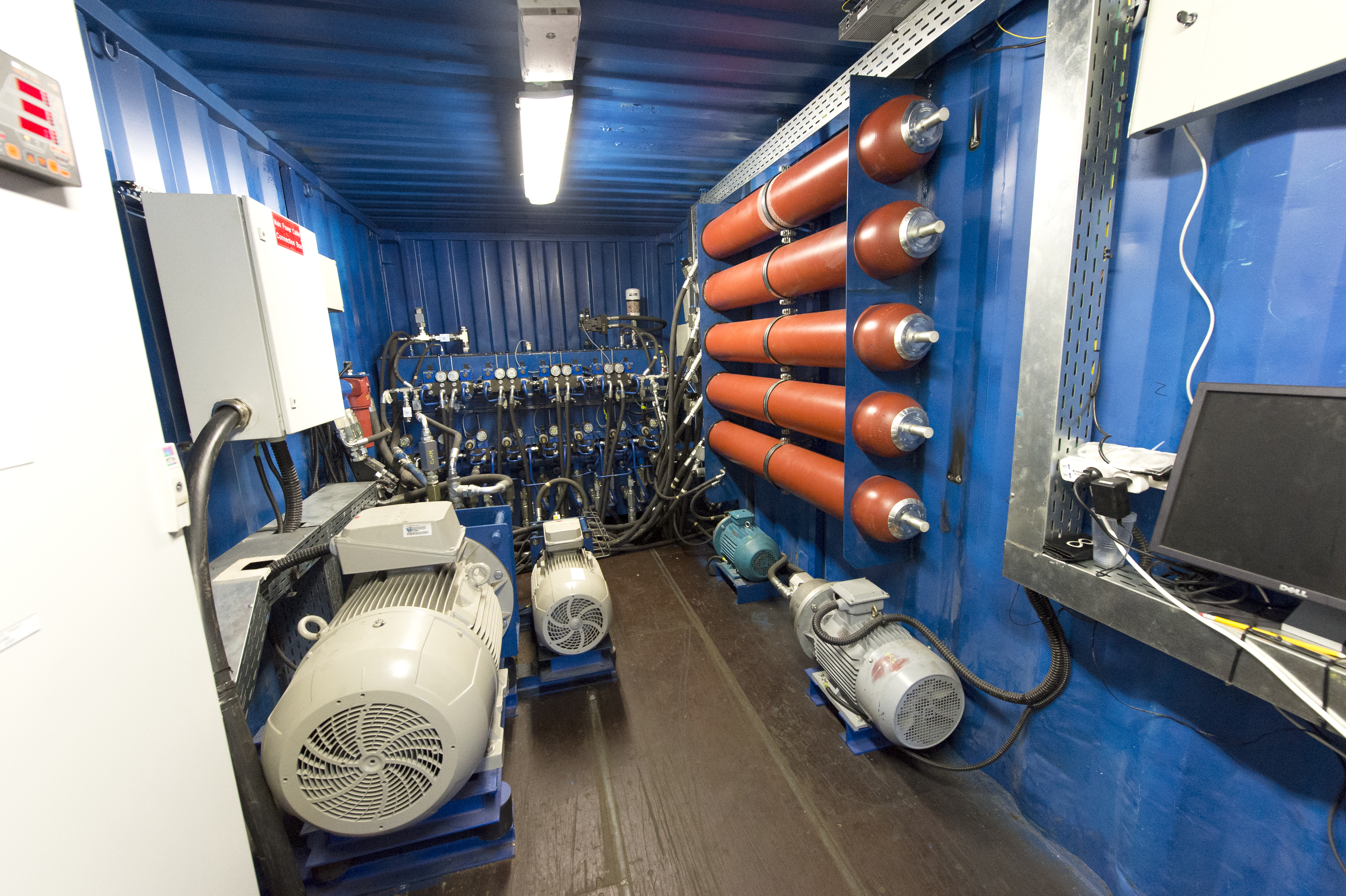
The interior of the 100 KW Gibraltar Wave Farm power station.

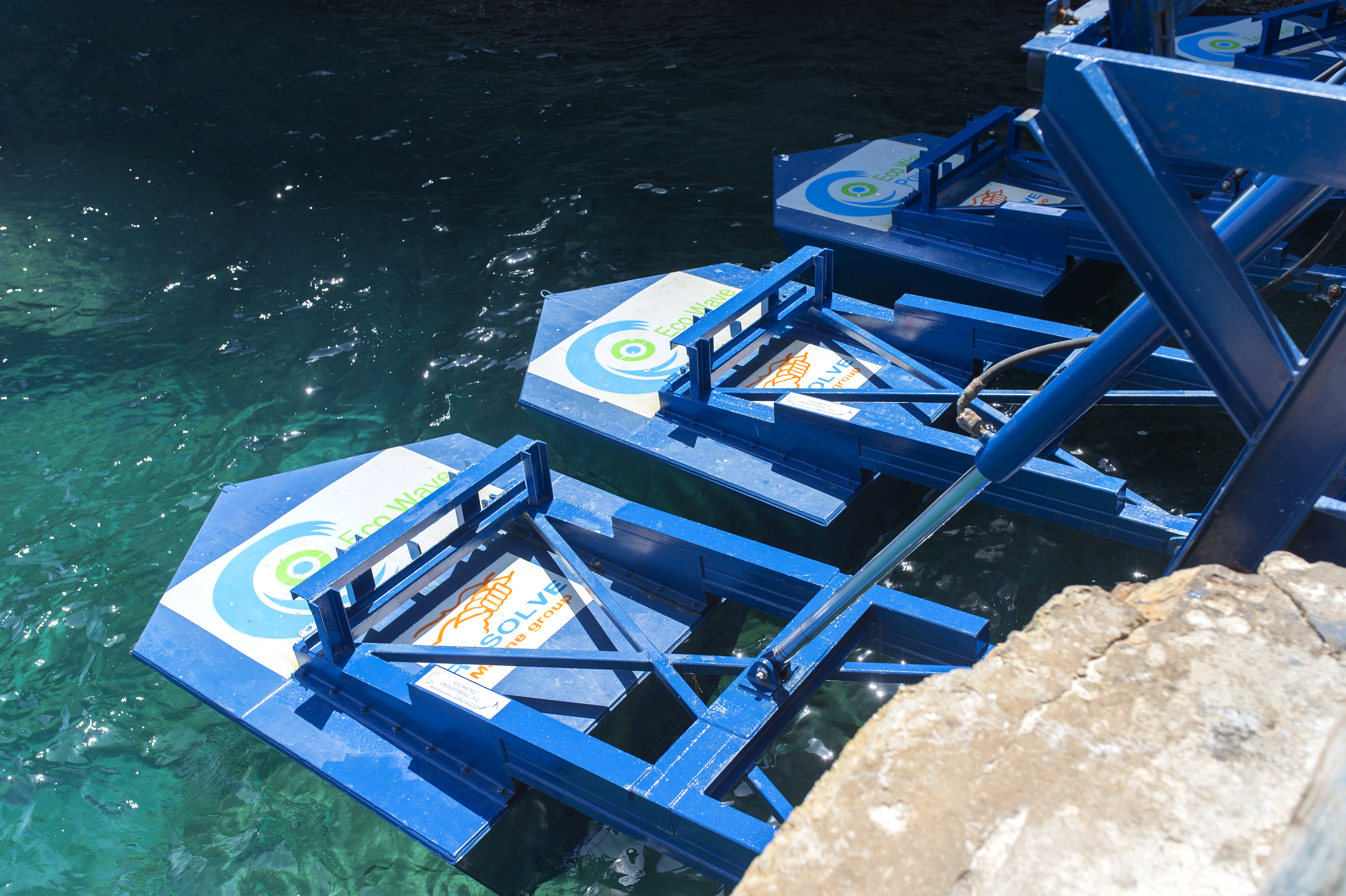
Wave energy floaters at the Gibraltar Wave Farm.
