= Irregular mare patch =

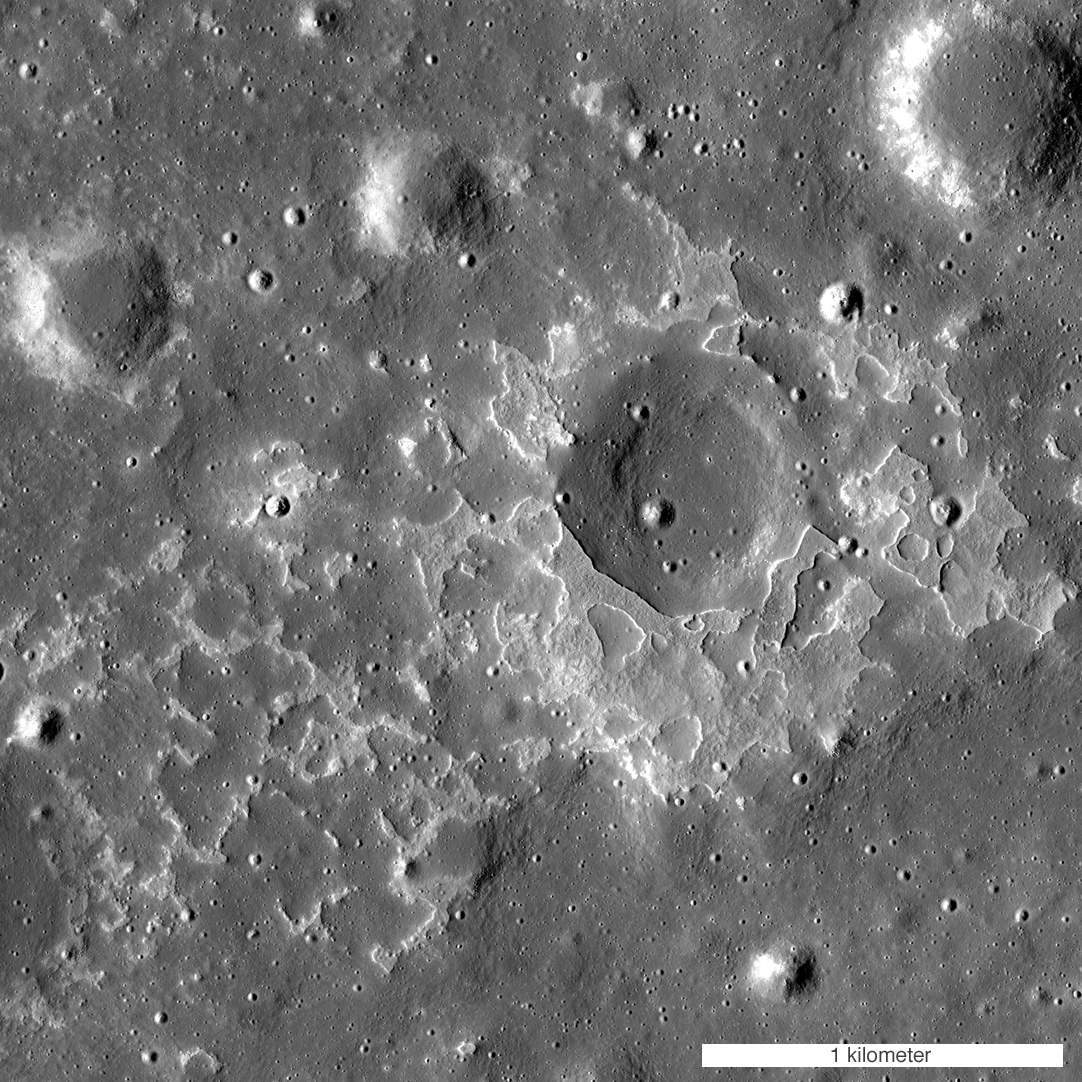
An irregular mare patch in the Mare Tranquillitatis. Note that the image may appear depth inverted; the large round object in the upper right corner is a crater and the large round object in the center is a dome.

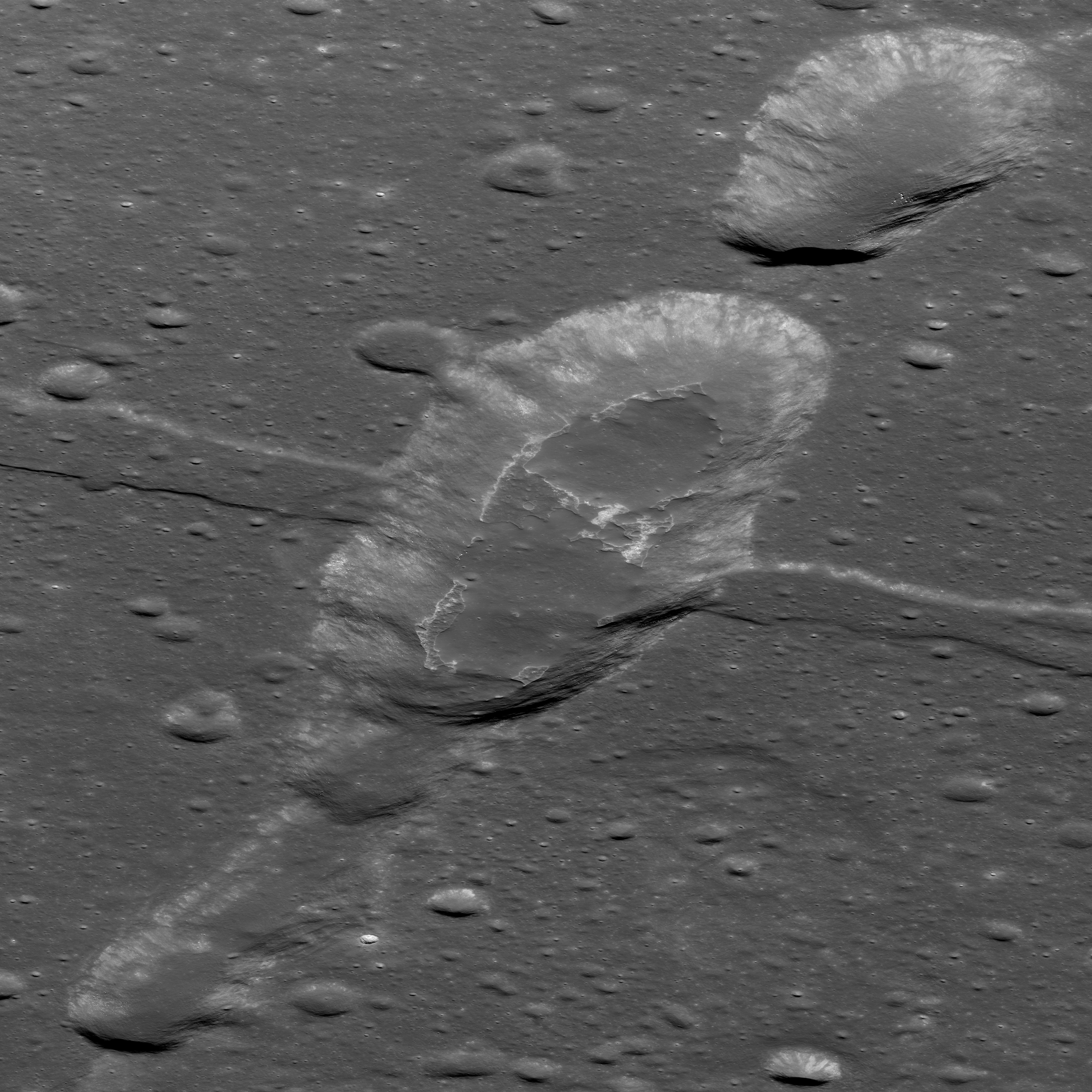
Irregular mare patch crossing Rima Sosigenes in western Mare Tranquillitatis.

An irregular mare patch also known as an IMP, is a smooth, rounded, slightly mounded area, generally about 500 meters wide, occurring in the lunar maria.

== Discovery ==
Due to their small size, and corresponding difficulty of observational astronomy from Earth, the first irregular mare patch discovered, Ina, was only found in 1971 after analysis of photographs taken by Apollo 15. More were discovered by the Lunar Reconnaissance Orbiter, which was launched in 2009 and found about 70 more.

== Origin ==
The origin of the irregular mare patches is uncertain. Crater counts, which can give an indication of the age of an area by the number of craters upon it, indicate that these regions can be as young as a few tens of millions of years old. It has been hypothesized by the LRO team that they are small volcanic lava flows, due to their spectroscopic similarity to other lava flows. However, other analysts dispute this, noting that there are many separate patches, instead of one large patch. This would require numerous small-scale eruptions. There is also no indication of flowing, as there is in lava in other eruptions on the Moon. Even more important, the hypothesis of volcanic action is at odds with the current theory of the Moon's geology, which states that the Moon should have cooled and solidified by about 1 billion years ago, precluding further geological action.

== Geological implications ==
Understanding irregular mare patches may require new geological theories to be properly explained. According to the current scientific theories, the Moon's small size means that its mantle should have fully solidified by about 1 billion years ago, which is backed up by seismic data. This would prevent any further geological action by the Moon's interior. A recent (in geological terms) eruption would indicate that the Moon has cooled much more slowly than thought, possibly due to heat released from radioactive decay of radioisotopes in the Moon.

== See also ==
- Geology of the Moon
- Ina (crater)
- Lunar mare
- Moon

== Bibliography ==
- John Moore: Irregular Mare Patches on the Moon (2019).
