= Ina Jaffe =

American journalist (1948–2024)

- Born: September 17, 1948; Chicago, Illinois, U.S.
- Died: August 1, 2024 (aged 75); Los Angeles, California, U.S.
- Occupation: Journalist
- Employer: NPR

Ina Gail Jaffe (September 17, 1948 – August 1, 2024) was an American journalist. She was a longtime correspondent for NPR.

== Early life ==
Jaffe was born in Chicago in 1948 to Charlotte Jaffe, an elementary school teacher, and Max Jaffe, a luggage manufacturer. She grew up in Glencoe. As a teenager, Jaffe sang and played guitar at coffeehouses in the city, and she began acting while attending New Trier High School.

Jaffe attended the University of Wisconsin-Madison, where she graduated with a bachelor's degree in philosophy in 1972. She went on to obtain a master's degree in philosophy from DePaul University in 1977.

== Career ==
In the 1970s, Jaffe and her husband, Lenny Kleinfeld, were members of the Chicago Organic Theater Company. While working as an actress and waitress, Jaffe also wrote some pieces for the Chicago Reader. After becoming a journalist, Jaffe used her theater background to combine "dramatic narrative" with a matter-of-fact attitude.

Jaffe was an early member of NPR's Chicago bureau in the late 1970s. In 1983, Jaffe covered the election of Harold Washington, Chicago's first Black mayor.

In 1985, after moving to NPR's office in Washington, D.C., she became the first editor of NPR's Weekend Edition. She also appeared on All Things Considered and Morning Edition.

In the late 1980s, she moved to Los Angeles to work for NPR's Western Bureau in Southern California. There, she covered the 1992 Los Angeles riots and the 2003 election of Arnold Schwarzenegger as governor.

In her later years, Jaffe was NPR's correspondent on aging, telling stories about aging "with no cuteness or condescension". In 2011 and 2012 she broke a story about the Veterans Administration leasing portions of its West Los Angeles Medical Center campus to businesses that were not focused on serving veterans. Her reporting on the case won her awards from the Society of Professional Journalists and the Alliance for Women in Media. During the COVID-19 pandemic, Jaffe reported on its impact on nursing homes.

== Personal life and death ==
Jaffe married her husband, Lenny Kleinfeld, in 1969. The two had met while attending the University of Wisconsin.

Jaffe was diagnosed with breast cancer in 2012, and with metastatic breast cancer in 2019. She wrote about the diagnosis publicly in 2021. She died from the cancer in Los Angeles, on August 1, 2024, at the age of 75.
