= Lacus Felicitatis =

Surface feature on the Moon

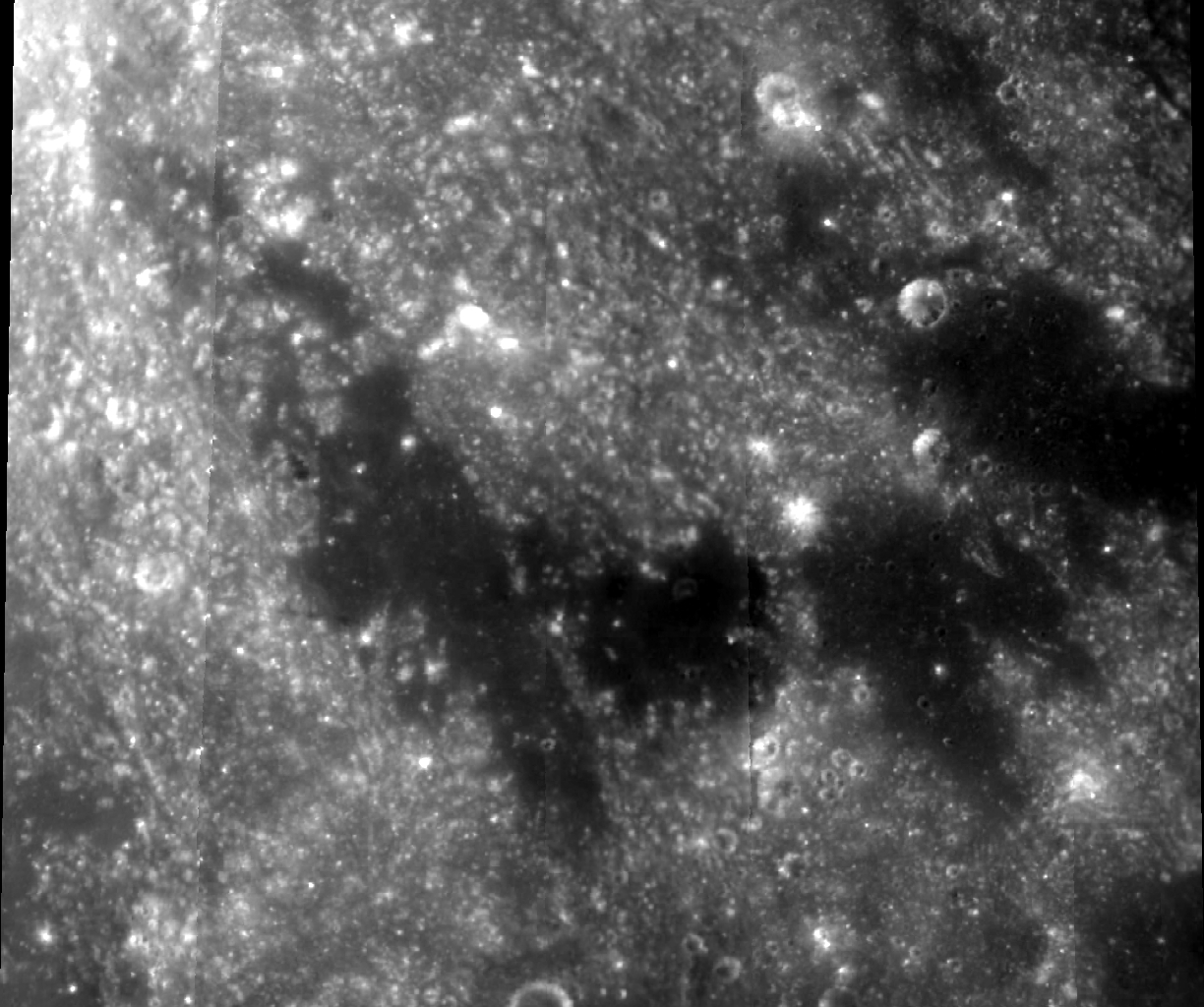
- Coordinates: 18.5°N 5.4°E
- Diameter: 98 km (61 mi)

Lacus Felicitatis (Latin fēlīcitātis, "Lake of Happiness") is a small patch of the lunar surface that has been inundated by flows of lava, leaving a level patch with a lower albedo than the surrounding ground. It is located in Terra Nivium, an area of continental ground to the north of the Mare Vaporum. About 70–80 km to the northeast of this area are the Montes Haemus, along the southwestern edge of the Mare Serenitatis.

The selenographic coordinates of the centre of Lacus Felicitatis are 18.5° N, 5.4° E, and it has a maximum extent of 98 km. In outline it has a bent shape, with a wing to the northwest and another to the east. The border is somewhat uneven, and it is surrounded by rugged lunar surface.

Three tiny craters within this formation have been assigned names by the IAU. These are listed below.

Crater	Coordinates	Diameter	Name source
Dag	18.7° N, 5.3° E	0.5 km	Scandinavian masculine name
Ina	18.6° N, 5.3° E	3 km	Latin feminine name
Osama	18.6° N, 5.2° E	0.5 km	Arabic masculine name

Ina is a semi-circular depression that is only about 30 m deep and is difficult to image from the Earth. In November 2006, it was suggested that Ina was the result of a gas eruption in the last 10 million years.

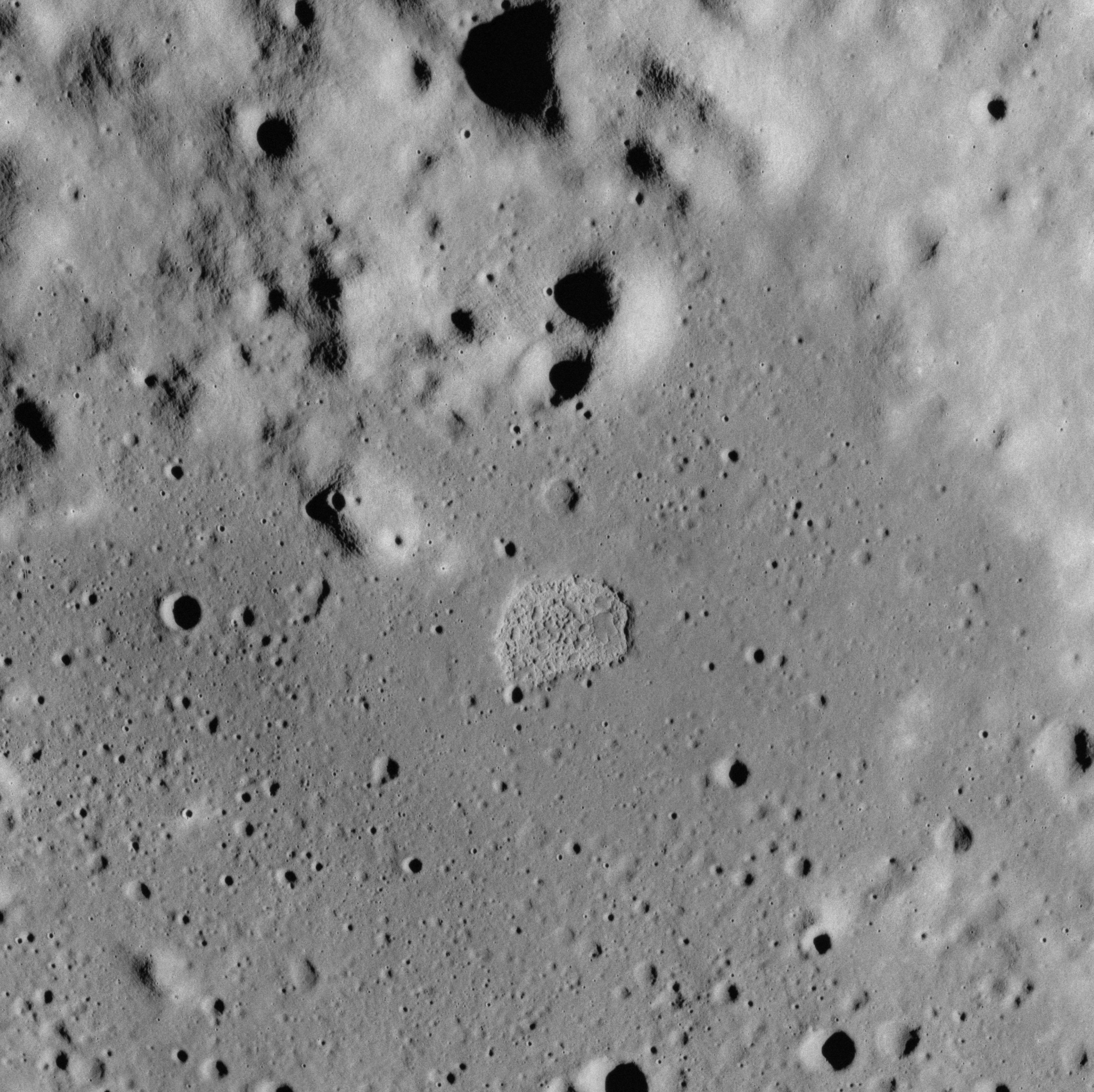
Apollo 17 Mapping camera image of Ina (center)

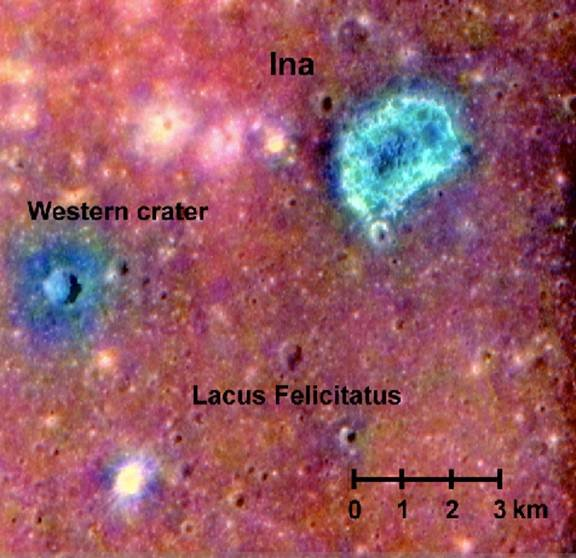
Lacus Felicitatis's crater Ina gives signs of recent geological activity

== See also ==
- Volcanism on the Moon
