= Gibraltar Electricity Authority =

Agency overview
- Formed: 28 March 2003
- Jurisdiction: Gibraltar
- Agency executive: Chief Executive
- Website: www.gibelec.gi

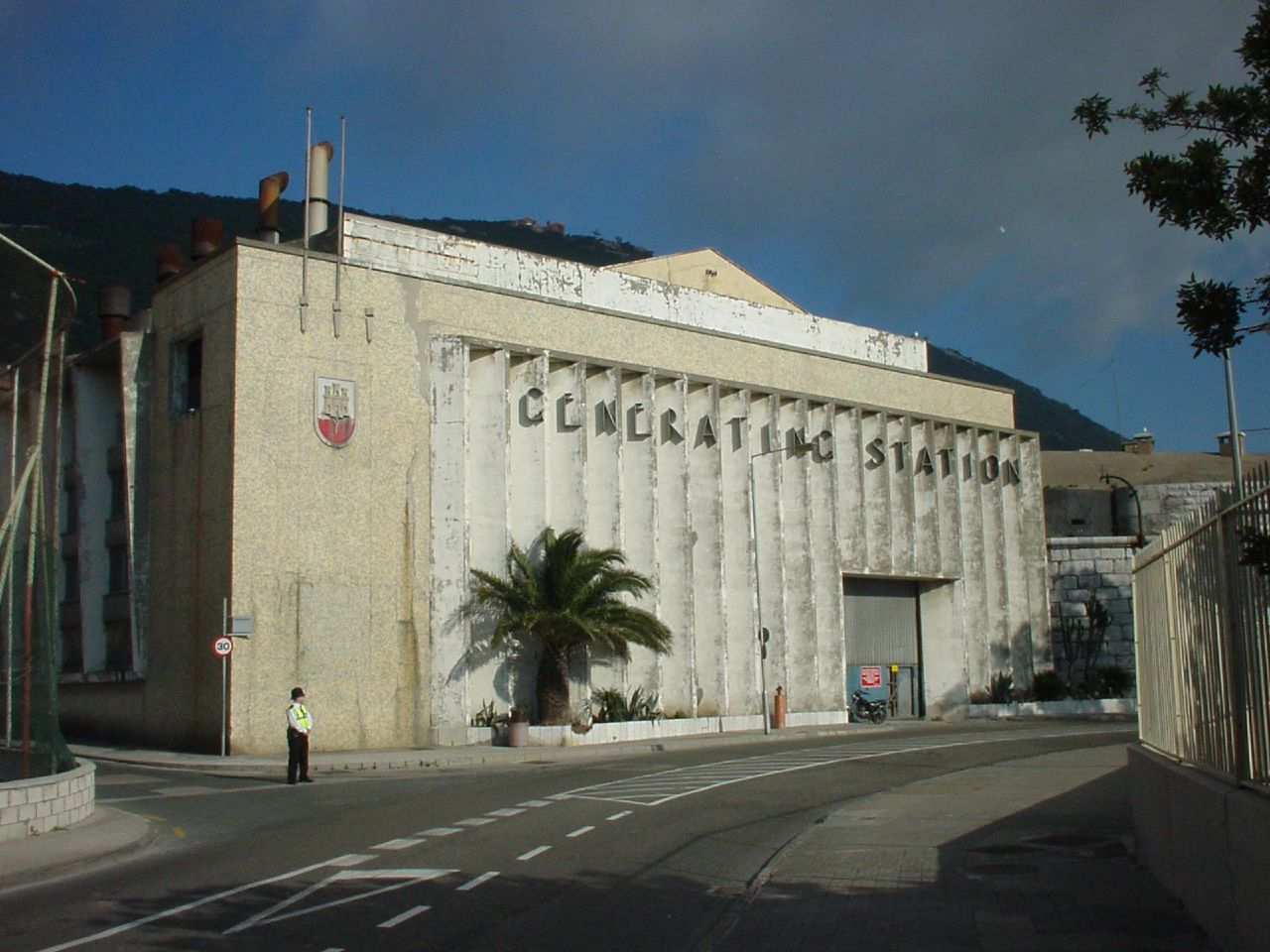
The generating station adjacent to King's Bastion in 2002, three years prior to its demolition.

Gibraltar Electricity Authority is an agency under the Government of Gibraltar responsible for regulating the Gibraltar electricity market. The authority was created on 28 March 2003 under the Gibraltar Electricity Authority Act 2003. Its responsibility is to generate, distribute and supply electricity to the civilian population of Gibraltar.

== History ==
In 1890, the Colonial Government of Gibraltar commissioned Welsh electrical engineer William Henry Preece (1834–1913) to "enquire into the propriety of introducing electric light" into the territory. On 15 September 1896, construction of the King’s Bastion Power Station, based in the old King's Bastion, was started with the help of a loan raised under the Electric Light Ordinance of 1892. The first demonstration of electric lighting in Gibraltar was conducted in April 1897. The Electric Light department was established on 9 March 1898.

The Government of Gibraltar passed an act in the House of Assembly on 28 March 2003 to establish the Gibraltar Electricity Authority to regulate electricity supply for the civilian population.

In 2018 a new LNG-fuelled power station was commissioned at Gibraltar Harbour.
