= IINA =

Free and open-source media player

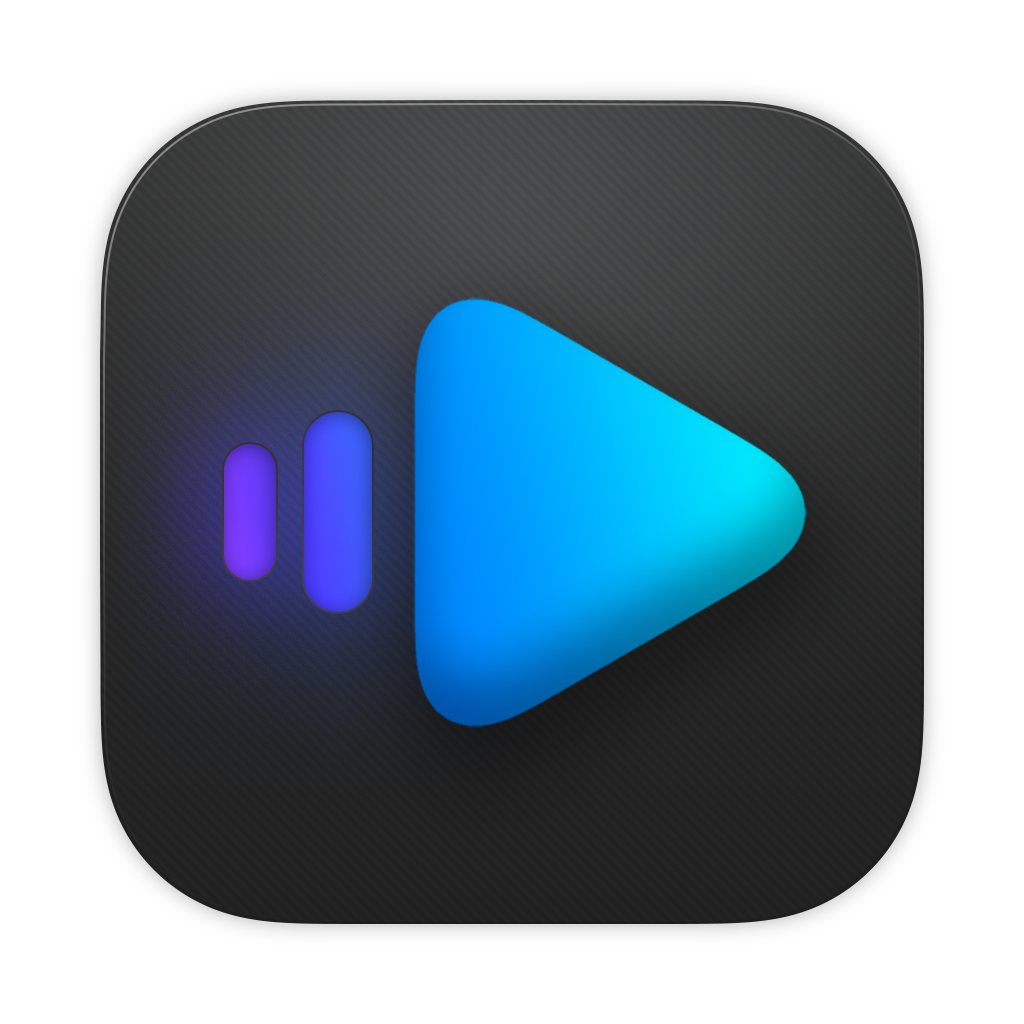

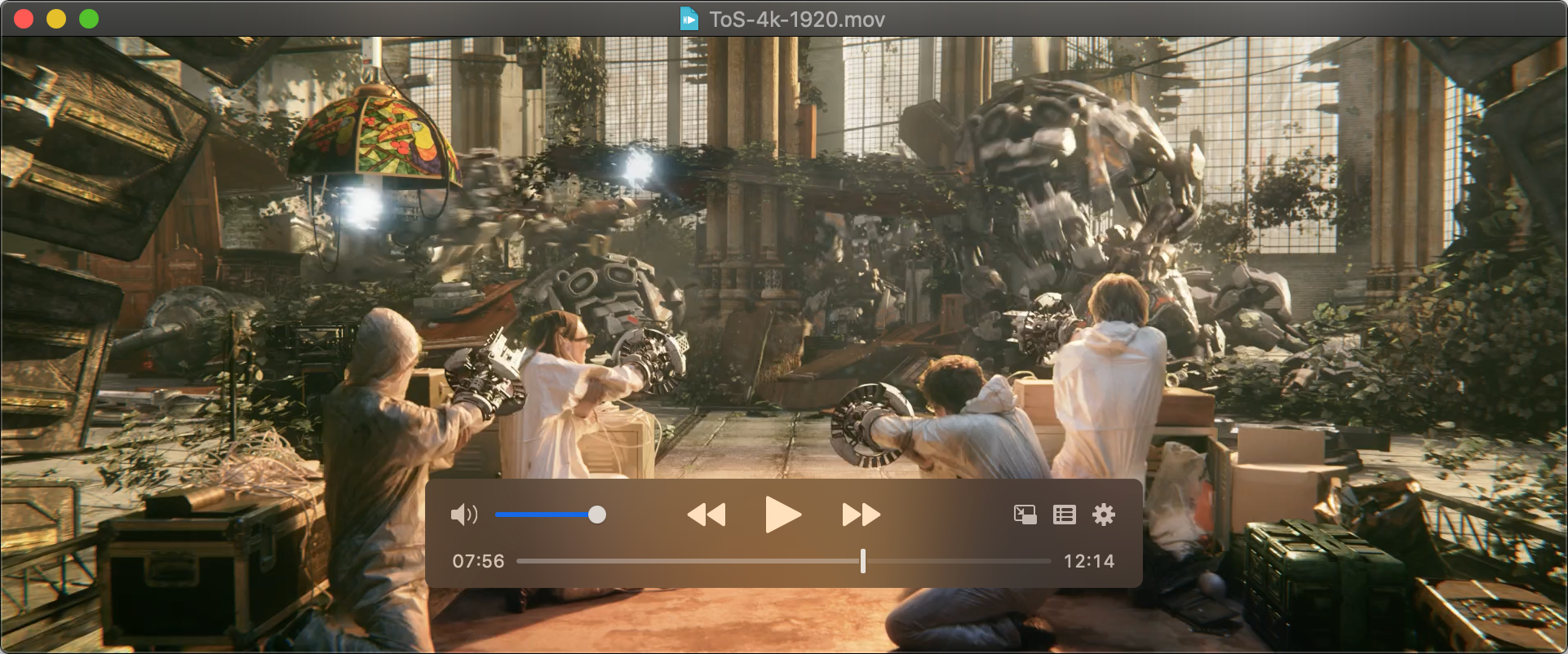
- IINA playing Tears of Steel
- Original author: Collider LI
- Developer: iina.io
- Initial release: January 3, 2017; 8 years ago
- Stable release: 1.4.1 (25 September 2025; 3 months ago)
- Repository: https://github.com/iina/iina/
- Written in: Swift
- Operating system: macOS
- Platform: x86-64, ARM64 (Apple silicon)
- Type: Media player
- License: GNU GPLv3
- Website: iina.io

IINA (/ˈiːnə/) is a free and open-source media player software based on mpv and written in Swift for macOS. It is released under the GNU General Public License version 3 (GPLv3).
