= Ina Besche-Krastl =

German politician (born 1986)

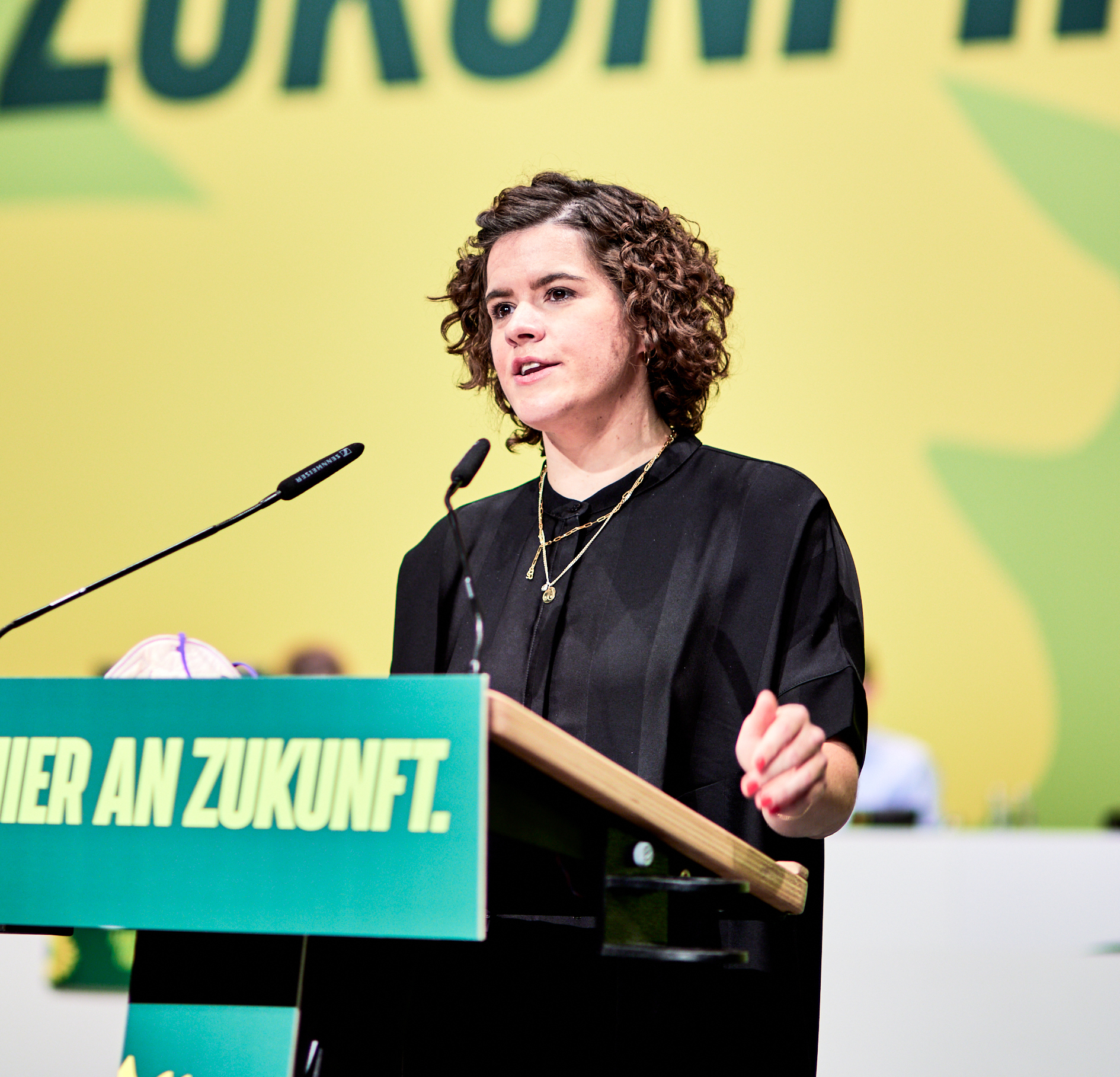
- Besche-Krastl in 2021

Member of the Landtag of North Rhine-Westphalia
- Incumbent
- Assumed office 1 June 2022

Personal details
- Born: 1986 (age 39–40) Mettmann
- Party: Alliance 90/The Greens (since 2009)

Ina Besche-Krastl (born 1986 in Mettmann) is a German politician serving as a member of the Landtag of North Rhine-Westphalia since 2022. She has been a district councillor of Mettmann since 2014.
