= Ina Norris =

American dramatist

Ina Norris is an American playwright, poet, producer, mentor, and educator. She lives in The Bronx, New York. Her first play Nobody Loves a Black Little Girl When She Becomes A Woman, was an examination of the experiences of a Black woman.

== Early life and education ==
Norris is a native New Yorker. She graduated from Hampton University, with a degree in psychology.

== Career ==
Norris is a community coordinator, and a public servant in social services. She has worked as the Director for the Performing Arts at the Learning Tree Preparatory School in The Bronx, New York. She mentors inner city youth in theater, and writes and produces to educate youth about life through theater. She is the founder of the NYC Young Producers Project. In 1991, Norris created In A Woman Productions. She was founder and director of the Kwanzaa Film Festival that was started in 2017.

She wrote the play Nobody Loves a Black Little Girl When She Becomes a Woman that focuses on self-love and examining one's self and society through the lens of being a Black woman. She described the play as "being a piece that is a theatrical sermon on loving yourself." Norris produced and wrote the play A Secret Lies Inside My Sister's Womb which made its debut at the Schomburg Center for Research in Black Culture. Her third play Ain't Yo Mama Crying On The Pancake Box-Car, for which she was awarded a Gregory Millard New York Foundation for the Arts Fellowship, debuted at the Henry Street Settlement Playhouse in New York City. She produced The Turnstyle Warrior, which debuted at the American Theater for Actors and was also performed at the Negro Ensemble Company, and hosted by Broadway producer Danny Simmons of Rush Philanthropic. Its music was produced by Dame Grease. Her play Don't Play That Song for me, was produced by Barbara Ann Teer of the National Black Theatre. She produced the play Danny's Waltz with Danny Simmons of Def Poetry Jam.

In 2000, Norris was a recipient of a New York Foundation for the Arts NYSCA/NYFA Artist Fellowship in Playwriting/Screenwriting.
