= Inna Braverman =

Israeli entrepreneur and businesswoman

- אינה ברוורמן
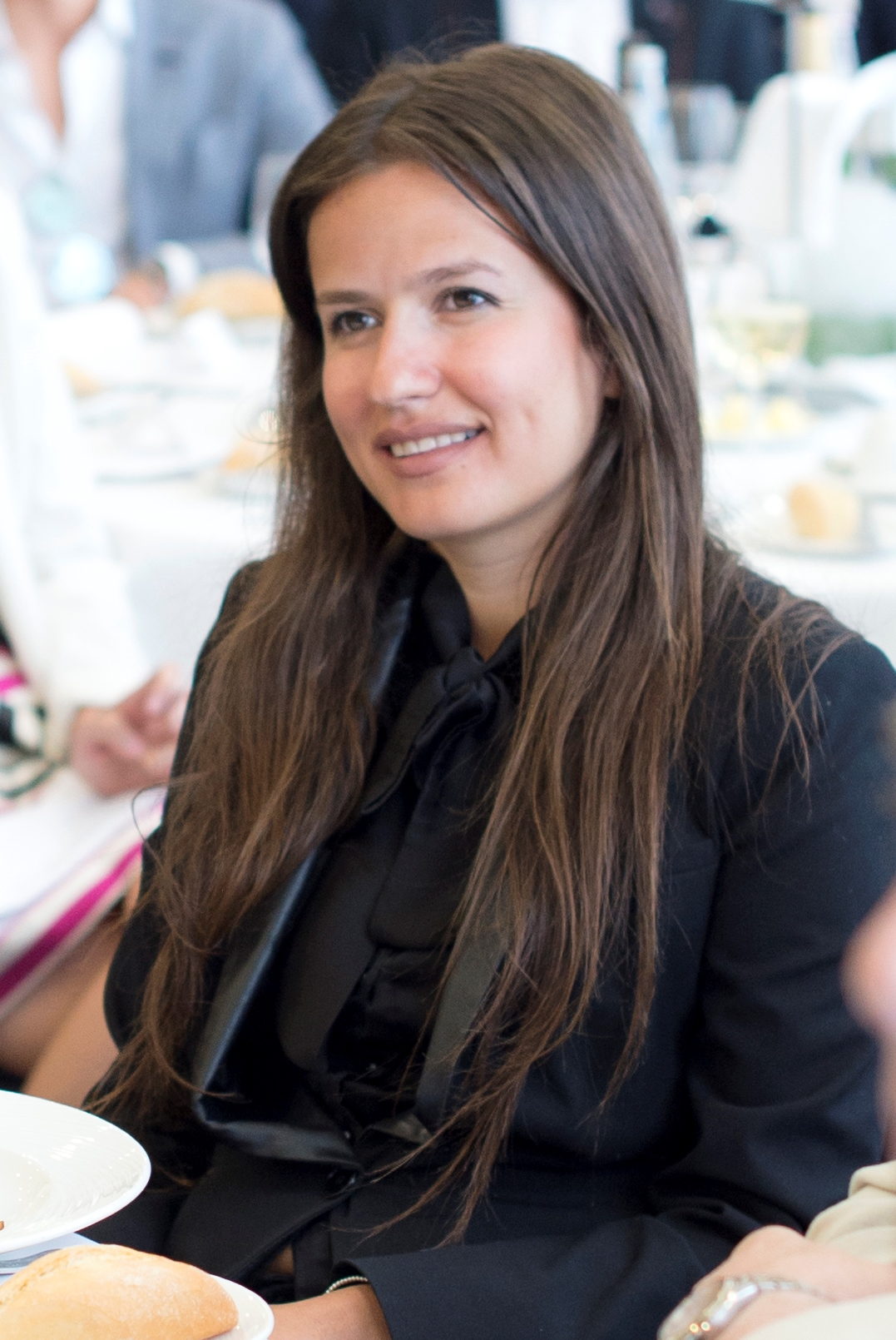
- Born: April 11, 1986 (age 40); Ukraine
- Education: BA in Political Science and English Language and Literature
- Alma mater: University of Haifa

Inna Braverman (Hebrew: אינה ברוורמן) is an Israeli entrepreneur and businesswoman. She is the co-founder and CEO of Eco Wave Power, a renewable energy company with a patented technology for the generation of clean electricity from ocean and sea waves. Braverman established Eco Wave Power at the age of 24, and under her leadership, Eco Wave Power installed its first grid-connected wave energy array in Gibraltar, secured a projects pipeline of 254MW, and became the first Israeli company to ever list on Nasdaq Stockholm (ticker symbol ECOWVE).

Braverman was recognized by Wired Magazine as one of the "Females Changing the World", by Fast Company as one of the world's "Most Creative People in Business for 2020" and is the winner of the United Nations "Global Climate Action Award".

== Biography ==
Braverman was born in Ukraine on April 11, 1986, just two weeks before the Chernobyl nuclear disaster and suffered respiratory arrest due to the pollution in the region. Her mother, a nurse, came to her crib on time and gave her a mouth to mouth resuscitation, which saved her life. According to Braverman, receiving a second chance in life, made her want to do something good for the world and created a feeling of purpose.

When she was four years old, her family immigrated to Israel, and settled in Akko. After high school, Braverman enrolled at the University of Haifa as a Political Science and English Language and Literature major, and graduated in 2010.

== Career ==
Braverman met David Leb, a Canadian businessman, while he was visiting Israel. The two co-founded Eco Wave Power in 2011.

Braverman travelled for the next one and a half year between Israel and Ukraine working on the design and development of the buoys and technology for generating energy from waves. In 2013, Eco Wave Power installed the first wave energy power plant in Jaffa Port, Israel. As a result, Braverman was shortlisted for the Business Green Leaders Award in 2013, in the category of Young Sustainability Executive of the Year. Eco Wave Power obtained awards from consulting firm Frost and Sullivan in 2012 and 2013.

Braverman attended the Shell and CNBC Energy Challenge in 2013. She and her team won the event for their idea. In 2014, Braverman was invited by the United Nations to attend the Climate Summit in New York, where she presented her ideas on the use of wave energy as a resource. Subsequently, in 2015, she also participated in 2015 United Nations Climate Change Conference that was held in Paris. Eco Wave Power raised $2 million in fundraising the same year.

She is also a contributor to different technological magazines and publications, such as Green Port Magazine.

In 2016, Braverman led the execution of the Gibraltar Wave Farm. The official opening of the wave energy power station took place in May 2016. It was attended by Braverman, Fabian Picardo, the Chief Minister of Gibraltar, and John Cortes, the Minister of Health and Environment.

In July 2016, her company was noted as Best Woman-Owned Renewable Energy Company in Israel by CV Magazine. She was selected by Smithsonian Magazine as one of eight young innovators with ingenious ideas for the future of energy.

In 2017, Braverman was featured in the January issue of Wired Magazine UK for her accomplishments and contributions in the wave technology field and was listed on Medium.com Website as one of the 100 makers and mavericks of 2016. Braverman spoke at the Brain Bar Budapest in 2017.

Braverman was a speaker at the Knesset (the Israeli Parliament) in 2017 on the International Women's Day about her personal experience as a woman and an immigrant in business.

In 2018, CNN chose her as "Tomorrow's Hero" with Sanjay Gupta presenting her contribution to shaping the wave energy field. Also, Eco Wave Power was featured in Pictet Bank's report on smart energy as a technology that shows prospects of the future. In 2019, Braverman led Eco Wave Power's public listing on Nasdaq Stockholm, thus becoming the first Israeli company to ever list on this exchange.

To date, Braverman gave 3 TedX talks and her personal journey as a female entrepreneur and was documented in a virtual reality film by Google, under the name "Female Planet". In 2020, she was also profiled by the Sustainable Markets Initiative, curated by editor-in-chief HRH Prince Charles of Wales, in collaboration with the World Economic Forum and the Bank of America.

== Awards and recognition ==
- "100 Makers and Mavericks" by Medium.com
- Wired's list of "Females Changing the World"
- Winner of the Women4Climate award by C40
- "Eight young innovators with ingenious ideas for the future of energy" by Smithsonian Magazine
- Recognized as "Tomorrow's Hero" by CNN
- The Most Influential Women of the 21st Century by MSN.com
- Winner of the United Nations Climate Action Award, in the category of "Women for Results"
- 80 European founders and companies shaping the post-pandemic world by Sifted.eu
- Recognized as "Most Creative People in Business 2020" by Fast Company
- Recipient of the "Green Innovation Award" under the "European Tech Women Awards 2020" by the UK Department for International Trade
- "50 of the World's Most Influential Jews" by Jerusalem Post
- "EU Prize for Women Innovators" 2020 Finalist
- Falling Walls 2020 Finalist for "Breaking the Wall of Wave Power"
