= Ina (surname) =

Ina (written: 伊奈) is a Japanese surname. Notable people with the surname include:

- Eiji Ina (伊奈 英次, born 1957), Japanese photographer
- Jana Ina (born 1976), Brazilian television host and model
- Kanta Ina (伊奈 貫太), Japanese actor
- Kyoko Ina (伊奈 恭子, born 1972), Japanese-American figure skater
- Yūsuke Ina (伊奈 祐介, born 1975), Japanese shogi player
