= Ina (crater) =

Unusual small depression on the Moon

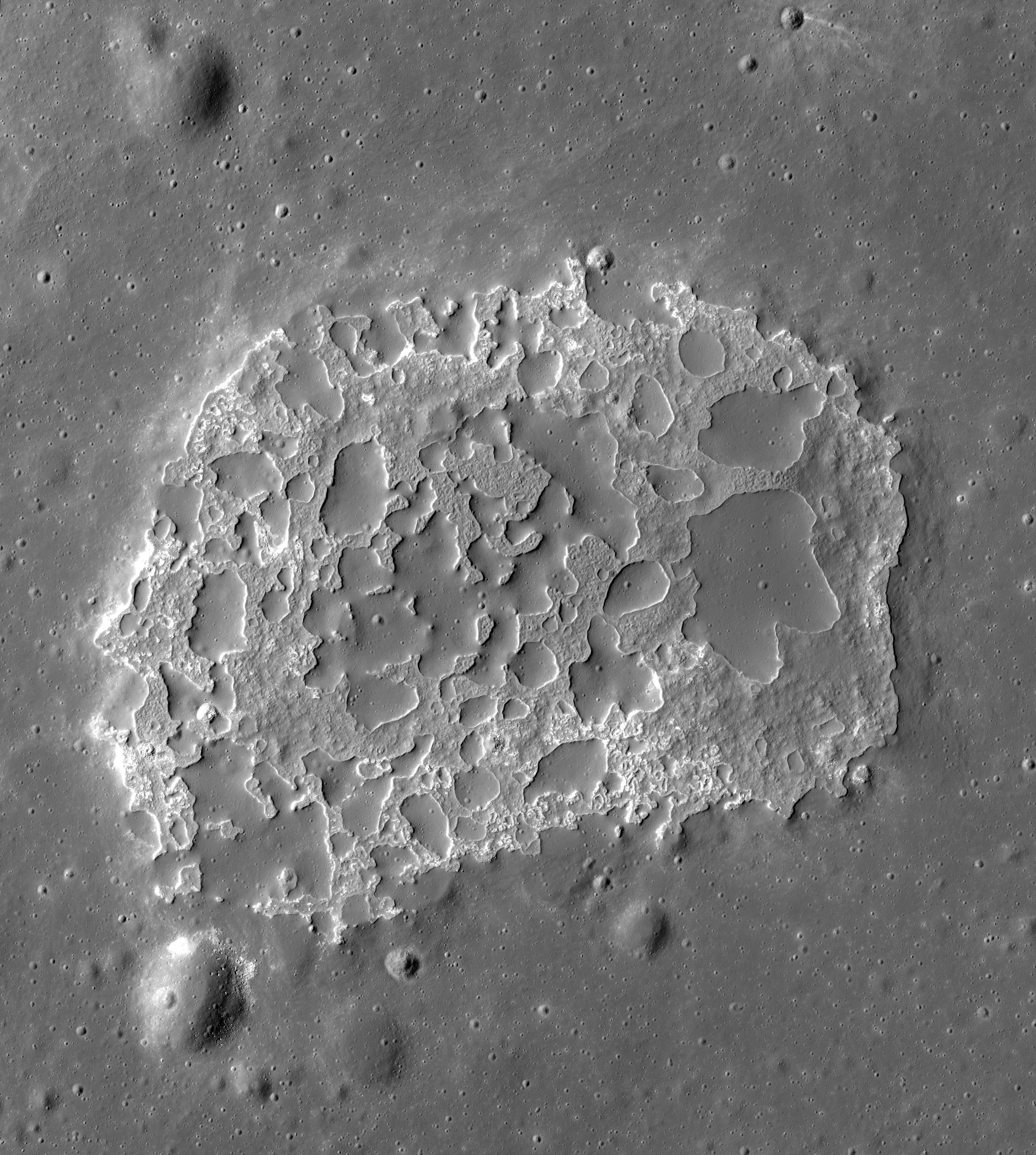
- Ina seen by Lunar Reconnaissance Orbiter. Small crater at lower left is Osama, at upper left ‒ Dag; the biggest hill in right part of Ina is Mons Agnes. Image width is 3.5 km
- Coordinates: 18.66°N 5.30°E
- Diameter: 2.9 km × 1.9 km
- Depth: 64 m
- Eponym: Latin female name Ina

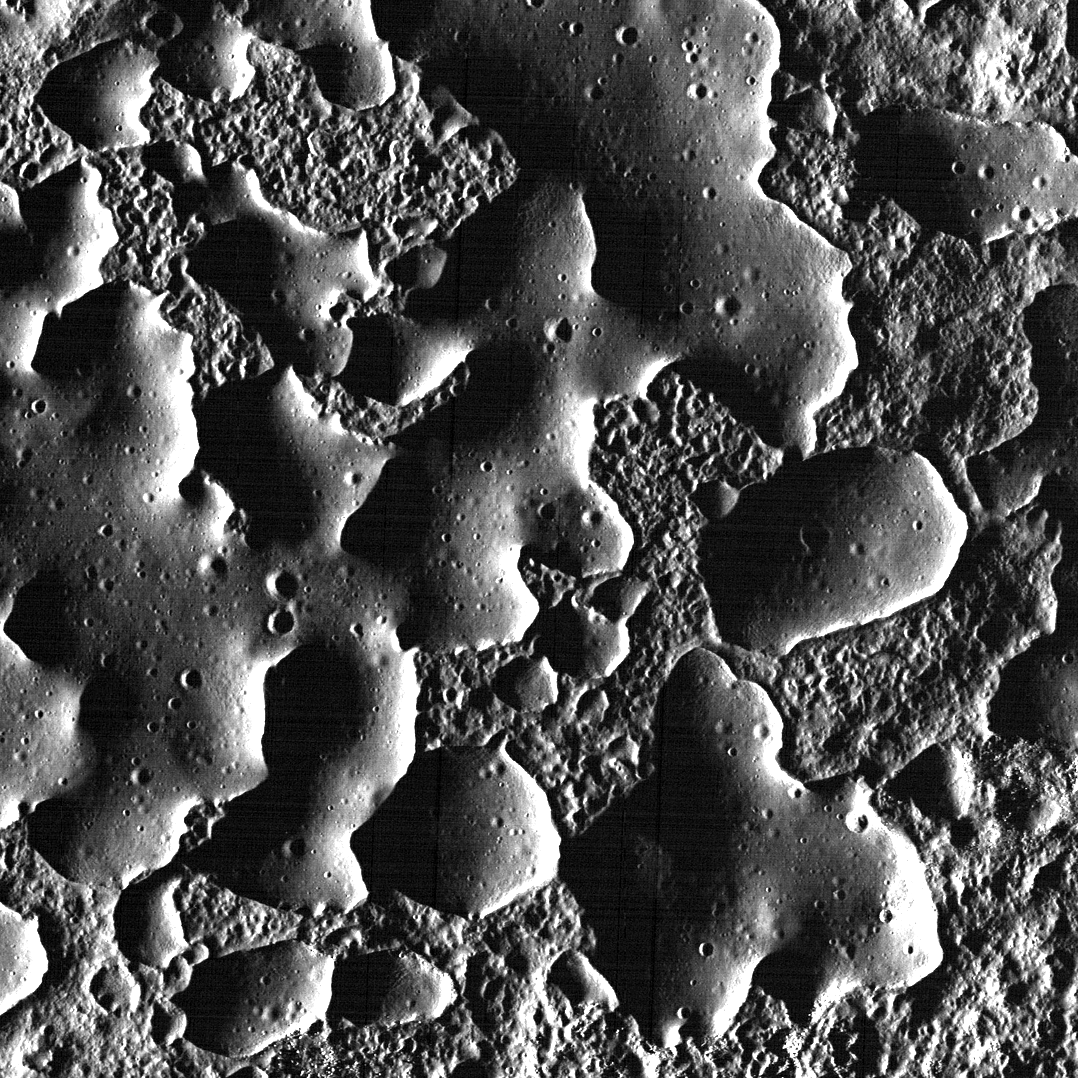
The floor of Ina lighted by low Sun (6.6° above the horizon). Image width is 1 km

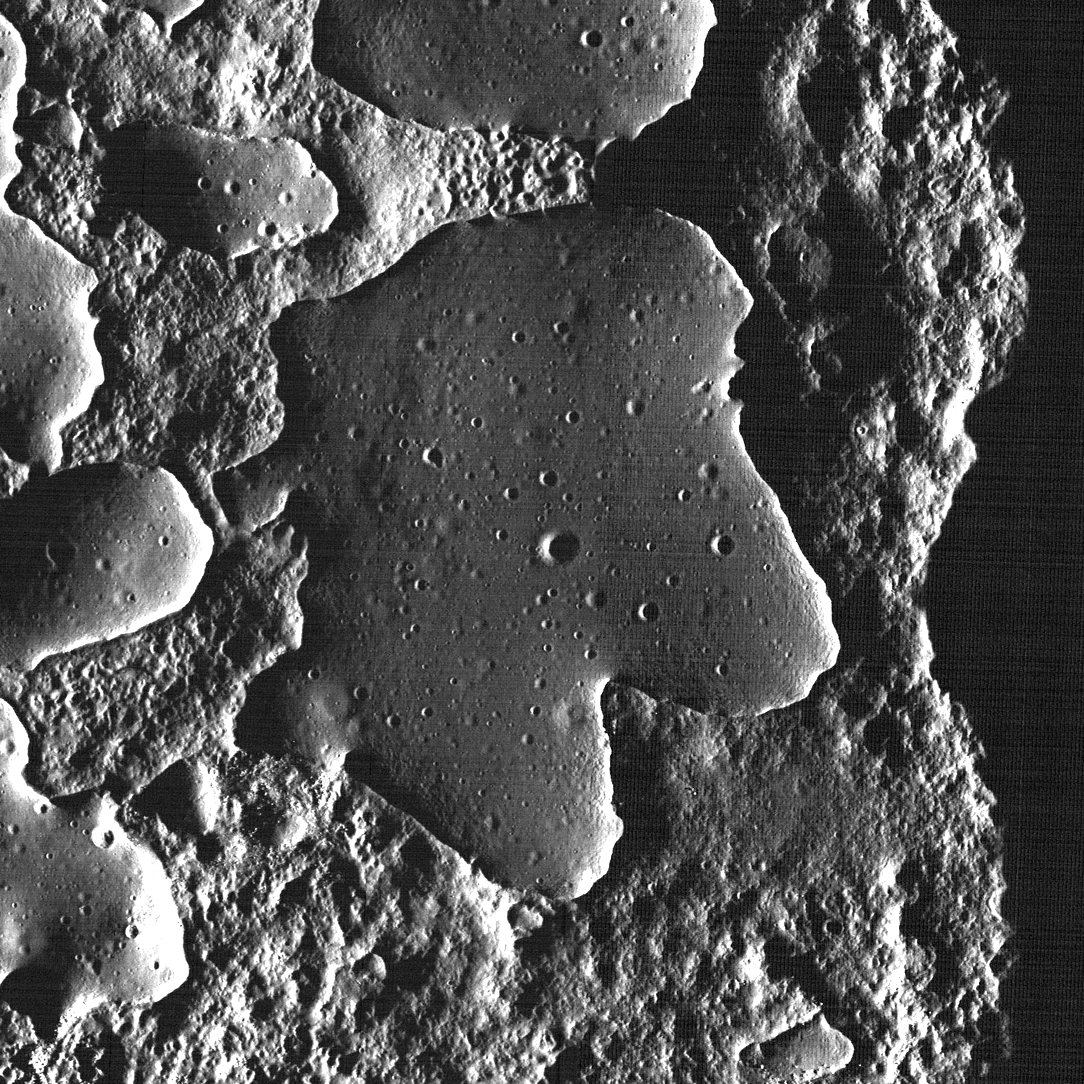
Mons Agnes: the only named hill inside Ina. Image width is 1 km

Ina is a peculiar small depression ("crater" in IAU nomenclature) on the Moon, in Lacus Felicitatis. It is D-shaped, 2.9 km × 1.9 km wide and 64 m deep (from the deepest point of the bottom to the highest point of the rim).

Ina is remarkable for several dozens low hills with flat or rounded tops and very sharp rounded boundaries, looking like drops of mercury. Their surface looks like the usual surface of the Moon while the space between them is very different. Ina is the most prominent of several dozen similar features on the Moon. Their origin is unclear.

== Discovery, exploration and naming ==
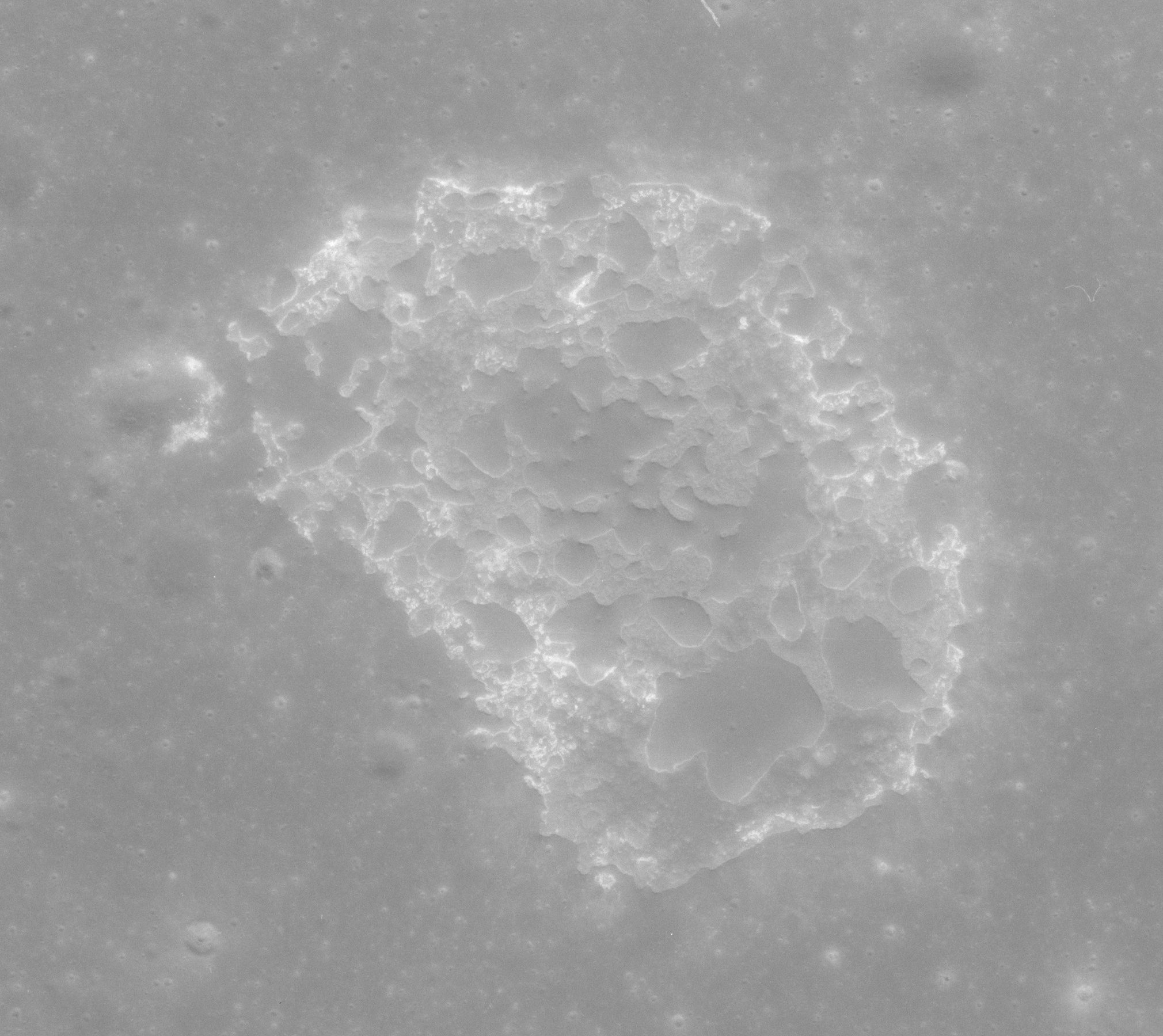
Ina as imaged by Apollo 15 panoramic camera

Ina was discovered on photographs taken in 1971 by the crew of Apollo 15 from lunar orbit. It could have been found 5 years earlier on images taken by Lunar Orbiter 4 had a photographic flaw not prevented this. At the end of 1972 Ina was observed and photographed by the crew of Apollo 17. After Apollo it was reconnoitred by several orbiting spacecraft beginning in 2009 when the Lunar Reconnaissance Orbiter obtained photos of Ina with resolution of about 0.5 m/pixel and with varying illumination angles.

On a topophotomap published in 1974 by NASA this feature was given the Latin female name Ina, in accordance with the convention to give small lunar craters human first names. In 1979 this name was adopted by the International Astronomical Union. In Apollo-era publications the feature is called D-caldera due to its shape, and at the time it was believed to be a unique feature on the moon.

Two neighbouring features were named in 1976. They are the small craters Osama on Ina's southwestern edge and Dag to its northwest (both 400 m in diameter). The widest hill in the eastern part of Ina (650 m wide) was named Mons Agnes in 1979.

In July 2023, NASA announced the selection of a new scientific payload called Dating an Irregular Mare Patch with a Lunar Explorer (DIMPLE) to establish the age and composition of volcanic activity at Ina.

== Description ==
Ina is located on top of a rounded upland (dome) 300 m high and 15 km in diameter. It is situated on an elongated plateau (horst) about 30 km wide. This plateau stands in the middle of Lacus Felicitatis ‒ a small lunar lake between Mare Serenitatis, Mare Vaporum and Mare Imbrium.

Ina is a D-shaped depression 2.9 km × 1.9 km wide. It has an elevated rim 600–1000 m wide and 30–40 m high. The eastern part of the rim is 10 m higher than the western. Its outer slope is very gently sloping (1°–3°) and lacks a distinct edge while the inner slope is very steep (tens of degrees) and has a very sharp border with the depression. The deepest point of the depression is located somewhat to the northwest of its center. This point is 30 m deeper than the edges of the depression and 64 m deeper than the highest point of the rim.

There are 2 clearly distinct types of surface inside Ina: hills and lowlands. The surface of the hills looks like the usual surface of Lacus Felicitatis while the surface of the lowlands is very different.

There are several dozen hills within Ina. They are diverse in size and have rounded amoeba-like edges, like drops of mercury. Many of them are interconnected with other hills or with the edge of the depression. They are rather low (5–25 m, usually 10–15 m). Their tops are flat or slightly rounded while their slopes are steep. The edges of the hills are usually very sharp. Often they are surrounded by a little moat. The boundary between the hills and the lowland has the same appearance as the outer boundary of the depression. The surface of the hills is very smooth compared to the lowlands. In addition, although the sample size is not great, the hills do have an impact crater density intermediate between the fresh lowlands and the ancient neighboring plains of Lacus Felicitatis.

Ina's lowlands are much rougher than its hills and show lots of small irregular relief features whose height is no more than several meters. Some craters are also discernible there. Some of the lowlands contain small patches with very bright tone. These are outcrops of scattered rocks 1–5 m in size. Such patches are located mainly near the border between the lowlands and the hills, especially in the lowest places.

Ina's lowlands are bright bluish-grey. The hills are darker and brown (the usual lunar surface colour). The lowlands resemble freshly exposed basalt with high titanium content like the basalt seen in some young impact craters. Ina is surrounded by a weak dark halo. The surface of its surroundings is slightly more blue than the more distant surface.

== Analogs ==
Ina is the most prominent, large and well-known representative of a class of features called irregular mare patches, which are also known as "meniscus hollows" for the similarity of their edges to a convex meniscus. Several dozen such features are known on the Moon, all located on the maria. They are hypothesized to be volcanic in origin but several alternative hypotheses exist (see Origin below) and their origin is far from certain. Somewhat similar but distinct features, called hollows, are rather common on Mercury. These features differ from lunar meniscus hollows in having bright halos; they are also more widespread, often bigger and usually located in impact craters.

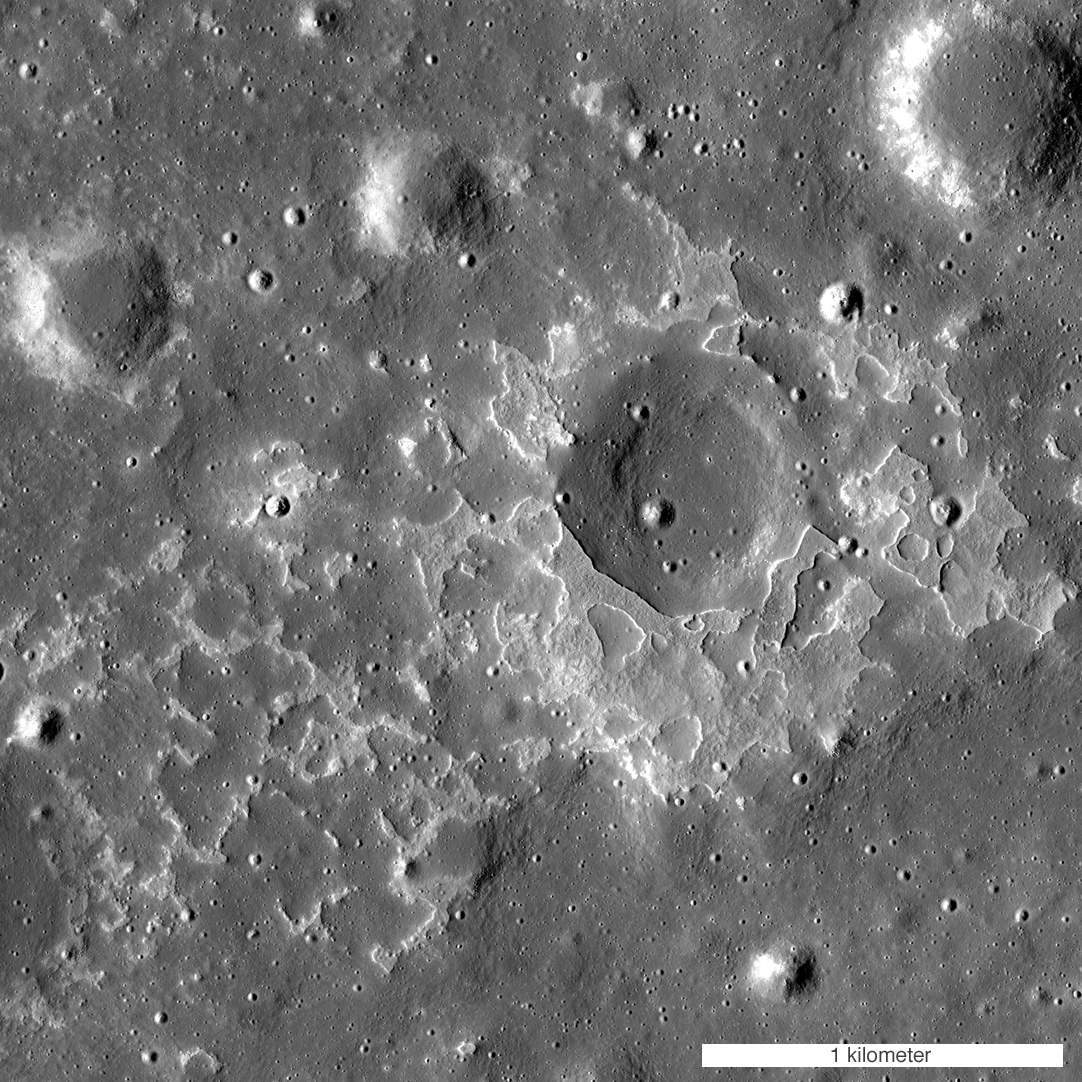
Ina-like feature in lunar Mare Tranquillitatis. Width of the image is 3 km.

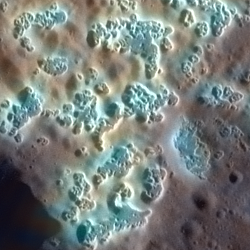
Hollows on Mercury. Colors are enhanced. Width of the image is 7 km.

== Interpretations ==
=== Age ===
The surface of Ina's lowlands seems to be much younger than the surface of its hills and outer surroundings. Evidence of this includes the light color and low concentration of craters on these lowlands. The Moon's surface darkens over time and multiple meteorite impacts dot it with craters, blur sharp edges of all relief features and make slopes more gentle. Ina seems to be one of the youngest features on the Moon. The surface of the hills is much older: its age seems to be roughly equal to the age of the usual surface of Lacus Felicitatis (more than 1 billion years) but the slopes and edges of these hills are young: they couldn't maintain their steepness and sharpness even for 50 million years. The dome on which Ina sits seems to be somewhat younger than its surroundings, judging from crater concentration.

On the other hand, there is a lower estimate for the age of the tops of Ina's hills: 33±2 million years (based on crater counts with the result of 137 craters/km^{2} for craters >10 m in diameter).

The latest research suggests Ina is not so young. The study looked at well-studied volcanoes on Earth that might be similar to Ina. Ina appears to be a pit crater on a shield volcano, a gently sloping mountain similar to the Kilauea volcano in Hawaii. Kilauea has a pit crater similar to Ina known as the Kilauea Iki crater, which last erupted in 1959.

As lava from that eruption solidified, it created a highly porous rock layer inside the pit with underground vesicles as large as three feet in diameter and surface void space as deep as two feet. That porous surface, Head and his colleagues say, is created by the nature of the lava erupted in the late stages of events like this. As the subsurface lava supply starts to diminish, it erupts as "magmatic foam" - a bubbly mixture of lava and gas. When that foam cools and solidifies it forms the highly porous surface.

The researchers suggest that an Ina eruption would also have produced magmatic foam. And because of the Moon's decreased gravity and nearly absent atmosphere the lunar foam would have been even fluffier than on Earth so it is expected that the structures within Ina are even more porous than on Earth.

It is the high porosity of those surfaces that throws off date estimates for Ina, both by hiding the buildup of regolith and by throwing off crater counts.

A highly porous surface, the researchers say, would allow loose rock and dust to filter into surface void space, making it appear as though less regolith has built up. That process would be perpetuated by seismic shaking in the region, much of which is caused by ongoing meteor impacts. "It's like banging on the side of a sieve to make the flour go through," Head said. "Regolith is jostled into holes rather than sitting on the surface, which makes Ina look a lot younger."

Porosity could also skew crater counts. Laboratory experiments using a high-speed projectile cannon have shown that impacts into porous targets make much smaller craters. Because of Ina's extreme porosity, the researchers say, its craters are much smaller than they would normally be, and many craters might not be visible at all. That could drastically alter the age estimate derived from crater counts.

The researchers estimate that the porous surface would reduce by a factor of three the size of craters on Ina's mounds. In other words, an impactor that would make a 100-foot-diameter crater in lunar basalt bedrock would make a crater of a little over 30 feet in a foam deposit.

Taking that scaling relationship into account, the team gets a revised age for the Ina mounds of about 3.5 billion years old. This age is similar to the surface age of the volcanic shield that surrounds Ina, and places the Ina activity within the timeframe of common volcanism on the Moon.

The researchers believe this work offers a plausible explanation for Ina's formation without having to invoke the puzzling billion-year pause in volcanic activity.

"We think the young-looking features in Ina are the natural consequence of magmatic foam eruptions on the Moon," Head said. "The landforms created by these foams simply look a lot younger than they are."

=== Origin ===
Ina's origin is unclear as of 2015. Firstly it was interpreted as a caldera of a very low ancient volcano. Another version considers it as a result of powerful ejection of some gases (volcanic or even radiogenic), which removed regolith. In that case the hills are places where the original regolith was preserved. The other hypothesis says that the hills are lava flows, inflated during growth under some dense coating. All these versions have flaws. In particular, Ina does not seem to have a ring of volcanic ejecta, and the volcanic activity on the Moon seems to have ceased a long time ago.

According to one another version, Ina appeared (and continues to form) due to collapse of the regolith into some underground cavities. These may be ancient lava tubes or the result of evaporation of volatile compounds. In that case the bright rocky places on Ina's floor are where the regolith has already fallen while darker parts of the lowlands are where collapse is incomplete collapsing, and the hills are the slowly diminishing remains of the primigenial surface.
