= Sara Minkara =

Lebanese-America inclusion and disability expert

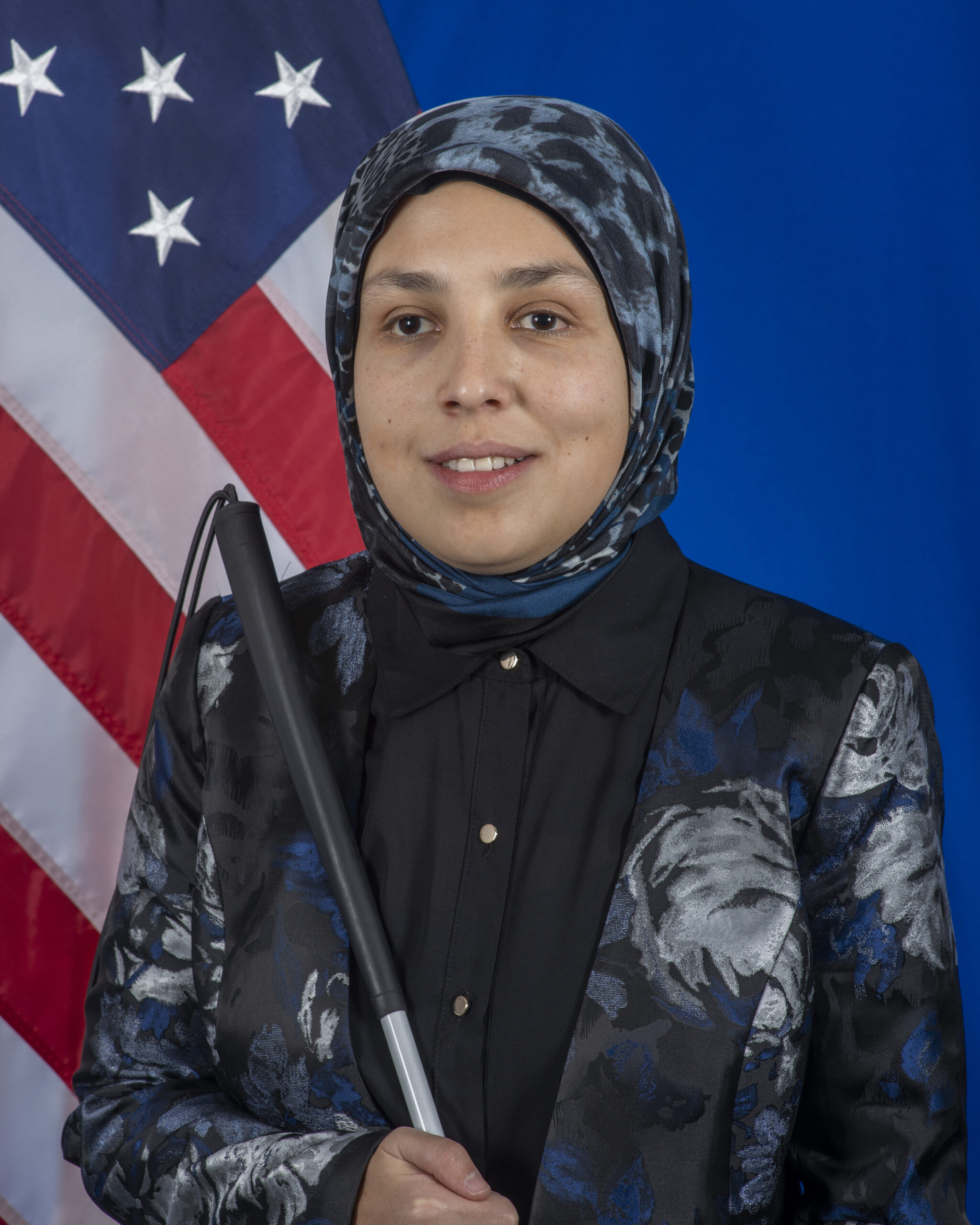

U.S Special Advisor on International Disability Rights in the U.S. Department of State
- In office October 28, 2021 – January 20, 2025
- President: Joe Biden
- Preceded by: Judith Heumann (2017)
- Succeeded by: Position abolished

Personal details
- Education: Harvard University; Wellesley College

Sara Minkara is a Lebanese-American inclusion and disability expert. She is a disability rights advocate who served as the United States Special Advisor on International Disability Rights in the U.S. Department of State.

== Personal life and education ==
Minkara is of Lebanese descent and is a first-generation immigrant American. A Muslim, Minkara became legally blind when she was seven years old. She received her Bachelor of Arts at Wellesley College and her Master of Public Policy at Harvard University.

Minkara's sister, Mona, is also legally blind. Mona Minkara is a scientist and advocate for the visually impaired.

== Career ==
Minkara founded the non-profit organization Empowerment Through Integration (ETI) and the company Sara Minkara LLC. ETI works with blind children, including refugees in Lebanon to help them build independence and learn life skills, like how to walk with a white cane or use a computer. ETI also runs a summer camp for both blind and sighted children that promotes social skills. Sara Minkara LLC is a consulting and advisory firm that promotes authentic leadership through customized services for clients around the world. She established ETI when she was an undergraduate student.

Minkara has been recognized by the Clinton Foundation's Clinton Global Initiative, and Forbes listed her in its Forbes 30 Under 30 list. In 2014–2015, she was a fellow at the Harvard University's Carr Center for Human Rights Policy and later a Dublin Fellow at John F. Kennedy School of Government at Harvard University. She was also a Halycon fellow, an Echoing Green fellow, the recipient of the Emily Bultch Peace and Justice Award, and MIT IDEAS Award, and a Harvard Emerging Leader.

Minkara was a subject of the documentary "Losing Sight, But Gaining a Vision." The film, produced by Harvard graduate Gloria Hong, won the Grand Jury Prize at the 2015 Girls Impact the World Film Festival.

On October 28, 2021, United States President Joe Biden appointed Sara Minkara as the United States Special Advisor on International Disability Rights at the State Department. The position was established by President Barack Obama in 2010 but was not filled during the first Donald Trump presidency.

Diplomatic posts	Vacant Title last held by Judith Heumann; 2017	Special Advisor for International Disability Rights; 2021–2025	Vacant
