= Nicole Joseph-Chin =

Trinidadian businesswoman

Nicole Joseph-Chin is the chief innovator, founder and CEO of Ms. Brafit™; a social enterprise in Trinidad who focused on healthy breasts as a catalyst for social impact.

She is a Vital Voices #VV100 Women and 2015 Vital Voices VV Lead Fellow. She participated in several VV leadership and mentoring programs between 2015 and 2021.

== Career ==
Joseph-Chin worked in the banking and financial services industry before creating Ms. Brafit™ in 2002.

She is a 2011 alumna of the US State Department IVLP. She has conducted seminars and workshops globally and has been hosted for speaking engagements about breast health, accurate fitting of bras, mastectomy care, social entrepreneurship, economic empowerment, and innovative thinking.

She was one of the Inaugural Founders elected TT Executive Director of the Women's Entrepreneurial Network of the Caribbean (an initiative of the US State Department) in 2013 and served as a regional board member until 2016.

In 2014, she pioneered the MOOC Camp series at the US Embassy in Port of Spain and in the same year, provided facilitation for a workshop on Innovative Thinking for the CARIRI Business Bootcamp series.

Joseph-Chin has designed breast-care, prevention, awareness and survivorship tools, including the "Treatment Companion", a journal that encourages women to store their medical records in a transportable and attractive package as well as the "Pink Slip Project", "Beauty Beyond the Bruises". In October 2016 Joseph-Chin introduced the global and multi-lingual breast care awareness campaign "The Gesture That Saves" - in San Francisco California to 100 global peers from 40 countries during the VV100 retreat.

Joseph-Chin has designed a comprehensive breast-care solutions toolkit and in 2016 was working on a design for a reproductive-health advocacy program.
