= Inna Bulkina =

Ukrainian literary critic, writer, and editor (1963–2021)

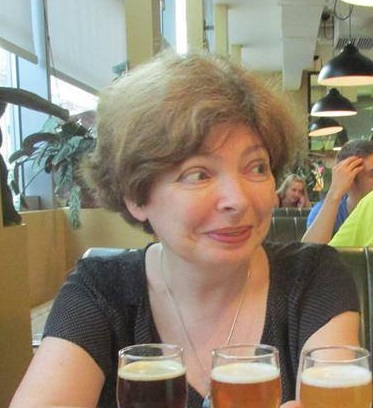
- Born: Inna Semenivna Bulkina; 12 November 1963; Kiev, Ukrainian SSR, Soviet Union
- Died: 20 January 2021 (aged 57); Kyiv, Ukraine
- Education: University of Tartu (PhD)

Inna Semenivna Bulkina (Ukrainian: Інна Семенівна Булкіна; 12 November 1963 – 20 January 2021) was a Ukrainian literary critic, writer and editor.

== Biography ==
Bulkina was born on 12 November 1963 in the city of Kiev, Ukrainian SSR.

In the 1980s, she attended the University of Tartu in the Estonian SSR. Her master's thesis was titled "Авторские сборники Е.А.Баратынского на фоне традиции русского поэтического сборника первой половины XIX века" (English: "Author's collections of EA Baratynsky against the background of the tradition of the Russian poetry collection of the first half of the XIX century"), which she defended in 1993. Her doctoral dissertation was titled "Киев в русской литературе первой трети XIX века" (English: "Kyiv in Russian literature during the first third of the XIX century"), and she graduated with a PhD from the University of Tartu.

Bulkina studied 19th-century Russian poetry and Soviet and post-Soviet culture in Russia and Ukraine. She later worked at the Pushkin Museum in Kyiv and was a researcher at the Institute of Cultural Policy at the Ukrainian Center for Cultural Studies.

She was a columnist for the Russian Journal, as well as a writer for various magazines and websites. She contributed to the print magazines and journals Banner, New World, and New Literary Review as well as the online magazines, Daily Magazine, Гефтер (gefter.ru), and Russian Magazine. Her writing focused on literature and socio-political topics, including on Kyiv's place in Russian and Ukrainian culture, the Russian war against Ukraine, and modern Ukrainian literature.

Bulkina was the author of the project "Magazine Pulp", and compiled the anthologies Киев. Фотографии на память (English: Kyiv. Photographs in Memory) and Киев в русской поэзии (English: Kyiv in Russian Poetry) and the poetry collection Числа (English: Numbers).

Bulkina died unexpectedly in Kyiv on 20 January 2021.
