= List of disability organizations =

This is a list of disability organizations, including advocacy groups and charities that provide services to people with disabilities.

== Organizations ==
=== A ===
- Action Deaf Youth
- ADAPT
- American Association on Intellectual and Developmental Disabilities (AAIDD) (1876) – AAIDD are promoters for people with intellectual and developmental disabilities.
- American Association of People with Disabilities (AAPD) (1995) – a cross-disability organization that focuses on advocacy and services.
- American Coalition of Citizens with Disabilities (ACCD) (1975) – coalition of local, state and national disability organizations.
- American Council of the Blind (ACB) – represents a diverse range of groups within the blind community.
- American Diabetes Association (ADA) (1939) – educates the public about diabetes.
- American Foundation for the Blind (1921) – primarily serves the blind population and focuses on advocacy and services.
- The Arc of the United States – A national organization serving people with intellectual and developmental disabilities.
- ARC Association for Real Change (1976) – supports the providers of the individuals with learning disabilities.
- Aspies For Freedom (AFF) – Raises public awareness for autism.
- Autism Network International (ANI) (1992) – Advocacy and self-help for autistic people.
- Autistic Self Advocacy Network (ASAN) (2006) – Advocacy to empower autistic people worldwide.

=== B ===
- Burton Blatt Institute (BBI) – Advance the civic, economic, and social participation of persons with disabilities in a global society.
- Best Buddies International (BBI) – create opportunities for people with intellectual and developmental disabilities to make friends.
- British Columbia Aboriginal Network on Disability Society (BCANDS) - Canadian Indigenous cross disability organization

=== C ===
- Canadian National Institute for the Blind (CNIB) (1918) – Volunteer organization dedicated to assisting Canadians who are blind.
- Catalan Association for the Blind and Visually Impaired (1993) – Helps support blind and visually impaired in everyday life.
- Center for Independent Living (1972)
- Community Alliance for the Ethical Treatment of Youth
- Community Options (1989)
- Council of Autism Service Providers
- Council of Parent Attorneys and Advocates

=== D ===
- Disability Rights Commission
- Disability Rights Education & Defense Fund (1979)
- Disability Rights UK
- Disabled American Veterans
- Disabled Children's Computer Group
- Disabled in Action (1970)
- Disabled Peoples' International
- Disability Rights Wisconsin (1977)
- DisAbled Women's Network Canada

=== E-H ===
- Easter Seals (1916) – an international organization that provides services, education, outreach, and advocacy so that people living with autism and other disabilities can live, learn, work, and play in their communities.
- Enabling Unit – It ensures affirmative action's concerning persons with disabilities at University College of Medical Sciences, Delhi and is a first such unit for students with disabilities in any medical institution in India.
- Endeavour
- Equal Employment Opportunity Commission
- FAIDD (The Finnish Association on Intellectual and Developmental Disabilities)
- Friends of Children with Special Needs (FCSN) (1996) – American nonprofit organization based in Fremont, California providing Independent living, Supported living, Day programs, Day camp programs, and After-school activities for adults and youth with developmental disabilities.
- Foundation for Active Rehabilitation
- Galloway's Society for the Blind
- Holistic Futures – an Victoria organization that provides NDIS-funded support services, including therapy, capacity building, and community-based programs for individuals with disabilities and their families.
- Unitylift – an Australian disability support provider and registered NDIS provider operating in New South Wales and Victoria.

=== I-K ===
- IDIRIYA – not-for-profit Sri Lankan NGO promoting "Accessibility at Public Buildings and Facilities" and focusing on "Accessible Tourism for All".
- Inclusion Europe - A European charity representing 20 million people with intellectual disabilities and their families.
- Infinite Ability – a special interest group within the Medical Humanities Group of University College of Medical Sciences, Delhi, India.
- International Association of Accessibility Professionals
- International Blind Sports Federation
- International Disability and Development Consortium (IDDC)
- International Ventilator Users Network
- Kupenda for the Children

=== L ===
- L'Arche
- Latvian Association for Support of Disabled People
- Little People of America – the national organization for people with skeletal dysplasias that result in short stature.

=== M ===
- March of Dimes Canada
- Mind (The National Association for Mental Health, UK)
- MindFreedom International (1990)
- Movement for the Intellectually Disabled of Singapore (MINDS)
- Muscular Dystrophy Association

=== N-O ===
- National Alliance on Mental Illness
- National Association of the Deaf (1880) – an American organization that primarily serves the Deaf population and focuses on advocacy and services.
- National Autistic Society
- National Disabled Women's Educational Equity Project
- National Down Syndrome Congress (1973) – a national (American) not-for-profit organization that provides individuals, families, and health care providers information and support about Down syndrome.
- National Federation of the Blind
- National Spinal Cord Injury Association
- NeuroConvergences (2024) - a French association loi 1901 focused on neurodivergent self-advocacy and systemic action.

=== P-Q ===
- People with Disability Australia
- Post-Polio Health International

=== R ===
- Rehabilitation International
- RespectAbility
- RNIB (The Royal National Institute of Blind People)
- RNID (The Royal National Institute for Deaf People)

=== S ===
- Scope
- Slovenian Disability Rights Association
- Society for Disability Studies
- Spastic Society of Gurgaon (2007) – Indian Organization providing care to persons with cerebral palsy, intellectual disability, autism, multiple disabilities
- Special Hockey International
- Special Olympics
- Survivor Corps
- Students' Civil Liberties Union

=== T ===
- TASH
- Tourette Association of America – A national organization dedicated to the support of people living with Tourette Syndrome

=== U-Z ===
- United Cerebral Palsy
- United Spinal Association, formerly the Eastern Paralyzed Veterans Association
- Women with Disabilities Feminist Collective, Australian social support organization in the 1980s
- World Institute on Disability
- YAI, The National Institute For People With Disabilities Network (previously known as Young Adult Institute)

== See also ==
- Disability
- Disability rights movement
- Independent living
- List of disability rights activists
