= Center for Accessible Technology =

American nonprofit organization

The Center for Accessible Technology, formerly the Disabled Children's Computer Group (DCCG), was started in 1983 in El Cerrito, California, by several parents, educators, and assistive technology developers who felt that the new computer technology could assist children and adults with disabilities to speak, write, read, learn, and participate in a larger world. The founding parents, Jackie and Steve Brand, wanted to find tools that their seven-year-old daughter, Shoshana, could use, as her fine motor coordination and vision were both impaired. Steve took a sabbatical from his teaching job at Berkeley High School to explore the emerging technologies. A friend, Steve Gensler of Unicorn Engineering (later known as IntelliTools) had developed a large flat keyboard alternative. Arjan Khalsa, who later became President of Unicorn, was also involved from the beginning.

When Steve and Jackie had found some answers, they felt it was natural to share what they had learned with other parents and teachers. They organized a community meeting in Berkeley which was attended by over one hundred parents, teachers, computer buffs, and adults with disabilities. The West Contra Costa Unified School District provided classroom space for the new organization, which received non-profit status in 1985. Parents from around the country began to contact the group and Apple Computer came on board as an early sponsor. The original Apple IIe had the ability to speak text aloud, when paired with an Echo Speech Synthesizer and software from UCLA.

Founding Board members also included Linda DeLucchi and Larry Malone, of the Center for Multi-Sensory Learning at the Lawrence Hall of Science. They served the organization from 1985 to 2002, while developing accessible hands-on science curriculum and FOSS - Full-Option Science System.

Jackie Brand served as executive director of DCCG until 1989. She was joined by Associate Director Mary Lester, who served from 1986 to 1995. Jackie went on to found the Alliance for Technology Access (first known at the National Special Education Alliance and a.k.a. the Foundation for Technology Access) which supported the creation and growth of a network of 40 centers around the country, based on the DCCG model. Jackie Brand has received numerous honors for her pioneering work in the field of assistive technology advocacy. She is a powerful spokesperson for the power of technology in the lives of people with disabilities, at conference, in videotapes made about DCCG, and in a PBS documentary, Freedom Machines. Mary Lester joined Jackie at the ATA in 1995 and served as the current executive director. The ATA effectively ceased operations by 2013 although a Facebook page remains.

DCCG became the Center for Accessible Technology in 1995. Lisa Wahl served as executive director from 1990 to 2000. During that time the Center greatly expanded services to schools, providing teacher training and consultant services for individual students. A certificate program with San Francisco State University provided indepth training for over 40 teachers from around the Bay and was replicated at the Computer Access Center in Los Angeles. The Center worked with a local company, InfoUse, to develop PlaneMath, web-based math curriculum that modeled accessibility and inspired youth with disabilities to think about careers in aviation, which was funded by NASA. They also partnered on the development of MathPad, software that was distributed by IntelliTools. The center received recognition from the California Speech Language and Hearing Association, and was named a Digital Pioneer in 1997 by KQED and San Francisco Sidewalk.

During the 1980s and 1990s, DCCG was unique due to the idea that successful implementation of assistive technology could not solely focus on the person with a disability but needed to include most everyone else in their life. For an augmentative communication device to provide speech, the parents, teachers, bus driver, siblings, and playmates of the user needed to be aware of it and to facilitate use of the device. The resulting message was that people with disabilities had something to say and something to contribute to our society, and that usage of assistive technology was what would make this possible.

The Center continues to provide assistive technology services including a large resource center in Berkeley, California. Dmitri Belser was the executive director from 2001-2021. During that time, the center continued to be active in the Ed Roberts Campus, a project dedicated to co-housing eight or more disability organizations in a facility constructed at the Ashby BART station.
