= Spastic Society of Gurgaon =

Organization based in India

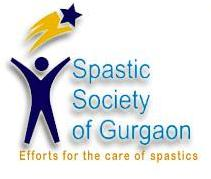
- Abbreviation: SSOG
- Formation: 2007
- Founder: Rajesh Bhola
- Type: NGO
- Legal status: Organization working in disability
- Purpose: Care of persons with cerebral palsy, intellectual disability, autism, multiple disabilities
- Headquarters: Sector 4, Gurgaon, Haryana, India
- Location: Gurgaon
- Services: Occupational therapy, Counseling, Vocational training, Psychotherapy, Imparting counseling to guardians, Multiple single window services, Assistance in issuance of disability certificates, NIRAMAYA cashless insurance cards, Medical check ups, Distribution of medicines and medical aids, etc.
- Members: NGO Member, Local Level Committee (LLC) Gurgaon appointed by Ministry of Social Justice and Empowerment, Government of India.
- Website: http://ssog.in

Spastic Society of Gurgaon (SSOG) is an organization in Haryana, India that provides programs related to occupational therapy, counseling, vocational training, and psychotherapy for children with autism, cerebral palsy, intellectual disability, and multiple disabilities. It is India's first non-profit disability sector organization to receive ISO certification by United Kingdom Accreditation Service: United Registrar of Systems for quality of services rendered by it. SSOG also imparts counseling and psychotherapy to the parents and guardians of disabled children. Mass camps are organized for the welfare of children with disabilities. Multiple single-window services like assistance in issuance of disability certificates; NIRAMAYA cashless insurance cards; medical check-ups; distribution of medicines; and medical aids are rendered to disabled people in such camps. Being sponsored by the Haryana Government, SSOG undertakes disability audits of organizations to assess their accessibility compliance.

SSOG was founded by Rajesh Bhola in partnership with other eminent doctors and social workers drawn from multiple super specialty fields. Rajesh Bhola has worked in disability advocacy and accessibility since 1985 and was the main person behind formation of the Society. He currently serves as its president. Bola completed his post-graduation degree in English Literature with Linguistics from Punjab University Chandigarh. Later, he completed his PhD in English Literature. He is an Indian spiritual writer and authors a weekly spiritual column in Friday Gurgaon. Bola also contributes articles to Hindustan Times Inner Voice and blogs to The Speaking Tree of The Times of India.

== History ==
Spastic Society of Gurgaon aims to address the welfare of spastic children in Gurgaon, NCR, and Haryana. This includes coordinating across various agencies, social works, professionals, and infrastructure providers to arrange for long-term care of such children and to help their parents live life fully, purposefully and contentedly by bringing them closer to each other, by creating coordination between various agencies, social workers, professionals and infra-structure providers. Efforts are also being initiated to make environment of Gurgaon, the millennium city of India, more spastic friendly.

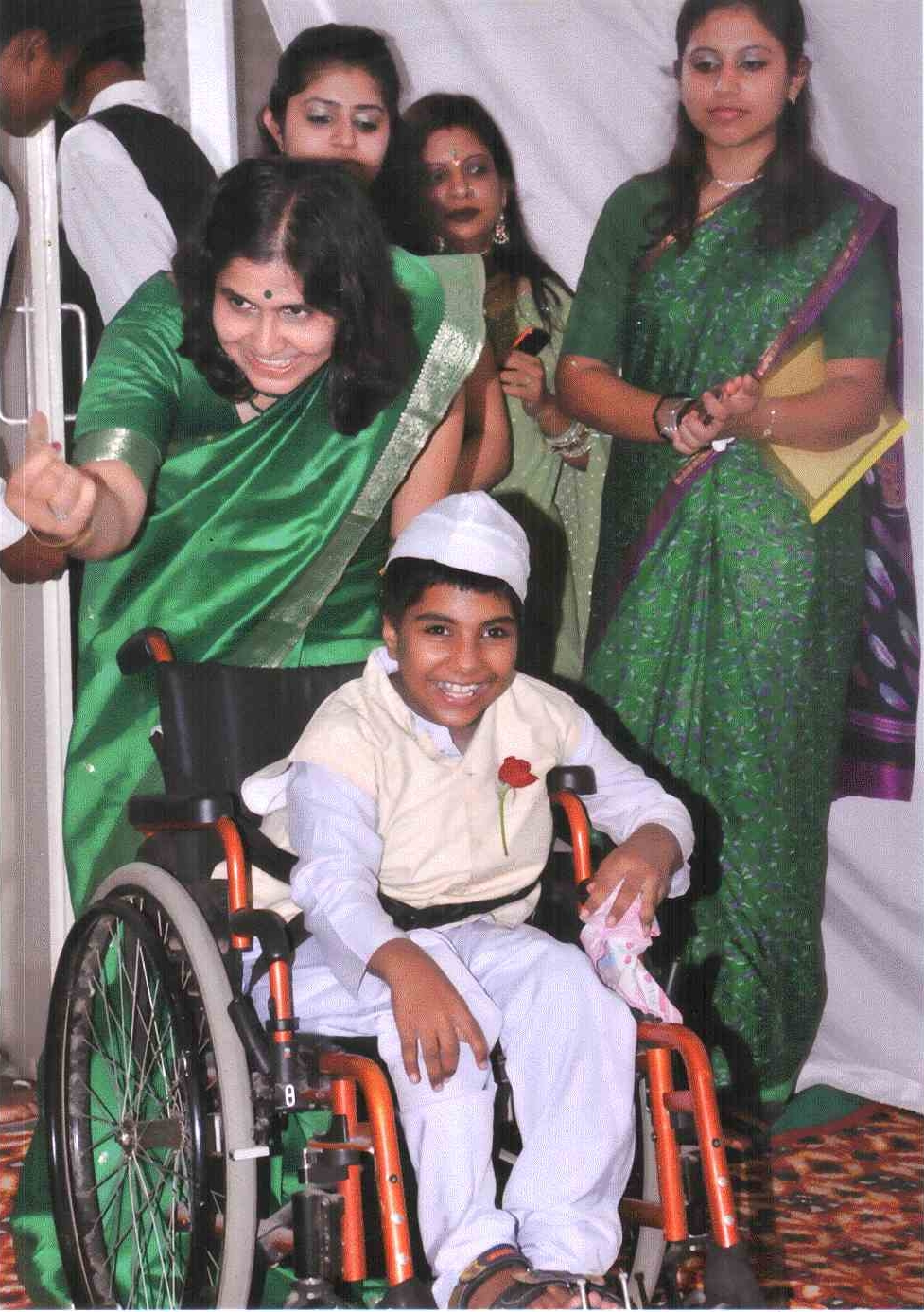
A cerebral palsy child being felicitated in a function

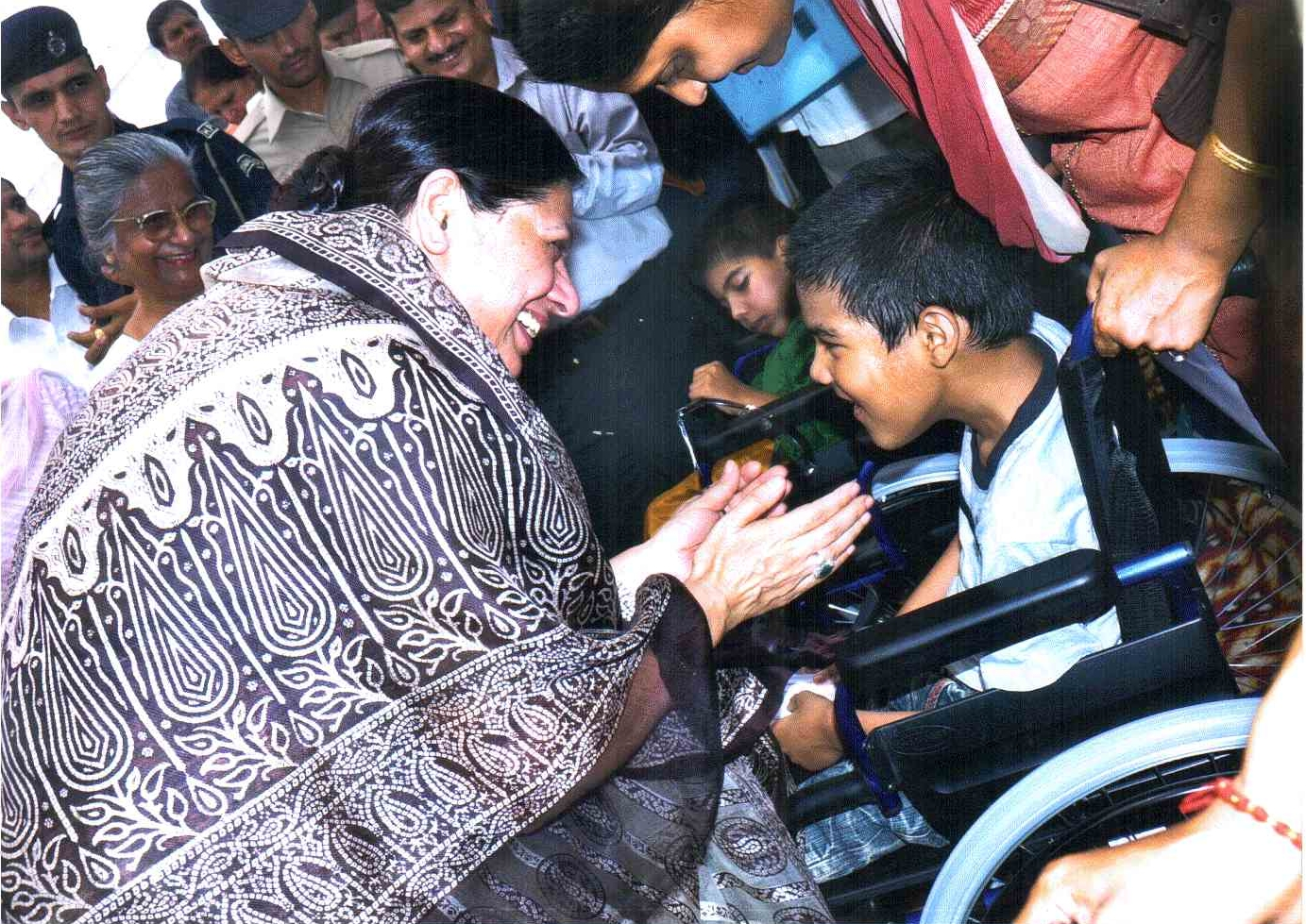
Asha Hooda wife of Bhupinder Singh Hooda at SSOG for inauguration

== Activities ==
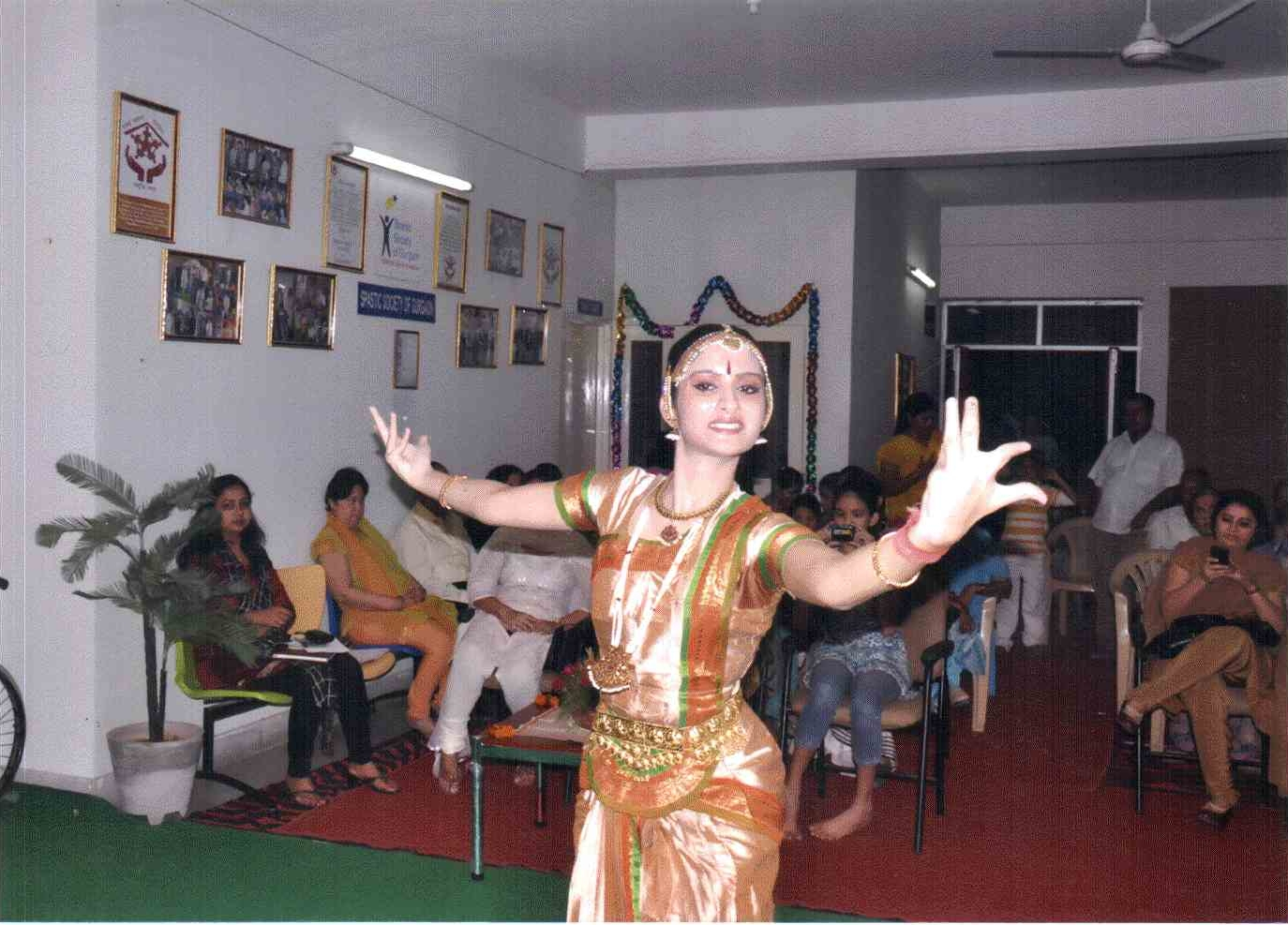
Ila Gokarn performing Bharatnatyam at SSOG rehab centre

Services being rendered by SSOG through two separate delivery channels are the Center for Special Children and the Center for Physiotherapy for Senior Citizens. All the services rendered at the Center for Special Children are free of cost. It was established to expedite provision of disability certificates and as a single-window service to assist disabled persons in obtaining benefits from the state and central governments. SSOG has been appointed as NGO Member of Local Level Committee (LLC) Gurgaon by Ministry of Social Justice and Empowerment, Government of India. As part of rehabilitation, the specially challenged persons are kept in the mainstream and looked after for their emotional needs as well. Music and entertainment is part of rehab. Many noted persons from music, art, craft and drama fields often meet such children during interactive sessions with guardians of such children. Ila Gokarn is one of the young Bharatnatyam exponents who performed at Spastic Society of Gurgaon.

== Managing disability ==
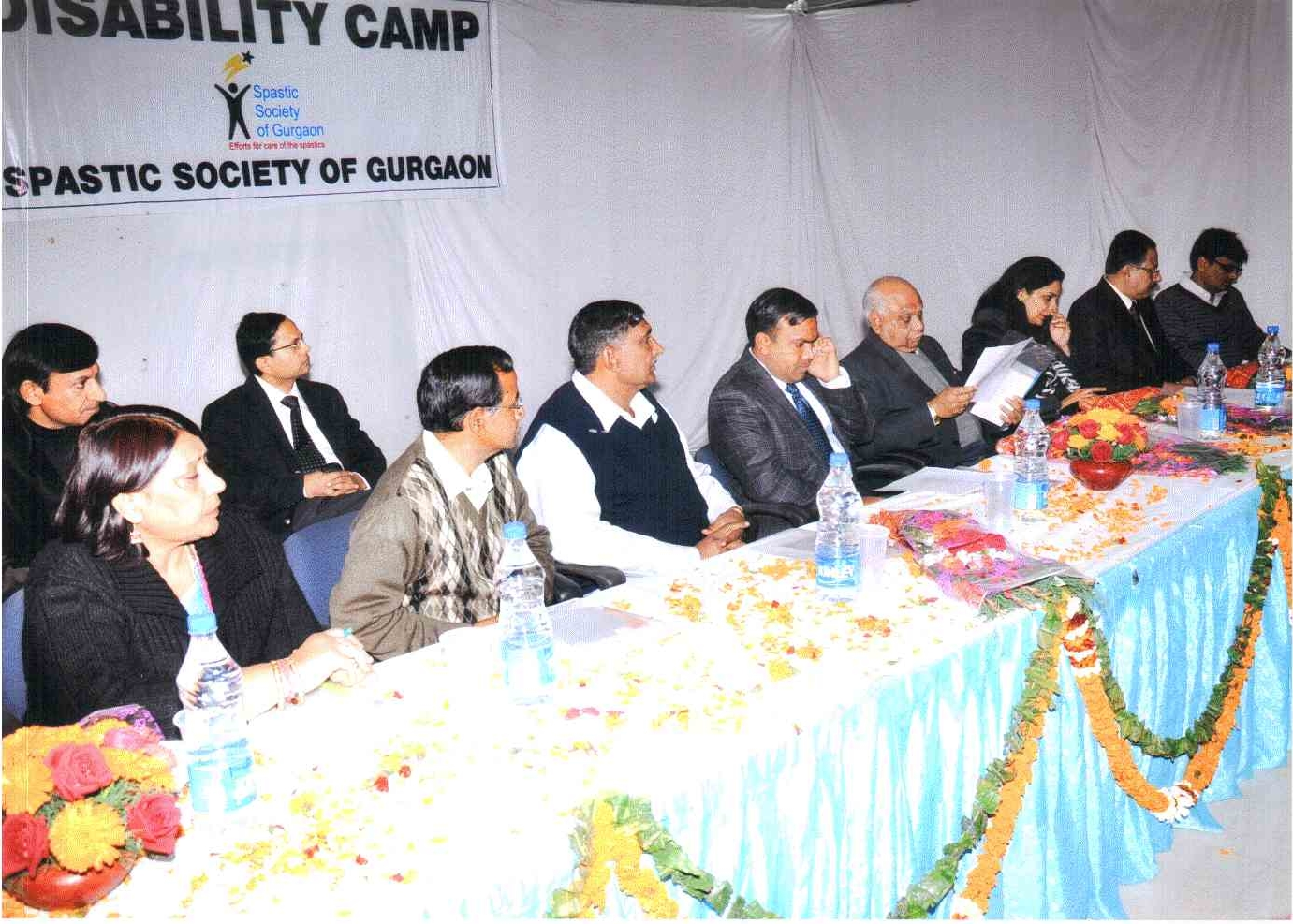
Disability camp organized by SSOG at Civil Hospital, Gurgaon for mass coverage of the disabled

Each person with cerebral palsy has different strengths and difficulties. Most children with cerebral palsy need ongoing help with daily care and long-term care. While mastering specific skills is an important focus of treatment on a day-to-day basis, the ultimate goal is to help children grow into adulthood with as much independence as possible. Depending on their physical and intellectual abilities, adults with cerebral palsy need help finding attendants to care for them, a place to live, a job, and reliable transportation. SSOG coordinates with professional carers and encourages partnerships between parents and these professionals. Government of India provides assistance to poor disabled children through disability camps for single-window delivery of many facilities, including medical check-ups, NIRAMAYA health cards, and employment opportunities. Such camps are organized with the support of the local deputy commissioner and the chief medical officer of the concerned district.

== Spreading awareness about risk factors ==
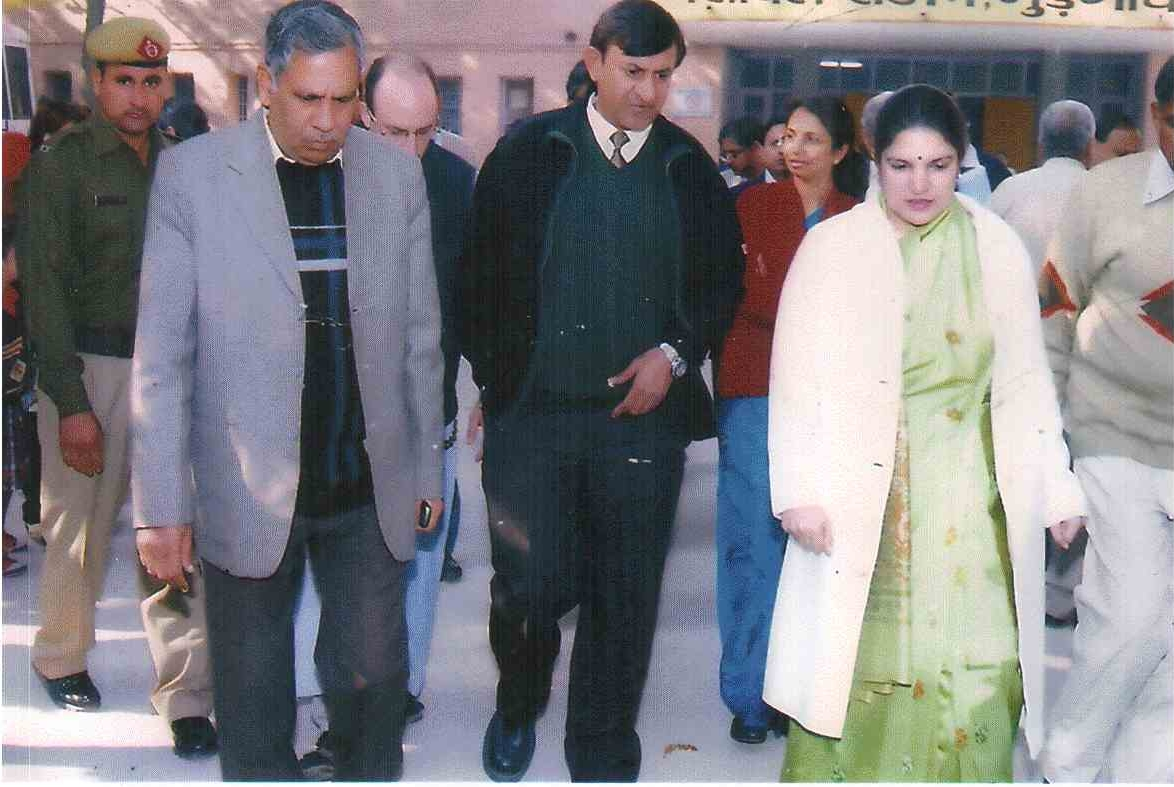
Deputy Commissioner, Chief Medical Officer of Gurgaon and Rajesh Bhola at Disability Camp organized by SSOG

Despite advancements made in the field of medicine and allied fields, the exact cause of cerebral palsy remains unclear. About 50% of all children who develop cerebral palsy were born prematurely. Premature infants are at higher risk because their organs are not yet fully developed, increasing the risk of asphyxia and other injury to the brain. Some other causes of cerebral palsy are asphyxia, hypoxia of the brain, birth trauma, premature birth, multiple birth and certain infections in the mother during and before birth. Other major cause of cerebral palsy after birth in developing nations like India is medical neglect. Many signboards and other visual materials are displayed at prominent places for spreading awareness amongst people about precautions to be taken at prenatal, at time of delivery and at post natal levels to avoid incidence of deformities.

== Symptom management ==
Cerebral palsy was first identified by English surgeon William Little in 1860 who raised the possibility of asphyxia during birth as a chief cause of the disorder. In 1897, Sigmund Freud, the famous psychoanalyst, suggested that a difficult birth was not the cause but only a symptom of other effects on fetal development. All types of cerebral palsy are characterized by abnormal muscle tone, posture reflexes, motor development, and coordination. The main symptoms are problem with balance, involuntary movements, and scissor making. On the whole, cerebral palsy symptoms are very diverse and different in each case of cerebral palsy. The effects of cerebral palsy fall on a continuum of motor dysfunction, which makes coordinated movement almost impossible. In case of delayed milestones, the parents need to approach for medical guidance and complete medical diagnosis and analysis. Noninvasive rehabilitation procedures are the only methods for enabling persons with cerebral palsy to lead their lives to the best possible ways. SSOG is spreading this message through their medical specialists in the field to major hospitals for early diagnosis.

== Inclusive care ==
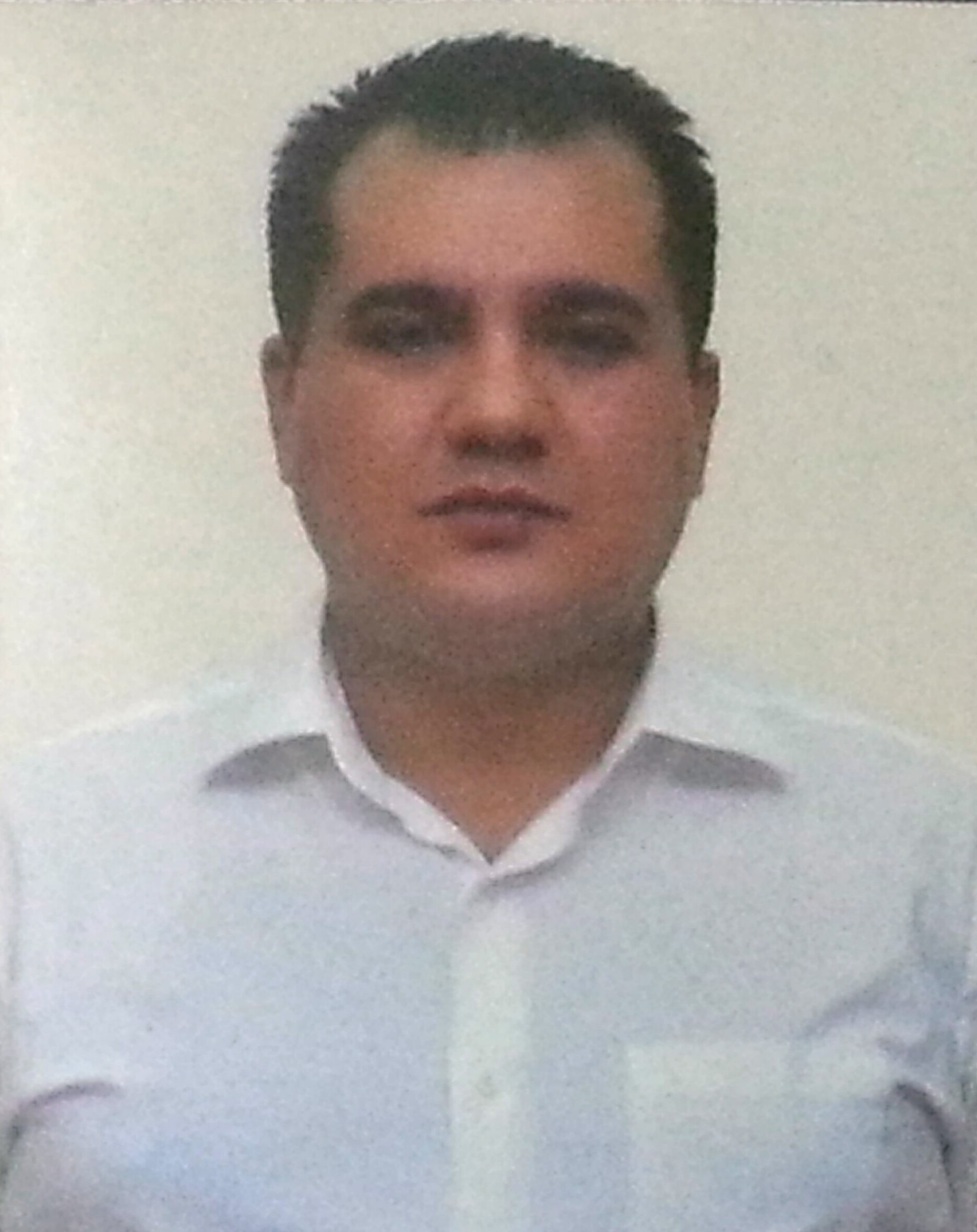
Shekhar Vidyarathi, Deputy Commissioner, Gurgaon

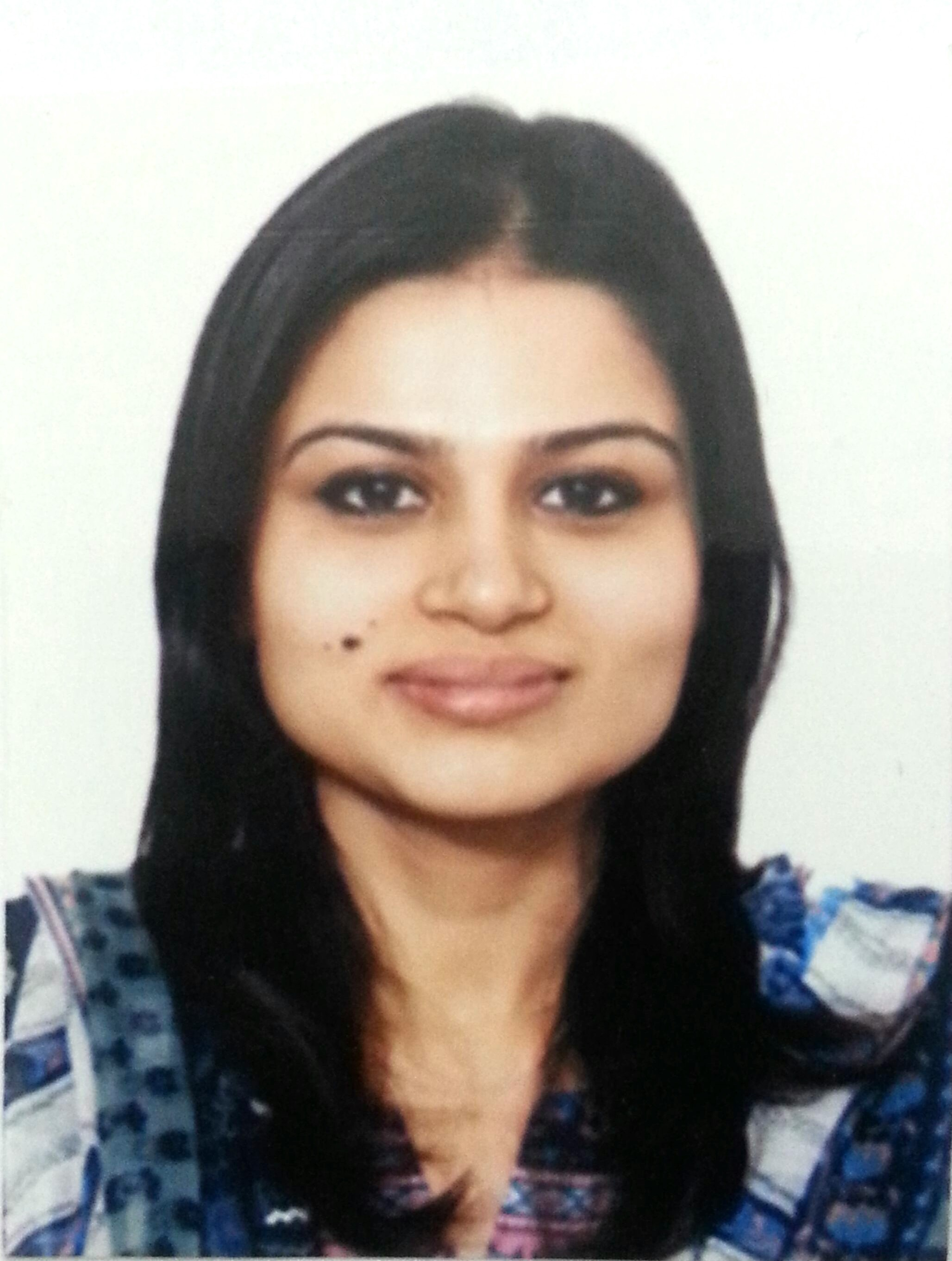
Ekta Chopra, City Magistrate, Gurgaon

A role has been played by Shekhar Vidyarathi, Deputy Commissioner, Gurgaon and his administration aide Ekta Chopra, City Magistrate, Gurgaon in understanding the needs of disabled people and empathizing with the physical constraints they confront in course of their daily lives. Both Vidyarathi and Chopra proved instrumental in amelioration of the lot of disabled people. Shekhar Vidyarathi was clear in his objectives regarding managing disability when he said: "The overall goal for ongoing care of individuals with cerebral palsy is to help them reach their physical, mental and emotional potential. Generally this includes living as much as possible in the mainstream of their society and culture. People with cerebral palsy tend to be happiest when they go to school with, live with and work with their peers. They also love to be listened to and caressed."

Ekta Chopra, City Magistrate, Gurgaon feels the greatest pain when a child with disability is denied admission to a school in Gurgaon. The children with disability have the right to go to mainstream schools, where teachers can be imparted training regarding the different teaching techniques and adaptations which can be provided. Child centric teaching methods will help these children and promote inclusion.

Shekhar Vidyarathi encourages more people to volunteer, as people associated with such spastic or severely disabled children are more spiritually inclined and have a higher level of consciousness.

== Welfare for the disabled ==
A Local Level Committee (LLC) has been set up by the Ministry of Social Justice and Empowerment in every district in India, to monitor and govern issues related to disability. An LLC constituting the Deputy Commissioner of the district and an NGO working in the field of disability looks after matters related to welfare, rehabilitation, medical care, special education and legal guardianship of persons with disabilities. In Gurgaon, the LLC constitutes the Deputy Commissioner and the Spastic Society of Gurgaon. Some important decisions have recently been taken for the welfare of persons with disabilities - particularly those with mental disabilities, in Gurgaon - in an LLC meeting attended by Deputy Commissioner Shekhar Vidyarathi, Dr. Rajesh Bhola, President, Spastic Society of Gurgaon and City Magistrate Ms. Ekta Chopra.

1. A basic criterion for the issuance of Guardianship Certificates has been relaxed. Now, even those parents (of disabled children) who have migrated to Gurgaon from other cities, and who have stayed in Gurgaon for less than 10 years, will be considered for issuance of Guardianship Certificates, provided the applicants produce the address and identity proofs to the satisfaction of the competent authorities.

2. A disability camp will shortly be organised at the premises of the Spastic Society of Gurgaon, Old Age Home, Sector 4, for the delivery of single window services to disabled people. Rajesh Bhola will co-ordinate for the same with the Chief Medical Officer, Primary Health Officer and the Disability Liaison Officer at the Civil Hospital.

3. All the major hospitals of Gurgaon have been advised to display an essential signboard (as per a specified content and design), which would help spread awareness on 'How to prevent Disability'. The signboard would be positioned near the gynecological departments and neonatal nurseries. The lack of knowledge on the part of women, at the stages of pregnancy, delivery and child rearing, contributes significantly to the problem of disability. Such signboards have already been displayed at the Civil Hospital, Bus Stand and Spastic Society of Gurgaon.

4. A camp for measles vaccination of disabled people, and for needy children, will be organised at the Spastic Society of Gurgaon premises before this month end.

== See also ==
- ADAPT – Able Disable All People Together
