= Indigenous Disability Awareness Month =

Annual Canadian / International Observance

Indigenous Disability Awareness Month (IDAM)
- Indigenous Disability Awareness Month Poster and Logo
- Observed by: Various Provinces, Communities, and Organizations in Canada, New Zealand, and Botswana
- Date: November
- Duration: 1 month
- Frequency: Annual

Indigenous Disability Awareness Month (IDAM; formerly Aboriginal Disability Awareness Month) is an annual Canadian observance created in 2015 by Indigenous Disability Canada / British Columbia Aboriginal Network on Disability Society (IDC/BCANDS) and is observed/recognized by various government, communities and organizations across Canada and internationally. Indigenous Disability Awareness Month is believed to be the only Indigenous disability-specific, recognized observance in the world.

== History ==
Indigenous Disability Awareness Month was created by Indigenous Disability Canada / British Columbia Aboriginal Network on Disability Society (IDC/BCANDS) in 2015, to raise awareness of the significant contributions that Indigenous peoples (First Nation, Inuit, Métis) with disabilities bring to communities across Canada. The awareness month also seeks to bring increased awareness regarding the unique barriers that Indigenous peoples with disabilities experience, which limit their ability to be active and included members within both Indigenous and non-Indigenous communities.

In early 2015, IDC/BCANDS began work on the development of Indigenous Disability Awareness Month, initially engaging the government of British Columbia, the First Nations Summit and the Métis Nation British Columbia for their endorsement and recognition of the Month. In the fall of 2015, the government of British Columbia officially proclaimed November as Indigenous Disability Awareness Month with the First Nation Summit and Métis Nation British Columbia both passing organizational resolutions officially recognizing and declaring the month annually.

In 2016, the Assembly of First Nations (AFN) officially recognized and proclaimed the month through a resolution passed at an AFN Chiefs Assembly, Additionally in 2016, the government of Saskatchewan officially recognized and declared the month as did the Yukon Council of First Nations.

In 2017, the United Nations Committee on the Rights of Persons with Disabilities in their Concluding Observations to Canada after Canada's initial review since its signing of the Convention on the Rights of Persons with Disabilities (CRPD), recommended to Canada to officially proclaim and recognize Indigenous Disability Awareness Month nationally on an annual basis.

In 2021, the government of Manitoba officially recognized and proclaimed the month, as did the Canadian Capital Cities of Victoria, Edmonton, Regina, St. John's, Halifax, Fredericton, Toronto and the Nation's Capital, Ottawa. In 2024, Alberta, became the fourth Canadian province to officially recognize and proclaim the month,.

Since its creation in 2015, hundreds of communities, organizations, and various notable persons have recognized the month. In 2020, 2021, and 2022, Canadian Prime Minister Justin Trudeau released a video in recognition of the month. Others recognizing and raising awareness on the month have included Marc Miller, federal Minister, Carla Qualtrough, federal Minister, Former British Columbia Premier John Horgan as well as members of Canadian Legislative Assemblies, the Canadian Senate and Members of Parliament.
