= Elyse Rosenbaum =

American electrical engineer

Elyse Rosenbaum is an American electrical engineer, the Melvin and Anne Louise Hassebrock Professor in Electrical and Computer Engineering at the University of Illinois Urbana-Champaign, and the director of the Center for Advanced Electronics through Machine Learning. Her research involves the reliability of integrated circuits, including modeling the effects of heat, electrostatic discharges, aging, and other forms of stress on semiconductor-based circuit components.

== Education and career ==
Rosenbaum earned a bachelor's degree from Cornell University and a master's degree from Stanford University, in 1984 and 1985 respectively, and became a researcher at Bell Labs. Returning to graduate study, she completed a Ph.D. in 1992 at the University of California, Berkeley. Her dissertation, Thin oxide reliability in integrated circuits, was supervised by Chenming Hu.

She has been a faculty member at the University of Illinois Urbana-Champaign since 1992, and was named Melvin and Anne Louise Hassebrock Professor in 2016.

== Recognition ==
Rosenbaum was named an IEEE Fellow in 2011, "for contributions to electrostatic discharge reliability of integrated circuits".

She received the Industry Pioneer Award in 2017, at the 39th Electrical Overstress/Electrostatic Discharge Symposium (EOS/ESD).
