= Friends of Children with Special Needs =

American nonprofit serving children and adults with developmental disabilities

- 華人特殊兒童之友
- Official logo

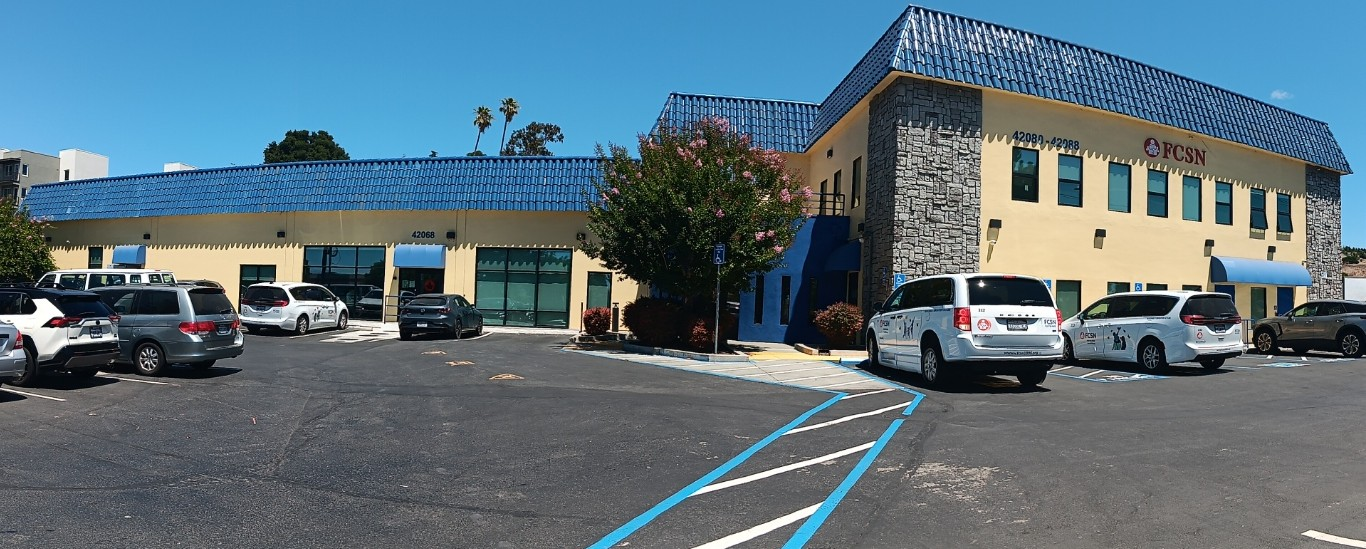
- FCSN current headquarters in Fremont, California, U.S.
- Formation: 1996; 30 years ago
- Founder: Albert Wang; Anna Wang
- Type: Nonprofit
- Tax ID no.: 77-0446853
- Legal status: 501(c)(3) nonprofit organization
- Headquarters: 42080 Osgood Road, Fremont, California, U.S.
- Locations: 3
- Coordinates: 37.5285041°N 121.9505797°W
- Region served: Alameda County, California; Santa Clara County, California
- Services: After-school activity; Day camp; Day programs; Independent living; Supported living
- Official language: English, Cantonese, Mandarin Chinese
- Co-President: CK Lee
- Co-Chairperson: James Chiao
- Vice President: Anna Wang
- Staff: 160 (2024)
- Award: Nonprofit of The Year (2025)
- Website: fcsn1996.org

Friends of Children with Special Needs
- Traditional Chinese: 華人特殊兒童之友
- Simplified Chinese: 华人特殊儿童之友
- Literal meaning: Friends of Chinese Children with Special Needs
Transcriptions
Standard Mandarin
- Hanyu Pinyin: Huárén tèshū értóng zhīyǒu
- Wade–Giles: Huárén tèshū értóng zhīyǒu
Yue: Cantonese
- Yale Romanization: wàajàn daksyù jìtùng zījáu
- Jyutping: waa4jan4 dak6syu4 ji4tung4 zi1jau5

Friends of Children with Special Needs (FCSN) (Traditional Chinese: 華人特殊兒童之友; Pinyin: Huárén tèshū értóng zhīyǒu) is an American nonprofit organization serving individuals with developmental disabilities (e.g. Autism, Cerebral palsy, Down syndrome, etc.) throughout Alameda County, California and Santa Clara County, California. FCSN offers independent living, supported living, and day programs for adult children, after-school and day camp programs for youth children, and support services for the children's parents. FCSN initially held its activities in borrowed spaces (i.e. "churches, living rooms, and YMCAs") due to not having a permanent headquarters throughout the first eight years since Incorporation, until 2006. Meetings, held by the organization, involved operations from both the special needs individuals and volunteers (including the children's parents).

== 1990s ==
In the early 1990s, support services for individuals with autism were scarce in the Silicon Valley. As a result, both Albert and Anna Wang were struggling to "deal with their [recently-diagnosed,] autistic son's behavior and communication challenges". According to Wang, Chinese and Chinese-Americans "placed great importance on being accomplished both in academic and career spheres" and indirectly see families of children with special needs as "fail[ure] to meet such criteria".

In 1993, an organized group of ten Chinese immigrant families with special needs children (including the co-founders Anna and Albert Wang) regularly met with a special education teacher because they, as Chinese people, often "face [shame] and stigma of having a child with developmental disabilities", need a forum to "vent their problems" and "share their anguish" about the parents' personal hardships of raising a child with special needs, and need to better advocate for their children when seeking help from school districts and government agencies. Wang elaborated to multiple news outlets about the shame and stigma by explaining that when parents gave birth to children with developmental disabilities, they and their family members may believe that "something wrong [was done]" during the pregnancy. In addition, Wang also remarked about parents feeling "depleted and isolated" due to the demanding work required to take care of their children, parents' fears of their children being institutionalized and jailed and that "remov[ing] people with special needs from society" was common not just in China but also amongst Chinese immigrants.

Wang believed that by offering programs specifically for these children, via FCSN, the special needs individuals would be able to "demonstrate the many capabilities that... children [with special needs] have".

== 2000s ==
In 2002, FCSN started an afterschool program in Fremont, California to help children with developmental disabilities "learn new skills and receive assistance".

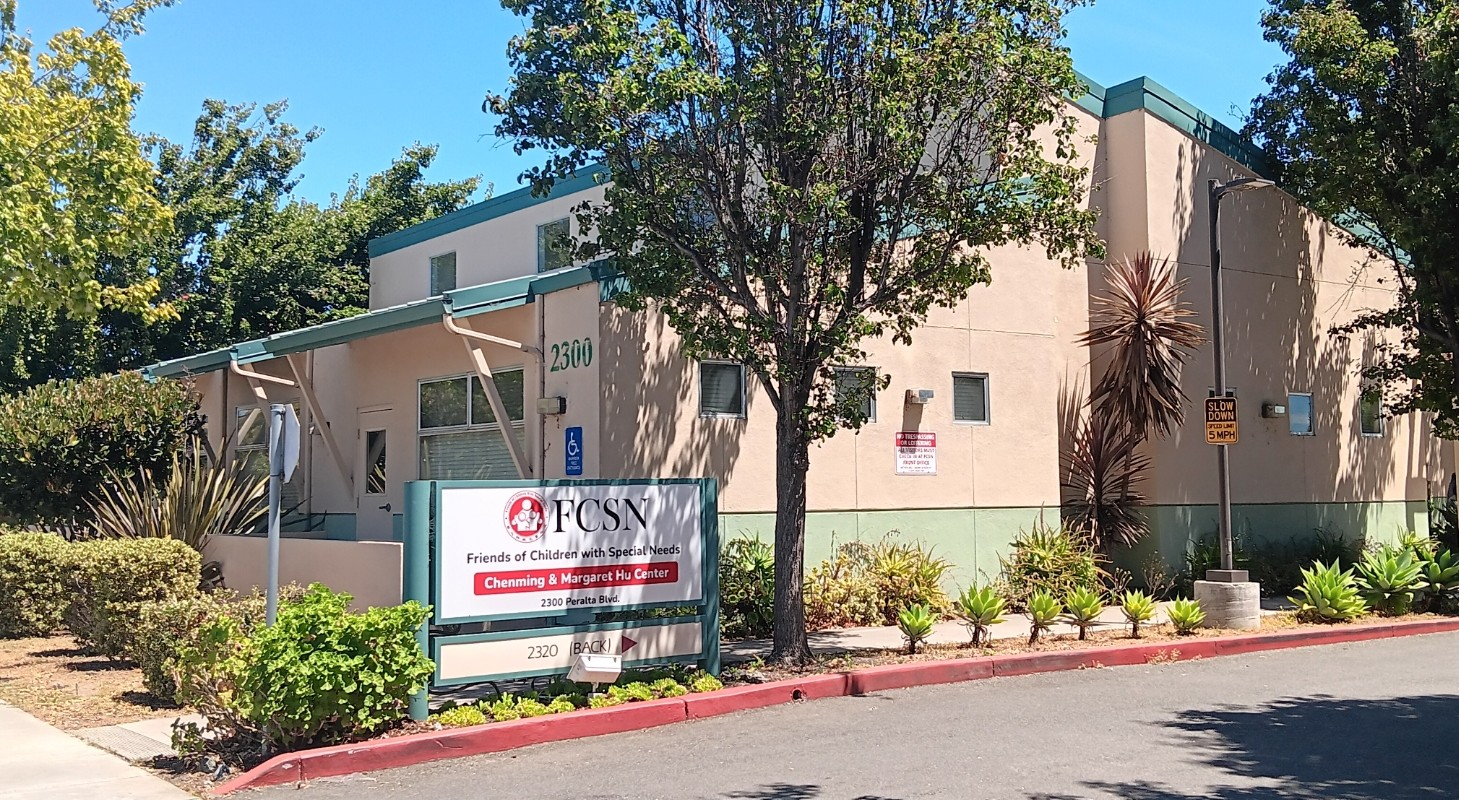
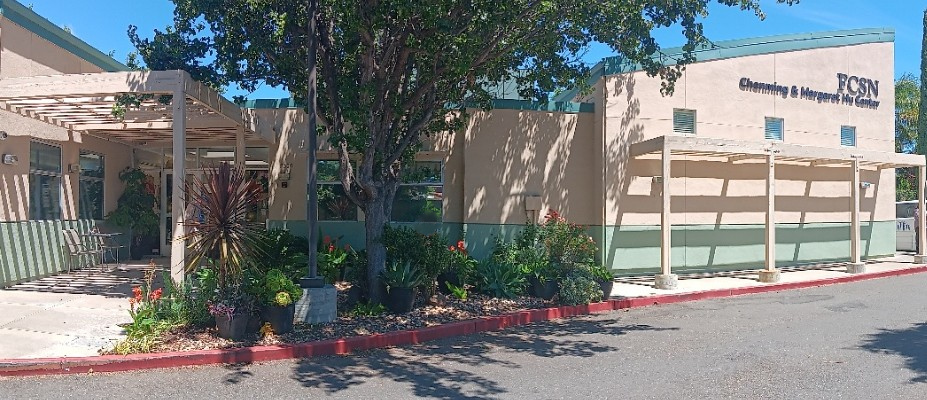
FCSN Dream Center and First Headquarters (nka Chenming & Margaret Hu Center) (2025)

The Dream Center was FCSN's first permanent headquarters located in the Parkmont neighborhood of Fremont, California. News outlets, like The Mercury News, referred to this building as the "only Chinese-centric, autistic-focused center". In 2000, FCSN started the planning and construction process. The 6,000 square-foot center would have "six classrooms, a resource library, a kitchen and a multipurpose room" that would offer the families' children "day programs, job training, and therapy classes and seminars for parents". In addition, the parcel would also include a "1,400-square-foot, two-story building with 10 four-bedroom apartments" to have care providers to help their clients and to allow their clients to live somewhat independently. Groundbreaking began in 2002. The construction costed a total of $2.5 million (most of which came from private donors from the Chinese American community). Construction was completed in 2004. In October 2006, FCSN held its grand opening.

In May 2004, FCSN along with several dozen parents rallied in front of the California State Capitol to protest California governor Arnold Schwarzenegger's proposed budget cuts on funding for families to pay for the "medical needs of children who are disabled".

In 2008, the organization expanded its operations in Santa Clara County by offering programs in the county's various cities such as Cupertino, Milpitas, Palo Alto, Saratoga, and San Jose because a significant amount of their clients reside there.

== 2010s ==
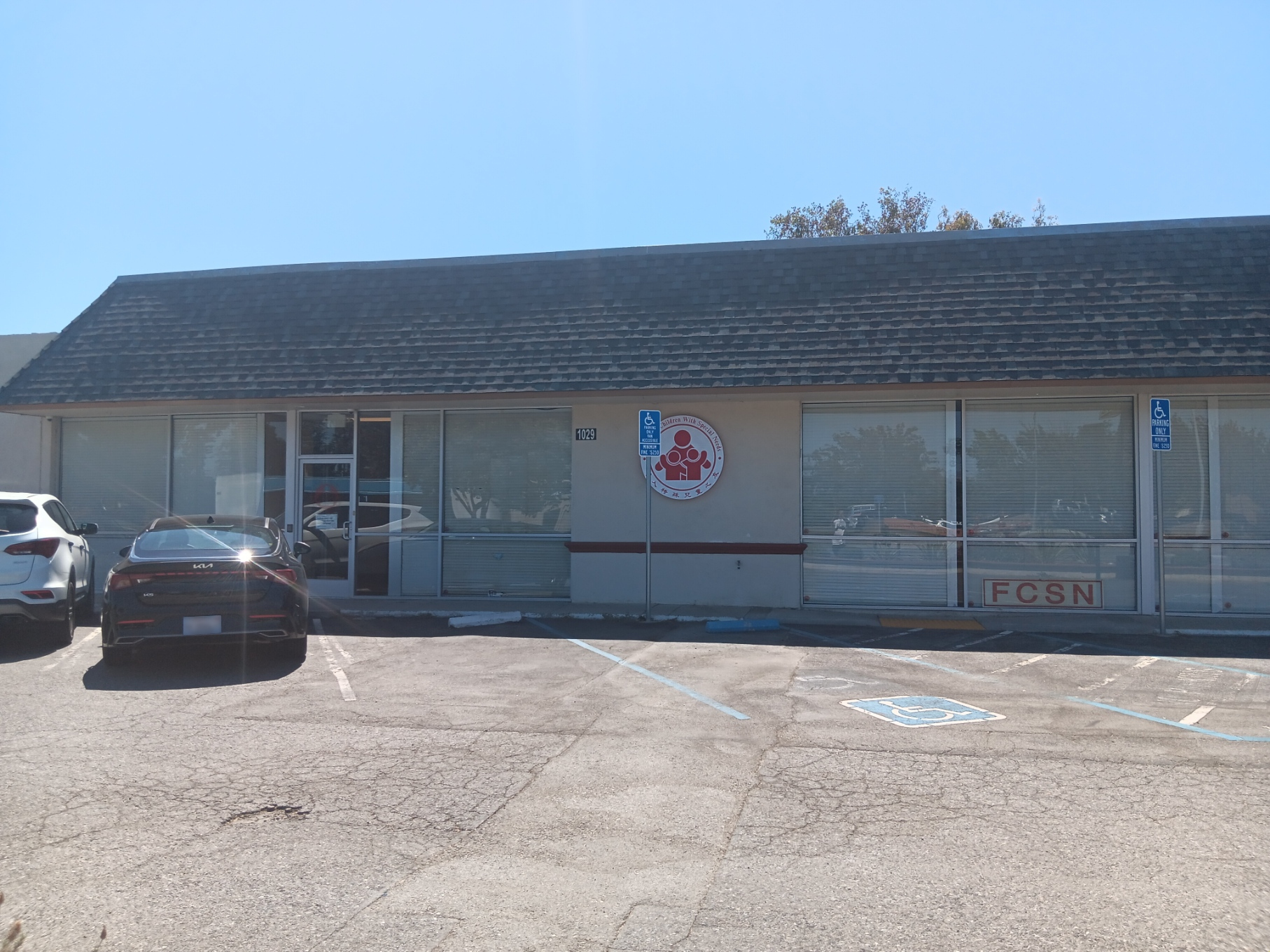
FCSN's San Jose Center (2025)

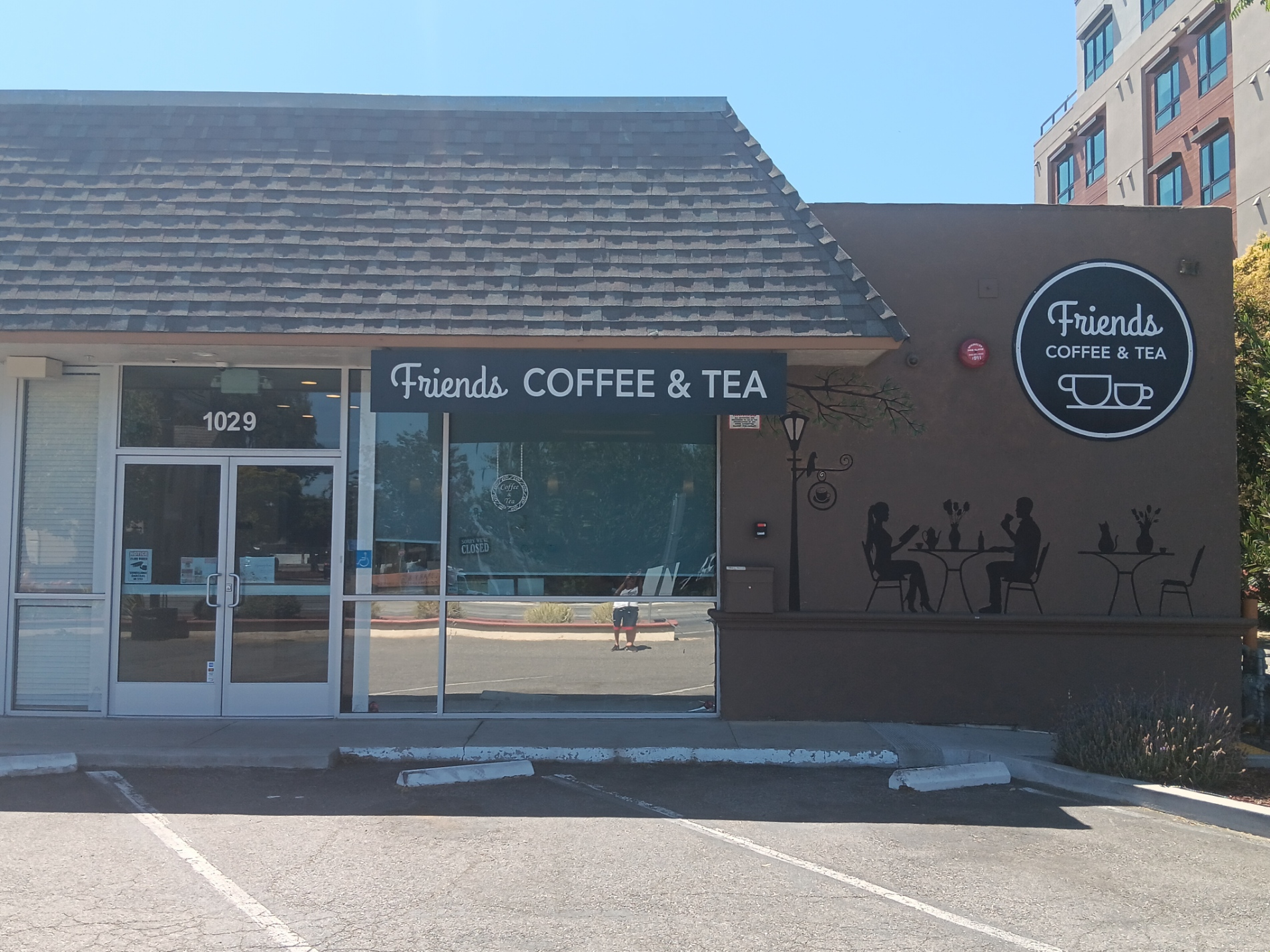
Friends Coffee and Tea (2025)

In 2014, FCSN held a Fundraising gala at the Santa Clara Convention Center with proceeds going towards opening a permanent location for their operations in Santa Clara County. In April 2017, FCSN held its grand opening for its 8,000 square-foot center located south of San Jose's Fruitdale neighborhood. In 2018, FCSN opened up a "Coffeehouse-Teahouse hybrid" restaurant next to its San Jose headquarters called "Friends Coffee and Tea" to give its clients a "self-esteem [boost] through work skill training, "to increase community awareness of people with special needs", and act as a training group "for employment at other cafes".

== 2020s ==
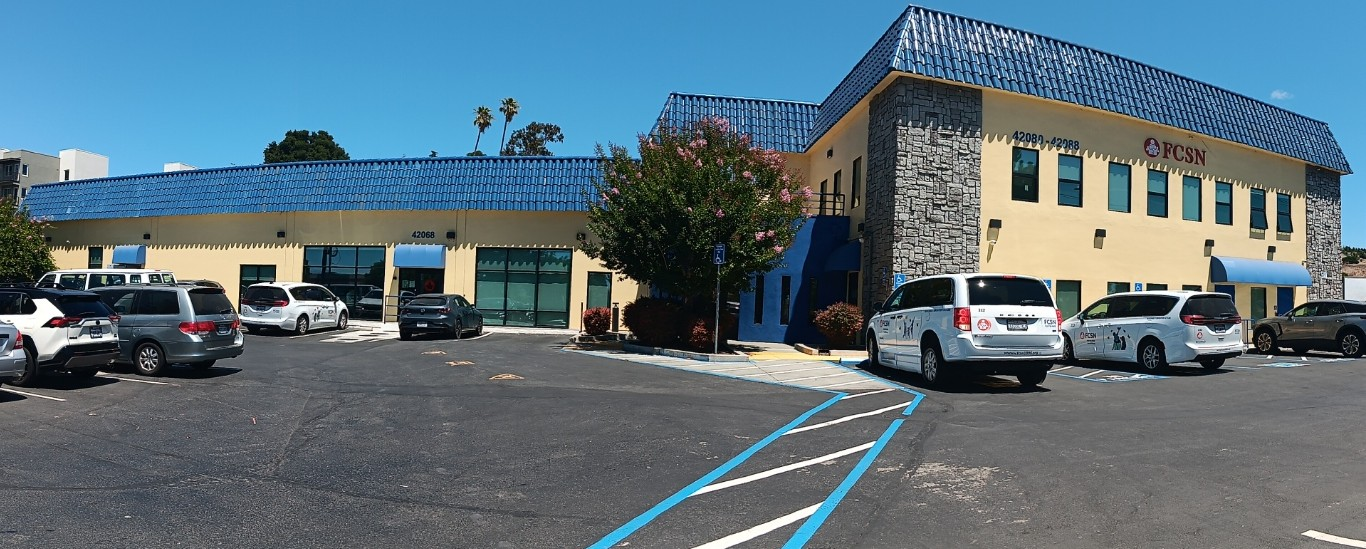
FCSN Current Headquarters (2025)

In Spring 2021, FCSN initiated its plans to move their headquarters to Fremont's Irvington community due to the "high demand for office and program spaces". In September 2022, FCSN held their first art exhibition at its new headquarters called "Through Our Eyes" to "provide the public with the unique perspectives and ways of experience the world" from the client's point of view. The combined 18,000-square foot parcels would enable the organization to "expand its range of services". FCSN held its grand opening ceremony and art exhibition on its renovated headquarters in August 2024.

In Fall 2021, FCSN partnered with the Sesame Workshop to create the Mandarin Chinese and Cantonese adaptations of the digital storybook "We're Amazing 1, 2, 3" and articles about the "unique challenges Chinese American children with autism face."

In June 2025, FCSN was nominated, by California State Senator Aisha Wahab, for California Association of Nonprofits' "Nonprofit of the Year" award.

== Membership and Personnel ==
Prior to 1997, FCSN started with 10 families. By 2002, FCSN served 250 families; most of which were immigrants from Chinese language-speaking nations and territories such as Hong Kong, Taiwan, and China. By the time of FCSN's grand opening in late 2006, the organization had served more than 400 families, had an operating budget of $800,000, and had 15 paid staff members. In 2008, FCSN hosted a two-week camp for individuals with developmental disabilities ages 9-18. By 2008, the organization had served at least 600 families (20% of them were of non-East Asian descent), 50 paid staff members, and had 200 volunteers. By 2011, FCSN served at least 800 families and offered up to 35 programs around the San Francisco Bay Area. By 2024, FCSN served at least 1,200 families.

Year	Families Served
1997	10
2002	250
2006	400
2008	600
2011	800
2014	800
2019	1,000
2023	1,500
2024	1,200
