= Latvian Association for Support of Disabled People =

Organization based in Riga, Latvia

Latvian Association for Support of Disabled People (LASDP)
- Founded: 2010
- Founder: Elvis Volberg(UK), Vitaly Tihonenko
- Type: Registered charity, NGO
- Purpose: Support the rights and interests of all people with disabilities
- Location: Riga
- Region served: Latvia
- Members: 154 (2013)
- Employees: 30
- Volunteers: 210
- Website: asociacija.org

The Latvian Association for Support of Disabled People (LASDP) is a non-profit organization founded in 2010 and based in Riga, Latvia. The association supports the rights and interests of Latvian people with disabilities, provides transportation and other services, including education and employment consulting. Since 2011, LASDP has participated in international projects and activities in collaboration with other Latvian non-profit organizations and the Ministry of Welfare of the Republic of Latvia.

== Regional branches ==
- Riga and Jūrmala (Central office)
- Liepāja (Western Division)
- Rēzekne (Eastern Division)
- Jelgava Planned in 2014

== Projects and Activities ==
- Promotion of economic and social integration of disabled people
- Accessibility Research projects
- Educational services for disabled people
- Transportation services
