= Foundation for Active Rehabilitation =

Disability organization in Poland

Foundation for Active Rahabilitation (FAR; Polish: Fundacja Aktywnej Rehabilitacji) is a non-profit Polish organization of social and professional rehabilitation of disabled people after spinal cord injuries.

In existence since 1988, the Foundation organizes the biggest Polish sporting event for disabled athletes, called Active Rehabilitation Games. The event is fashioned after similar games in Great Britain called Stocke Mandeville Word Wheelchair Games. The first event was held a decade ago in 1998 and was attended by 300 athletes from Poland, Lithuania, Belarus, Ukraine and Sweden. The Games were held for the eight times in 2008.

Active rehabilitation program offered by the Foundation is a Swedish concept from the late 1970s. It was introduced in Poland by Polish-Swedish diaspora with the help from Swedish instructors who attended the first rehabilitation camp in Poland. The unique aspect of the program is that both, the sporting coaches and the caretakers are also disabled.
