= Full-Option Science System =

The Full-Option Science System (FOSS) is a research-based science curriculum for grades K–8 developed at the Lawrence Hall of Science, University of California, Berkeley. FOSS is also an ongoing research project dedicated to improving the learning and teaching of science.

== History ==
The FOSS K–8 program was developed at the Lawrence Hall of Science, University of California at Berkeley, under three separate National Science Foundation grants (1988 1991, 1996). The program was originally developed and trial tested in urban and suburban San Francisco Bay Area school districts and field-tested and implemented nationally in ten sites. Twenty-six modules were developed for K–6, and nine courses for middle school. The FOSS K–6 program went through a major revision in 2000 and was then adopted in Texas. The program went through a minor revision in 2005. A new, California specific, edition was developed for the California science adoption (K–5) in 2007. FOSS is currently published by Delta Education, a division of School Specialty Inc.

== Pedagogy ==
The FOSS program uses several instructional pedagogies: inquiry-based learning (each investigation is guided by questions), hands-on learning and active investigation (students work with materials and conduct investigations to attempt to answer questions), student-to-student interaction, writing (students keep careful notes in science notebooks), and research/reading (readings are included to enhance or underscore active investigation—students work with materials prior to doing any reading).

== Components ==
Each K–6 module consists of a kit of student materials, a teacher guide, and a student reading book. Each middle school course includes a kit of student materials, a teacher guide, a Science Resources book, a lab notebook, and a course-specific multimedia component. The FOSS website, FOSSweb, contains additional online activities for students and resources for parents and teachers. FOSSweb has two sister sites, FOSSweb CA, for the California 2007 edition, and FOSSweb NYC, for New York City teachers using FOSS.

== Program use and adoption ==
FOSS is in use in every state in the country with over 100,000 teachers and 2 million students and is in approximately 16% of the nation's school districts. FOSS was the first non-textbook curriculum to make the California adoption list (1992) and was adopted in California for the 2007 science adoption (FOSS California K–5). The program is on many state adoption lists and is used in 50 of the 100 largest U.S. school districts. FOSS is cited as an exemplary program in publications by nationally recognized organizations in the science reform movement, including National Science Resources Center, and the National Science Teachers Association.

FOSS has been approved as a recommended science program in each of the adoption states in which it has been submitted.

== References and further reading ==
Scruggs, T., & Mastropieri, M. (1994). The construction of scientific knowledge by students with mild disabilities. The Journal of Special Education, 28, 307-321.
