= Indigenous Disability Canada / British Columbia Aboriginal Network on Disability Society =

Indigenous charity in Canada

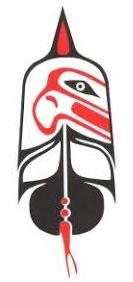
- BCANDS Logo
- Abbreviation: IDC/BCANDS
- Formation: 1991
- Type: Canadian National Indigenous Disability Organization
- Legal status: Active
- Purpose: Disability Services, Support and Advocacy
- Headquarters: Victoria, British Columbia, Canada
- Location: 1610 Island Highway - Victoria - British Columbia / 130 Albert Street - Suite 1103 Ottawa - Ontario
- Region served: British Columbia and Canada
- Website: www.bcands.bc.ca

Indigenous Disability Canada / British Columbia Aboriginal Network on Disability Society (IDC/BCANDS) is a national Indigenous disability organization, with offices based in Victoria, British Columbia, Canada, and Ottawa, Ontario. IDC/BCANDS provides cross disability-related support and services to Indigenous (First Nation, Métis, Inuit) peoples in Canada with disabilities, and advocates for the full inclusion of all Indigenous peoples with disabilities, both socially and economically.

IDC/BCANDS was established in 1991 to address the needs of Indigenous peoples with disabilities and works to remove the barriers they face. BCANDS holds Special Consultative Status with the United Nations Economic and Social Council (ECOSOC) and Approved Observer status with the European Association of Service Providers for Persons with Disabilities (EASPD).

The IDC/BCANDS head office is located in Victoria, British Columbia, on the traditional territories of the Lekwungen People.

== Areas of work / initiatives ==
Indigenous Disability Canada / British Columbia Aboriginal Network on Disability Society provides one-to-one disability related services, as well as awareness and outreach activities aimed at individuals and families, federal, provincial and territorial governments, Indigenous leadership and the public, both within Canada and at the international level.

== Programs/services ==
- Indigenous Disability Case Management / Navigation
- Indigenous Registered Disability Savings Plan (RDSP) Navigation
- First Nation Persons with Disabilities / Monthly Nutritional Supplement Adjudication Program
- Jordan's Principle
- National Indigenous Benefit Navigation (NINS) Program
- Voices of Inclusion: Oral Histories of Indigenous Disability
- Government Liaison / Disability Advocacy
- Convention on the Rights of Persons with Disabilities (CRPD)

== Awareness ==
Indigenous Disability Awareness Month (IDAM)

In 2015, the organization established Indigenous Disability Awareness Month (IDAM) to raise awareness of the contributions that Indigenous peoples living with disabilities bring to Canadian communities, and holds annual events during the month. In 2017, the United Nations International Committee on the Rights of Persons Living with Disabilities, in its Concluding Observations Report, recommended that Canada officially recognize and proclaim the month. IDAM is observed annually by various provinces in Canada, in addition to Indigenous and non-Indigenous communities and organizations.

RDSP Awareness Month

Each year during October, the organization promotes the Registered Disability Saving Plan through virtual awareness activities, community events, and the distribution of materials.

National Indigenous AccessAbility Week

Each year during National AccessAbility Week in Canada, the organization promotes accessibility from an Indigenous disability lens, through the hosting of awareness events and distribution of materials.

Indigenous Partnership Award

In 2015, the organization established the BCANDS Indigenous Partnership Award to recognize individuals or organizations that have made significant contributions to advancing Indigenous disability issues in Canada. Notable recipients include federal politician and Paralympian Carla Qualtrough, former Assistant Deputy Minister Molly Harrington, and renowned disability advocate and lawyer, Kerri Joffe. Recipients of the award are determined by the organization's leadership and are typically presented during Indigenous Disability Awareness Month.

National Indigenous Disability and Wellness Gathering

The organization periodically hosts a national gathering with Indigenous and non-Indigenous leadership. communities, persons with disabilities, government, and stakeholders to raise awareness of Indigenous disability in Canada. The next Gathering is scheduled for November 2026, during the 12th anniversary of Indigenous Disability Awareness Month in Canada.

== Awards ==
Family Support Institute of BC - Provincial Award - 2021

Finalist - Premier's Innovation & Excellence Awards - 2020

Finalist - Premier's Innovation & Excellence Awards - 2019

Essl Foundation - Zero Project International Award - 2019

Finalist - Premier's Innovation & Excellence Awards - 2018

Doctors of BC - Excellence in Health Promotion Award - 2018

Canadian Alliance on Mental Illness and Mental Health - Champion of Mental Health Award - 2018

Canadian Medical Association - Excellence in Health Promotion - 2016

March of Dimes Canada - Judge George Ferguson Award - 2015

Social Planning and Research Council of BC (SPARC BC) - Deryck Thompson Award - 2014

BC Medical Association - Excellence in Health Promotion - 2013

Canadian Mental Health Association - BC Region - Dr. Nancy Hall Public Policy Leadership Award - 2013

== Notable persons ==
- Ian Hinksman - Disability Advocate - co-founder of BCANDS
- Stephen Lytton - Disability Advocate - Board Member
- Richard Peter - Former Board Member - Paralympian
- Rick Hansen - Honorary Patron
- Diana Fowler LeBlanc - Honorary Patron
