= Action Deaf Youth =

Charity in Northern Ireland

- Abbreviation: ADY
- Formation: 1988
- Type: Registered charity
- Purpose: Deaf youth support
- Headquarters: Belfast, Northern Ireland
- Chairperson: Rosie McGee
- Organiser: Richard Dougherty
- Senior Manager: Caroline Doherty
- Website: actiondeafyouth.org
- Formerly called: Northern Ireland Deaf Youth Association (NIDYA)

Action Deaf Youth is the largest deaf youth organisation in Northern Ireland, headquartered in Belfast. Founded in 1988 as the Northern Ireland Deaf Youth Association, it is a registered charity offering mentoring, training and volunteer services to deaf children and young people up to the age of 30. Services provided include play therapy sessions and sign camps, and youth clubs and events enabling deaf teens to participate in their communities and meet and build relationships with their peers across Northern Ireland.

== Background ==
The Northern Ireland Deaf Youth Association (NIDYA) was set up in 1988 by a group of 12 young people, including individuals from different regions of Northern Ireland, who identified a shared feeling of isolation and need for support. For many years, it was based out of Wilton House in Belfast. Through the 1990s, the association was led by co-founder Malachy McBurney, and received help in fundraising from Tom Ferguson, an avid supporter of the Deaf community in Northern Ireland.

In 2001, the NIDYA co-authored a landmark report with the University of Ulster titled, "Big 'D' wee 'd': The lives of young deaf people in Northern Ireland". The study was the first of its kind to be conducted in Northern Ireland, and found that young deaf people faced "discrimination, cultural isolation and segregation in schools and the workplace". Based on the report's findings, University of Ulster and NIDYA called on the Department of Education to review the standard of education provision for deaf children, questioning why 40% of deaf children in Northern Ireland were forced to leave their families at a young age to attend specialist schools in Dublin and England.

== Services ==
The organisation provides an early childhood service called "Let's Play and Grow" for deaf children from infants to eight years of age and their families. Group play sessions led by a team of specialists help deaf children with language acquisition, communication, peer interaction, and literacy. They can also help parents learn sign language, so they can communicate more effectively with their children at home. During school holidays, Action Deaf Youth offers outdoor play camps for deaf children aged four to eight, along with their siblings.

It also provides Play and Creative Arts Therapy sessions for children between the ages of 3 and 12+ experiencing emotional and psychological challenges or issues with behaviour, which are available by referral only.

For youths ages 11 through 25, Action Deaf Youth offers youth support throughout Northern Ireland, through youth clubs that develop skills, self-confidence, and friendships, and encourage young people to explore ways to manage their deafness. In addition, the charity has worked with mainstream youth clubs to raise awareness about deafness.

== Events and programmes ==
Action Deaf Youth organises numerous events and programmes for deaf children and young people. It has hosted free employment and training support days for school leavers, with participation from organisations such as the British Deaf Association and D'Sign Arts NI.

The organisation also encourages members to lobby politicians on issues affecting deaf youth. In 2015, Action Deaf Youth organised a bilateral exchange with the Hungarian Association of the Deaf and Hard of Hearing (SINOSZ). As part of the exchange, 18 delegates from Northern Ireland, aged 16 to 25, visited Hungary and learned about how legislation in that country has improved the rights and quality of life of deaf people. Following the visit, they headed to Stormont to meet with members of the Legislative Assembly (MLAs) to demand better support for sign language and improved access to services.

== Funding ==
In 2002, the Northern Ireland Youth Deaf Association was one of 62 projects in Northern Ireland to receive funding from the EU Programme for Peace and Reconciliation.

In 2015, NIDYA received a grant of €25,000 from Erasmus+, the EU programme for education, training, youth and sport. The grant was for its project with SINOSZ, the youth group in Hungary.

In 2016, Action Deaf Youth received a grant of £675,304 from the Big Lottery Fund's Supporting Families programme, for its five-year project, "Supporting Families of Deaf Children through Active Play".

Prior to Brexit, Action Deaf Youth was a recipient of a grant from the European Social Fund (ESF) for its employability programme, "Supporting Deaf Young People Into Employment".

In 2022, 55 barristers from the Bar Library of Northern Ireland raised £16,000 for Action Deaf Youth, through their participation in 11 relay teams during the Belfast City Marathon.
