= Lawrence Hall of Science =

Public science center in Berkeley, California

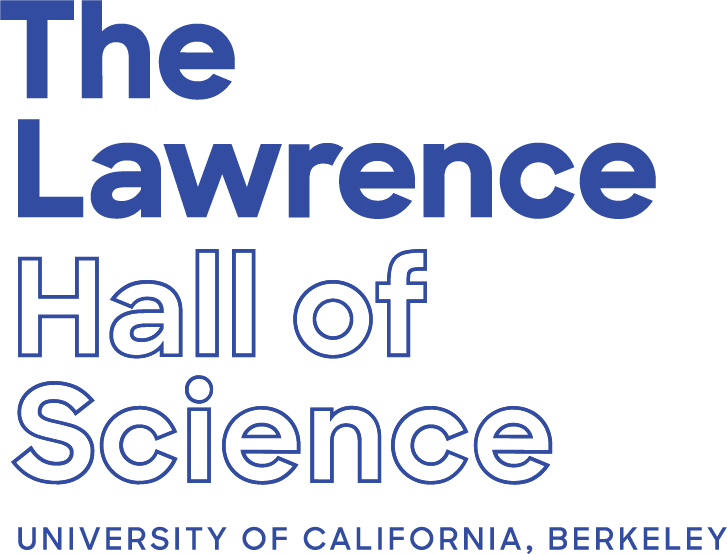

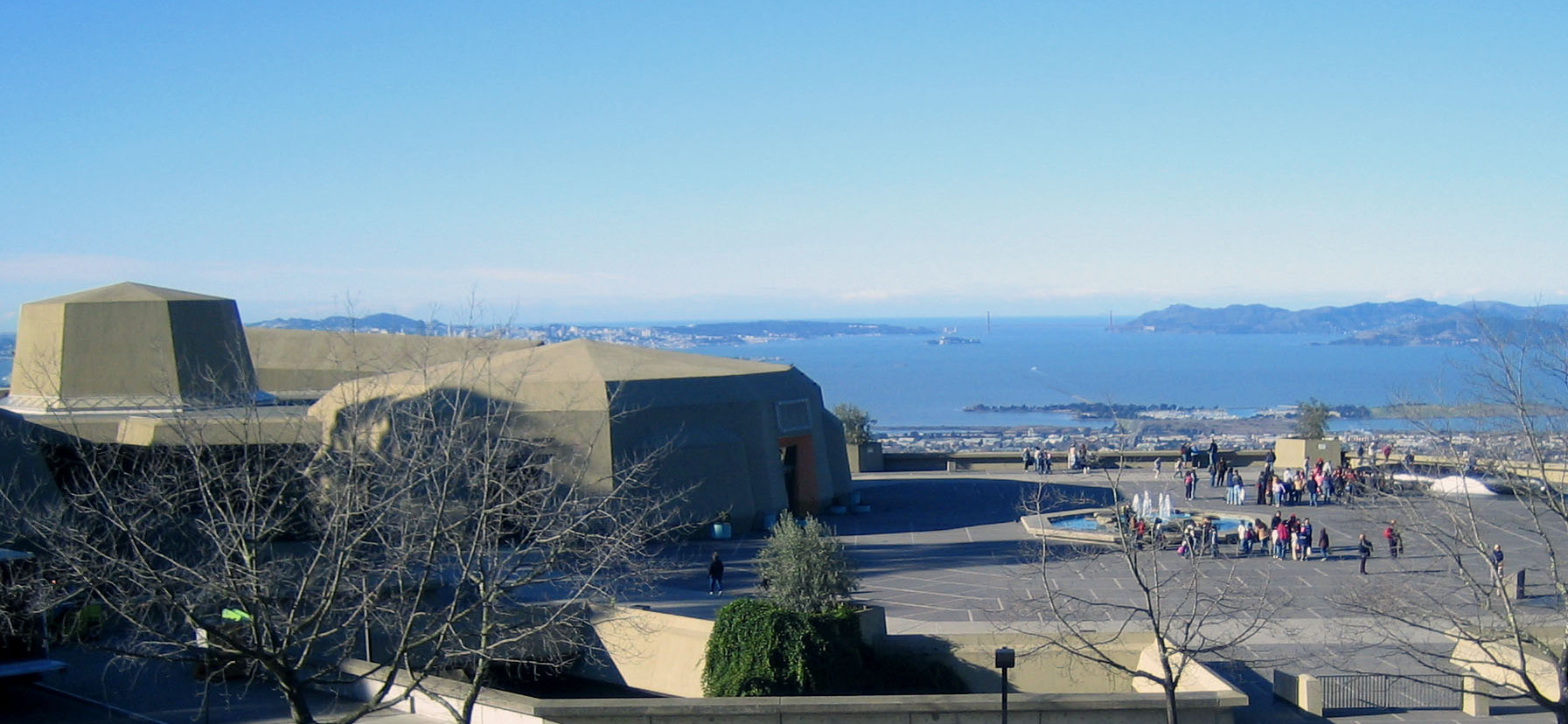
- Established: 1968
- Location: Berkeley, California, United States
- Coordinates: 37°52′46″N 122°14′48″W
- Type: Science
- Director: Rena Dorph
- Public transit access: AC Transit #65 or UC Berkeley Shuttle
- Website: lawrencehallofscience.org

The Lawrence Hall of Science is a public science center in Berkeley, California that offers hands-on science exhibits, designs curriculum, aids professional development, and offers after school science resources to students of all ages. The Lawrence was established in 1968 in honor of physicist Ernest Orlando Lawrence (1901–1958), the University of California's first Nobel laureate. The center is located in the hills above the University of California, Berkeley campus, less than a mile uphill from the University's Botanical Garden.

== Permanent exhibits ==
Selected locations in and near Tilden Regional Park
- Points of interest
- Nearby parks and museums
1 Tilden Little Farm
2 Tilden Park Merry-Go-Round
3 Inspiration Point
4 Lake Anza
5 Brazilian Room
6 Regional Parks Botanic Garden
7 Tilden Park Golf Course
8 Redwood Valley Railway
9 Blake Garden
10 Indian Rock Park
11 Berkeley Rose Garden
12 Lawrence Hall of Science
13 San Pablo Reservoir
- Science on a Sphere – interactive globe displaying real scientific data from Earth. Scientific data displayed on the globe includes Earth's weather patterns, ocean temperatures and currents, climate change, day and night views of the Earth, and tsunami and hurricane patterns. Science on a Sphere was developed by researchers at the National Oceanic and Atmospheric Administration (NOAA).
- Forces That Shape the Bay – outdoor science park, which explores the seismological forces that created and still affect the entire San Francisco Bay area.
- Sunstones – an 18-foot granite astronomical sculpture, created by David Cudaback and Richard O'Hanlon and installed outside the Hall in 1979. Sight lines in the piece allow visitors to view northern- and southernmost setting of the sun at the solstices and many other important astronomical events.
- Young Explorers Area– a multi-sensory play area for children in kindergarten and younger.
- Ernest O. Lawrence Memorial – devoted to the life and research of Ernest O. Lawrence. This exhibit features a biographical film on Lawrence's life and a pair of "Dee" electrodes from one of the first cyclotrons.
- Insect Zoo – See hermit crabs, Indian walking sticks, a tarantula, and hissing cockroaches.
- The Animal Discovery Zone – where children learn about animals. Many homeschool and other classes are held in the Animal Discovery Zone and provide the opportunity for children to observe and interact with animals.
- Ingenuity Challenges – A different design challenge each month allows kids to think critically and explore real world engineering problems.
- Pheena the Fin Whale – a life sized model of a juvenile fin whale residing on the plaza.
- An eight hundred million-to-one scale model of a DNA (deoxyribonucleic acid) molecule on the plaza is another favorite place for young visitors to play. This sculpture was designed by Michael Jantzen of Valencia, California. It was put in place in the spring of 1992.

== Traveling exhibits ==
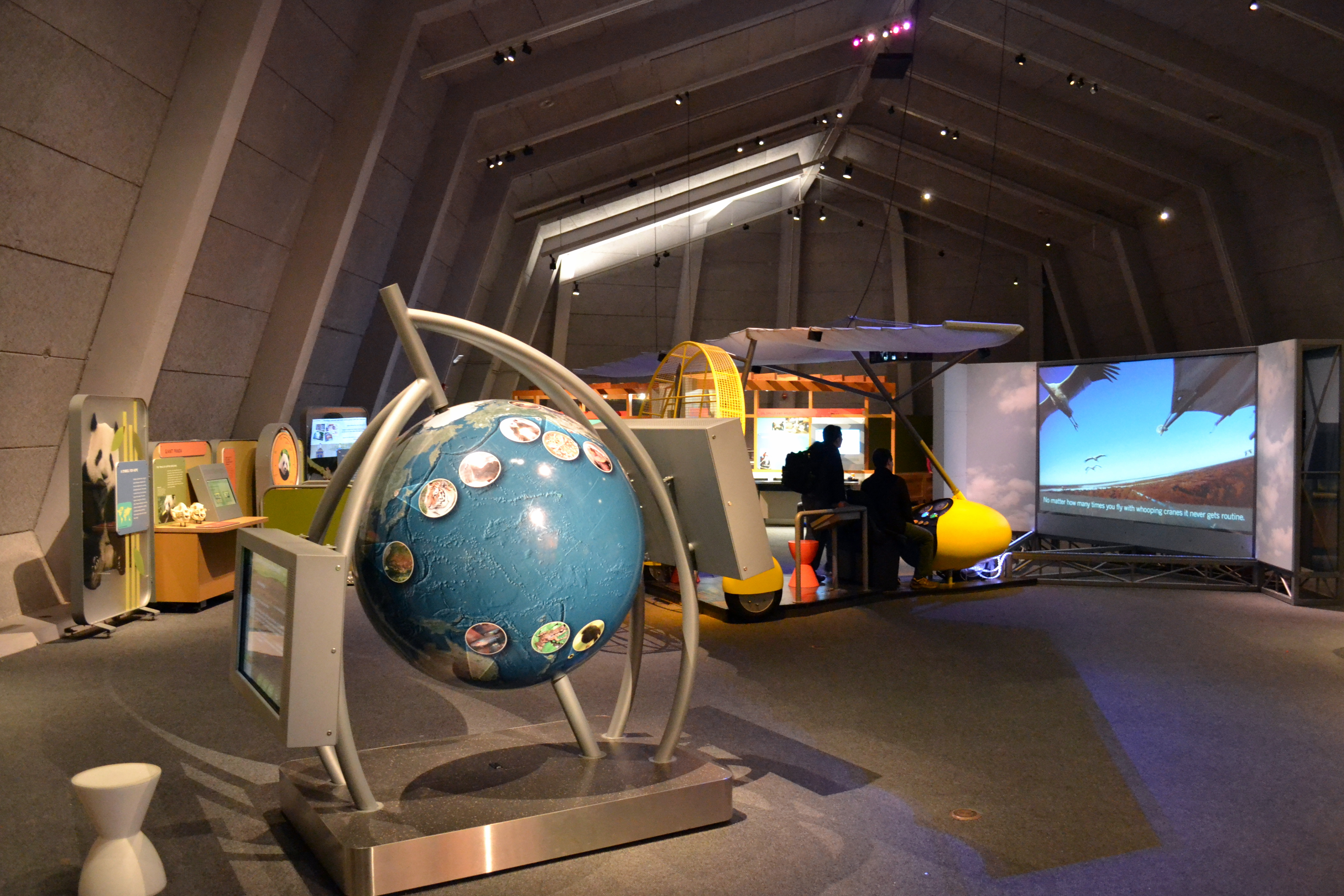
An exhibit hall

In addition to its permanent exhibits, the Lawrence Hall of Science has featured a rotation of traveling exhibits. Past traveling exhibits include: Tony Hawk Rad Science, Dinosaurs Unearthed, Scream Machines: The Science of Roller Coasters, RACE: Are We So Different?, Facing Mars, Animal Grossology, Waterworks, Engineer It, Speed, Wild Music: Songs and Sounds of Life, Circus! Science at the Big Top, Grossology, My Home, Planet Earth, Big Dinos Return, Candy Unwrapped, and Math Midway.

== Nobel Prize display ==
In 2003, following the death of Lawrence's widow, Molly Lawrence, the Lawrence family chose the Lawrence Hall of Science to house his 1939 Nobel Prize in Physics. The Nobel Prize medal was placed in a display case in the E.O. Lawrence Memorial room, a permanent exhibit which displays artifacts of his life and work of nearly forty years.

On March 1, 2007 a member of the Lawrence Hall of Science Exhibits staff reported that the Nobel Prize medal was missing from its locked display case. The UC Police Department was notified immediately and began an investigation into the medal's theft. A $2,500 award was offered in exchange for the medal's recovery and information leading to the arrest and conviction of the suspect. The medal is made from 23 karat gold and worth approximately $4,000. Lawrence's medal was the first Nobel Prize awarded to the University of California and the first Nobel Prize won by an American public university. The prize was recovered and a student was arrested on suspicion of grand theft. A replica of the Ernest Lawrence Nobel Prize now resides in the museum display case.

== Planetarium ==
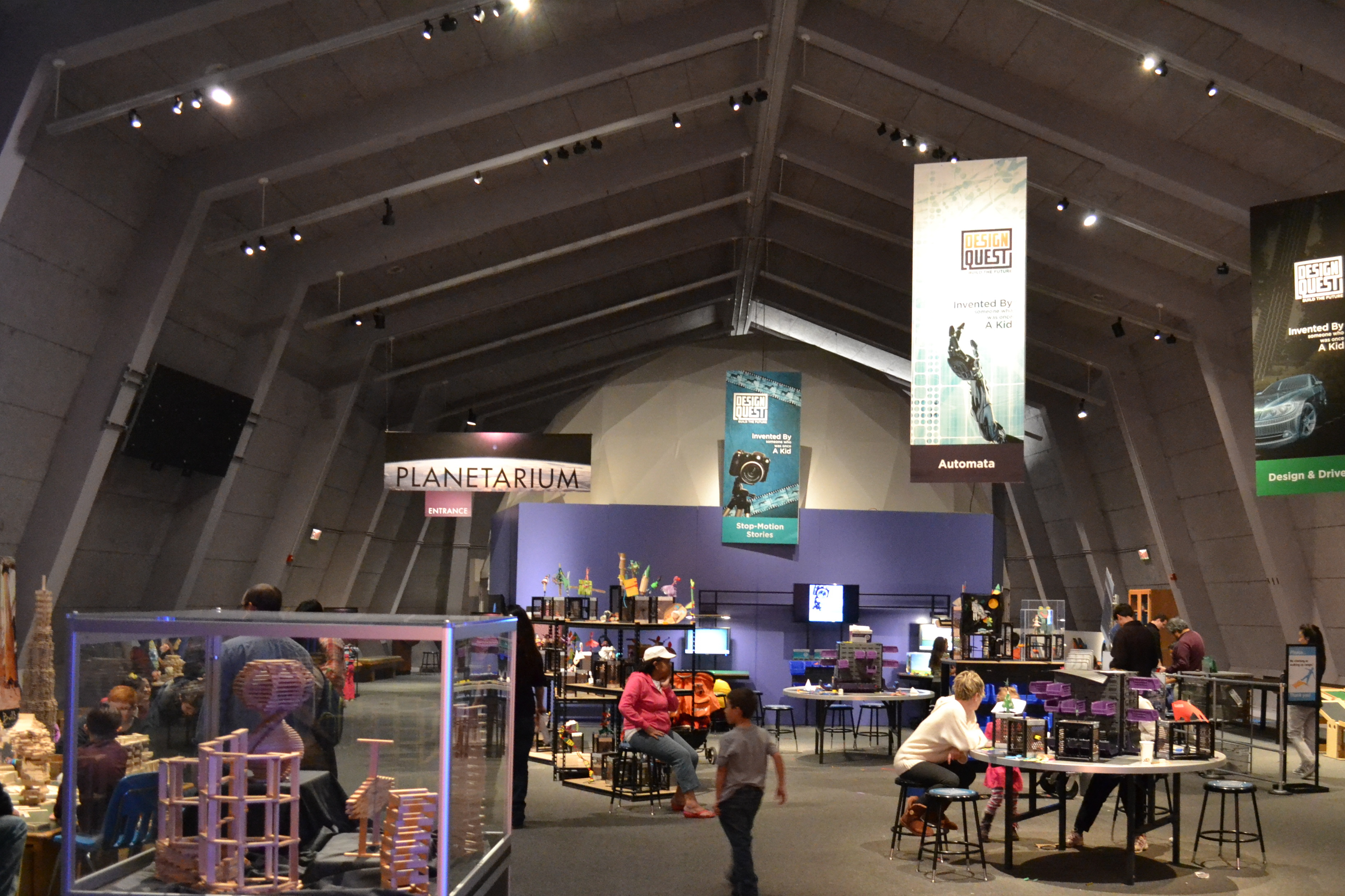
An exhibit hall and the planetarium

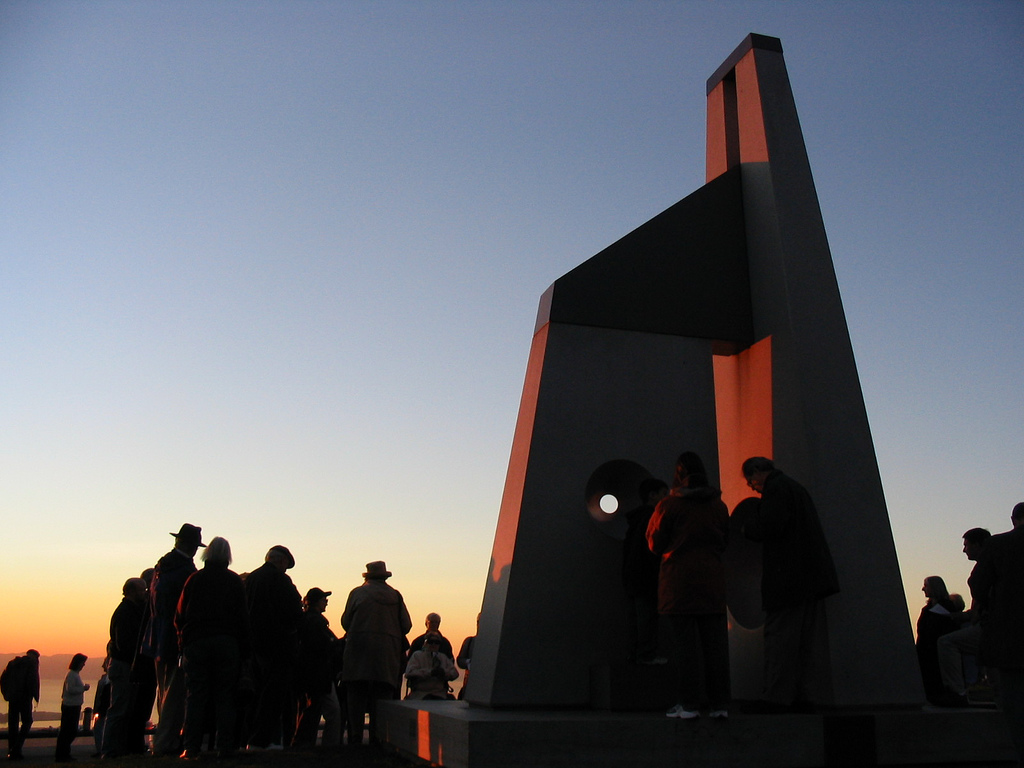
Hall visitors observe the winter solstice using the Sunstones II

The Lawrence Hall of Science develops interactive planetarium shows for its own planetarium and other small planetariums. The planetarium was built in 1973 and directed by Alan Friedman. The Holt Planetarium's programs have focused on audience participation, an innovation that has changed the way small planetariums around the world present astronomy to the public. In 2000 the Holt Planetarium was deemed "The Best Planetarium in the Whole World" by The Planetarian, Journal of the International Planetarium Society.

The planetarium presents live, interactive shows (approximately 25 minutes long), following the hands-on philosophy of science education.

The Holt Planetarium has an interactive approach to astronomy education. Their programs actively engage audience members in activities such as finding constellations, searching for exoplanets, and so forth. The planetarium at Pacific Science Center in Seattle (originally called Star Lab, now called the Willard Smith Planetarium) was directly modeled on the Holt. Dennis Schatz was hired in 1977 from Lawrence Hall of Science as the opening director of the Pacific Science Center planetarium.

== Publications and curriculum ==
Views from Lawrence Hall of Science

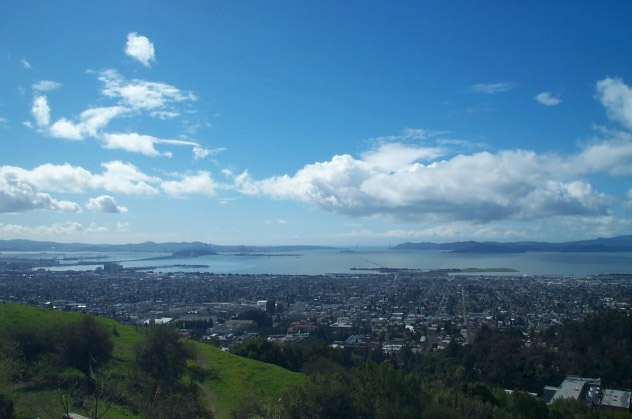
The view of the San Francisco Bay as seen from the Lawrence Hall of Science in Berkeley, California

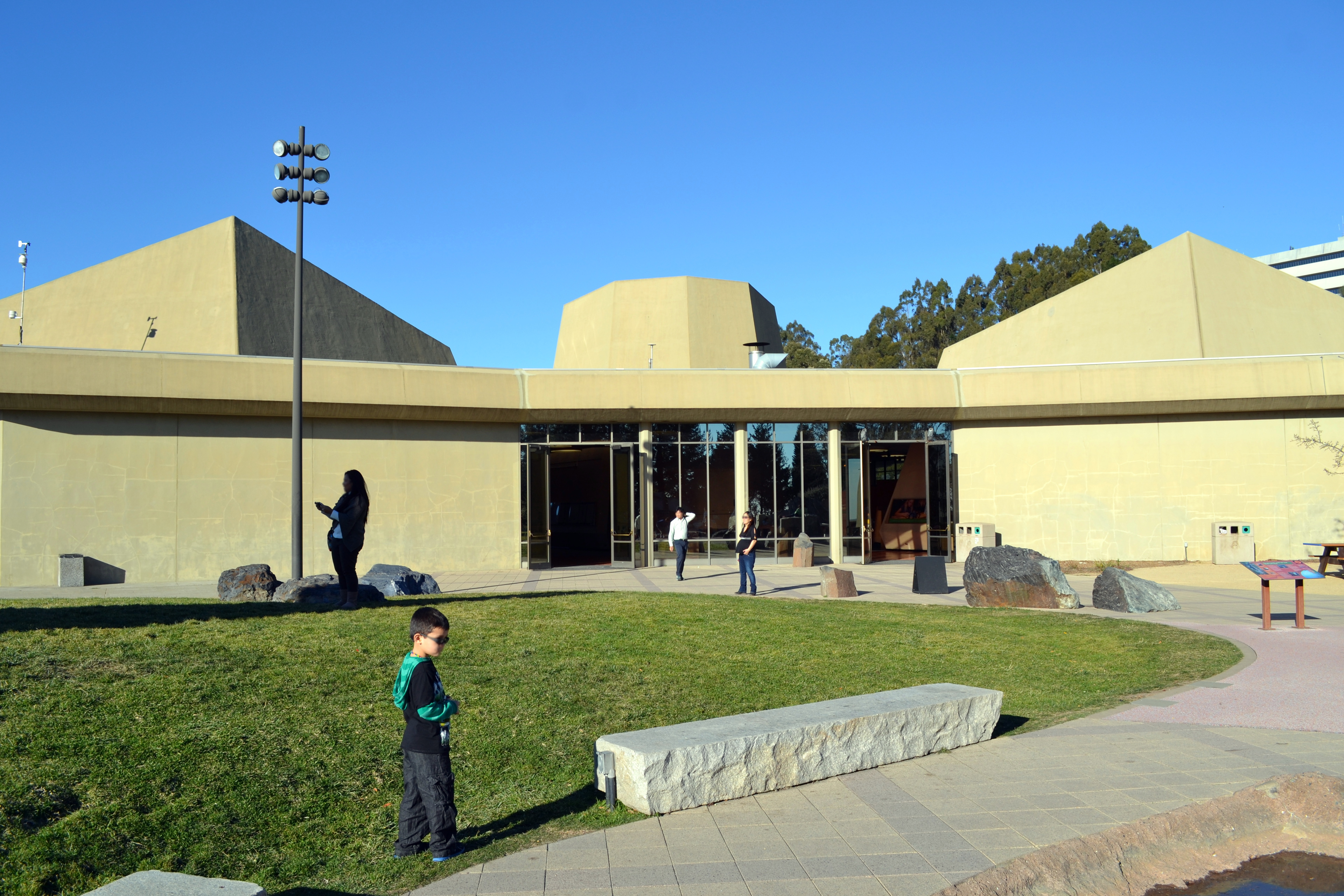
View from terrace

Curriculum and publications developed by the Lawrence Hall of Science programs such as EQUALS/FAMILY MATH, Full Option Science System (FOSS), Great Explorations in Math and Science (GEMS), Marine Activities and Resources in Education (MARE), PEACHES—a program for early childhood educators, and Science Education for Public Understanding Program (SEPUP) reach many students nationwide and around the world. New programs are frequently developed and expanded at the Hall, such as Global Systems Science (GSS), Hands-On Universe (HOU), and Seeds of Science – Roots of Reading.

== Education ==
The Lawrence has an extensive education division, offering year-round youth and family classes and day camps on-site. Classes focus on a wide range of subjects, including biology, chemistry, astronomy, mathematics, robotics and art. In addition to on-site classes, residential summer camps are held in various locations in California.

In the 1970s and 1980s, the Lawrence offered gifted teenagers free computer systems access through a program called The Friday Project, or FRID. This was important at the time because computers weren't readily available in homes so that access to computers was otherwise only at school. To become a "FRID kid", one had to submit a project proposal and be accepted by its leaders. Computer systems available included Hewlett-Packard's 2000B, Data General's Nova and Eclipse, and Control Data Corporation's PLATO internet-like system that pioneered key on-line concepts such as forums, message boards, online testing, e-mail, chat rooms, picture languages, instant messaging, remote screen sharing, and multi-player games.

== In film ==
In the 1970s, several science fiction films utilized the Lawrence Hall of Science:

- The 1970 film Colossus: The Forbin Project used this location as the fictional Colossus command center. Actually filmed in 1969.
- Scenes from the 1971 movie THX 1138 were filmed at the Lawrence Hall of Science.
- A flyover shot of the Lawrence Hall of Science is briefly featured as a location shot in the opening of the pilot episode of The Bionic Woman (1976).
