= Catalan Association for the Blind and Visually Impaired =

Blindness organization in Spain

The Catalan Association for the Blind and Visually Impaired (Associació Catalana de Cecs i Disminuïts Visuals – ACCDV), with headquarters in Barcelona (Catalonia, Spain), is a non-profit organization, registered in the Registre d'Associacions de la Conselleria de Justícia de la Generalitat de Catalunya with the number 14,965 and declared of Public Utility by the Ministerio del Interior on December 29, 1997.

== History ==
In 1993, the Catalan Association for the Blind and Visually Impaired (ACCDV) was formed by a group of people who provided initial support and funding. The reason behind this formation was due to the lack of social integration and basic services for local visually impaired people. The intention of the ACCDV was to offer services, provide a voice about local issues, improve social integration and improve the quality of life for visually impaired people.

On February 17, 1994, the ACCDV was recorded in the Direcció General de Dret i d'Entitats Jurídiques del Departament de Justícia de la Generalitat de Catalunya Register with the number 14,965.

The ACCDV initially began by mainly offering socio-cultural animation activities with the support of a few volunteers in a private apartment. Due to volunteer participation, the ACCDV was able to extend its areas of work to Personal Services, Cultural Services and Social Services.

In 1996, the ACCDV moved to a small office and signed an agreement with the Dirección General de Objeción de Conciencia del Ministerio de Justicia to include conscientious objectors in its activities. The high number of volunteers and objectors involved made it necessary to create specific courses to formalize the training they received.

The following year, the Ministeri de l'Interior recognized the ACCDV's task and declared it of Public Utility on December 29.

The year after, the Institut Català del Voluntariat of the Generalitat de Catalunya received competency over conscientious objection and reaffirmed its collaboration with the ACCDV, assigning a substantial number of objectors to its activities, with the parallel increase in services offered by the Association. That same year, the ACCDV started to promote scientific research oriented to the solution of visual problems. It also began to raise awareness with the local population in general on the necessity of this research.

In 1999, the Social Studies Classroom (Aula d'Estudis Socials – AES) was created with the aim of designing, creating and teaching training courses to volunteers working for the ACCDV and the general public.

In 2006, the ACCDV received a significant financial donation from La Caixa and the Pfizer Foundation which enabled it to become a mid-sized organization. It was able to offer more improved services with the incorporation of many professionals, offering more adapted computer classes, a new psychological area, new courses and workshops on braille and new technologies, raising awareness in children, introduction to disabilities, barriers and guide dogs.

== Mission ==
There are currently in Catalonia 10,000 blind people and 200,000 with low vision. These people have numerous problems due to their disability which vary according to the moment they were affected. It is not the same someone who is born blind, someone who becomes blind in adulthood or someone with low vision.

The ACCDV's goal is to offer services to blind and visually impaired people in order to improve their quality of life and accomplish a better integration of the collective.

Personal Services

These are the most important and closest to the person, who is treated on an individual basis, according to his or her particular needs. They cover four concrete areas:

- Basic rehabilitation
- Accompaniment and help to blind and visually impaired people
- Psychological help
- Education

Cultural Services

With these services, the ACCDV tries to bring culture closer to visually impaired people. They cover four areas:

- Socio-cultural animation
- Adaptation of cultural material
- Adaptation of live cultural events
- Adaptation of museums and monuments

Social Services

These are the most general and are aimed to society in its totality. They cover five areas:

- Social integration
- Work integration
- Vindicating our rights
- Resolution of bureaucratic problems
- Promoting research

== Publications ==
An increasing awareness of the physical and social barriers a severely visually impaired person must overcome, their personal experience, new scientific and therapeutic discoveries about vision, and the technological improvements that make communication between the visually impaired person and society possible can all be the basis for a better world.

The Catalan Association for the Blind and the Visually Handicapped (ACCDV) understands it must propagate its objectives by creating its own means of communication where plurality of thought and the characteristics of our collective can have a platform of expression.

Trimestral Bulletin: With this publication, the Association's members are informed about all the activities the ACCDV offers. Socio-cultural animation activities occupy an important space. The Bulletin also informs about: audiobook and sono-cinema projects, meetings between ACCDV and Catalan institutions which work for the welfare of visually impaired people; actions developed to promote the rights of our collective; and activities developed by the commissions and the dates of their work meetings.

The Eye Magazine: This is ACCDV's most ambitious communication project, by means of which, it creates awareness of the problems a society based on 'normality' presents to visually disabled people and propagate their ideas and opinions. The Eye Magazine is intended for the Association's members, visually impaired people, professionals and the public in general.

Audio books: Reading Braille can be difficult for many people who have partially or totally lost their sight. The most convenient system in these cases is the Audio book, which is the recording of a literary work on a four track tape, a Daisy format CD or an Mp3 file.

Annual report of the situation of visually impaired people in Catalonia: This ACCDV report is intended to inform the general public about the current situation in terms of access of visually disabled people to culture, work, new technologies, attention, etc.

Annual Memory: The edition of the Annual Memory gives account of all the activities promoted and developed by the Association in society in general, towards which it directs its services and from which it receives the necessary help to develop its assumed task. In every area, the Association's achievements and future expectations of the services offered are stated.
