= Adult daycare center =

Non-residential facility

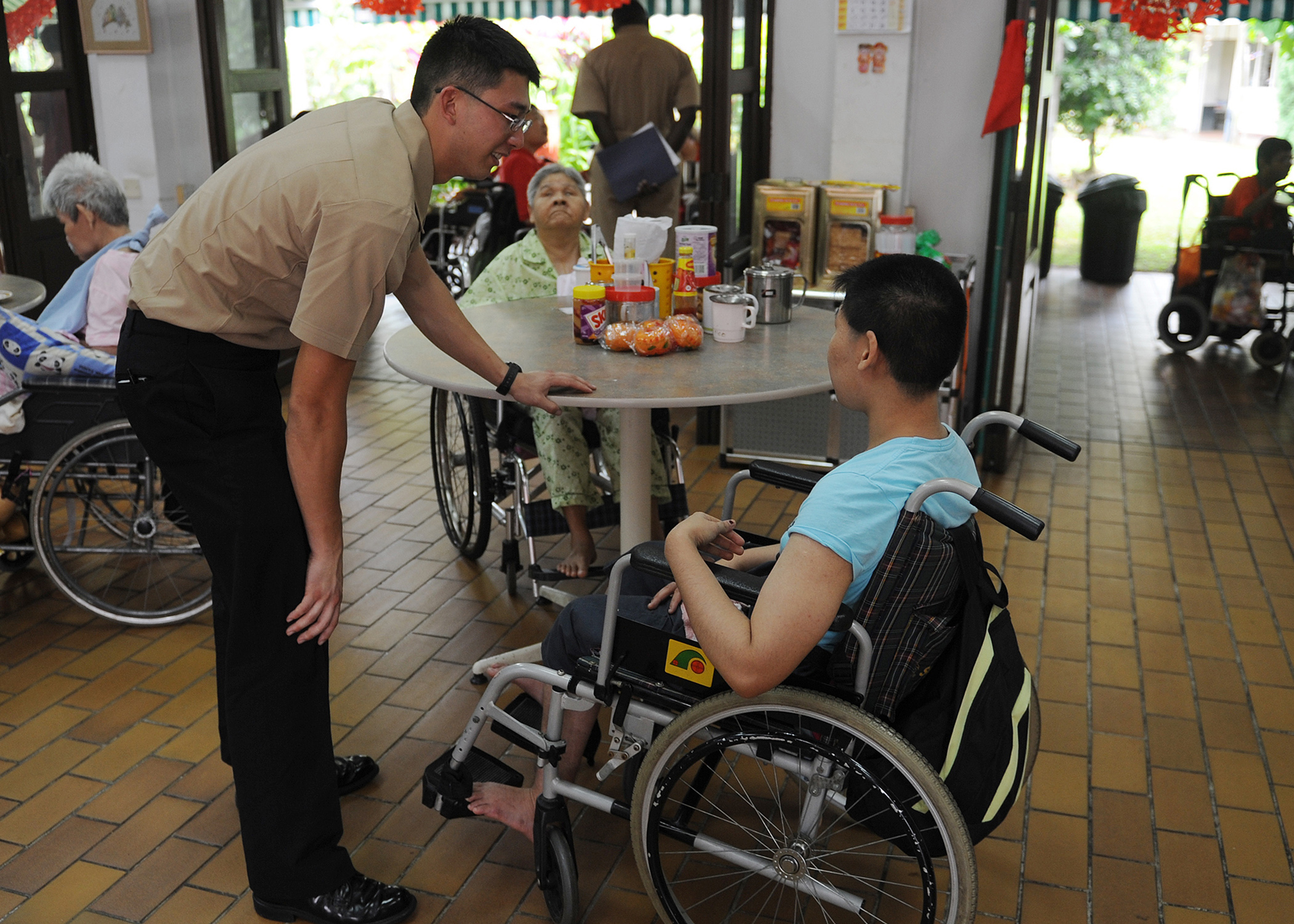
Seaman Recruit Michael Schultz interacts with a resident at the Singapore Cheshire Home Day Care Centre as part of a community service project in Singapore.

An adult daycare centre is typically a non-residential facility that supports the health, nutritional, social, and daily living needs of adults with disabilities including dementia, in a professionally staffed, group setting. These facilities can also provide adults with transitional care and short-term rehabilitation following hospital discharge. The majority of day centres provide meals, meaningful activities, and general supervision. The care provided is often a social model (focusing on socialisation and prevention services) or a medical model (including skilled assessment, treatment and rehabilitation goals) provided in order to improve participants health and guide their progress in the right direction. Demand for adult daycare centres is increasing with the need for assistance in old age or guidance to reintegrate into society after injury, illness or addiction, and accommodation to return to their former lives or improve upon their quality of life.

== Purpose and overview ==
Adult daycare centres primarily focus on providing care for people with a specific chronic condition, including: Alzheimer's disease and other types of dementia; additionally, these services may be available for any adult with disabilities and also the elderly population. Numerous centres maintain a nurse on-site and devote a room for participants who require their vital signs to be checked and evaluated regularly; or needs other health services during their visit. Facilities may also provide transportation and personal care including support groups for caregivers.

Attending an adult daycare centre can prevent people from needing to be re-hospitalised and may delay their admission to residential long-term care. For participants, who would otherwise stay at home alone, social stimulation and recreational activities have been known to improve or maintain physical fitness and cognitive function. The more severe the disease is, the greater the burden will be on the caregiver. Therefore, 19.1% of caregivers with clients made use of these services. Adult daycare centres may be able to provide respite care, enabling caregivers to work or have a break from their caregiving responsibilities.

These facilities are beneficial to many as the activities accommodate stimulating interaction with other people, which has been known to improve the participant's health and emotional well-being. All certified adult daycare centres are monitored and staffed for the protection of participants as well as being a helping hand for new people having trouble connecting with others or do not feel comfortable in certain environments. This program aims to build up confidence and ability to maintain an independent lifestyle along with improving physical and mental health.

Another important aspect of an adult daycare centre is the information about suitable healthy diet plans and exercise regimes. This can benefit health as some people lose the ability to maintain a healthy lifestyle, especially for participants coming from rehabilitation or dementia wards, who may forget what they have or have not done a particular day. This introduces participants to new activities and may spark interest in a hobby that they would like to pursue and learn about.

== Adult daycare centres worldwide ==
Adult daycare centres have grown over the last few decades because the health services available currently surpass those of the past in both service and demand. As demand for adult daycare centres increases, more locations are getting involved, mainly in the US, where all fifty states participate in this program to some degree. This is largely due to the variety of other names for these facilities. Therefore, under the specific name of 'adult daycare', the US holds the majority of research. In Australia and some European countries, the term 'respite' or 'community care' is more common where others may use community outreach, nursing homes or support groups.

The main aim of an adult daycare centre is to provide quality care and enriching interaction with other participants. This will enhance participants' skill and knowledge while engaging them in activities appropriate for their abilities, such as arts and crafts, music, games (bingo, Scrabble), exercise regimes (yoga, pilates), interest discussion (books, films), general socialisation and conversations intended to form friendly relationships.

=== Australia ===
Adult daycare centres in Australia are designed to promote independence and free thinking for people with disabilities, aged adults or people with diverse linguistic backgrounds. The purpose of this is to introduce them back into normal social environments, which are monitored by staff, to enable a new experience for participants by providing a forum to gain new friends and skill sets.

There are many facilities in Australia that provide this program. However, Australia expresses the term 'respite' or 'community care' more commonly. In Western Australia alone, there are 23 facilities branching from Joondalup through to Mandurah, Perth, of these: 13 provide a residence for the elderly people, two focus on people with Huntington's disease and the remaining eight facilities are dedicated to younger people with disabilities and rehabilitation patients. In Australia, the cost of a day at an adult daycare centre currently stands between $25 and $70 (AUS) depending on the patient's needs and requirements. Facilities may charge an hourly rate for non-residential participants who come for the activities or social interaction. These prices generally range from $5 to $15 (AUS).

=== United States ===
In 2014, 4,800 registered adult daycare centres were operating in the United States, providing care for more than 282,000 elderly Americans. 44.2% of centres were operating as for-profit corporations. Daily fees may be less than a home health visit and half the cost of a skilled nursing facility, but vary depending on the services provided. The 2017 average daily cost of adult day services is $70. Funding comes from participant fees, third party insurance, and public and philanthropic sources.

According to the 2010 MetLife National Study of Adult Day Services, U.S. daycare centres have one direct care worker for every six participants. Nearly 80% of adult daycare centres have a nurse on staff, and nearly 50% have a social worker on staff. Approximately 60% offer case management services. Industry research suggests centres with higher staff-to-patient ratios provide more individualized patient-centered care.

== See also ==
- Assisted living
- Elderly care

== Resources ==
- Brown, E. L., Friedemann, M., & Mauro, A. C. (2014). Use of adult day care service centres in an ethnically diverse sample of older adults. Journal of Applied Gerontology,33(2), 189–206. doi:10.1177/0733464812460431
- McCann, J. J., Hebert, L. E., Li, Y., Wolinsky, F. D., Gilley, D. W., Aggarwal, N. T.. . Evans, D. A. (2005). The effect of adult daycare services on time to nursing home placement in older adults with alzheimer's disease. Gerontologist, 45(6), 754–763. doi:10.1093/geront/45.6.754
- Zarit, S. H., Stephens, M. A. P., Townsend, A., & Greene, R. (1998). Stress reduction for family caregivers: Effects of adult day care use. Journals of Gerontology - Series B Psychological Sciences and Social Sciences, 53(5), S267-S277. doi:10.1093/geronb/53B.5.S267
- Georgiou, J., & Hancock, P. (2009). Assessing and improving quality of life indicators and assessments: A case study of an adult daycare centre. Asia Pacific Journal of Health Management, 4(2), 46–56.
