= Multiple disabilities =

United States special education classification

Multiple disabilities is a term for a person with more than one disability. A person with both a sensory disability and a motor disability would qualify. Multiple disabilities involve different combinations of motor, cognitive, sensory, and other impairments. These combinations create special educational and support needs for the individual.

== Characteristics ==
Disabilities vary in number and severity, and often accumulate with age. Those with multiple disabilities are apart of a heterogeneous group. This means that their abilities, personalities, and support needs will vary depending on the individual. Some of the needs include physical, social, medical, and learning support. Specifically in children, they may experience difficulties with communication, learning, social skills, or mobility, depending on the severity of their disabilities.

== Families and support ==
Disabilities such as seizures require deliberate effort to ensure safety at home. Financially, medical/transport fees may burden families. Family members or professional caregivers may be required to ensure safety, with complications increasing with the number of disabilities.

Families and professionals often work together to identify the supports and services needed by individuals with multiple disabilities. The combination and severity of the disabilities will affect each individual differently, so the support should be based on the individuals needs.

== Education and support ==
In the classroom the support for students with multiple disabilities can look different depending on the severity. Some of these supports include IEPs or 504s; sometimes these supports are given to students in general education classrooms. Effective inclusion requires teachers to provide instructional practices and supports that address the individual needs of students with multiple disabilities. Because students with multiple disabilities can have very different needs, the collaboration between general education and special education teachers is crucial to provide the appropriate support.

== United States ==
In the United States, the term names a special education classification under which students are eligible for services through the Individuals with Disabilities Education Act, or IDEA.

In some states, legislation specified that to qualify, at least one of a student's disabilities must be intellectual disability. Individuals classified as having multiple disabilities usually have more than one significant disability, such as orthopedic impairment, sensory impairment, and/or behavioral or emotional issues. Under the IDEA, students are labeled with multiple disabilities when their educational disabilities require more than the services that are available for one of their disabilities. For instance, if a student has a developmental disability, emotional disabilities, and a visual impairment, they may be classified as having multiple disabilities. However, not every student who has more than one disability receives this classification.
