= Timeline of disability rights outside the United States =

This disability rights timeline lists events outside the United States, United Kingdom, Canada, and Japan relating to the civil rights of people with disabilities, including court decisions, the passage of legislation, activists' actions, significant abuses of people with disabilities, and the founding of various organizations. Although the disability rights movement itself began in the 1960s, advocacy for the rights of people with disabilities started much earlier and continues to the present.

== Prior to the 1700s ==
- Ancient Greece – A pharmakós (Greek: φαρμακός, plural pharmakoi) in ancient Greek religion was the ritualistic sacrifice or exile of a human scapegoat or victim. A physically disabled person, a slave or a criminal was chosen and expelled from the community at times of disaster (famine, invasion or plague) or at times of calendrical crisis. It was believed that this would bring about purification. On the first day of the Thargelia, a festival of Apollo at Athens, two men, the Pharmakoi, were led out as if to be sacrificed as an expiation. Some scholia state that pharmakoi were actually sacrificed (thrown from a cliff or burned), but many modern scholars reject this, arguing that the earliest source for the pharmakos (the iambic satirist Hipponax) shows the pharmakoi being beaten and stoned, but not executed. A more plausible explanation would be that sometimes they were executed and sometimes not, depending on the attitude of the victim. For instance, a deliberate unrepentant murderer would most likely be put to death.

== 1700s ==
- 1729 – In 1729 punishment was recommended for people with physical disabilities, whether they were born with disabilities or acquired them later in life, who appeared in public. These concepts were covered by what were colloquially known as "Ugly Laws".

== 1800s ==
- 1817 – The Asylums for Lunatic Poor (Ireland) Act 1817 (57 Geo. 3. c. 106) made legislative provisions of public asylums for all of Ireland.
- 1871 – The Lunacy Regulation (Ireland) Act 1871 was created to manage and protect the estate of "lunatics". It was repealed by the Assisted Decision-Making (Capacity) Bill 2013.

== 1900s ==
- 1902 – From the early 1880s until the 1970s, American cities had unsightly beggar ordinances known colloquially as ugly laws. These laws deemed it illegal for "any person, who is diseased, maimed, mutilated or deformed in any way, so as to be an unsightly or disgusting object, to expose himself to public view." In 1902, an ugly law similar to that of the United States was enacted in the City of Manila in the Philippines. This law was similar to those of the United States, being written in English and during a time when Manila was under American control, and included the common phrasing "no person who is diseased". This was one of the first ordinances to be written under American control. Other ordinances dealt with hygiene reform and considered unsightly beggars part of this indicative.
- 1909 – Regulations were introduced at the Cantonal Asylum in Bern, which allowed those deemed 'unfit' and with strong sexual inclinations, including some disabled people, to be mandatorily sterilized. In a particular instance, several men and women, including epileptics, were castrated, some of whom voluntarily requested it.

== 1930s ==
- 1933 – The Law for the Prevention of Genetically Diseased Offspring (Ger. "Gesetz zur Verhütung erbkranken Nachwuchses") or "Sterilisation Law" was a statute in Nazi Germany enacted on July 14, 1933 (and made active in January 1934) which allowed the compulsory sterilisation of any citizen who in the opinion of a "Genetic Health Court" (Gr. Erbgesundheitsgericht) had a list of alleged genetic disorders – many of which were not, in fact, genetic. The elaborate interpretive commentary on the law was written by three dominant figures in the racial hygiene movement: Ernst Rüdin, Arthur Gütt and the lawyer Falk Ruttke. The law itself was based on a 'model' American law developed by Harry H. Laughlin. There were three amendments by 1935, most making minor adjustments to how the statute operated or clarifying bureaucratic aspects (such as who paid for the operations). The most significant changes allowed the Higher Court to renounce a patient's right to appeal, and to fine physicians who did not report patients who they knew would qualify for sterilisation under the law. Along with the law, Adolf Hitler personally decriminalised abortion in case of fetuses having racial or hereditary defects for doctors, while the abortion of healthy "pure" German, "Aryan" unborn remained strictly forbidden.
- 1934 – 1975: Compulsory sterilisation in Sweden (Swedish: Tvångssterilisering i Sverige) occurred between 1934 and 1975. Originally the aim of the sterilisation policy was to protect society and it targeted the so-called feeble-minded or other individuals who were considered unfit; from the 1950s and onwards the law came to be used mostly in the interest of the individual, for social or medical reasons, under varying degrees of pressure from doctors and social workers. Two indications for compulsory sterilisation were: 1. Eugenic indication meant sterilisation could be done if a person's offspring would receive undesired genes for insanity, severe illness or physical handicap of other kind. 2. Social indication allowed sterilisation for someone evidently unsuitable to foster a child due to mental illness, being feebleminded or other distortion of the psyche, or having an asocial lifestyle. According to the 2000 governmental report, 21,000 people were estimated to have been forcibly sterilised, and 6,000 were coerced into a 'voluntary' sterilisation while the nature of a further 4,000 cases could not be determined. The Swedish state subsequently paid out damages to victims who contacted the authorities and asked for compensation.
- 1939 – 1945: Aktion T4 (German, pronounced [akˈtsi̯oːn teː fiːɐ]) was the postwar designation for a programme of mass murder through involuntary euthanasia in Nazi Germany, which ran officially from September 1939 to August 1941, during which the recorded 70,273 people were killed at various extermination centres located at psychiatric hospitals in Germany and Austria, along with those in occupied Poland. About half of the victims were from church-run asylums. Under the programme certain German physicians were authorized to select patients "deemed incurably sick, after most critical medical examination" and then administer to them a "mercy death" (Gnadentod). In October 1939 Adolf Hitler signed a "euthanasia decree" backdated to 1 September 1939 that authorized Reichsleiter Philipp Bouhler, the chief of his Chancellery, (not the Reich Chancellery Reichskanzlei) and Karl Brandt, Hitler's personal physician, to carry out the killing. After the nominal end of the programme, physicians in German and Austrian facilities continued many of the practices of Aktion T4, until the defeat of Germany in 1945. Robert Lifton and Michael Burleigh estimated that twice the official number of T4 victims may have perished before the end of the war. The estimated range now is between 200,000 and 250,000 unofficial victims of the policy upon the arrival of Allied troops in Germany.

== 1940s ==
- 1945 – 1955: The Vipeholm experiments were a series of human experiments where patients of Vipeholm Hospital for intellectually disabled people in Lund, Sweden, were fed large amounts of sweets to provoke dental caries (1945–1955). The experiments were sponsored both by the sugar industry and the dentist community, in an effort to determine whether carbohydrates affected the formation of cavities. The experiments provided extensive knowledge about dental health and resulted in enough empirical data to link the intake of sugar to dental caries. However, today they are considered to have violated the principles of medical ethics.
- 1946 – In this year, newly reconstructed German courts tried members of the Hadamar psychiatric hospital staff for the murders of nearly 15,000 German citizens at the facility. Adolf Wahlmann and Irmgard Huber, the chief physician and the head nurse, were convicted.
- 1948 – In December 1946 an American military tribunal (commonly called the Doctors' trial) prosecuted 23 German doctors and administrators for their roles in war crimes and crimes against humanity. These crimes included the systematic killing of those deemed "unworthy of life", including people who had mental disabilities, were institutionalized for their mentally ill, and who had physical impairments. After 140 days of proceedings, including the testimony of 85 witnesses and the submission of 1,500 documents, in August 1947 the court pronounced 16 of the defendants guilty. Seven were sentenced to death and executed on 2 June 1948.

== 1950s ==
- 1950 – The USSR officially banned the procedure of lobotomy in 1950, on the initiative of Vasily Gilyarovsky.
- 1954 - World Leprosy Day was started in 1954 to draw awareness to those affected by leprosy.

== 1960s ==
- 1962 – 1979: Deep sleep therapy was practised (in combination with electroconvulsive therapy and other therapies) by Harry Bailey between 1962 and 1979 in Sydney, at the Chelmsford Private Hospital. As practised by Bailey, deep sleep therapy involved long periods of barbiturate-induced unconsciousness. It was prescribed for various conditions ranging from schizophrenia to depression to obesity, premenstrual stress syndrome and addiction. As a result, twenty-six patients died at Chelmsford Private Hospital during the 1960s and 1970s. After the failure of the agencies of medical and criminal investigation to tackle complaints about Chelmsford, a series of articles in the early 1980s in the Sydney Morning Herald and television coverage on 60 Minutes exposed the abuses at the hospital, including 24 deaths from the treatment. That forced the authorities to take action, and the Chelmsford Royal Commission was appointed. The Citizens Commission on Human Rights, a front group of the Church of Scientology, was an advocate for victims; it received documents from the hospital, copied by a nurse, "Rosa". In 1978, Sydney psychiatrist Brian Boettcher had convened a meeting of doctors working at Chelmsford and found there was little support for deep sleep therapy (Bailey did not attend). However, the treatment continued to be used into 1979.
- 1965–1976: Aid for the Elderly in Government Institutions (AEGIS) was a British pressure group that campaigned to improve the care of older people in long-stay wards of National Health Service psychiatric hospitals. The group was founded by Barbara Robb in 1965, and was active until Robb's death in 1976.

== 1970s ==
- 1970s – By the 1970s, numerous countries had banned the procedure of lobotomy.
- 1970 – A large criminal trial regarding thalidomide was held in Germany, charging several Grünenthal officials with negligent homicide and injury. After Grünenthal settled with the victims in April 1970, the trial ended in December 1970 with no finding of guilt; however, as part of the settlement, Grünenthal paid 100 million DM into a special foundation. The German government added 320 million DM. The foundation paid victims a one-time sum of 2,500–25,000 DM (depending on severity of disability) and a monthly stipend of 100–450 DM. The monthly stipends have since been raised substantially and are now paid entirely by the government (as the foundation has run out of money). Grünenthal paid another 50 million Euros into the foundation in 2008.
- 1972 – ADAPT – Able Disable All People Together (formerly known as The Spastics Society of India), India's most noted non-profit and a non-governmental organization (NGO) working for neuro-muscular and developmental disabilities, was started on 2 October 1972 by Mithu Alur, to provide education and treatment services for children with cerebral palsy. Today it has broadened its scope to include programs on teacher training and vocational training of young adults with cerebral palsy, autism, intellectual disabilities, multiple disabilities, and learning disabilities. It also works in the field of advocacy and awareness and offers support to parents and other professionals. It has led to the formation of independent Spastic societies in 16 states in India. In 1999, it established the National Resource Centre for Inclusion (NRCI), in Mumbai, to include disabled children from special schools into non-special schools.
- 1972 - Vic Finkelstein and Paul Hunt founded Union of the Physically Impaired Against Segregation (UPIAS).
- 1978 – The Basaglia Law or Law 180 (Italian: Legge Basaglia, Legge 180) is the Italian Mental Health Act of 1978 which signified a large reform of the psychiatric system in Italy, contained directives for the closing down of all psychiatric hospitals and led to their gradual replacement with a whole range of community-based services, including settings for acute in-patient care. The Basaglia Law is the basis of Italian mental health legislation. The principal proponent of Law 180 and its architect was Italian psychiatrist Franco Basaglia. Therefore, Law 180 is known as the "Basaglia Law" from the name of its promoter. The Parliament of Italy enacted Law 180 on May 13, 1978, and thereby initiated the gradual dismantling of psychiatric hospitals. Implementation of the psychiatric reform law was accomplished in 1998 which marked the very end of the state psychiatric hospital system in Italy.
- 1978 - In Melbourne, Australia, members of the Disabled People’s Action Forum and other groups campaigned for improved building access by blockading government offices and a cinema to show what a lack of accessibility entailed.
- 1979 - The opening of the Eastern Suburbs Railway in Sydney, Australia, a railway not accessible to people with disabilities, was interrupted by disability rights protestors. Subsequently, video of abuse of the protestors was shown in the media, after which the Premier and state government began arrangements for accessible taxis and transportation subsidies.

== 1980s ==
- The cripple tribunal in Dortmund on 13 December 1981 was one of the main protest actions of the autonomous German disability movement (in confrontation with the established disability assistance) against human rights abuses in nursing homes and psychiatric hospitals, and as well against deficiencies of the local public-transport. Analogous to the Russell Tribunal by Amnesty International, the cripple tribunal denounced human rights violations of disabled people.
- 1981 – The United Nations established this year as the International Year of Disabled Persons. At the conclusion of the year the UN called on member nations to establish in their own countries organizations for and about people with disabilities.
- 1981 – Gini Laurie organized the first international conference on post-polio problems.
- 1981 – Argentina enacted "Comprehensive Protection System for the Disabled" in order to give disabled people health care, education, and social security.
- 1982 – The Social Services Act of Sweden implemented in 1982 and since changed many times covers a wide array of people in addition to persons with functional disabilities, including the elderly, children, crime victims, and people that have alcohol or drug addictions. It states that those who are under the age of 65 with a functional disability are able to request services such as a companion to help with errands, special housing options that would allow them to be cared for 24 hours a day, and home help services if they need assistance with personal care.
- 1982 - Batas Pambansa Blg. 344 of the Philippines is an act enhancing the mobility of disabled persons that requires buildings, institutions, establishments and public utilities to install some facilities and other devices. It requires the installation of sidewalks, ramps and railings for people with disabilities in public spaces. It was ratified on December 7, 1982.
- 1983 – The United Nations expanded the International Year of Disabled Persons to the International Decade of Disabled Persons (1983–1992).
- 1985 – The International Polio Network was founded by Gini Laurie, and began advocating for recognition of post-polio syndrome.
- 1986 – Justice Frank Vincent of the Supreme Court of Victoria in Australia ordered a hospital to take "all necessary means" to save a nine-day-old baby boy with spina bifida, rejecting the hospital's view that only "ordinary treatment" should be given. During the case, Justice Vincent ruled that nobody "has any power to determine that the life of any child, however disabled that child may be, will be deliberately taken away from it .... [The law] does not permit any decisions to be made concerning the quality of life, nor does it enable ... any assessment to be made as to the value of any human being." In that case, the grandparents had sought legal means to keep the baby alive, and Justice Vincent made the baby a ward of the court. However, the doctors and hospital did not present their side to the court or provide evidence to explain their recommendation.
- 1987 – Gini Laurie founded the International Ventilator Users Network (IVUN).
- 1989 - This year over 80 disabled persons and supporters coming from the Independent Living movement gathered in Strasbourg, France for a conference on personal assistance. The conference was funded by the German Green party and was an opportunity for members of the Independent Living movement to meet. This meeting resulted in the founding of ENIL – The European Network on Independent Living (ENIL).
- 1989 - Republic Act 6759 of the Philippines, also known as the White Cane Act, declares August 1 of every year as White Cane Safety Day in recognition of the visually impaired people with disabilities' need for assistance and as a reminder for the public of their duty to care for and respect them. The act was ratified on September 18, 1989.

== 1990s ==
- 1990 – China enacted the Law of the People's Republic of China on the Protection of Disabled Persons, which (among other provisions) declared that China must "provide disabled persons with special assistance by adopting supplementary methods and supportive measures with a view to alleviating or eliminating the effects of their disabilities and external barriers and ensuring the realization of their rights...provide special assurance, treatment and pension to wounded or disabled servicemen and persons disabled while on duty or for protecting the interests of the State and people...guarantee the right of disabled persons to education...[and] guarantee disabled persons' right to work," as well as banning discrimination against people with disabilities in employment, engagement, status regularization, promotion, determining technical or professional titles, payment for labor, welfare, labor insurance or in other aspects.
- 1990 – MindFreedom International is an international coalition of over one hundred grassroots groups and thousands of individual members from fourteen nations, based in America and founded in 1990. It was created to advocate against forced medication, medical restraints, and involuntary electroconvulsive therapy. Its stated mission is to protect the rights of people who have been labeled with psychiatric disorders.
- 1991 – Baby M (14 July 1989 – 26 July 1989) was the pseudonym of an Australian girl named Allison who was born with severe birth defects, whose treatment and eventual death caused significant controversy and international discussion about the medical ethics of disabled newborns. Right to Life activists accused her parents and the hospital of murdering the infant, leading to a lengthy legal inquest. In 1991, a hearing into the Baby M case lasted five months. The Deputy Coroner Wendy Wilmoth ruled that Allison had died of natural causes, and chastised the Right to Life group. "The decisions made by her doctors and her parents, and the careful steps taken to ensure these decisions were legally, ethically and morally sound, have been tested and found entirely reasonable and appropriate," Wilmoth stated. The child's parents and the medical staff were exonerated of all wrongdoing.
- 1992 – The Disability Discrimination Act 1992 became law in Australia, and it banned discrimination against people with disabilities in employment, education, access to premises, accommodation, buying or selling land, activities of clubs, sport, administration of Commonwealth laws and programs, provision of goods, and services and facilities.
- 1992 – Secretary of the Department of Health and Community Services v JWB and SMB (Marion's case), is one of the primary cases under Australian law for deciding whether a child has the capacity to make decisions for themselves, and when this is not possible, who may make decisions for them regarding major medical procedures. It largely adopts the views in Gillick v West Norfolk Area Health Authority, a decision of the English House of Lords. It was regarding "Marion", a pseudonym for the 14-year-old girl at the centre of this case, who had intellectual disabilities, severe deafness, epilepsy and other disorders. Her parents, a married couple from the Northern Territory sought an order from the Family Court of Australia authorising them to have Marion undergo a hysterectomy and an oophrectomy (removal of ovaries). The practical effect would be sterilisation and preventing Marion from being able to have children and many of the hormonal effects of adulthood. The High Court of Australia recognised the right of everyone to bodily integrity under national and international law, and made a distinction between therapeutic and non-therapeutic surgical procedures as well as the duty of surrogates to act in the best interests of the incompetent patient. In the case, the High Court ruled that while parents may consent to medical treatment for their children, the authority does not extend to treatment not in the child's best interests. Also, the Court held that if medical treatment has sterilisation as its principal objective, parents do not have the authority to consent on behalf of their child.
- 1992 - Activists in the Australian regional city of Rockhampton hold their first Disability Pub Crawl during which people with disability and allies visit various hotels to rate their accessibility. This becomes an annual event drawing regular media attention and highlighting issues associated with entertainment.
- 1992 – The Disabled Persons Act, Act Number 5 of 1992 was adopted by Zimbabwe. This Act provides for the welfare and rehabilitation of disabled persons, the appointment and functions of a Director for Disabled Persons' Affairs, and the establishment and functions of a National Disability Board. Discrimination against disabled persons in employment, and denial to disabled persons of access to public premises, services and amenities are prohibited.
- 1992 - The Republic Act No. 727 of the Philippines is "an act providing for the rehabilitation, self-development and self-reliance of disabled persons and their integration into the mainstream of society and for other purposes." It outlines the rights and privileges of disabled persons and the prohibition on discrimination against them. It was ratified on March 24, 1992.
- 1992 - The International Day of Persons with Disabilities (December 3) is an international observance promoted by the United Nations since 1992. It was originally called the International Day of Disabled Persons until 2007.
- 1993 – Poland banned abortion except in cases of severe congenital disorders, rape, incest, or threat to the life of the pregnant woman.
- 1993 – New Zealand passed the Human Rights Act 1993, which prohibits discrimination on the basis of physical, intellectual and psychiatric disabilities, except in cases of insurance policies. HIV status is also included within the legislation. Discrimination is banned within accommodation, employment and goods and service provision.
- 1993 - In early 1993, Barbara Lisicki, Alan Holdsworth, and Sue Elsegood became founders of the Disabled People's Direct Action Network (DAN).
- 1993 – Mad Pride is a mass movement of the users of mental health services, former users, and the aligned, which advocates that individuals with mental illness should be proud of their 'mad' identity. It was formed in 1993 in response to local community prejudices towards people with a psychiatric history living in boarding homes in the Parkdale area of Toronto, Ontario, Canada, and an event has been held every year since then in the city except for 1996.
- 1994 – Since 1994, New Zealand has protected the rights of disabled people under the Health and Disability Commissioner Act, including rights to respect, freedom from discrimination and coercion, dignity, communication in a language the resident can understand, information and informed consent, and right of complaint.
- 1994–1998: Study 329 was a clinical trial conducted in North America from 1994 to 1998 to study the efficacy of paroxetine, an SSRI anti-depressant, in treating 12- to 18-year-olds diagnosed with major depressive disorder. Led by Martin Keller, then professor of psychiatry at Brown University, and funded by the British pharmaceutical company SmithKline Beecham—known since 2000 as GlaxoSmithKline (GSK)—the study compared paroxetine with imipramine, a tricyclic antidepressant, and placebo (an inert pill). SmithKline Beecham had released paroxetine in 1991, marketing it as Paxil in North America and Seroxat in the UK. The drug attracted sales of $11.7 billion in the United States alone from 1997 to 2006, including $2.12 billion in 2002, the year before it lost its patent. Published in July 2001 in the Journal of the American Academy of Child and Adolescent Psychiatry (JAACAP), which listed Keller and 21 other researchers as co-authors, study 329 became controversial when it was discovered that the article had been ghostwritten by a PR firm hired by SmithKline Beecham; had made inappropriate claims about the drug's efficacy; and had downplayed safety concerns. The controversy led to several lawsuits and strengthened calls for drug companies to disclose all their clinical research data.
- 1995 – In 1995 Leilani Muir sued the Province of Alberta for forcing her to be sterilized against her will and without her permission under the Sexual Sterilization Act of Alberta in 1959, when she was institutionalized at the Provincial Training School for Mental Defectives. Since Muir's case, the Alberta government has apologized for the forced sterilization of over 2,800 people under the Act. Nearly 850 Albertans who were sterilized under the Sexual Sterilization Act were awarded C$142 million in damages.
- 1995 - The Persons With Disabilities (Equal Opportunities, Protection of Rights and Full Participation) Act, 1995 was enacted in India.
- 1995 - Members of Disability Action on Rights and Equity (DARE) carried out five hours of blockading in Melbourne, Australia to demand improved access to public transport. Two groups handcuffed and thumbcuffed themselves to trams while a group of wheelchair users shut down an intersection for 30 minutes by forming a line across the street. Following similar protests and further campaigning the state government began to make some improvements in transport accessibility but further protests have been held in the decades since.
- 1999 – ADAPT – Able Disable All People Together established the National Resource Centre for Inclusion (NRCI), in Mumbai, to include disabled children from special schools into non-special schools.

== 2000s ==
- 2004 - 300 people with disability, their carers and families rallied against cuts to Adult, Training, Learning and Support Programs and other services in Lismore, Australia. A week later the NSW Opposition’s Aging, Community, Disability and Youth Services spokesperson was met with a demonstration when he arrived in Albury. These were part of rolling protests against the New South Wales government state government, including a rally of hundreds of people in Newcastle, which led the government to withdraw cuts to a Post-Schools Options Disability Program.
- 2004 – In the case HL v UK (45508/99) the European Court of Human Rights found that the informal admission to a psychiatric hospital of a compliant but incapacitated adult was in contravention of Article 5 of the European Convention on Human Rights. The court found that the distinction between actual and potential detention relied upon by the UK House of Lords in their ruling that HL had not been detained in R v Bournewood Community and Mental Health NHS Trust was not of central importance under Article 5. The European Court also held that the practice of informal admission of compliant but incapacitated adults who were de facto detained was not 'in accordance with a procedure described by law' and thus was not lawful under the convention. The case resulted in major changes to the admission procedures for incapacitated adults to care homes and hospitals in the UK where they are, or may be, deprived of their liberty (see Deprivation of Liberty Safeguards).
- 2005 - Autistic Pride Day was first celebrated in 2005, by Aspies For Freedom (AFF), who selected 18 June because it was the birthday of the youngest member of the group at that time.
- 2005 – New Zealand established a reconciliation initiative in 2005 to address the ongoing compensation payouts to ex-patients of state-run mental institutions in the 1970s to 1990s. A number of grievances were heard, including: poor reasons for admissions; unsanitary and overcrowded conditions; lack of communication to patients and family members; physical violence and sexual misconduct and abuse; inadequate mechanisms for dealing with complaints; pressures and difficulties for staff, within an authoritarian hierarchy based on containment; fear and humiliation in the misuse of seclusion; over-use and abuse of ECT, psychiatric medications, and other treatments as punishments, including group therapy, with continued adverse effects; lack of support on discharge; interrupted lives and lost potential; and continued stigma, prejudice, and emotional distress and trauma. There were some references to instances of helpful aspects or kindnesses despite the system. Participants were offered counselling to help them deal with their experiences, along with advice on their rights, including access to records and legal redress.
- 2005 – The Dutch Supreme Court fully upheld a wrongful life claim in the Netherlands' first wrongful life case ever. Wrongful life is the name given to a legal action in which someone is sued by a severely disabled child (through the child's legal guardian) for failing to prevent the child's birth.
- 2006 – World Down Syndrome Day (WDSD) is marked each year on March 21, beginning in 2006. The 21st day of March (the 3rd month of the year) was selected to signify the uniqueness of the triplication (trisomy) of the 21st chromosome which causes Down syndrome.
- 2006 – The Convention on the Rights of Persons with Disabilities (CRPD) was adopted by the United Nations in 2006.
- 2007 - The International Day of Persons with Disabilities (December 3) is an international observance promoted by the United Nations since 1992; it was originally called the International Day of Disabled Persons until 2007.
- 2008–2010: In 2008, the Perm Krai ombudswoman Tatyana Margolina reported that 14 women with disabilities were subjected to compulsory medical sterilization in the Ozyorskiy psychoneurological nursing home whose director was Grigory Bannikov. The sterilizations were performed not on the basis of a mandatory court decision appropriate for them, but only on the basis of the application by the guardian Bannikov. On 2 December 2010, however, the court did not find corpus delicti in the compulsory medical sterilizations performed by his consent.
- 2009 - International Week of the Deaf (IWDeaf) is celebrated annually across the world during the last full week of September since 2009.

== 2010s ==
- 2012 – On 31 August 2012, Grünenthal chief executive Harald F. Stock, PhD, who served as the chief executive officer of Grünenthal GmbH from January 2009 to May 28, 2013, and was also a Member of executive board until May 28, 2013, apologized for the first time for producing thalidomide and remaining silent about the birth defects caused by it. At a ceremony, Stock unveiled a statue of a disabled child to symbolize those harmed by thalidomide and apologized for not trying to reach out to victims for over 50 years. At the time of the apology, there were 5,000 to 6,000 people with the condition still alive. Disability advocates called the apology "insulting" and "too little, too late", and criticized the company for not compensating survivors. They also criticized the company for their claim that no one could have known the harm the drug caused, arguing that there were plenty of red flags at the time.
- 2014 – In May 2014, the World Health Organization, OHCHR, UN Women, UNAIDS, UNDP, UNFPA and UNICEF issued a joint statement on Eliminating forced, coercive and otherwise involuntary sterilization, An interagency statement. The report references the involuntary sterilization of a number of specific population groups. They include among others, people with disabilities, often perceived as asexual. Women with intellectual disabilities are "often treated as if they have no control, or should have no control, over their sexual and reproductive choices". Other rationales include menstrual management for "women who have or are perceived to have difficulties coping with or managing menses, or whose health conditions (such as epilepsy) or behaviour are negatively affected by menses." The report recommends a range of guiding principles for medical treatment, including ensuring patient autonomy in decision-making, ensuring non-discrimination, accountability and access to remedies.
- 2015 – The Inter-American Commission on Human Rights granted precautionary measures to Jessica Liliana Ramirez, who had epidermolysis bullosa, stating that, "The IACHR asks Colombia to adopt the necessary measures in order to preserve the life and personal integrity of the beneficiary, considering the specific aspects of the disease that she faces, with the purpose of ensuring that she has access to proper medical treatment, according to the technical guidances of the Pan-American Health Organization and other international standards that may be applicable," in its ruling.
- 2016 - The first disability pride week in Wellington, New Zealand was held in 2016, and founded by Nick Ruane and Rachel Noble.
- 2016 - The Disability Pride flag represents the Disability Pride Movement. The original Disability Pride flag was created in 2016 by Ann Magill, an American woman with cerebral palsy, and featured a zig-zag or lightning bolt design. After receiving input from people with visually triggering disabilities, the flag was changed in 2021 to have muted colors and straight diagonal stripes.
- 2017 - On December 3, 2017, at the United Nations' International Day of Persons with Disabilities, parliamentarians from Latin American countries gathered in a plenary assembly in Peru, and by acclamation, they declared the Gold-Silver-Bronze flag to be the symbol of all people with disabilities. On the same day, the flag was handed over to the European headquarters of the United Nations.

== Africa ==
=== 21st century ===
- 2023 - The Anti-Homosexuality Act, 2023, of Uganda, prescribes life imprisonment for sex between two people of the same biological sex and the death penalty for "aggravated homosexuality". The latter offense includes sex with the disabled and mentally ill, as well as sex with persons older than seventy-five, "serial offenders", same-sex rape, sex in a position of authority or procured by intimidation, and homosexual acts committed by a person with a previous conviction of homosexuality.

== Asia ==
=== 2010s ===
- 2011 – Aruna Shanbaug (1 June 1948 – 18 May 2015), alternatively spelled Shanbhag, was an Indian nurse who was at the centre of attention in a court case on euthanasia after spending 42 years in a vegetative state as a result of sexual assault. In 1973, while working as a junior nurse at King Edward Memorial Hospital, Parel, Mumbai, Shanbaug was sexually assaulted by a ward boy, Sohanlal Bhartha Walmiki, and remained in a vegetative state following the assault. On 24 January 2011, after she had been in this state for 37 years, the Supreme Court of India responded to the plea for euthanasia filed by journalist Pinki Virani, by setting up a medical panel to examine her. The court rejected the petition on 7 March 2011. However, in its landmark opinion, it allowed passive euthanasia in India.
- 2011 - The Korean National Assembly passed the "Dogani Law" (named after the Korean name of the film Silenced), removing any statute of limitations for sexual assault against children under 13 and disabled people. It also raised the maximum sentence for rape of young children and disabled people to up to life in prison, and abolished a clause requiring that victims prove they were "unable to resist" due to their disability.
- 2012 – The Supreme Court of India declared that a deaf and mute person need not be prevented from being presented as a witness in court merely on account of their physical disability. The court explained that a deaf and mute person can testify in writing or through gestures.
- 2013 – Turkey officially removed words considered insulting to people with disabilities (such as "gimp" and "faulty") from over 95 of its laws.
- 2013 – Guide dogs began to be allowed at the Western Wall, due to a new ruling by Western Wall Rabbi Shmuel Rabinovitch.
- 2016 - The Rights of Persons with Disabilities Act, 2016 is the disability legislation passed by the Indian Parliament to fulfill its obligation to the United Nations Convention on the Rights of Persons with Disabilities, which India ratified in 2007. The Act replaced the existing Persons With Disabilities (Equal Opportunities, Protection of Rights and Full Participation) Act, 1995. It came into effect on 28 December 2016. This law recognizes 21 disabilities.
- 2016 - The Republic Act No. 10754 is an expansion of the benefits and privileges of people with disabilities in the Philippines as an amendment to the Republic Act No. 7277. It highlights the basic and societal benefits and privileges of people with disabilities. It was signed on December 1, 2016.
- 2017 – Nepal banned blind people and double amputees from climbing its mountains, including but not limited to Mount Everest. In 2018 the Supreme Court of Nepal overturned the ban.

=== 2020s ===
- 2020 - China lowered the age of criminal responsibility to 12 years old for "abominable" crimes, including but not limited to causing injury that leads to severe disabilities by extremely cruel means.
- 2021 - The Supreme Court of Pakistan ruled that prisoners with serious mental health problems cannot receive the death penalty.

== Australia ==
=== 21st century ===
- 2012 – On 17 July 2012, Lynette Rowe of Australia (who was born without limbs due to thalidomide) was awarded an out-of-court settlement, believed to be in the millions of dollars and paving the way for class action victims to receive further compensation.
- 2013 - The Australian government legislates the National Disability Insurance Scheme to fund a number of supports.This followed a nationwide campaign involving hundreds of thousands of people, including rallies in 2012 during which 20 000 people with disability and their supporters rallied in six major cities across Australia.
- 2019 - Following campaigning, including a protest inside parliament house, the Australian government is forced to establish the Royal Commission into Violence, Abuse, Neglect and Exploitation of People with Disability.
- 2020 - The Australian National Disability Insurance Scheme (NDIS) begins to fund costs associated with disability. The scheme was legislated in 2013 and went into full operation in 2020. The scheme is administered by the National Disability Insurance Agency (NDIA) and overseen by the NDIS Quality and Safeguards Commission (NDIS Commission). A campaign followed in 2020-21 during which the organisation Every Australian Counts successfully campaigned against government plans to restrict access to the scheme.

== Europe ==
=== 2000s ===
- 2006 – Piergiorgio Welby, an Italian poet, painter and activist, led a three-month-long battle to establish his right to die. Welby was diagnosed with muscular dystrophy as a teenager in the early 1960s. The disease progressed, and in 1997 he became unable to breathe on his own. He became politically active in the right-to-die movement, and in 2006 he publicly declared his wish to refuse the medical treatment that kept him alive. The case was controversial, with liberal politicians supporting him and conservatives and the Vatican speaking out against his cause. After three months, he was allowed to die, though he was denied a church burial.
- 2006 – The high court in Lausanne, Switzerland, in a 2006 ruling, granted an anonymous individual with longstanding psychiatric difficulties the right to end his own life.
- 2007 – Giovanni Nuvoli was an Italian former football referee who had hadamyotrophic lateral sclerosis since 2001. With the help of Associazione Luca Coscioni, he fought for his right to die but his attempted euthanasia was blocked by the authorities on February 13, 2007. He started a hunger strike on July 16, 2007, and he subsequently died on July 23.
- 2009 – Eluana Englaro (25 November 1970 – 9 February 2009) was an Italian woman from Lecco, who entered a persistent vegetative state on 18 January 1992, following a car accident, and subsequently became the focus of a court battle between supporters and opponents of euthanasia. Shortly after her accident, medical staff began feeding Englaro with a feeding tube, but her father "fought to have her feeding tube removed, saying it would be a dignified end to his daughter's life. He said that before the crash his daughter visited a friend who was in a coma and told him she didn't want the same thing to happen to her if she were ever in the same state." The authorities refused his request, but the decision was finally reversed in 2009, after she had spent seventeen years in the persistent vegetative state.

=== 2010s ===
- 2010 - On 20 May 2010, the European Court of Human Rights (ECtHR) ruled in Alajos Kiss v. Hungary (38832/06) that Hungary cannot restrict voting rights only on the basis of guardianship due to a psychosocial disability. The ECtHR awarded Mr. Kiss with EUR 3,000.
- 2013 – The Irish Assisted Decision-Making (Capacity) Bill 2013 repealed the Marriage of Lunatics Act, 1811 and the Lunacy Regulation (Ireland) Act 1871.
- 2014 – The German national memorial to the people with disabilities systematically murdered by the Nazis was dedicated in 2014 in Berlin. It is located in Berlin in a site next to the Tiergarten park, which is the former location of a villa at Tiergartenstrasse 4 where more than 60 Nazi bureaucrats and doctors worked in secret under the "T4" program to organize the mass murder of sanatorium and psychiatric hospital patients deemed unworthy to live.
- 2014 – The European Court of Justice ruled that if obesity hinders "full and effective participation in professional life," it could count as a disability. Discrimination on the grounds of disability is illegal under European Union law. This ruling came in the case of Karsten Kaltoft, a Danish child-minder who said he was unfairly fired for being fat.
- 2016 - Disability Pride Brighton was started in 2016 by Jenny Skelton after her daughter, Charlie, suffered an incident of disability discrimination in Brighton. Jenny posted on Facebook about the incident along with the final line of text "Disability Pride anyone?" The Facebook post went viral and was then picked up by the media. After receiving hundreds of messages from other disabled people who had experienced similar incidents, she decided to proceed with the idea. A year later in 2017 the first Disability Pride Brighton festival was held on New Road in Brighton, England with an attendance of approximately 2000 people.
- 2018 – In April 2018, Polish protesters organized by Iwona Hartwich participated in a 40-day protest against treatment and social services afforded to persons with disabilities in Poland. The protests were suspended due to a crackdown on protestors by the parliamentary guard. Ultimately, the protests succeeded in achieving one of four demands: an increase in social allowance for disabled persons.
- 2019 - Before the May 2019 EU elections, most EU member states adopted laws which enabled all persons with disabilities to be able to vote, in line with Article 29 of the CRPD. Some states did not, and the infringement procedure was initiated at the European Commission.

=== 2020s ===
- 2020 - Poland's constitutional court ruled that abortion due to fetal defects was unconstitutional.
- 2021 - Spain legalized assisted suicide and euthanasia for those with serious and incurable or debilitating diseases who wish it.
- 2021 - Toplak and Mrak v. Slovenia (34591/19, 42545/19) of 26 October 2021, is the European Court of Human Rights judgment in which the court held that voters' rights were violated when they had no legal right to ask for accessible polling places in advance to achieve accessibility before the election day. The ruling is also significant because the court for the first time extended its jurisdiction to referendums.
- 2023 - An amendment to the constitution of the Netherlands was approved, forbidding discrimination against a person based on their disability or sexual orientation.

== South America ==
- 2006 - In Brazil, a 2006 federal decree requires allowance of guide dogs in all public and open to public places.
