= Victor White (priest) =

English Dominican priest

Victor Francis White, OP (1902–1960) was an English Dominican priest who corresponded and collaborated with Carl Gustav Jung. He was initially deeply attracted to Jung's psychology, but when Jung's Answer to Job was published in English, he gave it a very critical review. White's works include Soul and Psyche, God and the Unconscious, and God The Unknown. Jung and White enjoyed a series of correspondence, and Jung was so impressed with some of White's ideas that he invited White to his retreat house at Bollingen, where only Jung's very close friends were allowed. The correspondence between Jung and White has been published by Lammers and Cunningham (2007). While White was a great admirer of Jung, he was at times very critical of Jung. For example, he criticised Jung's essay "On the Self", and accused Jung of being too bound to a Manichaean dualism. He was also somewhat critical of Jung's Kantianism. At the same time, Jung was quite critical of White, for example, over his commitment to the doctrine of privatio boni as means of understanding the problem of evil.

== Letters ==
When Jung published Answer to Job, and again when it was published in English, White's fellow Roman Catholics reacted and what was once a ripple became a tidal wave. The Book of Job, a Wisdom book of the Bible, explores the problem of evil. White's correspondence with Jung made Jung refer to him as "my white raven", inasmuch as he was the only theologian who really understood something of the problem of psychology in the present world. He invited him to his retreat in Bollingen.

White followed the Classical philosophy and Thomistic theology that defined evil as the absence of good (privatio boni). God, the ever-existing being, is himself good, whereas evil did not exist until it took origin in the devil and man.

Jung's thought was that evil is not the absence of anything, but the active and dramatically impressive presence of something, personified and named the Devil. Evil ought to be considered a real force, not written-off as an opposite. For Jung a dogma could not be valid unless backed by empirical evidence, showing that it is prime, anything else had to be a dodge.

According to some, Jung's greatest letters were written to White.

Jung could see no evidence of privatio boni, but plenty of evil – devils, demons and other evil characters. The two, good and evil, are locked in an eternal duel for supremacy. Thus if one believes in just one God, He must contain the two within Himself.

White could not accept this and just stated: God is light; in Him there is no darkness.(1John1:5–7).

The conflict produced the Answer to Job, which some say is Jung's best work.

White published a review of Answer to Job in the journal Blackfriars in March 1955. It was clear from this review that by this stage, White's feelings on the book were ambivalent, and he even seems to have had mixed feelings about his publication of the review, wondering how Jung would take the review.

Jung, who trained as a psychiatrist at Zurich (First University), shows in his letters the reserved professional at work, yet often gives way to the poet and preacher.

He is clear, though, that it would be beyond the competence of scientific empiricism to talk about the divine entity. He says that he does not preach but attempts to establish psychological facts. He can confirm and prove inter-relationship of the God image with other parts of the psyche, but he cannot go further without committing the error of a metaphysical assertion which is far beyond his scope. He is not a theologian and he has nothing to say about the nature of God.

Their letters also touched on non-theological matters, such as their mutual acquaintance, Barbara Robb, who founded (1965) and organised the highly effective pressure group Aid for the Elderly in Government Institutions (AEGIS).
