= Eunice K. Fiorito =

American disability rights activist and social worker (1930–1999)

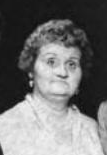
- Eunice K. Fiorito, from a 1979 publication of the U.S. Department of Health, Education, and Welfare, Rehabilitation Services Administration.
- Born: Eunice Kathleen Frelly; October 1, 1930; Chicago, Illinois, US
- Died: November 22, 1999 (aged 69); Alexandria, Virginia, US
- Occupations: Disability rights activist, social worker, government official
- Known for: President, American Coalition of Citizens with Disabilities

Eunice K. Fiorito (October 1, 1930 – November 22, 1999) was an American disability rights activist and social worker. She was president of the American Coalition of Citizens with Disabilities (ACCD).

== Early life and education ==
Eunice Kathleen Frelly was born in Chicago, Illinois, the daughter of Joseph Frelly (born Frelichowski) and Anna C. Rutkowski Frelly. She became blind in her teen years. She completed undergraduate studies in education at Loyola University Chicago in 1954, and earned a master's degree in social work at Columbia University in 1960.

== Career ==
Trained as a social worker, Fiorito worked in the Illinois Department of Social Welfare and at the Jewish Guild for the Blind in New York City, where she helped start an outpatient psychiatric clinic for disabled children in the 1960s. She was active in the American Council of the Blind.

In 1970, Fiorito was appointed to the staff of mayor John Lindsay's Committee on the Handicapped, when she developed the idea of a city office for disability issues, especially building employment opportunities. The Mayor's Office of the Handicapped in New York City opened in late 1972, with Fiorito as its first director. "I shall represent the disabled to this government, not this government to the disabled," she declared at her appointment.

Fiorito testified at a Congressional subcommittee meeting on the Supplemental Security Income (SSI) program in 1975. With Judith Heumann, Fred Fay, Ralf Hotchkiss, Lex Frieden, and others, she co-founded the American Coalition of Citizens with Disabilities in 1975, and served as its president, with Frank Bowe as ACCD's executive director. She was one of the leaders of the 504 Sit-In protests in 1977, and her experience working with both government officials and activists was important to the protests' successful resolution. In 1980, she founded the League of Disabled Voters.

Fiorito worked in Washington, D.C. at the Department of Health, Education and Welfare for nineteen years, beginning during the Carter administration. She was vice-chair of the federal task force on Section 504 of the Rehabilitation Act. She retired from government work in 1996, but continued to lead the Alexandria Commission on Persons with Disabilities, and do publicity for the Alexandria League of Women Voters.

== Personal life ==
Eunice K. Frelly married James Fiorito. She died from heart failure in 1999, aged 69 years, at her home in Alexandria, Virginia. Her grave is in Arlington National Cemetery. Her family gave digital magnifiers to "service agencies, libraries, and other organizations" in her memory. There is a Eunice Fiorito Scholarship given by the American Foundation for the Blind and the American Council of the Blind, for blind students studying advocacy or disability services.
