= Albert Kushlick =

Psychiatrist

Albert Kushlick (2 March 1932 – 23 August 1997) was a psychiatrist best known for his advocacy for greater facilities within mainstream communities for adults and children with a learning disability.

== Career ==
He began work in 1956 when he moved to London from South Africa. In London, he worked as a locum house surgeon at St Giles' Hospital and later at Fulham Hospital. Between 1957 and 1958 he was a registrar at South Ockendon Hospital, a hospital for people with a learning disability or mental disorder.

He was known for his work with the Wessex Regional Hospital Board, beginning in 1962, which called for move from a centralised system of mental health treatments in large-scale psychiatric institutions to a focus on local community hospitals and community-based care as well as making sure that non-therapeutic techniques were not used in new or upgraded hospitals. He also advocated the use of halfway houses.

He helped improve care for the elderly and those with disabilities for the Wessex Regional Health Authority and was an honorary senior lecturer at the University of Southampton School of Medicine.

This move from a centralised system to local care units was replicated in many countries.

== Personal life ==
Kushlick was born in South Africa and educated at the Benoni High School in Benoni, Transvaal province, before studying medicine at the University of the Witwatersrand in northern Johannesburg. He worked in a number of South African institutions, including the professorial units of the Princess Nursing Home and the Non-European Hospital, before leaving for London in 1956 after the South African government threatened to imprison him for his work with the anti-apartheid movement and Nelson Mandela.

== Further information ==
A more extensive biography of Albert Kushlick has been published by Citizen Network.
