= Martin Naughton =

Martin Naughton may refer to:

- Martin Naughton (businessman) (1939–2026), Irish businessman
- Martin Naughton (activist) (1954–2016), Irish disability rights campaigner
- Martin Naughton (hurler) (born 1964), former Irish hurler
