= Fiorito =

Fiorito may refer to:

- Villa Fiorito, a city in the Lomas de Zamora Partido of Buenos Aires Province, to the south of central Buenos Aires, Argentina
- Alfredo Fiorito (1953–2024), Argentine-Spanish DJ
- Dan Fiorito (born 1990), American baseball coach
- Eunice K. Fiorito (1930–1999), American disability rights activist
- Joe Fiorito (born 1948), Canadian journalist and author
- John Fiorito (born 1936), American baritone opera singer
- Ted Fio Rito or Fiorito (1900–1971), American composer, orchestra leader, and keyboardist
- Vittorio Paolo Fiorito (1941–2015), Italian basketball referee

Familia Fiorito
