= 2018 Polish disability protests =

Disability rights protest in Warsaw, Poland

The Polish Protest for the Rights of People with Disabilities 2018 was a protest in Warsaw, Poland, led by Polish activists with disabilities in response to the inadequate treatment of persons with disabilities by the Polish government. Activists occupied the Polish Parliament for 38 days, while subsequent protests occurred outside the parliament building.

== Causes ==
Families of disabled children in Poland are left in dire circumstances, as the institutional support for disabled children proves inadequate. Before the protest in 2018, the support offered by the government was as follows:

- Unemployed parents (caretakers) of a person with disabilities received zl 1,407, or approximately 350 euros per month of care allowance.
- All minors with disabilities notwithstanding their parents (caretakers) employments received zl 153, or about 39 euros per month of so-called extra care allowance.
- Every person that was born with a disability or became disabled as a child or a student received zl 774, or around 185 euros per month of social benefit before reaching the age of majority.

"We will never understand why in our country people with disabilities, incapable of independent existence, are condemned to life in poverty and indignity and the state forces them to live on less than zl 900 per month," said Iwona Hartwich, the mother of the 25-year-old disabled Kuba Hartwich and an organizer of the protest, in a press conference following 38 days of the sit-in in the Polish Sejm. "We will never understand, why the current government did not want to assist the weakest segment of society with a modest benefit of zl 00. We came forward with four compromise solutions, yet there was no good will to help people with disabilities in their already difficult life". The conditions deteriorate when children with disabilities reach the age of 18, as at that point their families are no longer entitled to benefits. However, disability does not disappear with age. Oftentimes after a child with disabilities has turned 18, caretakers do not get full-time employment due to the time required to nurse their child, further exasperating the detriments of insufficient support from the Polish government.

Protesters put forward two key demands. First, they demanded the payment of an additional 500 zloty, or 120 euros, every month for persons with disabilities who are not able to live independently upon reaching the age of 18. Second, they demanded the raising of subsidies to the amount of the lowest subsidy of the Polish Social Insurance Institution for persons incapable of working in perpetuity in order to raise the subsidy to the social minimum for a household with a person with disabilities.

== Events ==
The protest started on April 18, 2018, and lasted for 38 days. It occurred inside as well as in front of the Parliament. Conditions provided by the authorities were extremely poor — adults with disabilities and their carers were denied "access to fresh air (ban on opening the windows); their freedom of movement curtailed (the elevators were blocked and they could not leave Parliament building); their basic human needs of proper sanitation were unmet (no access to the bathroom)". The protesters slept on the Parliament's floor, with authorities keeping the lights turned on throughout the night while denying protestors' physiotherapists entry into the building to bring aid. During the protest, a NATO Parliamentary Assembly took place in the building. In order to hide the demonstrators, the ruling party (Law and Justice Party - PiS) placed them behind a thick grey curtain. Before the arrival of international guests, protesting mothers were trying to put up a sign in English saying, "Polish children with disabilities are begging for dignity", which resulted in physical violence from Parliament security. Protesters were also insulted by some of the politicians, such as government spokeswoman Joanna Kopcinska who told them that "most of us have to deal with misfortunes like yours". The mothers replied that their children were not their misfortunes

== Outcomes ==
Minister of Labor Rafalska suggested an agreement which included the rise of the social allowance to the requested amount but did not cover the second postulate about the requested zl 500. Instead of that, the Ministry offered priority lines to some doctors and pharmacies. The protesters rejected the proposal, as they said that their two demands are inextricable. Finally, the government, without the participation of protesters, made an agreement with a group of organizations working for people with disabilities. Although only one of the demands were fulfilled by the government, without doubt the protest increased the visibility of the struggle of disabled people in Poland. The protest was heavily discussed in newspapers and on TV stations for several weeks. Another result of the protest was the enriching of new alliances between activist groups: feminist organizations were one of the main supporters of the protesters. On the other hand, the protest brought to light some Polish politicians' negative perceptions regarding persons with disabilities. Politicians widely commented on the protesters themselves and the type of fighting for rights they chose, e.g. Stanisław Pięta said that the protest was actually a political action with the aim of overthrowing the government, Jacek Żalek stated that children are used by their parents as "live ammunition," and Krystyna Pawlowicz commented on a supposed "extremely bad smell" in the Parliament because of the protest.

== See also ==
- Disability rights movement
- Timeline of disability rights outside the United States
