= American Coalition of Citizens with Disabilities =

The American Coalition of Citizens with Disabilities (ACCD) was, in the mid-1970s to early 1980s, a national consumer-led disability rights organization called, by nationally syndicated columnist Jack Anderson and others, "the handicapped lobby". Created, governed, and administered by individuals with disabilities—which made it a novelty at the time—ACCD rose to prominence in 1977 when it mounted a successful 10-city "sit in" to force the federal government to issue long-overdue rules to carry out Section 504, the world's first disability civil rights provisions. ACCD also earned a place of honor in the disability rights movement when it helped to secure federal funding for what is now a national network of 600 independent living centers and helped to pave the way for accessible Public Transit in the U.S. After a brief and often tumultuous history, ACCD closed its doors in 1983.

== History ==
The origins of ACCD are in local and state consumer-led groups. In 1970, for example, Max Starkloff founded Paraquad, a community living support organization, so that he and other St. Louis residents could move from nursing homes and other institutional facilities into neighborhood homes. That same year, Judith Heumann and others founded Disabled in Action to fight City Hall in New York City. The precursor of the nation's first independent living center was established that year, as well, when Ed Roberts and other students at the University of California – Berkeley wanted personal care and other support services not available at the college. In 1974, Fred Fay was one of the founders of the Boston Center for Independent Living. All of these leaders were among the founders of ACCD in 1974, when 150 activists convened in Washington, DC, during the annual meeting of the President's Committee on Employment of the Handicapped.

Fay was ACCD's first president (1974–1976). Its second was Eunice K. Fiorito (1930–1999), a disability rights activist and head of the Mayor's Office for the Handicapped, in New York City. Tall, red-headed, and fiery, she was a visionary leader who understood how the human and civil rights concerns of individuals with any given disability were, at root, similar to those of persons with other disabilities. Others on the ACCD board during the formative years included Frederick Schreiber, executive director of the US National Association of the Deaf; Roger Petersen, of the American Council of the Blind; and Gini Laurie, editor of the Rehabilitation Gazette; as well as Starkloff, Heumann and Fay. Only Laurie was not a person with a disability.

From 1974 to mid-1976, ACCD was a volunteer organization. Board members paid their own expenses to quarterly meetings, which were held at metropolitan areas around the country in order to expose Board members to local, state and regional issues and to raise the organization's profile. In early 1976, Fay wrote a small grant proposal to the Rehabilitation Services Administration of the federal Health Education and Welfare (HEW) department. The purpose of the grant was to demonstrate coalition building. Grant award in hand, board members launched a search for the first ACCD staff member. Fiorito found him: at a conference in NYC, she heard a speech by Dr. Frank Bowe, a deaf researcher at NYU, and decided that he was the person. At its July 1976 meeting, the board agreed, hiring him as Director. That September, Bowe went to Washington, occupying a one-room office on Connecticut Avenue with an interpreter, Jan Jacobi.

The organization's annual budget in 1976–1977 was $50,000. Four years later, it was $2,000,000. The staff grew to 20, including attorneys, rehabilitation counselors, and educators. Some board members were troubled by the growth. Suspicion was particularly high about funding. When a company donated $10,000 to the coalition, for example, the board spent hours at its next meeting debating whether to issue press releases denouncing that company (to demonstrate ACCD's independence). Other board members wanted the coalition to change its focus, from national advocacy to building up the capabilities of state and local coalitions. In 1981, after five years at the helm, Bowe departed. He was succeeded as Director by Reese Robrahn, a blind attorney. In 1983, its funds having dwindled to virtually nothing, the organization closed its doors. Explanations for its demise vary. The Reagan Administration was not interested in making grants to civil rights groups. Meanwhile, each disability group in the coalition—people with physical disabilities, the deaf, the blind, and individuals with cognitive limitations—responded to the threat posed by the Administration by retreating to protect its base.

== Membership ==
In November 1976, ACCD had 21 organizational members. A year later, it had 60. During the same period, individual membership rose 500%. Representatives of the groups came to Washington once a year in a Delegate Council. These annual sessions revolved around resolutions, or broad goals for ACCD to pursue in the coming year, election of board members, and adoption of amendments to the bylaws. Meetings often were contentious. The delegates passionately viewed ACCD as "our organization" as opposed to professional associations that were run by persons without disabilities. The movement was young and emotions were raw. Basic governing rules were invented on the fly, keeping parliamentarian Louis Rigdon, an attorney with the U.S. Department of Justice, constantly busy trying to maintain some semblance of order. A bone of contention was the permissibility of individual memberships. Some argued that individuals should belong, instead, to state and local groups, with ACCD having only organizational members; others noted that the Coalition needed funds and that even at $5/year the dues of individual members helped. As for individual members with no disabilities, resolutions were actually introduced, and seriously considered, to limit them to three-fifths of a vote. The use of the Constitution's original Article 1, Section II language was deliberate. Probably, the effort was an indication of long-festering inequalities and of the sense that ACCD "belongs to people with disabilities". Meanwhile, delegates ordered the staff to work on a wide swath of issues, ranging from transportation to housing to education and civil rights, blithely ignoring time and budgetary constraints on carrying them out.

== Actions ==
ACCD's first major accomplishment was the issuance, in April 1977, of final regulations carrying out Section 504 of the 1973 Rehabilitation Act. The coalition's national advocacy effort, culminating in a raucous 10-city sit in, including a record 25 days at the San Francisco HEW building, has had lasting effects. Section 504 requires non-discrimination on the basis of disability of any organization or agency that receives any federal funds, for any purpose. The 1990 Americans with Disabilities Act extended Section 504's reach to the private sector, as well. Experts believe there would be no ADA had there not first been Section 504.

After its success with Section 504, ACCD mounted projects to train individuals with disabilities about their new rights and to educate officials on their new responsibilities. Accessible public transportation was a major focus of ACCD in 1978. That year, the coalition also demonstrated to prevent a rumored veto by President Carter of the 1978 Rehabilitation Act Amendments. That law provided federal funds for independent living centers. In both transportation and independent living, the seeds ACCD planted were fertile. The 1990 ADA finally mandated access to public transportation. Similarly, the initial handful of centers grew over time to exceed 600. Today, there is one in every city and virtually every county in the nation.

== See also ==
- List of disability rights organizations
- List of consumer organizations
