= Martin Naughton (activist) =

Irish disability rights activist (1954–2016)

- Born: 16 March 1954; Spiddal, County Galway, Ireland
- Died: 13 October 2016 (aged 62)
- Occupation: Disability rights activist
- Known for: Co-founder of Dublin Center for Independent Living; founder of the Freedom Drive; former President of European Network on Independent Living

Martin Naughton (Irish: Máirtín Ó Neachtain; 16 March 1954 – 13 October 2016) was an Irish disability rights activist, born in Spiddal, County Galway, in the Connemara Gaeltacht. Described as a "lifelong campaigner for the rights of the disabled", he was involved in the establishment of the Independent Living Movement in Ireland, a co-founder of the Dublin Center for Independent Living (CIL), and a former president of the European Network on Independent Living (ENIL). Playwright Christian O'Reilly, a friend and former colleague, described him as "the Michael Collins of the disability movement".

== Early life ==
Naughton was the son of Peadar Ó Neachtain and Nora Ó Neachtain (née Feeney). His father had a small farm near Spiddal village and worked as a horseman, offering haulage services and taxiing spectators to the Galway Races.

A native Irish speaker, Naughton was raised in an Irish-speaking household and educated at the national school in Spiddal village. He was the second youngest of ten children, two of whom died before he was born. Three of the children — Naughton, his eldest sister Maureen, and his youngest sister Barbara — were diagnosed with muscular dystrophy (specifically Duchenne muscular dystrophy in Naughton's case), a diagnosis later changed to spinal muscular atrophy in adulthood. Maureen, sixteen years his senior, had a milder form of the condition, remained in Spiddal, and became the local postmistress; she was a major influence on Naughton throughout his life.

== Childhood institutionalisation ==
In 1963, on medical advice, Naughton (aged nine) and his sister Barbara (aged seven) were sent from Spiddal to St Mary's Orthopaedic Hospital for Children in Baldoyle, County Dublin, run by the Sisters of Charity. The hospital was widely known as "The Little Willie". It was common at the time for disabled children to be sent away from their families and communities in this way. Naughton's wheelchair use dated from his early days in Dublin. Arriving with very little English, Naughton had picked up some vocabulary from Radio Luxembourg.

Despite the separation, Naughton retained contact with his family and his parents visited Baldoyle whenever they could and arranged for friends and neighbours to do likewise, and he and Barbara returned home to Spiddal on holidays every year. He later reflected, "I often thought, more with curiosity than regret, how different my life would have been if I'd stayed in Spiddal". He was nonetheless affected by the regimented institutional life and by separation from his community. In March 1968, a volunteer at the hospital organised a visit by Celtic F.C.'s "Lisbon Lions" team and captain Billy McNeill became a role model and later bought Naughton his first electric wheelchair.

As a teenager, Naughton became manager of the hospital football team, founded a hospital sports club, and helped re-establish Baldoyle Football Club. Some of the young disabled athletes he coached went on to compete in the Paralympic Games.

== Early adulthood ==
At 19, Naughton moved to a Cheshire Home in the Phoenix Park, which he described to Leonard Cheshire as "a five-star hotel in the middle of the Sahara Desert". In late 1973, he travelled to Bad Wildbad Rehabilitation Hospital in Germany and Stoke Mandeville Hospital in the UK for a course in sports psychology and rehabilitation, meeting Sir Ludwig Guttmann, founder of the Paralympic Games.

Returning to Dublin, he became Baldoyle Hospital's first recreation manager — its first employee with a significant physical disability — and helped build an integrated youth centre for the village. In January 1982, he moved into a rented house in Baldoyle with a rota of volunteer assistants, and subsequently ran a crash repair and car servicing garage in Kinsealy, County Dublin, for five years.

== American links and Dublin CIL ==
In 1987, Naughton spent time in Boston with his sister Chris and began travelling regularly to the United States. Through the Boston Center for Independent Living, he encountered the model of government-funded personal assistants supporting independent living, which inspired him to campaign for similar supports in Ireland. In the early 1990s. he came close to relocating permanently to Boston, where Chris and her family lived, but returned to Ireland, feeling the campaign his friends were fighting at home needed him.

Naughton helped found Ireland's first Centre for Independent Living in 1990, and in March 1992 the activist group he had been organising in Dublin formally became the Dublin Center for Independent Living (CIL), using the American spelling as a nod to its roots. Founding members included Hubert McCormack, Ursula Hegarty, Michael McCabe, Dermot Walsh, Declan O'Keeffe, Peter Moore, and Catherine Hickey. Writer Christian O'Reilly, who joined CIL as a lobbyist after meeting Naughton in the early 1990s, recalled Naughton describing CIL as "the IRA of disability", whose job was "to create change ... to plant bombs, ... to agitate for change". CIL was distinctive in being run by disabled people themselves, under the guiding principle "nothing for us without us".

In 1993, while on a Morrison visa in Boston, Naughton met activist Fred Fay, along with Justin Dart and Judy Heumann — encounters that convinced him to return to Ireland to continue his advocacy.

== Campaigning for the Personal Assistant service ==
Dublin CIL used Horizon funding to pilot a personal assistant (PA) service for 15 disabled people, followed by "Operation Get Out". On 28 June 1994, around forty CIL activists staged a near 48-hour protest at the gates of Leinster House, leading the Minister for Health, Brendan Howlin, to commit to funding PA programmes pending review. Following a 1995 evaluation report and subsequent negotiations, the PA service became state-funded and available to all disabled people in Ireland by late 1995, allowing disabled people to live in their own homes on their own terms rather than according to institutional routines.

== European Network on Independent Living and the Freedom Drive ==
Naughton was a founding figure of the European Network on Independent Living (ENIL) and later served as its president. In 2003, with the support of the ENIL Board, he founded the Freedom Drive, a biennial advocacy event held in Strasbourg (and, from 2015, Brussels) that brings disabled activists from across Europe together to lobby members of the European Parliament. Naughton and fellow campaigners pledged to return every two years until independent living was a reality for all disabled people in Europe. The Freedom Drive later became one of ENIL's most prominent lobbying and awareness-raising activities.

Following Naughton's death in October 2016 — described by ENIL as a great loss to the organisation and to the independent living movement as a whole — ENIL established the Martin Naughton Youth Memorial Stipend in his honour. The award funds the participation of young disabled activists (aged 18–35) in the Freedom Drive, covering travel, accommodation and the attendance of a personal assistant.

== Later achievements ==
Naughton helped establish CILs across Ireland, co-founded Vantastic (Ireland's first wheelchair-accessible dial-a-ride service), and became the first disabled board member of the Citizens Information Board. He also founded Disability Options and co-founded Áiseanna Tacaíochta.

Working later for the Disability Federation of Ireland, he campaigned for Ireland's ratification of the UN Convention on the Rights of Persons with Disabilities, achieved in March 2018. In March 2016, he was made an adjunct professor at the Centre for Disability Law and Policy, University of Galway.

== Death and legacy ==
Naughton died on 13 October 2016 after a short illness, aged 62. His funeral was held in Baldoyle Church, and he was buried beside his sister Maureen in Spiddal, County Galway. Then-President of Ireland Michael D. Higgins paid tribute to him following his death.

At the time of his death, Naughton had been working on a memoir with writer and documentary maker Joanna Marsden, whom he had approached in 2014 to record the story of his life and campaigning. Marsden completed the book by drawing on her recorded conversations with Naughton together with interviews with his sister Barbara and his friends; it was published in 2024 as Never Know Your Place: Memoir of a Rulebreaker. One of Naughton's favourite sayings, often used in his dealings with politicians and civil servants, was "if it's not in writing, it never happened". His photographs and a portrait by Mary Duffy are held at the University of Galway.

Naughton's life inspired the 2004 film Inside I'm Dancing, although the project diverged substantially from the story originally pitched by his friend, writer Christian O'Reilly. O'Reilly later returned to Naughton's story with the play No Magic Pill (2022), which deliberately cast only disabled actors and was developed in partnership with Independent Living Movement Ireland, the Irish Wheelchair Association, and the Disability Federation of Ireland.
