= Iwona Hartwich =

Polish politician

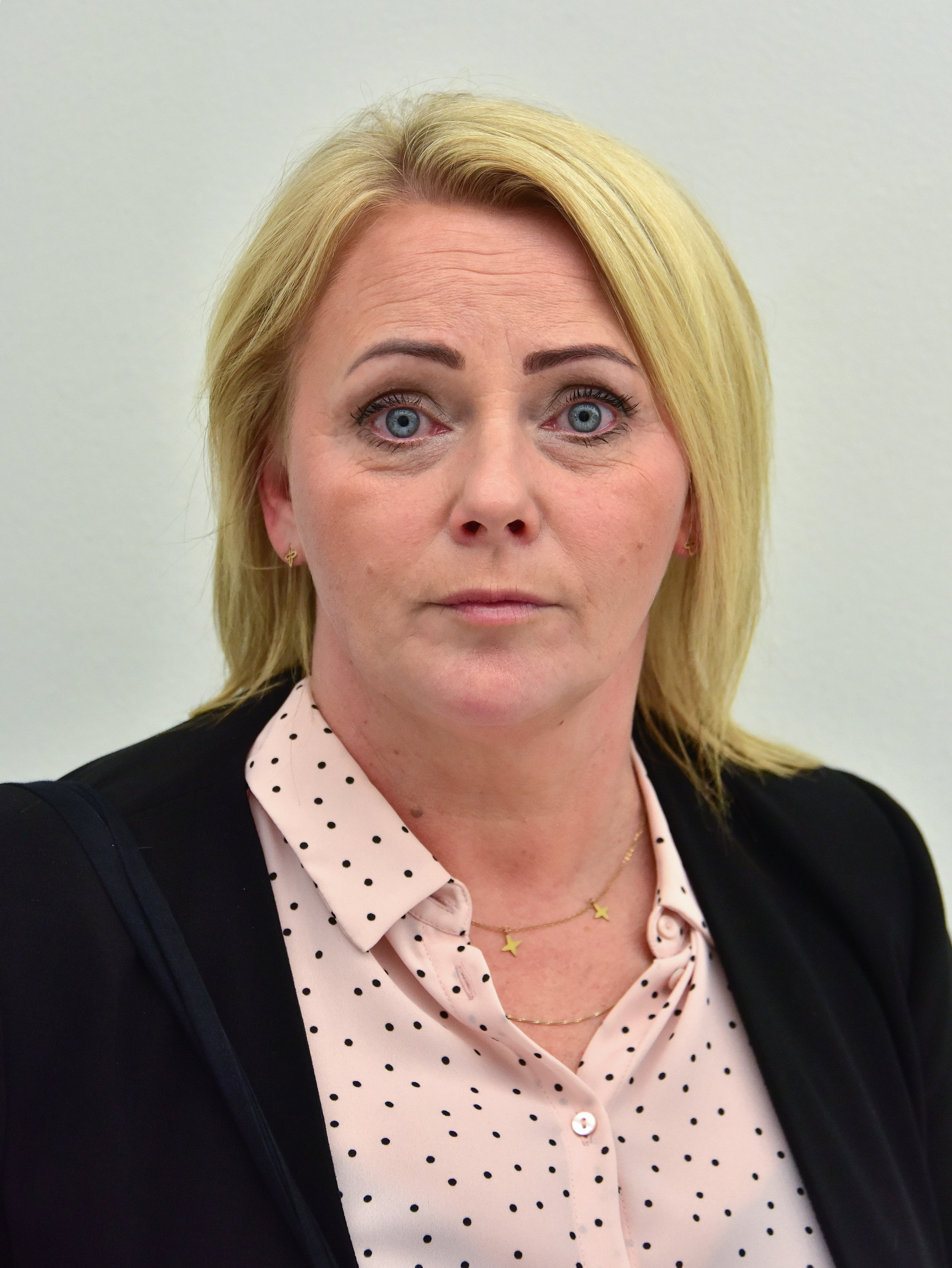

Member of the Sejm
- Incumbent
- Assumed office 12 November 2019
- Constituency: 5 Toruń

Personal details
- Born: Iwona Zielińska; 6 September 1970 (age 55) Rypin, Polish People's Republic
- Citizenship: Poland
- Party: Civic Coalition

Iwona Hartwich (née Zielińska; born 6 September 1970) is a Polish disability rights activist and politician. A key organiser of the 2014 and 2018 Polish disability protests, Hartwich was elected to the Sejm in 2019, representing constituency no. 5 in Toruń.

== Personal life ==
Hartwich is from Toruń. After training as a salesperson at the School of Economics in Toruń, she married and had two children. Her eldest son Jakub (born 1994) has cerebral palsy and uses a wheelchair. Following his birth, Hartwich was unable to return to work and cared for Jakub. Jakub has taken part in protests with his mother.

== Disability rights activism ==
In 2008, Hartwich started posting on the online forum Razem Możemy Więcej (English: "together we can do more"), in which parents and carers of disabled children could seek support. Many posts were around the low amount of złoty paid to support carers; Hartwich herself was unable to receive the benefit due to her earning 50 zł (£9) over the maximum threshold. With other members of the forum, in 2009 Hartwich organised a protest outside the Warsaw offices of the then-Prime Minister, Donald Tusk, with the slogan "samą miłością dzieci nie nakarmimy" ("we can't feed our children with love"). Tusk subsequently raised the carer payments by 100 zł and abolished the income criteria.

Hartwich subsequently founded Mam Przyszłość ("I have a future"), an organisation aimed at supporting disabled people and their carers, in response to her belief that the Polish government was not taking carers' concerns seriously. In 2011, she led protests outside the offices of Tusk and Bartosz Arłukowicz, the Minister of Health. She subsequently met with Jacek Kwiatkowski and Ewa Kopacz, and subsequently a law was passed increasing carer payments to 820 zł.

In March and April 2014, Hartwich led 17 days of continual sit-in protests of the Sejm, during which time she called for an increase in state payments made to carers; she stated she was inspired to do so after Tusk went back on promises he had made about maintaining the level of payments in line with inflation. She declined Tusk's initial offer of raising carer payments to match minimum wage over a period of several years; the protest ended when the government agreed to make the match immediately.

In April and May 2018, Hartwich led 40 days of sit-in protests, calling on the social pension to be raised; this was ultimately implemented by the government, alongside the introduction of an allowance for adults with disabilities unable to live independently. Following this protest, Hartwich was issued with a ban from entering the Sejm until 2020.

== Political career ==
In 2019, Hartwich was selected as a list candidate for the Civic Coalition for constituency no. 5 in Toruń. After being placed seventh in the list, Hartwich threatened to withdraw her candidacy; following talks with Grzegorz Schetyna, she was placed third on the list. She was ultimately elected to the Sejm in the 2019 parliamentary election, receiving 10,865 votes.
