= Lives Worth Living =

- Directed by: Eric Neudel
- Produced by: Alison Gilkey
- Cinematography: Eric Neudel
- Edited by: Bernice Schneider
- Music by: John Kusiak & P. Andrew Willis
- Distributed by: Storyline Motion Pictures & Independent Television Service (ITVS)
- Release date: October 27, 2011 (Independent Lens)
- Country: United States
- Language: English

Lives Worth Living is a 2011 documentary film directed by Eric Neudel and produced by Alison Gilkey, and broadcast by PBS through ITVS, as part of the Independent Lens series. The film is the first television chronicle of the history of the American disability rights movement from the post-World War II era until the passage of the Americans with Disabilities Act (ADA) in 1990.

== Background ==
The disability rights movement is a civil and human rights movement wherein people with disabilities fight against discrimination and demand equal access and equal opportunity to everything society has to offer, including employment, housing, transportation, telecommunications and state and local government services.

== Synopsis ==
The documentary intersperses archival footage with first-person interviews with disability rights activists who fought discrimination such as Fred Fay, I. King Jordan, Judi Chamberlin and Judith Heumann, and with legislators who helped draft and secure the passage of the ADA, including Tony Coelho and Tom Harkin. From the beginnings of the disability rights movement, when veterans with disabilities returning home from World War II began to demand an end to discrimination and for better access to employment and other social opportunities, Lives Worth Living traces the history of the movement in the United States in roughly chronological order. The film documents how, in the late 1960s and early 1970s, activists with disabilities began to adopt some of the tactics and strategies used by civil rights activists a decade earlier, including marches, protests, and civil disobedience.

Using sometimes-disturbing archival footage, Lives Worth Living describes efforts spearheaded by activists and politicians like Bobby Kennedy to shine a public spotlight on the often-horrendous conditions in state institutions for people with mental disabilities, such as Willowbrook State School in Staten Island, New York, eventually leading to deinstitutionalization and community-based alternative programs. Lives Worth Living also documents how, in 1988, Deaf students at Gallaudet University in Washington D.C. protested the appointment of yet another in a long line of hearing presidents, and demanded that a deaf president be appointed instead. People with disabilities formed cross-disability coalitions to demand access to all the things that nondisabled people take for granted, including public transportation, accessible housing, public accommodations, and jobs. All these efforts culminated in the passage of the Americans with Disabilities Act by Congress, and the ADA's signing by President George H. W. Bush on July 26, 1990.
