= International Ventilator Users Network =

US-based organization

The International Ventilator Users Network (IVUN) is a nonprofit network of mechanical ventilation users, respiratory health professionals, and ventilatory equipment manufacturers. Its focus is on the health and independent living of ventilator users, whether they are using assisted ventilation long-term—at home or in nursing facilities—or short-term in emergency rooms and critical care units.

Many ventilator users have neuromuscular conditions, such as respiratory polio or post-polio syndrome, amyotrophic lateral sclerosis (ALS), muscular dystrophy, spinal muscular atrophy (SMA), spinal cord injury (SCI), or congenital central hypoventilation syndrome (CCHS). Historically, IVUN's efforts have been primarily addressed to ventilator users with neuromuscular conditions. But people who have chronic obstructive pulmonary disease (COPD) or obesity hypoventilation syndrome may also need to use assisted ventilation.

== Mission ==
IVUN's mission is "to enhance the lives and independence" of ventilator users "through education, advocacy, research, and networking" among ventilator uses, respiratory health professionals, and ventilatory equipment manufacturers. Support comes from individual members, donors, and sponsors.

IVUN's parent organization is Post-Polio Health International (PHI). It shares that organization's headquarters and staff in St. Louis, Missouri, as well as its volunteer Board of Directors. IVUN's publications, website, and volunteer advisory boards are its own, however.

== Current activities ==
=== Education ===
IVUN publishes (both online and in print) authoritative medical information based on interaction between ventilator users and healthcare professionals. Currently, users can find online free of charge a 16-page introductory document describing the history of ventilators, the various types of ventilators, and the types of user-interfaces; a packet of documents dealing with emergency medical care for home ventilator users (checklists for users, caregivers, physicians, and emergency medical services personnel); and a comprehensive Home Ventilator Guide which provides technical information on home/portable ventilator equipment from manufacturers worldwide. Past issues of IVUN's quarterly newsletter, Ventilator-Assisted Living, are also online. IVUN's staff maintain a telephone answer-line and answer e-mail inquiries during business hours.

=== Networking ===
IVUN publishes, and makes available free online, the Resource Directory for Ventilator-Assisted Living, which lists respiratory health professionals who are experts in long-term assisted ventilation, ventilatory equipment manufacturers and their contact information, and organizations whose members use assisted ventilation. IVUN's website manages an equipment exchange, a peer-to-peer advice page, and ventilator news digests.

IVUN staff regularly attend medical meetings and international conferences on home ventilator use, and coordinate presentations by ventilator users at medical meetings such as those for the American College of Chest Physicians (ACCP). In addition, IVUN/PHI's periodic international conferences present many sessions relevant to ventilator users.

=== Advocacy and Research ===
With respect to advocacy and research, IVUN's activities are integrated with those of PHI. A recent research grant of direct relevance to ventilator users is a study, conducted in 2005 by a team at Johns Hopkins University, on the "Timing of Noninvasive Ventilation for Patients with Amyotrophic Lateral Sclerosis." An earlier research award (2001) went to researchers at the University of Toronto, Canada for a study on "Ventilator Users' Perspectives on the Important Elements of Health-Related Quality of Life."

== History ==
IVUN was formally established under that name in 1987, but its roots go back to the polio epidemics of the 1940s and 1950s, when the possibility of long-term survival with mechanically assisted ventilation became a reality. Beginning in 1949, IVUN's founder, Gini Laurie, was an American Red Cross volunteer in the polio wards of Cleveland's City Hospital, and later in the part of that hospital (Toomey Pavilion) that became one of the 15 respiratory care and rehabilitation hospitals funded by the March of Dimes. Those centers all across the country began to close after the polio epidemics in the United States ended. Laurie, however, was determined to keep the respiratory polio survivors in touch with each other, and with their medical specialists.

She did this first by taking over the editorship of Toomey Pavilion's alumni newsletter, the Toomeyville Jr. Gazette, and circulating it widely throughout the United States. Copies also went to individuals and organizations in Canada, Great Britain, Europe, and Australia. In 1960, her informal organization of volunteers was incorporated under the name Iron Lung Polio Assistance, and her newsletter grew into a magazine called the Toomey j. Gazette. In 1964, the organization changed its name to Iron Lung Polios and Multiplegics, to reflect more accurately Laurie's cross-disability concerns. The magazine became the Rehabilitation Gazette in 1970, carrying a wide range of articles on independent living for people with physical disabilities. Laurie soon became one of the central figures in the development of the independent living movement and in the founding of the Centers for Independent Living in the United States.

Laurie's central concerns, however, always included ventilator users. Specifically, they concerned finding ways for ventilator users to leave hospitals and nursing homes with the support necessary for them to live active, effective lives as members of their communities. As some cross-disability organizations such as the American Coalition of Citizens with Disabilities (ACCD) dissolved into disability-specific organizations, IVUN was formed to make sure there were publications and networks specifically for long-term ventilator users.

== See also ==
- Mechanical ventilation
- Medical ventilator
