= Gini Laurie =

American disability activist (1913–1989)

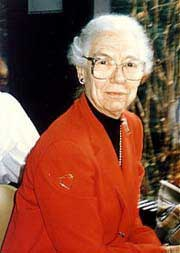
Gini Laurie, circa 1985. PHI archives.

Virginia Grace Wilson "Gini" Laurie (June 10, 1913 – June 28, 1989) was a central figure in the 20th century development, in the United States, of the independent living movement for people with disabilities. It is sometimes said that she was one of its two "grandmothers"—the other one being Mary Switzer, who was in charge of vocational rehabilitation at the national level from 1950 to 1970.

Gini Laurie did her work entirely as a volunteer. From modest beginnings in the 1950s, she founded the organizations now known as Post-Polio Health International and the International Ventilator Users Network – organizations that remain vigorous continuations of her legacy. Through them she developed international networks of polio survivors and other people with physical disabilities, healthcare professionals in the field of rehabilitation, policymakers, and disability rights activists. She edited and published a newsletter that soon grew into an influential magazine called the Rehabilitation Gazette: International Journal of Independent Living by and for Persons with a Disability. During the 1980s, she organized international conferences to deal with the emerging crisis with post-polio syndrome. In 1984, she co-edited and published the first edition of the Handbook on the Late Effects of Poliomyelitis for Physicians and Survivors.

Laurie was an advocate for cross-disability causes as well as those related to polio, and as early as 1963 was publishing articles on what came to be called the independent living philosophy – though as she often reminded people, the phrase "interdependent living" was a more accurate description of the situation for human lives generally, disabled or not.

In St. Louis, Missouri, in 1970, she helped Max Starkloff found Paraquad, an organization devoted to helping disabled residents move from nursing homes and other institutions into neighborhood homes, and which became part of the first small group of Centers for Independent Living in the US. There are now over 600. In 1974, she and her magazine supported the founding of the American Coalition of Citizens with Disabilities (ACCD), a disability rights organization created, administered and led by people with disabilities. She was the only non-disabled member of its board of directors.

In 1977, the same year that the ACCD successfully pressured the government to release final regulations implementing Section 504 of the 1973 Rehabilitation Act, Laurie wrote Housing and Home Services for the Disabled: Guidelines and Experiences in Independent Living.

For three decades, she campaigned against the institutionalization of people with disabilities, and for the rehabilitation and personal assistance services that would make an empowered life possible for them in their communities. "[M]orally, institutionalizing young people with so much potential for service is wrong", she said in 1963. And in 1977, "Of first importance is the right to freedom of choice to live as normal a life as possible within the community… Segregation is unnormal."

Her work was honored at the national level with the President's Distinguished Service Award in 1979 and the Marion Mill Preminger Award of the People-to-People Program; at the state level, in Missouri, with the Jefferson Award; locally in St. Louis with the St. Louis Globe-Democrat 1979 Woman of Achievement award and the prestigious St Louis Award in 1986; by her alma mater Randolph-Macon Woman's College in 1981, with the first in its continuing series of Alumnae Achievement Awards; and posthumously by a permanent exhibit in the Missouri History Museum.

== Life, and life's work ==
Gini Laurie was born Virginia Grace Wilson, in St. Louis, Missouri, in 1913. The year before her birth, there was a nationwide polio epidemic, and its effect on her family explains a good deal about her later commitment to helping polio survivors. She put it this way at the 1988 dedication of the new St. John's Rehabilitation Hospital in St. Louis:

My father was a surgeon and on staff at the old Euclid Avenue St. John's [Hospital]. In 1912, the year before I was born, four siblings were struck by polio: a 12-year-old sister was mildly disabled, a 6-year-old brother very severely disabled, and two sisters, aged 3 and 9, died within days at St. John's. In their memory, my mother painted a mural on the ceiling of the St. John's chapel depicting them as angels. Sixteen years later, I watched my significantly disabled brother die of pneumonia and underventilation at St. John's. His funeral mass was in St. John's Chapel, underneath the mural of our sisters.

She was named for the two sisters who died in that epidemic – Virginia, and Grace. She was, as she sometimes put it, "a replacement child." Her connections to disabling diseases, and in particular polio, went deep.

In 1934, she received a B.A. degree in Latin and Greek (with Phi Beta Kappa honors) from Randolph-Macon Woman's College (now Randolph College) in Lynchburg, Virginia. She had gone to college with the intention of becoming a physician, but eventually abandoned that plan due to the obstacles women then faced in entering the profession. At the age of 25, in 1938, she married Joseph Scott Laurie III, and they resided in St. Louis. She took a secretarial course, worked as a decorator at The Warfield Shop, and volunteered as an American Red Cross Gray Lady.

Joe Laurie served in the army, and the couple traveled frequently during the war years. Late in the 1940s, his job as a chemist and salesman for a brewing company took them to Cleveland, Ohio. During the polio epidemic of 1949, Gini Laurie began to work around the edges of polio rehabilitation as an American Red Cross volunteer at the Toomey Pavilion at Cleveland's City Hospital, later the twelfth of 15 Respiratory Care and Rehabilitation Centers funded by the National Foundation for Infantile Paralysis (March of Dimes).

In the late 1940s and early 1950s, severely compromised polio survivors, especially those with respiratory difficulties, were often hospitalized for many months, or even years. Staff at such institutions relied heavily on volunteers to assist with patient services – reading, writing letters, and assisting therapists. Patients often developed close bonds with each other, and with the staff and volunteers. Those bonds were an important feature of their rehabilitation, but were often broken when patients were finally discharged. One of the things Laurie did as a volunteer at the Toomey Pavilion Center was to help publish its newsletter to alumni – a newsletter that was circulated widely to patients at the 14 other respiratory rehabilitation centers in the US.

What followed is described by Joan L. Headley, executive director of Post-Polio Health International:

The [respiratory rehabilitation] centers, where individuals with severe polio in need of rocking beds and iron lungs were sent, provided superb medical and psychological rehabilitation but, until 1953, most of the permanent respirator users seemed doomed to remain in the hospital for the rest of their lives. In order to save money by avoiding lifelong hospitalization at the high daily rate of $37, Rancho Los Amigos Respiratory Center for Poliomyelitis in Downey, California, pioneered a system of home care that cost only $10 per day, and polio survivors were sent home with their iron lungs and chest cuirasses.

Meanwhile, Gini Laurie [continued to volunteer at Toomey Pavilion] and kept up with her old polio pals who had gone home. Reflecting in her later years, Gini commented that it was "apparent they [polio survivors] had two vital needs … people and information. They wanted to keep [up] with each other … and wanted to share information about their lives and equipment."

Gini and her husband, Joe, started to meet those needs by building a heated pool with a lift at their home, where they held annual reunions of the alumni of the respiratory center. In 1958, the same year, they started publishing Toomeyville Jr. Gazette, featuring news of how polio survivors managed at home.

By 1959, the vaccines had stopped polio, the public stopped giving to the March of Dimes, and the March of Dimes stopped paying for attendants and closed the respiratory centers. The sudden loss of attendant payments caused panic. There was no Social Security Disability Insurance, no Medicare, no Medicaid, no vocational rehabilitation for people with severe disabilities. There was only welfare or help from churches or family. Fortunately, polio survivors who had gone home from the centers had worked with attendants for a few years, and had worked out some systems of community support. However, they also needed the psychological support of other survivors. …

Gini led a letter-writing campaign in 1959, alerting survivors in every state to write to their congressmen urging national attendant care legislation. The national campaign was unsuccessful, but it called Washington's attention to the problems of people with severe disabilities. However, the California campaign was successful due to the efforts of the respiratory polio survivors, and state legislation established attendant care (in her words) 'that later cleared the path for the independent living movement – for attendant care is the linchpin of independence.' The 1959 campaign for national attendant care demonstrated and solidified Gini's belief in networking – the power of connecting people with people and the power of information.

[Gini wrote that] "Networking links people who share common needs or common goals. Networking is a support system. It is a method of self-organizing. It is the structure of a social movement. Most of all, it is a method by which people get things done.

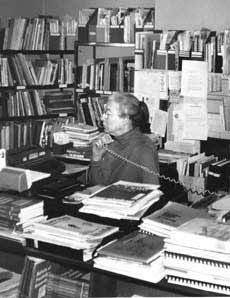
Gini in her office, circa 1982. PHI archives.

Laurie was determined to keep polio survivors in touch with one another, and with their medical specialists, as a way of assisting them as they went about building lives for themselves. In 1959, she formed a nonprofit organization called Iron Lung Polio Assistance, Inc. and began to publish the immediate precursor to the Rehabilitation Gazette in the form of "a leisurely quarterly" called the Toomey j. Gazette – a rather opaque name for general purposes, but one that was instantly recognizable to respiratory polios throughout the United States. And it went to all of them she could find, in North America, the British Commonwealth, Europe, South America and elsewhere. "Our aim," wrote Laurie in 1960, is "to reach and advance respiratory polios all over the world and to share the problems, experiences, thoughts and adventures that would be of value." She wrote parts of the magazine, but preferred to publish articles in the words of polio survivors themselves. She and her husband Joe edited it, but always in collaboration with people who were themselves living with significant physical disabilities.

At first the Gazette seemed concerned primarily with sustaining the bonds polio survivors had already formed with each other, and in helping them to record and communicate to each other important techniques, and steps in their continuing rehabilitation. But its mission quickly broadened and deepened. Access to higher education was an early concern, and Laurie invited articles on the subject from seriously disabled people whom she knew had successfully negotiated access and were well on the way to completing their educations. Attendant care was another persistent concern, as was transportation, employment, and travel. There were architectural barriers to be coped with. There was discrimination in employment. The best hope for getting the public attention and social resources necessary to support independent living for disabled people seemed to depend crucially on demonstrating the ways in which that could be successful.

There was no reason to limit these demonstrations to the lives of respiratory polio survivors, or polio survivors generally, even if one were committed centrally to serving their needs. In 1964 Laurie changed the name of her nonprofit organization to Iron Lung Polios and Multiplegics, Inc. In the following years there would be further name changes, often with less regard to transparency for the general public than to signaling (to the disability community at large) her organization's sensitivity to the constantly evolving social, medical, and political landscape. In 1970, Iron Lung Polios and Multiplegics became Rehabilitation Gazette, Inc. to signal Laurie's focus on producing a more substantial magazine of the same name – one that would be relevant across many disabilities. In 1971, Gini and Joe Laurie left Cleveland and returned to St. Louis. In 1983, in the year she organized an international conference on post-polio matters and living independently with a severe disability, she wanted to emphasize the international dimension of her work, and the name Gazette International Networking Institute was concocted to communicate that. Its only redeeming feature, at least to many of Gini Laurie's loyal admirers, was that it formed the acronym G.I.N.I., which allowed them at last to refer to her and her organization with the same name.

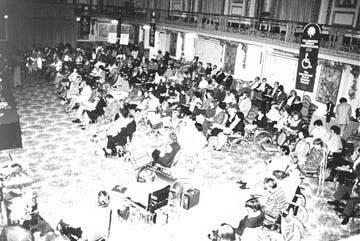
First Post-Polio Conference, 1981 Chicago. PHI archives.

In 1979, Laurie had begun to receive disturbing inquiries and reports from polio survivors about new problems – increased fatigue, muscle weakness, pain, and decreasing mobility. The Gazette published some of this, and with her usual proactive approach, once she determined that these reports reflected growing concerns among both polio survivors and medical professionals about a constellation of symptoms referred to as post-polio syndrome, she launched a memorable series of national and international conferences on post-polio, independent living, and aging with a disability. The first of these was in 1981; the fifth was in 1989, the year she died. The tenth will be held in 2009.

The mid-1980s were a time of transition, both for Gini Laurie and for her organization. She and her husband were themselves aging, and it was clear that the organization, if it was to continue, needed to have a professional staff. In 1984, Judith Raymond was hired as executive director, and took over much of the work on the conferences and publications. In 1987, Raymond married D. Armin Fischer, MD, Chief of the Chest Medicine Service at Rancho Los Amigos Hospital in Downey, California.

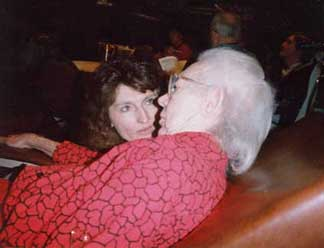
1989 conference. Joan Headley conferring with Gini Laurie. PHI archives.

Laurie then hired Joan L. Headley as executive director. Judith Raymond Fischer remained the volunteer editor of Ventilator-Assisted Living, the organization's publication for ventilator users, and is still a consultant. Joan Headley continues to serve as the executive director.

Gini Laurie's husband, Joseph Laurie, died in 1985. Gini herself died of cancer in late June 1989, just three and one-half weeks after the fifth international post-polio conference, held in St. Louis from May 31 through June 4. She went to conference events on a stretcher, with the help of attendants.
