= South Ockendon Hospital =

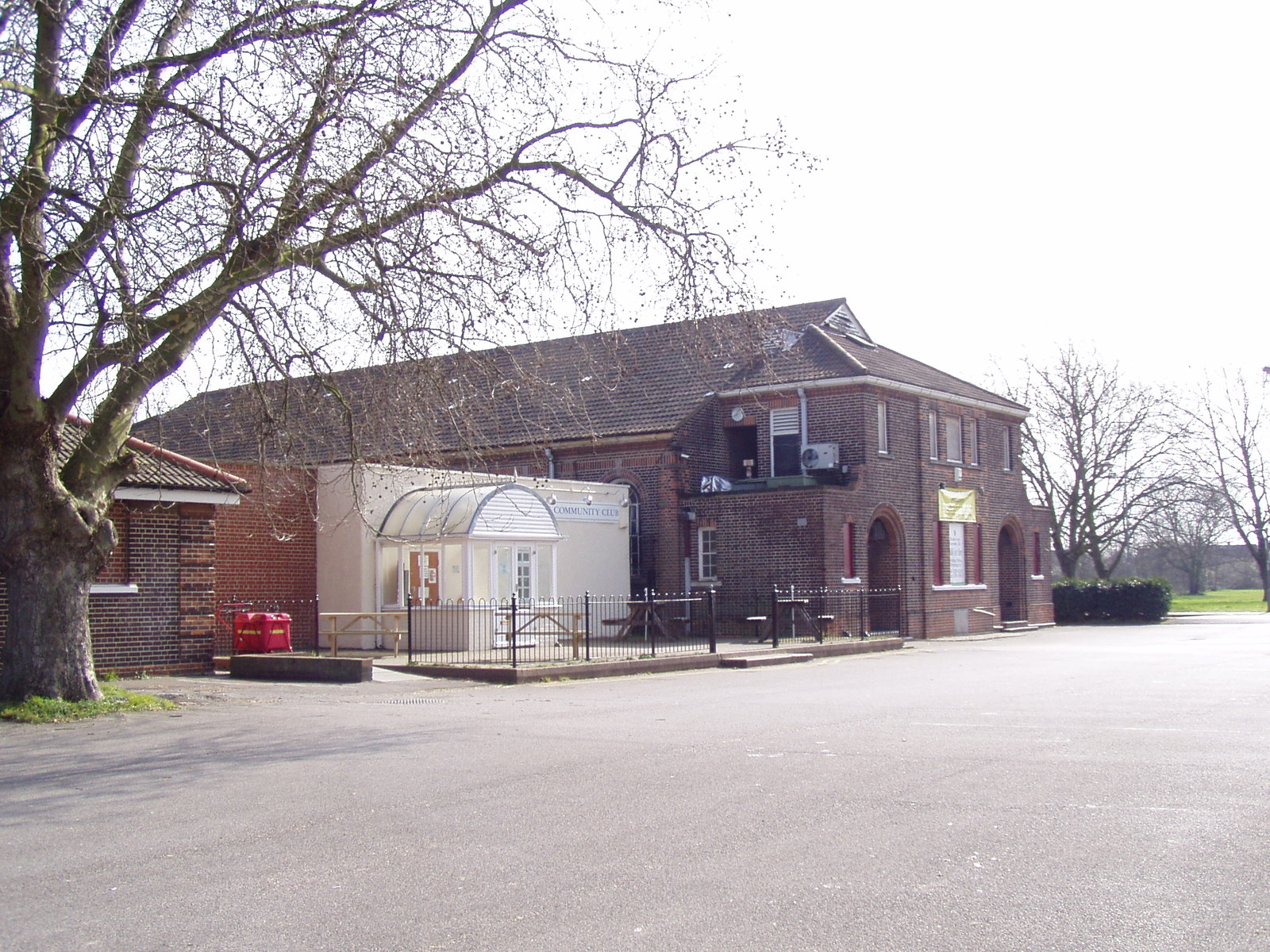
- One of the few remaining hospital buildings (now used as a community club)

- Shown in Essex

Geography
- Location: South Ockendon, Essex, England, United Kingdom
- Coordinates: 51.5182°N 0.3013°E

Organisation
- Care system: Public NHS
- Type: Mental health

History
- Founded: 1932
- Closed: 1994

Links
- Lists: Hospitals in England

South Ockendon Hospital (known locally as The Colony) was a hospital for patients with severe learning difficulties and for patients with major and rare mental health illnesses in South Ockendon, Essex, England.

== History ==
The site acquired for the hospital, which once formed part of the South Ockendon Hall estate, was known as Little Mollands Farm. It opened as the South Ockendon Colony, a facility for "mental defectives", in 1932. It joined the National Health Service in 1948 when it was renamed the South Ockendon Hospital. The foundation stone for the Gloucester Clinic, a new clinical facility, was laid by the Duchess of Gloucester in 1955.

In 1974 an employee at the hospital anonymously sent Barbara Robb, a campaigner for the well-being of elderly people, pages torn from a ward report book, describing severe injuries probably inflicted by staff on a patient. Robb's personal involvement and persistence was recognized by Barbara Castle, Secretary of State for Health and Social Services.

After the introduction of Care in the Community in the early 1980s the hospital went into a period of decline and closed in 1994. Most of the buildings were demolished, except for a building which was subsequently converted for use as a community club, and redevelopment of the site, now known as the Brandon Groves Estate, was completed in 2000.
