= Frank Bowe =

American professor and disability rights activist

Frank G. Bowe
- Born: March 29, 1947; United States
- Died: August 21, 2007 (aged 60)
- Education: McDaniel College
- Occupations: Academic, disability rights activist, author
- Employer: Hofstra University

Frank G. Bowe (March 29, 1947 – August 21, 2007) was a deaf American disability studies academic, activist, author, and the Dr. Mervin Livingston Schloss Distinguished Professor for the Study of Disabilities at Hofstra University. As a disability rights activist, author, and teacher, he accomplished a series of firsts for individuals with disabilities.

== Early life and education ==
Bowe held a M.A. from Gallaudet University and a B.A. (summa cum laude) from McDaniel College. His Ph.D. in educational psychology (research) was earned at New York University. NYU awarded him its Distinguished Alumni Award. Gallaudet awarded him an Honorary Doctor of Laws (LL.D), and McDaniel College has recognized him with two alumni achievement awards.

== Career ==
=== "Father of Section 504" ===
Bowe was the first executive director (CEO) of the first national cross-disability consumer advocacy organization, the American Coalition of Citizens with Disabilities (ACCD). The Coalition's signature achievement was securing the long-delayed implementation of Section 504, the world's first civil-rights provision for persons with disabilities. Bowe conceived and led the nationwide protest that led to issuance of landmark regulations for Section 504 in 1977. He later wrote Handicapping America, the first full-length text on social policy and disability, which was published by Harper & Row.

In 1980, Bowe was the first person with a disability to represent any nation in the planning of the United Nations (UN) International Year of Disabled Persons (IYDP-1981). Today, many countries are represented in key UN committees by persons who themselves are individuals with disabilities, including 14 who are, as Bowe was, deaf.

In the mid-1980s, he chaired the U.S. Congress Commission on Education of the Deaf (COED), which made 52 recommendations for improving education and rehabilitation. COED issued a public draft of its final report in January, 1988. The example he and COED set was not lost on the students at Gallaudet University across town when, in March, 1988, they launched the Deaf President Now protest.

Section 504 led, in 1990, to the Americans with Disabilities Act. That same year, Bowe was the principal architect of the Television Decoder Circuitry Act, which was sponsored in the Senate by Tom Harkin and in the House by Edward Markey. The act requires that TV sets receive and display closed captions. The 1996 Telecommunications Act took it a step further, mandating that broadcast and cable programs themselves be captioned. In 2005 and 2006, Bowe gave invited testimony before the U.S. House of Representatives Committee on Energy and Commerce and conducted demonstrations of high-speed broadband communications for both the House and the U.S. Senate.

Bowe's textbooks are in use at colleges and universities around the country and in several other nations. Making Inclusion Work (Prentice Hall) and Early Childhood Special Education (Thomson Delmar Learning) are two examples. He was also author of Universal Design in Education (published by Greenwood Publishing), of the encyclopedia entries on deafness and disabilities in Scholastic's New Book of Knowledge, and of several hundred articles in professional journals in public policy, special education, rehabilitation, and technology.

In Disability in America 2006, a policy paper addressing health care, employment, and entitlements, Bowe outlined disability policy goals for 2006-2008.

=== Hofstra University ===
As a professor at Hofstra University on Long Island, Bowe helped to prepare more than 2,000 special-education teachers. He was given the Distinguished Teaching (University Teacher of the Year) Award in 1996. For five years, he was program director for special education. He also chaired several committees at Hofstra and served on doctoral dissertation committees at NYU and other universities.

In 2006, he spearheaded a campus-wide project to make information and instruction more accessible to and usable by students, faculty, staff and alumni at Hofstra. The professor served on the editorial board of five professional journals and as governmental affairs consultant for the National Association of the Deaf (United States).

== Selected quotes ==
- "America handicaps disabled people. And because that is true, we are handicapping America itself". (Handicapping America, 1978, p. vii)
- "The present status of education for persons who are deaf in the United States is unsatisfactory. Unacceptably so. This is the primary and inescapable conclusion of the Commission on Education of the Deaf." (Toward Equality: Education of the Deaf, 1988, p. viii)
- "SSDI and SSI ... the rapid escalation of costs and the narrowing of employer [health insurance] coverage ... and other factors ... keep the American Dream out of reach for many Americans with disabilities." ("Disability in America," 2006)
- "...[t]ake some of the money now spent on entitlements and turn it, instead, toward postsecondary education and vocational training for Americans with disabilities. ... take some (much less!) of it and put it toward real enforcement of ADA title I by the EEOC. And ... take some (more) of it and partially subsidize employer-provided health insurance, as an incentive for hiring adults with disabilities." ("Disability in America", 2006)

== Awards ==
Bowe is named in numerous Who's Who publications, including Who's Who in the World, Who's Who in Education, and others. In 1994, Bowe was inducted into the National Hall of Fame for Persons with Disabilities. In 1992, he received the Distinguished Service Award of the President of the United States, signed by President George H. W. Bush.
