= Barbara Robb =

English campaigner for the elderly (1912–1976)

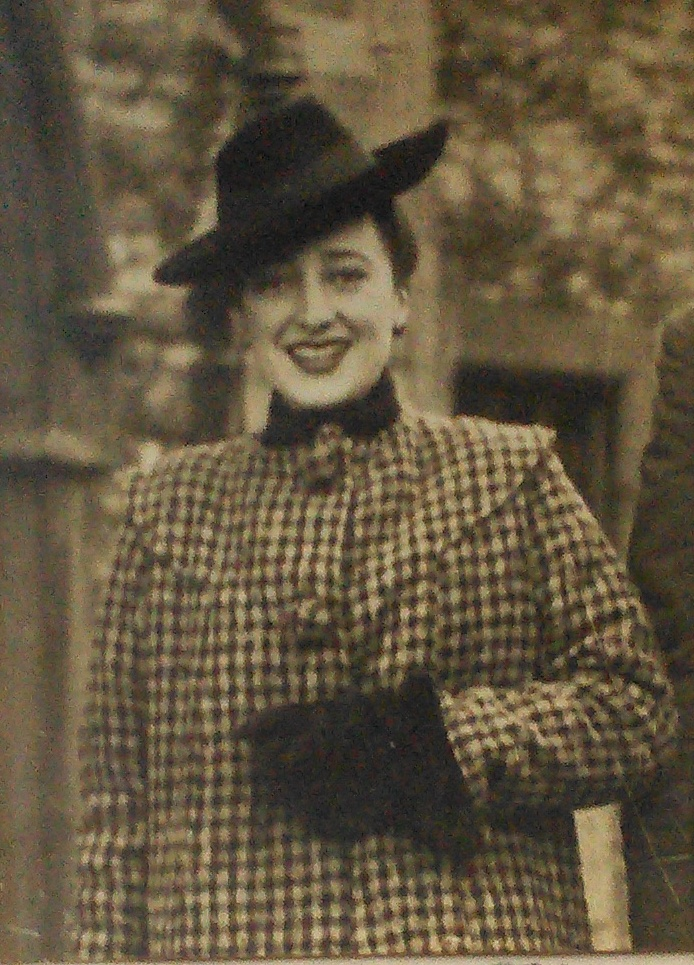
- Robb c. 1941
- Born: Barbara Anne; 15 April 1912; Yorkshire, England
- Died: 21 June 1976 (aged 64); London, England
- Education: Chelsea School of Art
- Occupations: Psychotherapist and campaigner
- Known for: Founder of AEGIS
- Spouse: Brian Robb

Barbara Robb (née Anne, 15 April 1912 – 21 June 1976) was a British campaigner for the well-being of older people, best known for founding and leading the pressure group AEGIS (Aid for the Elderly in Government Institutions) and for the book Sans Everything: A Case to Answer.

A professional psychotherapist, Robb founded AEGIS after witnessing inadequate and inhumane treatment of one of her former patients, and other elderly women, during a visit to Friern Hospital. AEGIS campaigned to improve the care of older people in long-stay wards of National Health Service (NHS) psychiatric hospitals. In 1967, Robb compiled Sans Everything: A Case to Answer, a controversial book, detailing the inadequacies of care provided for older people, which prompted a nationwide scandal. Although initially official inquiries into these allegations reported that they were "totally unfounded or grossly exaggerated", her campaigns led to revealing other instances of ill-treatment, which were accepted and prompted the government to implement NHS policy changes.

== Early life ==
Born into a landed Roman Catholic recusant family in Yorkshire, Barbara Anne had a privileged early life, a convent education, and attended finishing school in Kensington, London. She danced with the Vic-Wells company, the forerunner of the Royal Ballet, but an ankle injury ended her dancing career. Instead, she studied theatre and stage design at the Chelsea School of Art. At Chelsea, she met Brian Robb, an artist, cartoonist and illustrator. They married in 1937.

Robb's grandfather, Major Ernest Charlton Anne (1852–1939) inspired her humanitarian outlook. Robb recalled his words many years later: "when you see somebody needing help – help him" and "wherever there were nettles there were sure to be dock leaves to cure the sting [...] Remember that everything in life is like the nettles, there are always dock leaves if only you look hard enough."

Amy Anne, Robb's mother, died of cancer in 1935, and her brother, Robert Anne, was killed on active service in the Second World War in 1941.

== Middle years (1940s–1965) ==
During the 1940s, Robb trained in Jungian psychotherapy with some guidance from a psychoanalyst and Dominican priest Father Victor White. Robb undertook a "remarkable self-analysis", and mainly taught herself the techniques of the discipline. White corresponded and collaborated with Carl Jung. Letters between them refer to Robb's dreams and their interpretation, her personality and appearance; Jung wrote, "She decidedly leaves you guessing", and that she was "an eyeful and beyond!" White called her "quite a corker" and did not quite know how to "deal with" her.

Until 1965, Robb practised as a psychotherapist. She and Brian lived in a small cottage in Hampstead, each of the three floors measuring little more than 2.5-by-3.5 metres. They wanted children, but had none. They had a good social life, including in the company of artists and politicians, often left-wing, and holidayed in Venice, where Brian painted. Robb enjoyed fashionable clothes and hats; C.H. Rolph wrote in his memoir, "Even if it were possible to forget Barbara, it would not be possible to forget those extraordinary, carefully chosen, and obviously expensive hats, with which she seemed to transmute every occasion into a kind of one-woman Ascot."

== Visit to Friern Hospital, 1965 ==
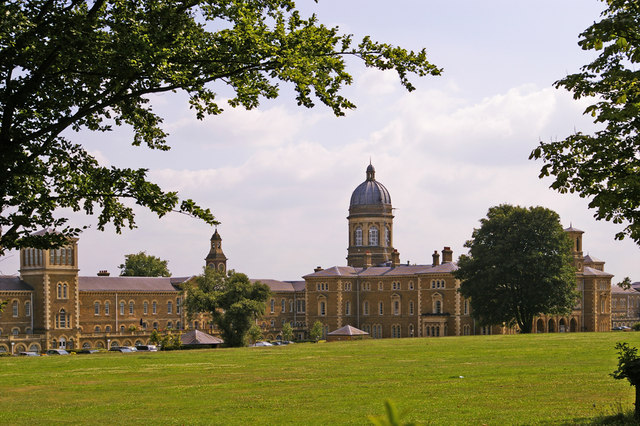
Friern Hospital in 2008 (now renovated as private housing)

White introduced Amy Gibbs (1891–1967) to Robb in 1943, for psychotherapy. Gibbs was well for the next 20 years. She worked as a seamstress, and took up art in retirement. In late 1963, Gibbs was admitted to Friern Hospital, a psychiatric institution. She expected a short admission to sort out her medication, which was making her feel "muzzy".

In December 1964, a mutual friend informed Robb that Gibbs was still in Friern, on a long-stay 'back ward' and wanted to see her. On her first visit in January 1965, Robb was shocked by what she saw and heard on the ward: the patients' uniform haircuts, no activities, institutional clothing, lack of personal possessions including spectacles, dentures and hearing aids, and harshness from the nurses. Robb began "Diary of a Nobody", a diary of her visits to ensure that she accurately recorded them, as "I felt that I would never have another really easy moment unless I did everything I could to try to right this situation."

== AEGIS (1965–c.1975) ==
Within months Robb established AEGIS, which became one of the country's most determined pressure groups. It was small, elite and high profile, using the media to create publicity. Its team of advisors and active supporters included Brian Abel-Smith; CH Rolph; Audrey Harvey; David Kenworthy, 11th Baron Strabolgi; psychiatrists Russell Barton, Anthony Whitehead and David Enoch; nurses with senior roles at the Royal College of Nursing; and others when needed. Strabolgi ensured that a copy of 'Diary of a Nobody' reached the Minister of Health, Kenneth Robinson, who said he would investigate – but nothing happened.

Robb was passionate about her chosen cause, and worked incessantly to achieve improvement in the long-stay wards. Her cottage became AEGIS's headquarters. She described her campaign style as aggressive: "I'm better suited to Walls of Jericho than to Trojan Horse tactics." The Sunday Times described her extraordinary drive and her punishing schedule—twelve hours a day, six days a week—including acting as counsellor to "hundreds of distressed nurses" and responding personally to a constant stream of correspondence. Through her unrelenting determination and her contacts with the press, according to Richard Crossman (the Secretary of State for Health and Social Services 1968–70), Robb achieved the reputation of being "a terrible danger" to the Government, a "bomb" which it "had to defuse."

== Sans Everything ==
=== Sans Everything and its reception (1967) ===
AEGIS published Sans Everything in 1967. Chapters by nurses and social workers, together with Robb's 'Diary of a Nobody', described inhumane and inadequate care in long-stay wards in seven hospitals. Wards were over-crowded and under-staffed. Undignified and unkind practices included rough handling, teasing, slapping, swearing at patients and rushed 'production-line' bathing of over 40 elderly and frail patients in a single morning. There was little, if any, privacy, including for personal care. Bed time could be as early as 5pm. Some wards were locked and unstaffed at night, with senior staff disregarding the risks, for example, of fire. There was lack of medical attention, and usually no attempt at rehabilitation. The practices often evolved from attempts to devise time-saving methods to get through the workload and manage large numbers of patients in overcrowded environments, or were due to ignorance of modern psychiatric and geriatric treatment and care. A stereotypic understanding of inevitable and hopeless chronic decline in old age pervaded and contributed to staff negativity. Staff who complained or wanted to change practices were accused of being disloyal, and could be victimized to the point of resigning or being dismissed from their posts. The book proposed remedies, including specialist psychiatric services to treat, rehabilitate and support mentally unwell older people, based on the model practised at Severalls Hospital in Colchester, which prevented admission and enabled discharge; building homes for rent on surplus land around the psychiatric hospitals to generate income for the NHS to pay for better services and accommodation for older people; and ways of monitoring, to ensure high standards, through improved NHS complaints procedures, a hospital ombudsman and an inspectorate. Discussion at the Ministry did not lead to action.

Throughout AEGIS' campaign, responses from health service staff, politicians, patients and their relatives, the media and the wider public ranged from absolute endorsement of the allegations of bad practice, such as by the press and most relatives of patients, to absolute rejection, most apparent in higher tiers of NHS administration. AEGIS struggled to convince the Ministry of Health and the regional hospital boards (RHBs), which managed the hospitals, about the happenings in them. Robinson publicly criticized the book, and announced on the BBC television news programme 24 Hours that he was sure poor care was almost non-existent and that investigations would demonstrate that. The press criticized Robinson, "who to his shame, seemed to pooh-pooh" the allegations.

=== Inquiries into the allegations ===
These commit the RHBs with responsibility for the hospitals as they adopted various tactics during their investigations, which were out of keeping with government recommendations. These included: discrediting Sans Everything's evidence as false, unreliable or exaggerated, based on their assessment of the witnesses' personality; using leading questions; accepting that practices were correct because that was how they were always done; and justifying their decisions based on comments by senior staff, who they were judging, rather than using independent sources about best psychiatric and geriatric practice. The committees demonstrated their assumptions, about the excellence of nursing care and that the NHS was "the best health service in the world", and they held excessively negative ideas about older people and mental illness. They appeared unaware of the rigid and self-defensive administrative and nursing hierarchies in the psychiatric hospitals, and that complainants could be victimised. The committees lacked professional experience of investigating government appointed boards which had neglected their responsibilities to the detriment of the population they served (such as at Aberfan in 1966). Some committees ignored, or were unaware of, current guidance about NHS complaints management. The Council on Tribunals, the public body set up to ensure fair inquiries, criticized Robinson's handling of the Sans Everything allegations.

The inquiries made 48 general recommendations, but did not uphold the specific allegations. Robinson published the inquiry reports as a white paper and announced in the House of Commons that the allegations were "totally unfounded or grossly exaggerated" and that the committees reported "very favourably on the standard of care provided". An in-depth study of the white paper showed that Robinson's interpretation was incorrect, verging on deceitful. Crossman recorded in his diary that Robinson thought that his dealing with Sans Everything would silence Robb, and that his handling of Sans Everything was "retaliation" against her. This fitted with the observation of Max Beloff, Professor of Government and Public Administration at Oxford, that "most inquiries are so manned that they turn out to be nothing but the system looking at itself, and finding more to admire than to blame."

=== Related scandals ===
Staff in several other psychiatric hospitals made similar allegations. A World in Action television documentary about Powick Hospital, Ward F13, exposed undignified batch-living of 78 elderly women on one Nightingale ward with overworked nurses. There was "smouldering discontent" among the nursing students at Whittingham Hospital, Lancashire, but the senior nurses ignored their concerns. An employee at South Ockendon Hospital, Essex, anonymously sent Robb pages torn from a ward report book, describing severe injuries probably inflicted by staff on a patient. Other disturbing reports emerged, including deaths of patients at Farleigh Hospital, Bristol, and the convictions of three ward staff for manslaughter.

A report about Sans Everything by David Roxan in the News of the World triggered letters of concern about other hospitals. Roxan forwarded them to the Ministry. One concerned Ely Hospital, Cardiff: the Welsh Hospital Board set up a committee of inquiry, chaired by Geoffrey Howe, who had recently represented the National Coal Board managers at the inquiry into the Aberfan disaster. The committee upheld most of the allegations from the whistleblower, nursing auxiliary Michael Pantelides, which were similar to those in Sans Everything. Howe wanted his full report published. Crossman (Robinson had since left the Ministry of Health), fearful of Howe's legal skills and Robb's relationship with the press, agreed. The day Crossman revealed the Ely Inquiry findings in the Commons, he also announced plans to establish an NHS hospitals' inspectorate to help ensure higher standards. The Ely Inquiry, along with those at Farleigh, Whittingham and South Ockendon, vindicated Robb and Sans Everything, although the NHS authorities made no public apology. Sans Everything faded from the agenda, while the other inquiries, especially Ely, achieved highly regarded status.

== Outcomes, death and legacy ==
Robb continued to exert pressure on the government to implement proposals, through the press, Members of Parliament, peers, including Lord Strabolgi, and directly into the DHSS (Department of Health and Social Security) via Abel-Smith. Crossman was keener than Robinson to remedy deficits in the long-stay hospitals. In 1969, Crossman established the Hospital Advisory Service (HAS), an inspectorate. (The Care Quality Commission is the current incarnation.) The HAS linked to proposals in Sans Everything. Crossman, with Howe, Abel-Smith, Robb, Peter Townsend, Bea Serota and some others, made a powerful case for making improvements and allocating more funds to the long-stay hospitals. The DHSS also produced 'blueprints,' in conjunction with NHS clinical staff, for future developments. These contributed to improving services for people with mental illness and 'mental handicap,' and for older people.

Other changes linked to Robb's work took place, some under successive governments. They included: triggering other revelations of ill-treatment, and pressurizing the government to establish inquiries into them; the first review of complaints procedures in the history of the NHS (1971–3); the NHS Ombudsman (1973) and the DHSS' first guidance on preventing violence in hospitals (1976). Other pressure groups followed AEGIS' style and adopted more assertive methods by using the media to shift public opinion and bring pressure to bear on the government. Sans Everything also linked to campaigns to improve nurses' education and conditions of employment and to the development of the new specialty of 'old age psychiatry,' taking a proactive and rehabilitation approach to mental illnesses in older people.

The AEGIS campaign reached a halt, when Robb was diagnosed with cancer in 1974. Robb died at home in Hampstead on 21 June 1976. A memorial stone with her name (and later her husband's) is in the family cemetery at Burghwallis, Yorkshire. Her epitaph reads: "Fearless champion of the cause of old people in hospitals." Robb's legacy was significant: as Abel-Smith said in 1990, "For one woman [...] to suddenly do so much in such a short period – and tragically, to die so soon – is a remarkable story."
