= Stanisław Pięta =

Polish politician (born 1971)

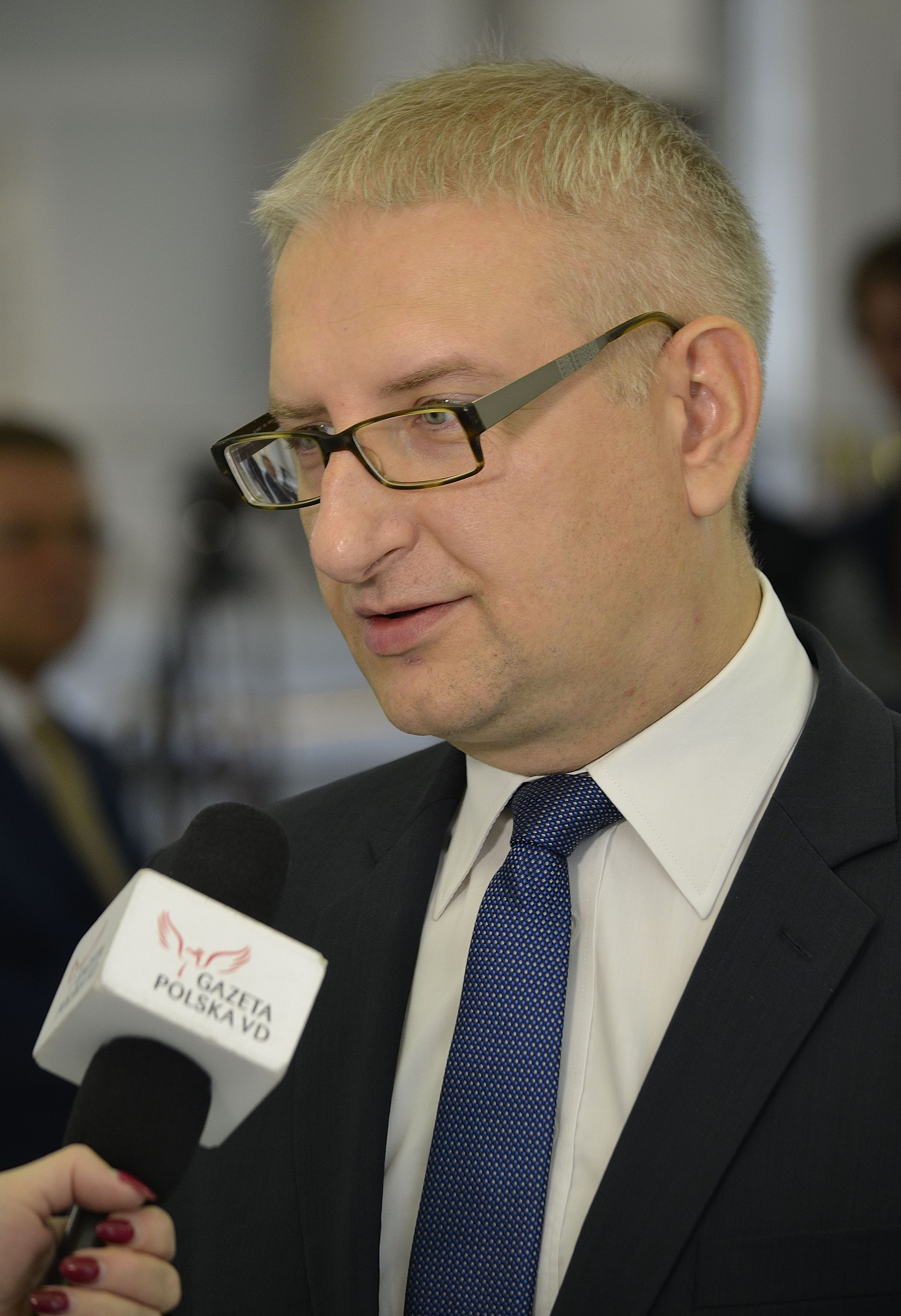

member of Sejm 2005-2007
- In office 25 September 2005 – ?

Personal details
- Born: 1971 (age 54–55)
- Party: Law and Justice

Stanisław Jan Pięta (born 9 May 1971 in Bielsko-Biała) is a Polish politician. He was elected to the Sejm on 25 September 2005, getting 7,240 votes in 27 Bielsko-Biała district as a candidate from the Law and Justice list.

He is married with a child. In 2018, Pięta was accused of seducing a young woman, whom he later abandoned. He was removed from the Sejm group and two commissions.

== See also ==
- Members of Polish Sejm 2005-2007
