= Absence of good =

Theological and philosophical doctrine

Absence of good (Latin: privatio boni), also known as the privation theory of evil, is a theological and philosophical doctrine. It states that evil is not a substance as good is but merely an absence or lack of good. Therefore, everything that exists is good simply because it exists. It could be suggested that evil is either non-substance or complete absence. Evil can be considered to be a parasite on the good it lacks and corrupts.

The privation theory is associated mostly with late antique and medieval Christianity, with particular attention to Augustine of Hippo. Drawing on Neoplatonism, especially Plotinus's views, he stated that evil is a privation of goodness that God created in all things. The theory was later discussed by Boethius, Pseudo-Dionysius, John of Damascus, Thomas Aquinas, and early modern philosophers including Spinoza and Leibniz, in modified forms

Similar concepts appear outside historic Christian thought. For example, authoritative texts of the Baháʼí Faith describe evil as "nonexistence" or "nothingness". In contemporary philosophy of religion, versions of the privation theory have been discussed within neo-Thomist metaphysics.

Because the theory holds that evil is not a positive reality created by God, it is discussed in relation to the problem of evil. According to the theory, if the evil is the absence of good rather that something created by God, then God creates good and permits the absences that constitute evil. Some critics state that the theory has difficulty accounting for evils that appear to have a positive character.

== Theory ==
=== Evil as privation ===
In its classical form, the privation theory states that evil is not any absence, but a privation: the lack of a perfection, form, or order that would be expected in a thing according to its nature. For example, a stone not being able to see is a mere absence. The blindness of an animal that normally can see is a privation. In the same way, sickness is described as the absence of health, and moral vice as the absence of the right order proper to a rational will.

Augustine summarized the view by stating, "what is called evil in the universe is but the absence of good". John of Damascus wrote similarly that "evil is nothing else than absence of goodness, just as darkness also is absence of light". In the Baháʼí tradition, 'Abdu'l-Bahá stated that "good exists; evil is nonexistent", and gave examples such as death as the absence of life, and darkness as the absence of light.

Contemporary neo-Thomist writers continue the privation theory. For example, Obderberg defines evil as the privation of goodness, and describes goodness as a thing fulfilling its nature or proper purpose. He states that evil is a "departure from the goodness prescribed by a thing's essential nature".

=== Being, goodness and value ===
The privation theory is linked to the view that being and goodness are connected. Aquinas stated that "goodness and being are really the same, and different only in idea". For Augustine, whatever exists has being, and to that extent is good. He states that evil is a corruption of this goodness.

Some later thinkers describe a weaker connection between being and goodness while still holding a privation account of evil. Spinoza, for example, treats "good and bad" as ways of comparing finite things. On this view, evil does not have an independent positive status, but refers to the absence of the good.

=== Moral and natural evil ===
In classical philosophy, privation analysis applies to both moral evils (such as vices and injustices) and natural evils (such as illness and bodily defects). According to Augustine, bad characteristics of the soul are privations of natural goodness, in the same way illnesses are privations of bodily wellbeing. Aquinas defines sin as a disorder of the will that lacks proper order, whereas the activities of the will are good in themselves.

The modern supporters differ in their analyses of some specific instances. The first category defines evil as an obstruction of a natural drive toward its proper fulfillment, while others define evil as disordered loves or affections which do not achieve the harmony suitable to rational beings.

== History ==
=== Ancient Greek and Hellenistic philosophy ===
Privationism is occasionally attributed to Plato. He insinuates that evil originates from ignorance, lack of order, or incomplete participation in the Good. The clearest statement of the theory was first made by Plotinus, who was a philosopher in Neoplatonism, in tractate eight of the First Ennead. In his view, evil was "non-being." This concept had a connection with matter because it lacked form. Evil was not seen as an opposing force of the Good and the One. It was rather viewed as "the incidental result of there being a universe at all." The later Neoplatonists and the Christian Platonists used this idea while forming privationism of evil.

=== Ancient and medieval Christian thought ===
Neoplatonism influenced Augustine of Hippo. This can be seen in his privation theory where he states that "all that exist is good" in Confessions VII.12.18. According to him, corruption only destroys something good; if something loses goodness completely, it will not exist anymore, hence evil "is not a substance. If evil were a substance, then it would be good". Several examples of this are found in Enchiridion where he mentions that diseases are manifestations of missing good health, but when health is restored, the malady "ceases to exist altogether".

Augustine's influence would determine how West Christians understood evil. In Book III of The Consolation of Philosophy, Boethius says that "evil is nothing". His argument is based on the fact that God is all-powerful and can do anything but cannot produce evil. The Eastern theologian Pseudo-Dionysius the Areopagite wrote in The Divine Names that all beings are good and that evil has no existence of its own. John of Damascus said that evil amounts simply to the absence of goodness, like darkness being an absence of light.

In the scholastic tradition, Thomas Aquinas presents an orderly account of evil influenced by Neoplatonism and Augustine. In the Summa Theologiae he tackles the questions concerning the good and the same concept. He says all nature is good because of its origin from God. He presents the idea of evil as a deficiency of nature. Other scholastic theologians and philosophers also developed this framework. One of them was Francisco Suárez.

=== Medieval Jewish thought ===
Maimonides and Saadia Gaon held a similar view that Evil did not stem from God, stating that it was due to the free will of human beings. Judah Halevi had a different view that God brings about evil in this world, either directly or through agents.

=== Early modern philosophy and poetry ===
The privation theory continued to influence early modern thought. In Part II of his Ethics, Spinoza writes that by "reality" and "perfection" he means the same thing, which Bertrand Russell interprets as agreement with the privation theory. Leibniz accepts a privative conception of evil and incorporates it into his theodicy in defense of the claim that the actual world is the "best of all possible worlds".

The theory also influenced Christian poetry and literary criticism. In his commentary on Paradise Lost, C. S. Lewis argues that John Milton assumes a broadly Augustinian view according to which evil is a parasitic privation of good, and later critics such as John Leonard have used this framework to interpret Adam and Eve's loss of original righteousness in the poem.

=== Modern and contemporary religious thought ===
For the Baháʼí faith, 'Abdu'l-Bahá espouses the privation account of evil. There is nothing evil at all, according to 'Abdu'l-Bahá. What God made is only good; evil is not part of the things God made. What makes it evil is simply the lack of something good, like life, light, and wealth.

There are modern Christian theologians and philosophers who also spoke of the concept of privation. Some neothomist authors and some analytic philosophers, including Oderberg, have embraced the privation theory of evil. Privation Theory's relation to debates concerning God's goodness, the issue of evil, and "evil-God challenge" has been examined in recent research too.

== Theodicy ==
Since the privation theory holds that evil is not a genuine positive entity created by God, the theory can explain the problem of evil in classical theism.

According to this theory, since God is the perfectly good being, He creates only good beings. Evil is neither made by God nor is it an object. It is a privation in created objects, meaning there is some deficiency of goodness in them. In order to provide His creatures with freedom and capacity to change, God allows the evil to exist because of failure in the created objects and processes to achieve goodness.

Therefore, God does not cause evil through His creative act as evil is not a positive entity created by Him. Rather, God allows the deficiency and disorder of proper goodness in the finite beings. As Augustine argues that moral evil is caused due to excess love of lower goods and natural evil of disease is caused due to corruption of good nature.

== Criticism ==
=== Pain and suffering ===
However, one criticism is that some of the evils appear to have an inherent badness about themselves other than being privations of good. According to Todd Calder, the evil of pain is not merely the privation of pleasure. Rather, the pain is inherently bad in itself rather than being a privation of some good.

Several approaches by which a privation theory might be able to account for the badness of pain are described by Adam Swenson and he finds problems with each one of them. Parker Haratine subscribes to an Augustinian privation theory of evil. According to him, the evil of pain arises out of a lack of proper order within a creature's nature.

Privation theory advocates argue that even if the experience of pain seems to be positive from one perspective, it actually is deprivation from another perspective. This is because according to them, the negative element arises out of the disorganization of the organism or out of the unhealthy state of functioning of the organism, and not out of pain itself.

=== Cruelty and moral wickedness ===
A third set of objections concerns the moral evils such as cruelty, malice and sadism. Bertrand Russell writes: "There are such things as pain and hatred and envy and cruelty, and they are not merely the privations of their opposites." He finds the privation theory to be overly optimistic.

According to Peter M. S. Hacker, taking pleasure from the sufferings of others is not a privation. Hacker states that even though "bad" means absence of good qualities at times, it often implies having certain qualities that are bad in themselves. In this regard, the privation theory tends to conceal the true nature of the wrong of moral evils since they are defined as mere absence of something good.

Supporters of the privation theory maintain that such evils as cruelty do not imply anything else than failing to actualize the good proper to humans. This evil is described as an unorderly orientation of the will and emotions without the necessary charity and justice characteristic of human nature.

=== Opposition between appearances ===
According to Immanuel Kant, the idea of Leibnizian privation was criticized in the chapter of "Amphiboly" of "Critique of Pure Reason". According to Kant, "it is impossible for two contradictory ideas to contradict one another, but reality exhibits real contradiction in experience." In experience, there is real opposition between positive causes which can destroy the effects of other causes, as in mechanics.

To Kant, Leibniz and his disciples have erroneously employed the rules of logic regarding concepts in practice. For this reason, they perceive all kinds of oppositions, including the fight of good against evil, as mere deficiencies. Kant, on the contrary, believes that moral evil does not exist merely as the deficiency of good but is rather the case of "radical evil," when the will adheres to an egoistic principle.

=== Criticism as theodicy ===
Some criticism have raised some objections more about how the theory treats the problem of evil rather than the theory itself. Even if evil is nothing but a privation and no real thing at all, the problem remains of why a good and powerful God would create a world in which there can be such privations. For example, Hacker questions why it makes sense that defining evil in terms of being similar to darkness would "exonerate God from the responsibility of allowing it — because, after all, he might well have created a universe of light or no universe at all."

Similarly, Calder contends that even though the privation theory is an attempt to solve the problem of evil, it does so inadequately. This theory may succeed in showing that evil does not come about by direct creation by God; however, it fails to offer an explanation for why God allows various privative evils to arise and to affect living things. Thus, contemporary debate about the problem of evil treats the privation theory as only one of many aspects of a broader Christian/theistic solution to the problem.
