= Post-Polio Health International =

Post-Polio Health International (PHI) is a relatively new name for a non-profit organization that officially began its work in 1960. For many years it was known in medical, rehabilitation, and disability circles variously as GINI, or the International Polio Network, or the Rehabilitation Gazette Network, or more familiarly as Gini’s Network, in honor of Gini Laurie, its founder and driving force until her death in 1989.

PHI’s mission is to enhance the lives, health, and independence of polio survivors, as well as those in the cross-disability category of home ventilator users, who are addressed through a subsidiary organization called the International Ventilator Users Network (IVUN). PHI’s headquarters are in St. Louis, Missouri, where it has a small paid staff. Otherwise, it is run by volunteers, including a board of directors and various advisory committees. Financial support comes from donors, sponsors, member/subscribers, and also from a group of “association members” consisting of local and regional polio support groups.

== Activities ==
PHI publishes two quarterly newsletters, Post-Polio Health and Ventilator-Assisted Living. It runs a telephone and e-mail answer-line during business hours, responding to requests from polio survivors, clinicians, researchers, and journalists. Its websites are updated almost every business day, and have a searchable archive of information on polio, post-polio syndrome, and independent living. It has recently begun to fund a modest amount of scientific research related to its mission – usually pilot studies, and occasionally to manage research projects for other organizations such as the Christopher and Dana Reeve Foundation. Increasingly, it is addressing the need to organize and fund a digitized archive of information on polio, and living with polio, that is relevant to all neuromuscular disabilities. And it has been working with other organizations to include rehabilitation for polio survivors in the current program for the worldwide eradication of polio.

PHI’s core constituency is in North America, but its networks of polio survivors, clinicians, scientists, and historians have always been widely international. This is true also of its medical and consumer advisory committees (the latter now being explicitly an international committee), attendance at its international conferences, the extent to which it communicates with polio and disability organizations in Europe, South America, Asia, Australasia, and Africa, and the extent to which its work is known by international organizations. PHI also holds a substantial archive of materials on living with polio.

PHI is not itself a support group, but rather a network and resource for such groups. It is not a treatment facility, but rather a directory to such facilities and a reference desk for information about specific polio or ventilator related problems. Its many publications such as its Handbook, its two quarterly newsletters, its informational brochures on the late effects of poliomyelitis (published in Chinese, Persian, French, German, Italian, Japanese, and Spanish), and its occasional formal statements on controversial issues such as physical exercise and on anesthesia for people with neuromuscular disabilities are widely referenced.

== History ==
After the polio epidemics in the United States ended, the March of Dimes had changed its mission from polio to birth defects; most of the special rehabilitation hospitals and clinics devoted to polio survivors were closing; clinical specialists in polio were scattering. Polio survivors (substantially more in 1960 than the CDC-estimated one million in the US who were still alive in 1995) were often isolated from the support needed to cope with maturing and aging with a significant physical disability.

PHI at first devoted itself to making sure polio survivors could stay in touch with each other as needed, and with clinicians who had special expertise with polio. These efforts evolved into a variety of publications aimed at providing authoritative information on health issues for polio survivors, and on mainstream opportunities for them – as well as for other people with significant physical disabilities – in education, employment, family life, travel, and leisure activities. The organization’s magazine (until 1985), The Rehabilitation Gazette, had those matters as its dominant themes.

By the late 1960s and early 1970s, PHI was also at the forefront of what has come to be called the independent living movement (or as Gini Laurie preferred to call it, the interdependent living movement) and was also involved in advocacy for the US 1973 Rehabilitation Act. Accessibility (of public places, education, governmental institutions, and of transportation and accommodations) was a major theme, as was the development of an effective system of home health care and personal attendants to ensure that people with serious physical disabilities would be able to live in the community of adults rather than as perpetual dependents within families or institutions.

Toward the end of the 1970s, PHI began to receive an increasing number of reports from polio survivors of new symptoms – a constellation of fatigue, decreased endurance, increased muscle weakness and pain – that sounded like a repeat of some of the early symptoms of poliomyelitis, or perhaps an accelerated aging process. In concert with clinicians, researchers, and polio survivors, PHI began to publish material on these “late effects of poliomyelitis,”. And in 1981 PHI convened the first of its international post-polio conferences to address this issue.

There have now been nine international PHI conferences on post-polio syndrome and other topics having to do with living and aging with polio. These “St. Louis conferences” as they are often called in polio circles, are not always held in St. Louis. The first in the series was held in Chicago, and the tenth was held in Warm Springs, Georgia, in 2009.

During the 1980s, as support groups for polio survivors began to form throughout the US and elsewhere, PHI offered help to such groups in various ways – especially through its conferences and publications (including directories of support groups and health care professionals), but also through arranging speakers, assisting with local or regional conferences, and sponsoring workshops. PHI is not itself a support group, but rather remains a network in support of such groups, and in support of individual polio survivors, clinicians, and researchers.

Until 1984, though always incorporated as a nonprofit organization, PHI had operated entirely with a large network of volunteers, organized and led by Gini Laurie. Financial support came from donors and subscribers to the Rehabilitation Gazette. But after the 1983 St. Louis conference, it was evident that a more formal organizational structure was required. Judith Raymond was hired as executive director in 1984, and took over PHI’s day-to-day operations as well as editorial work on its publications and organizational work on its conferences. She was succeeded in 1987 by Joan L. Headley, who served as executive director for 30 years, retiring in 2017. She was succeeded by Brian M. Tiburzi on September 1, 2017.
