= Fred Fay =

American disability rights activist

Frederick A. Fay (September 12, 1944 – August 20, 2011) was an early leader in the disability rights movement in the United States. Through a combination of direct advocacy, grassroots organizing among the various disability rights communities, building cross-disability coalitions between disparate disability organizations, and using technology to connect otherwise isolated disability constituencies, Fay worked diligently to raise awareness and pass legislation advancing civil rights and independent living opportunities for people with disabilities across the United States.

== Early life, education and beginnings in activism ==
Frederick Allan Fay was born on September 12, 1944, and raised in Washington, DC. At age 16, he sustained a cervical spinal cord injury, and started using a manual wheelchair for mobility. At 17, he launched his disability advocacy career by co-founding "Opening Doors," a counseling and information center.

Fay attended the University of Illinois, one of the nation's first wheelchair-accessible universities.

== Organisational affiliations and campaigning ==
A few years later, he was a founder of the Boston Center for Independent Living, the Massachusetts Coalition of Citizens with Disabilities, and of the American Coalition of Citizens with Disabilities. He was also the leader of the National Paraplegia Foundation, now known as the United Spinal Association, and established and presided over its first chapter in Washington D.C. The Association still follows Fay's core principles of self-sufficiency and independent living to this day.

Fay worked for many years at the Tufts New England Medical Center, until syringomyelia made it impossible for him to sit upright. For the past quarter century, Fay has worked from his home in Concord, Massachusetts. In the early years, he used a headset to speak and listen on the phone, plus a personal computer mounted on a stand near his motorized bed. He had an electronic workstation suspended over the bed.

It was from there that Fay launched the Justice for All forum that compiles and distributes disability rights information to his wide network of friends and allies. Fay made a short video with another disability rights notable, Roland W. Sykes, founder of DIMENET. He also appears in the 2011 disability rights documentary Lives Worth Living, where he argues that sheltered workshops should be resisted and that people with disabilities should be encouraged to live their lives independently.

== Recognition ==
Fay provided leadership to disability advocates. He was recognized in the movement for his irrepressible enthusiasm and optimism. Jonathan Young, chairman of the National Council on Disability, said, "Fred was one of the great early pioneers in disability advocacy...the depth and breadth of his knowledge and commitment was surpassed only by the life he lived and the legacy he leaves behind."

He won the 1997 Henry B. Betts Award for outstanding achievement in civil rights for Americans with disabilities. Fay was recognized for "flat-out advocacy" over several decades. He helped lead the nationwide efforts by disability advocates to secure passage of the Americans with Disabilities Act of 1990.

== Death ==
Fay died on August 20, 2011, at his home in Concord at the age of 66. He had a son, Derick Fay, and was survived by his companion Trish Irons.
