= Aid for the Elderly in Government Institutions =

Aid for the Elderly in Government Institutions (AEGIS) was a British pressure group that campaigned to improve the care of older people in long-stay wards of National Health Service psychiatric hospitals. The group was founded by Barbara Robb in 1965, and was active until Robb's death in 1976.

== History ==
On 21 January 1965, Barbara Robb visited an acquaintance, Amy Gibbs, an in-patient on a long stay back ward at Friern, psychiatric hospital, north London. There she stepped into the murky, long-standing, and, hardly shifting territory of older people's institutional care. She was shocked by what she saw, such as harshness from the nurses and patients' uniformed haircuts, institutional clothing, and lack of personal possessions and jobs.

Barbara started a diary of her visits because 'I felt that I would never have another really easy moment unless I did everything I could to try to right this situation' (Allen 1967).

Within months, she started AEGIS, Aid for the Elderly in Government Institutions which became one of the country's most determined pressure groups.

Throughout AEGIS's campaign, the National Health Service (NHS) staff, patients and their relatives, the media, and the media public responded in a diversity of ways. These ranged from the acknowledgment of the allegation of bad practice, such as by the press, to rejection, particularly in the tiers of National Health Service (NHS) administration.

AEGIS continued to convince the ministry of health and the regional hospital boards (RHBs) about the happenings in the hospitals that they oversaw. The study of AEGIS lies at the interface of the history of NHS policy and practice, mental health, mental hospitals, old age, and gender.

To understand the context and the background of AEGIS's campaign, and to highlight its contemporary relevance, several further issues are discussed in this introduction: early and mid-twentieth psychiatric hospital scandals, the handful of studies concerned directly with AEGIS, pressure groups, and, Ageism. AEGIS emerged into this climate of more pressure groups eager to make improvements in NHS and social care. AEGIS is the only one doing that specifically for around 60,000 older people in NHS long-stay psychiatric wards.
