= College of Staten Island =

Public college in Staten Island, New York

The City University of New York College of Staten Island
- Motto: Opportunity and Challenge
- Type: Public college
- Established: 1956; 70 years ago
- Parent institution: City University of New York
- Academic affiliations: CUMU
- President: Timothy G. Lynch
- Provost: Nathalia Glickman Holtzman
- Academic staff: 1,011 (2024)
- Administrative staff: 880 (2024)
- Students: 10,597 (Spring 2025)
- Undergraduates: 9,020 (Spring 2025)
- Postgraduates: 783 (Spring 2025)
- Location: Staten Island, New York, U.S.: 40°36′00″N 74°09′00″W (CSI Willowbrook)
- Campus: 204 acres; Suburban
- Colors: Dolphin Blue and Gray
- Nickname: Dolphins
- Sporting affiliations: NCAA Division II – ECC
- Mascot: Danny the Dolphin
- Website: csi.cuny.edu

The College of Staten Island (CSI) is a public college in Staten Island, New York, United States. It is one of the 11 four-year senior colleges within the City University of New York system (CUNY), and one of the two four-year senior colleges within the CUNY system with a program in engineering.

Programs in the liberal arts, sciences, engineering, and professional studies lead to PhD degrees, master's degrees, bachelor's and associate degrees. The bachelor's program includes selective membership in CUNY's Macaulay Honors College. The master's degree is awarded in 31 professional and liberal arts, sciences, and engineering fields of study. A clinical doctorate is awarded by the departments of Nursing, Education, and Physical Therapy. The College participates in doctoral programs of the CUNY Graduate Center in biology, chemistry, computer science, and physics, and at City College in engineering.

== History ==
The College of Staten Island is the product of a merger in 1976 of Staten Island Community College (SICC), founded in 1956, and Richmond College, founded in 1965. Richmond College had been threatened with closure because of New York City's financial crisis, while SICC, because of its status as a community college, received state support. The merger was particularly logical since the community college offered two-year degrees, while Richmond College was an "upper divisional" college (the third in the nation) that offered degrees to those in their third and fourth years of schooling.

The College of Staten Island has been located on the grounds of the former Willowbrook State School since 1993. At 204 acres, it is the largest campus by physical size in New York City. Before the relocation to Willowbrook, the College had a split campus, located at the former Staten Island Community College (in Sunnyside, on Todt Hill; the campus now houses the Michael J. Petrides School) and Richmond College (in St. George).

=== Presidents ===
1. Walter L. Willig, 1955–1968, was the inaugural President of College of Staten Island predecessor institution Staten Island Community College (SICC). His academic area of expertise was civil engineering.
2. Herbert Schueler, 1966–1973, was the first President of College of Staten Island predecessor institution Richmond College. His academic specialties were German literature and philosophy.
3. William M. Birenbaum, 1968–1976, served as President of College of Staten Island predecessor institution SICC until the merger of SICC and Richmond College in 1976, which resulted in the formation of the College of Staten Island. His academic focus was access to higher education for all.
4. Edmond Volpe, 1976–1994, an American literature scholar, retired in 1994 after having successfully handled the merger of the two colleges and the unification of the two campuses.
5. Marlene Springer, 1994–2007, an English and American literature scholar under whose leadership the College improved academic standards, introduced several master's programs, raised the level of the faculty, added research institutes, and introduced an Honors College, The Verrazzano School, and the CSI High School for International Studies. She retired in August 2007.
6. Tomás D. Morales, 2007–2012; arranged for a free shuttle from the Staten Island Ferry to the Willowbrook campus; announced in May 2012 that he would be leaving to become President of California State University at San Bernardino.
7. William J. Fritz, 2012–2021, geologist, appointed interim President on August 15, 2012, and as President on May 6, 2014. He resigned from the post on December 31, 2021.
8. Timothy G. Lynch, 2022–present, a higher education administrator, historian, and former Chief Academic Officer of Queensborough Community College, appointed interim president in January 2022, and as president on July 1, 2023.

== Willowbrook and Disability Rights ==
The College of Staten Island’s Willowbrook campus is located on part of the former site of the Willowbrook State School, which was closed in 1987 after both Jane Kurtin of the Staten Island Advance and then ABC’s Geraldo Riviera exposed its horrific conditions to the public, highlighting the School’s systemic warehousing of people with intellectual and developmental disabilities and the deplorable conditions under which they lived. This led to legislation to protect the rights of people with disabilities.

Following the establishment of its Willowbrook campus, the College has used its unique position to preserve and interpret the history of the Willowbrook State School and its significance in the disability rights movement. Through its Archives & Special Collections department, the College maintains the Willowbrook Archive, a repository of records, photographs, oral histories, publications, and other materials related to the institution and its legacy.

The campus is also home to The Willowbrook Mile, a 12-station memorial trail located on campus chronicling the history around Willowbrook State School and subsequent advocacy movements during and after its closure. The trail extends to neighboring grounds of the New York State Institute for Basic Research (IBR) and Office for People with Developmental Disabilities (OPWDD). In addition, the College hosts the annual Willowbrook Memorial Lecture, which seeks to educate about Willowbrook’s legacy, supports exhibitions, educational programs, and scholarly research related to disability history, human rights, and social justice, particularly through the School of Education and Social Work with an interdisciplinary minor in Disability Studies.

== Academics ==
Undergraduate demographics as of Spring 2025
Race and ethnicity	Total
White	40.1%
Hispanic	27.3%
Black/African American	11.7%
Asian	15.2%
Two or more races	3.4%
Non-Resident	2.1%
Economic diversity
Pell/Tap Eligible	57.4%
Not Pell Grant Eligible	42.6%

=== Research ===
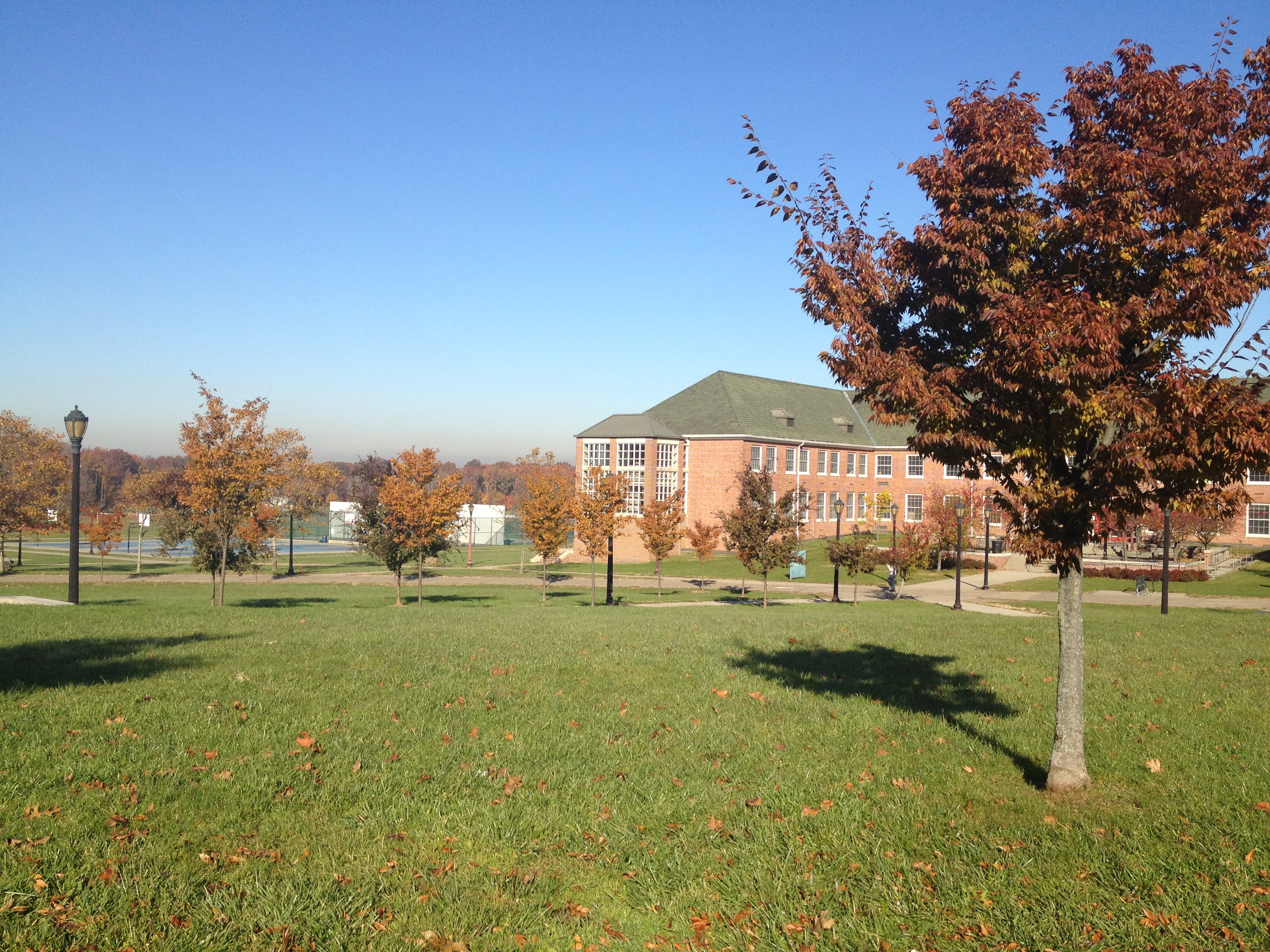
The college campus

CSI has more than 80 research labs, which include the Center for Developmental Neuroscience and Developmental Disabilities (CDN), the Staten Island Breast Cancer Research Initiative, the CUNY Interdisciplinary High-Performance Computing Center (HPCC). The HPCC provides advanced high-performance computing technology resources and corresponding technical assistance to faculty and students, and is among the largest academic computing facilities in the New York metropolitan area.

Research conducted through the CDN has focused on autism, Alzheimer's disease, traumatic brain injury, spinal cord injury, epilepsy, and neurodegenerative disorders. Center-affiliated faculty have secured grants from the National Institutes of Health, National Science Foundation, New York State Department of Health, and other public and private funding organizations.

The College of Staten Island Library houses a collection of more than 175,000 print volumes, over 1.6 million eBooks, and more than 200,000 electronic journals and newspapers. In addition to providing research resources, the library offers information literacy instruction and online educational materials.

The Library’s Archives & Special Collections preserves materials related to the history of Staten Island, the College of Staten Island and its predecessor institutions, Richmond College and Staten Island Community College. Its holdings include manuscript collections, photographs, oral histories, and printed materials documenting local political, social, and cultural history. The archives also house the Willowbrook Collection, which documents the history of the Willowbrook State School and the experiences of its residents, families, and staff. Holdings comprise approximately 1,400 linear feet of archival materials and more than 5,000 printed items.

=== Rankings ===
Academic rankings

National
- Forbes: 451
- WSJ/College Pulse: 601-800

The College of Staten Island’s latest accolades include Newsweek designating CSI ”, multiple members of its faculty have been named to the Stanford University–Elsevier “Top 2%” Scientists List for 2025, the Lucille and Jay Chazanoff School of Business earning accreditation from AACSB International, recognition from U.S. News & World Report as a Top Public School and Top Performer in Social Mobility, Washington Monthly rating the College in the top 25 percent on its List of Best-Bang-for-the-Buck Colleges, Forbes honoring CSI for Return on Investment for three straight years, and consistent recognition as a Military-Friendly® School, among others.

=== Departments, Programs, and Academics ===
The College of Staten Island offers a comprehensive range of undergraduate, graduate, certificate, and professional development programs. The College grants associate's, bachelor's, master's, advanced certificate, and doctoral degrees and serves students pursuing careers in the arts, sciences, business, education, healthcare, public service, and technology.

Academic Schools

CSI's academic programs are organized into four schools:

Division of Humanities and Social Sciences

The division includes nine departments: English, History, Media Culture, Performing & Creative Arts, Philosophy, Political Science & Global Affairs, Psychology, Sociology & Anthropology, and World Languages & Literatures. The division also includes the major in Science, Letters, & Society; Interdisciplinary majors and minors in African & African Diaspora Studies, American Studies, International Studies; and Women’s, Gender, & Sexuality Studies; as well as minors in Disability Studies; East Asian Studies; Latin American Caribbean, and Latina/o Studies; and a Graduate Certificate in Autism Spectrum Disorders. The Dean is Dr. Sarolta Takács.

Lucille and Jay Chazanoff School of Business

The School of Business offers undergraduate and graduate programs designed to prepare students for careers in the private, public, and nonprofit sectors. Areas of study include Accounting, Finance, Economics, Management, Marketing, International Business, and Business Analytics. The school emphasizes experiential learning through internships, applied research, and partnerships with businesses and organizations throughout the New York metropolitan area. The Dean is Susan Holak.

School of Education and Social Work

The School of Education and Social Work prepares teachers, counselors, and educational leaders through undergraduate and graduate programs leading to New York State certification. Programs in the Department of Education include childhood education, special education, literacy education, educational leadership, school counseling, and TESOL. and related fields; the Department of Social Work prepares students for entry-level generalist urban practice and provides a local and global context for understanding and addressing the experiences of people and societies. The department also offers a unique Master of Social Work (MSW) degree, which focuses on generalist practice in the first year and on disability studies in either clinical practice or macro practice in the specialization year. The Dean is Burnett Joiner.

School of Science and Technology

The Division of Science and Technology is one of the College of Staten Island's principal academic divisions, offering undergraduate, graduate, and doctoral-level programs in the natural sciences, computer science, engineering, mathematics, nursing, physical therapy, and related STEM disciplines. The division encompasses the departments of Biology, Chemistry, Computer Science, Engineering and Environmental Science, Mathematics, Nursing, Physical Therapy, and Physics and Astronomy.

The division supports research, scholarship, and workforce development through interdisciplinary centers, laboratory facilities, and partnerships with government, industry, and educational organizations. Its Nursing program is among the College's most prominent and serves as a major pipeline for healthcare professionals throughout Staten Island and the New York metropolitan region, helping address workforce needs in hospitals, clinics, and community health settings. The Dean is Ralf Peetz.

Undergraduate and Graduate Programs

CSI offers more than 60 undergraduate majors and programs, as well as a wide range of graduate degrees and advanced certificates. Graduate offerings include master's programs in disciplines such as education, nursing, business, psychology, social work, and the sciences, along with doctoral-level study through select CUNY doctoral programs and professional practice degrees.

Students may also pursue minors, concentrations, and interdisciplinary programs that combine coursework across multiple academic fields.

CSI's Women's Studies program was founded in 1972 and is considered the second oldest Women's Studies Program in the United States and the first college to graduate a student with a Bachelor of Arts in the field.

Honors and Specialized Programs

CSI participates in CUNY's Macaulay Honors College, an academically rigorous honors program that provides selected students with enhanced academic opportunities, leadership development, research experiences, and cultural enrichment. The College also operates the Verrazzano School, an interdisciplinary honors program that emphasizes academic excellence, civic engagement, undergraduate research, and experiential learning.

Additional opportunities include undergraduate research programs, faculty-mentored scholarship, internships, service-learning initiatives, and study abroad experiences.

Continuing Education and Professional Development

Through its Division of Continuing Education and Professional Development, CSI offers non-degree educational opportunities for adult learners, professionals, and community members. Programs include workforce training, professional certification preparation, continuing education courses, and lifelong learning opportunities. Areas of instruction include healthcare occupations, information technology, business and management, construction and skilled trades, education, English language learning, and workforce readiness. Many programs are designed in collaboration with industry partners and government agencies to address regional workforce needs and support economic development.

Workforce Development

CSI serves as a workforce development resource for Staten Island and the greater New York City region. The College provides career-focused training, professional certifications, apprenticeships, and upskilling opportunities for individuals seeking employment advancement or career transitions. Workforce initiatives frequently focus on high-demand sectors such as healthcare, technology, education, business services, and public sector employment. Programs are designed to connect students and working professionals with industry-recognized credentials and pathways to employment.

Accreditation

The College of Staten Island is accredited by the Middle States Commission on Higher Education. Numerous academic programs maintain specialized accreditation through professional organizations in fields such as business, nursing, education, social work, and healthcare, reflecting adherence to disciplinary standards and professional requirements.

Study Abroad

Study abroad opportunities allow students (both CUNY and non-CUNY) to earn academic credit while gaining international experience through faculty-led programs, exchange partnerships, and independent study opportunities around the world. Programs vary by year and discipline and have included destinations across Europe, Asia, Latin America, Africa, and Australia. Recent programs have included Australia, Ecuador, Japan, France, and the United Kingdom. CSI is a founding member of the College Consortium for International Studies (CCIS).

== Campus facilities ==
The College of Staten Island's 204-acre Willowbrook campus includes academic buildings, research laboratories, athletic facilities, student housing, and performance venues organized around two academic quadrangles. Notable facilities include the Center for the Arts, the Astrophysical Observatory, the Sports and Recreation Center, the Library, the Innovation Hub, and the CUNY High-Performance Computing Center.

Dolphin Cove

Dolphin Cove, opened in 2013, was the College's first residential housing complex and accommodates more than 600 students in apartment-style residences, and includes academic support, recreation, and community spaces.

Astrophysical Observatory

The College of Staten Island Observatory is the largest publicly accessible observatory in New York City and serves as a center for research, teaching, and public astronomy programs. Operated by the Department of Physics and Astronomy, the facility has been designated an official asteroid and comet research station by the International Astronomical Union and carries observatory code IAU 294. Its primary instrument is a 16-inch computerized Schmidt-Cassegrain telescope.

Center for the Arts

Opened in 1996, the Center for the Arts is one of Staten Island's leading performing arts venues, hosting professional and community performances, exhibitions, lectures, and educational programs. The facility includes the Springer Concert Hall, Williamson Theatre, Recital Hall, and Lecture Hall, as well as exhibition and event spaces used by both the College and the broader community.

Sports and Recreation Center

The Sports and Recreation Center serves as the home of CSI Athletics and includes facilities for varsity sports, recreation, fitness, swimming, and community events. The complex includes an indoor swimming pool, basketball and volleyball courts, fitness facilities, racquet courts, and outdoor fields and courts used for intercollegiate athletics and community programming.

CUNY High-Performance Computing Center

The CUNY High-Performance Computing Center (CUNY-HPCC) provides advanced computational infrastructure and research support for faculty, researchers, and students across the City University of New York. The center supports interdisciplinary research in areas including data science, artificial intelligence, engineering, environmental science, and computational modeling.

Innovation Hub and Research Facilities

The Innovation Hub supports entrepreneurship, workforce development, and applied research in areas including artificial intelligence, robotics, virtual reality, and emerging technologies. Located within the Lighthouse Point development in St. George, the facility was developed with support from New York State's Downtown Revitalization Initiative and serves students, entrepreneurs, researchers, and local businesses.

Campus Center

The Campus Center serves as the primary hub for student life and houses Student Government, student organizations, dining facilities, wellness services, and community spaces. It is also home to WSIA-FM, Staten Island's only FM radio station.

Chazanoff School of Business

The Lucille and Jay Chazanoff School of Business is relocating to the renovated historic 2M Building, which will feature modern classrooms, a Center for Big Data Business Analytics, and the Con Edison Trading Room, which provides students with access to real-time financial data and market simulation technologies.

== Athletics ==
Dolphins wordmark

The College of Staten Island athletic teams are known as the Dolphins. The College was accepted as a provisional member of the National Collegiate Athletic Association (NCAA) Division II in 2019, and joined the East Coast Conference (ECC) as a full member in the 2020–2021 academic year.^{[22]} The College previously competed at the Division III level as a member of the City University of New York Athletic Conference (CUNYAC) from 1979–1980 to 2019–2020.^{[23]} CSI began the transition to Division II during the 2019–2020 season and completed the transition process following the 2021-2022 academic year.^{[22]}

The men's and women's swimming and diving teams have competed in the Northeast 10 Conference since the 2023–2024 season, formerly competing in the Metropolitan Swimming Conference (METS), as the ECC doesn't sponsor the sport. The College competes in 14 sports: men's sports are baseball, basketball, cross country, soccer, swimming and diving, and track and field (indoor and outdoor); women's sports are basketball, cross country, soccer, softball, swimming and diving, and track and field (indoor and outdoor).

Collectively, CSI’s athletics teams accumulated 108 CUNYAC Championships between 1977–2018, making 38 appearances in NCAA Division III National Tournaments in team sports, with many other appearances at NCAA regional and national championship meets in individual sports such as swimming and diving, cross country, etc. The College also claimed CUNYAC Commissioner’s Cup titles in 2001 and 2018, awarded to CUNY’s most successful athletics institution. They currently join fellow CUNY-school Queens College as the only NCAA Division II public schools in New York. In their short time in Division II (2019–present) they have boasted multiple postseason appearances within the East Coast Conference and the Northeast 10.

Prior to entering NCAA Division II, the Dolphins racked up an impressive list of CUNYAC and Division III accomplishments.

Club sports include a women’s flag football team that competes in the National Collegiate Flag Football League (NCFFL)—they won the NCFFL championship in 2025. Other club sports are cheerleading, women’s bowling, esports, and a competitive dance team.

CSI athletic facilities include the Sports and Recreation Center, a 1,200-seat arena that serves as the home for basketball and intramural sports. Outdoor facilities include a synthetic turf soccer field (Dolphin Soccer Park), adjacent is a multipurpose field encircled by a quarter-mile track, and full turf softball (CSI Softball Complex) and baseball fields. The ‘College of Staten Island Baseball Complex’ was the home of the Staten Island Yankees before they moved to Richmond County Bank Ballpark in 2001. The ballpark had a capacity of 2,500 people and opened in 1999.^{[24]}

== Notable people ==
=== Faculty/staff ===
- Sos Agaian, Distinguished Professor of Computer Science, named among top 2% of scholars in 2025
- Zaghloul Ahmed, Professor, and Chair and Program Director of the Physical Therapy Department, a leading figure in the field of bioelectronic medicine
- Nancy Bogen, Professor Emerita of English, producer of mixed media combining photography, poetry, and music
- Patricia J. Brooks, Professor of Psychology, director of the Language Learning Laboratory
- Ava Chin, Professor of Creative Nonfiction and Journalism, author of Mott Street: A Chinese American Family’s Story of Exclusion and Homecoming. Her writing has appeared in The New York Times (“Urban Forager”), The Washington Post, the Los Angeles Times, and The Village Voice, among others.
- Grace M. Cho, CSI Associate Professor, Sociology and Anthropology, has received a number of honors, such as a 2022 Asian/Pacific American (APA) Award for Adult Non-Fiction and was named to the Nonfiction Longlist of the National Book Awards for her book, Tastes Like War: A Memoir.
- Ashley Dawson, Distinguished Professor of English
- Ismael García-Colón, Professor, Anthropology, is the recipient of the Frank Bonilla Book Award from the Puerto Rican Studies Association for his book, Colonial Migrants at the Heart of Empire: Puerto Rican Workers on U.S. Farms.
- Li Ge, Professor of Physics and Astronomy, highlighted in a recent Phys.org article exploring a groundbreaking study demonstrating how multiple streams of light can be guided simultaneously through chip-based networks using principles of topology.
- Donna B. Gerstle, Director, Center for Environmental Science; Executive Director and Principal Investigator, Staten Island Breast Cancer Research Initiative
- David A. Gerstner, Professor of Cinema Studies in CSI’s Department of Media Culture, received the Order of Arts and Letters (Chevalier l’ordre des arts et des lettres) from the French Ministry of Culture in 2024.
- Jean Halley, Professor of Sociology, focusing on issues of social power
- Dr. Seokyoun Hwang, Assistant Professor, Accounting, the Lucille and Jay Chazanoff School of Business, has twice received a Deloitte Academic Research Award.
- Tyehimba Jess, Professor of English, recipient of 2017 Pulitzer Prize for Poetry
- Arnie Kantrowitz, late Professor of English, gay rights activist, and author of the memoir Under the Rainbow and a biography of Walt Whitman
- Charles Liu, Professor of Astrophysics, former director of the Verrazzano School and of the William E. Macaulay Honors College at CSI
- Michael Mandiberg, Professor of Media Culture, who recently completed a five-year-long project commissioned by the Whitney Museum of American Art
- Cate Marvin, Professor of English, writer of poetry and recipient of 2015 Guggenheim Fellowship
- Dan McCloskey, Professor of Psychology, research on social activity and low-oxygen adaptation of African naked mole rats, awarded The Presidential Early Career Award for Scientists and Engineers by President Obama
- Nuria Morgado, Professor of Hispanic Studies, named 2025 Woman of the Year by the Rosalía Arteaga Glocal Women Foundation and was part of Mujeres Destacadas 2026, an annual distinction presented by El Diario honoring influential Latina leaders across the New York region
- Reece Peck, Associate Professor of Media Culture, author of Fox Populism: Branding Conservatism as Working Class
- Sean Thatcher, Lecturer, Engineering and Environmental Science, Coordinator of the Earth and Environmental Science Program, who was part of the team receiving the 2025 American Geophysical Union’s (AGU) Award for Advancing Inclusive Excellence in STEM
- Richard R. Veit, Professor of Biology and seabird ecologist
- Oswaldo Zavala, CSI Professor of Latin American Literature and Culture, author of Los cárteles no existen (Drug Cartels Do Not Exist)

=== Alumni ===
- Jo Ann Bland, late civil rights activist in Alabama
- Justin Brannan, New York City Council member for the 47th district from 2018 to 2025; former musician
- Joe Causi, “Brooklyn’s Own” legendary radio host and disk jockey of 40+ years WCBS-FM 101.1
- Alexa Criscitiello ’12 (AKA A.A Christi), Managing Editor of broadwayworld.com
- Alfred B. Curtis Jr. ‘86, previously served as president and CEO of the United Nations Development Corporation; former NYC Commissioner of the Department of Youth and Community Development/Department of Youth Services; Republican candidate for a state senate seat in Staten Island and Brooklyn; former president of the Staten Island NAACP; former CUNY Board trustee
- Andrea Dalzell ’17, ‘19, nurse and disability rights activist
- Jerry Ferrara, film and television actor
- Sara M. Gonzalez, former New York City Council member for the 38th District from 2002 to 2013
- Vinny Guadagnino ‘09, reality television personality, best known for MTV's Jersey Shore
- Kamillah Hanks, New York City Council member for the 49th District
- Muriel A. Howard, President of Buffalo State College, 1996–2009, former president of American Association of State Colleges and Universities (AASCU)
- Raj Amit Kumar, filmmaker and writer; best known for Unfreedom, which is banned in India
- Danielle Karagach, professional dancer and choreographer
- Lynda Blackmon Lowery '82, late civil rights activist, one of the youngest to march on Selma, AL in 1965
- Jeremy Luke, film and television actor
- Bahman Maghsoudlou ‘90, filmmaker and film historian, named to the CSI Alumni Hall of Fame in 2002^{[citation needed]}
- Josh Martinez, Radio personality, Z100, New York and Kiss FM, Chicago
- Faye Michalakos ’07, ’11 MA, a middle school math teacher honored as one of the New York City Department of Education's 2017 Big Apple Award winners
- Michael Mulgrew ‘89, fifth President of the United Federation of Teachers
- Angelina Marie Pivarnick, reality television personality, best known for MTV's Jersey Shore and Jersey Shore: Family Vacation
- Joe Rigby ‘89, jazz saxophonist
- Marguerite Maria Rivas ‘79, Staten Island Poet Laureate
- Ilir Sela, Founder and CEO of Slice
- Jessica Scarcella-Spanton ‘11, New York State Senator from the 23rd District
- Gene Simmons, co-lead singer and bassist from the band Kiss
- Kevin Sussman, actor in The Big Bang Theory
