= Bill Fritz =

Bill or William Fritz may refer to:

- Bill Fritz (pole vaulter) (1892–1941), American athlete who competed in the 1912 Summer Olympics
- William Fritz (sprinter) (1914–1995), Canadian athlete who competed in the 1936 Summer Olympics
- William Harold Fritz (1928–2009), geologist with the Geological Survey of Canada
- William J. Fritz, American geologist

== See also ==
- J. W. Fritz, known as Will, Dallas police officer
