= Slice =

Slice may refer to:

- Cutting

== Food and beverage ==
- A portion of bread, pizza, or other food item that is cut flat and thin
- Slice (drink), a line of fruit-flavored soft drinks
- A serving or cooking utensil, such as a Fish slice

=== In Australia and New Zealand ===
- A category of sweet dishes also known as bar cookies
- A category of savory dishes similar to a quiche such as zucchini slice

== In arts and entertainment ==
=== Music ===
- Slice (album), a Five for Fighting album, 2009
  - "Slice" (song), a 2009 song by Five for Fighting
- Slice, a 1998 album by Arthur Loves Plastic
- Slices (band)
- Slice (EP), 2023 by O.

=== Other uses in arts and entertainment ===
- Slice (TV channel), a Canadian TV channel formerly known as Life Network
- Slice (2009 film), a Thai crime film
- Slice (2018 film), an American horror comedy film
- Slice (G.I. Joe), a fictional character in the G.I. Joe universe
- Slice, a region in Terry Pratchett's Discworld stories, see Discworld (world)#The Ramtops
- Slice, in lieu of "chapter", in Norman Lindsay's children's book The Magic Pudding
- Slice (painting), a 2020 painting by Jasper Johns

== In mathematics, science, and technology ==
=== Computing ===
- Time slice, the time during which a process runs
- Time slice multiplexing, a form of processor scheduling
- Slice (disk), a logical division or partition of a hard disk
- Array slicing, an operation that extracts certain elements from an array
- Bit slicing, a technique for constructing a processor from modules of smaller bit width
- Specification Language for Ice, Internet Communications Engine

=== Mathematics ===
- Slice category, in category theory, a special case of a comma category
- Slice genus, in knot theory
- Slice knot, in knot theory
- Slice sampling, a Monte Carlo sampling method
- Projection-slice theorem, a theorem about Fourier transforms
- Bers slice in theory of Kleinian groups

=== Other uses in science and technology ===
- Slice preparation or brain slice, an in vitro technique for neurophysiology
- Slice (electronics), a wafer of semiconductor material used in circuits

== Sports ==
- Backspin, in racquet sports or golf; also known as "slice" in racquet sports
- Golf slice, or "slice", a golf shot in which the ball curves sideways in flight due to sidespin, usually unintentionally, as a result of a mishit
- Kimbo Slice (1974–2016), a mixed-martial arts fighter
- Barry "Slice" Rohrssen (1960–), an American basketball coach

== Business and other uses ==
- Slice, Inc., a company that designs and produces box cutters and other cutting tools
- Rakuten Slice, a company that measures digital commerce and provides online shopping services
- Slice (app), an online food ordering platform for independent pizzerias
- Slice Small Finance Bank, Indian small finance bank

== See also ==
- Slicing (disambiguation)
- Splice (disambiguation)
- Part (disambiguation)
