= Andrea Dalzell =

American nurse

- Other names: The Seated Nurse
- Education: College of Staten Island (BS, BSN)
- Occupation: Nurse
- Website: theseatednurse.com

Andrea Dalzell is an American nurse, disability rights activist, and content creator. Dalzell is the first wheelchair-using registered nurse in the state of New York and advocates for disabled healthcare workers on social media.

== Early life and education ==
Born and raised in Brooklyn, New York, Dalzell was diagnosed with transverse myelitis at age 5. Throughout childhood, she would alternately use a wheelchair, a walker, and crutches, and started using a wheelchair fulltime by the age of 12.

Dalzell earned two degrees, one in biology and one in neuroscience, from the College of Staten Island. Originally interested in medical school, Dalzell switched to nursing after realizing that "doctors treat the Disease and I never wanted to look at someone as a disease, but as a whole person. Nurses do that and that’s where my mindset shifted to nursing". Dalzell was awarded her Bachelor of Science in Nursing and became a registered nurse in 2018.

== Career and advocacy ==
Any person, with any type of disability can be a nurse. The misconception comes with the fact that with a disability means you’re incapable. Every single person’s ability is different. What I am able to do at my injury level, may not be another person’s ability at the same level.

— Andrea Dalzell

After becoming a registered nurse, Dalzell applied to, and was turned down for, 76 different clinical nurse positions. She found work as both a school nurse and as a camp health director during this period. In 2020, the COVID-19 pandemic led to a high demand for nurses, and Dalzell landed a job as an ICU nurse based on her experience with ventilators. Dalzell became the first wheelchair-using registered nurse in the state of New York.

Dalzell cites multiple instances of being questioned on her qualification to perform as a clinical nurse, including "professors doubting her capabilities and the constant pressure to prove herself". On social media, she is known as The Seated Nurse, and uses her platform to advocate for disabled healthcare workers. She trains as a boxer to help build her strength for activities such as CPR. Dalzell was asked by Apple Inc. to appear in a commercial for the Apple Watch, discussing how the watch has helped her physical training.

== Awards and honors ==
- In 2015, Dalzell won the title of Ms. Wheelchair New York
- In 2020, Dalzell received the Craig H. Neilsen Visionary Prize
- In 2021, Dalzell was named New Mobility’s Person of the Year
