= Willowbrook State School =

Institution for disabled children in New York City (1947–1987)

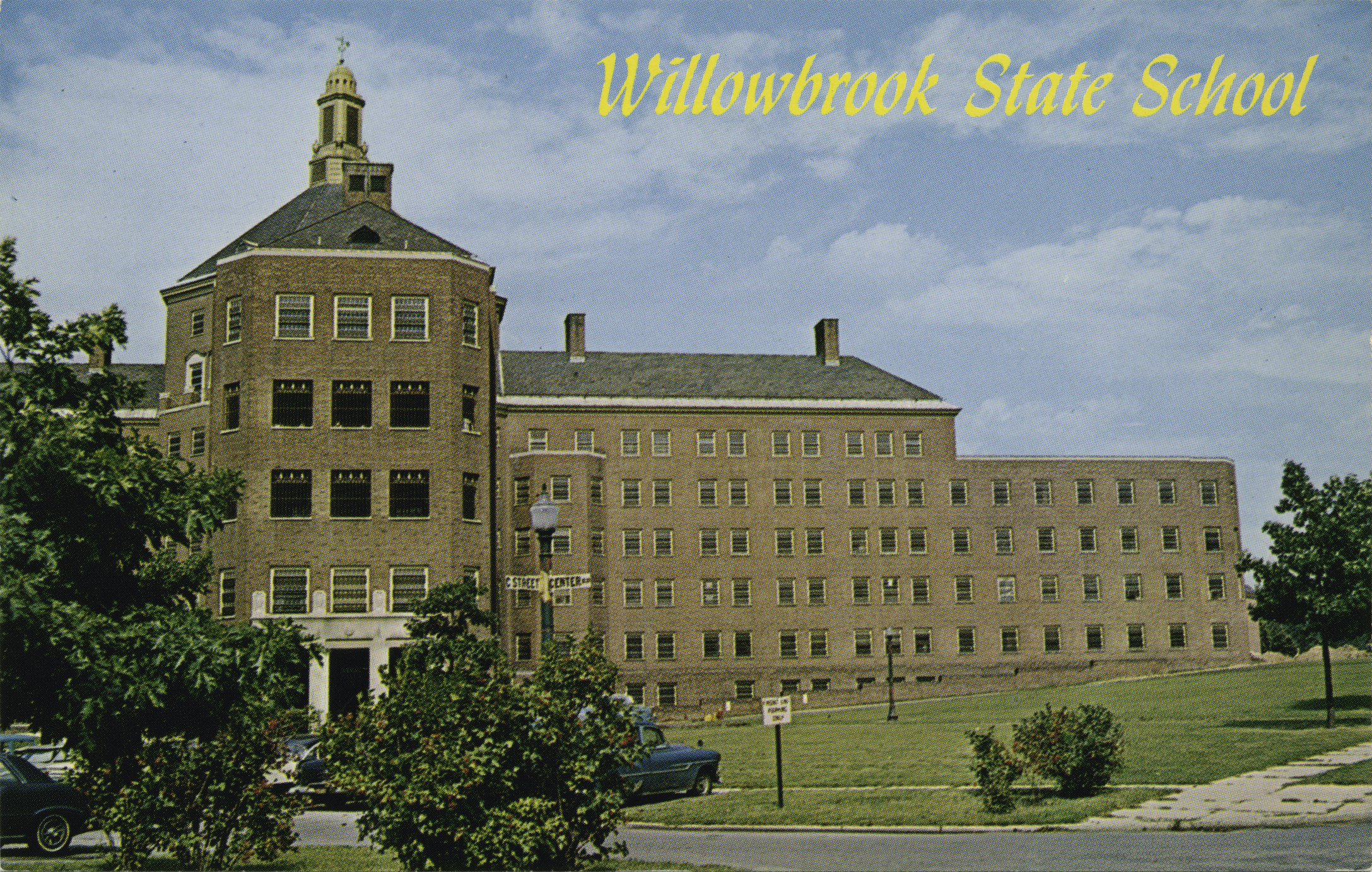
- Postcard of the school hospital building

Location
- Staten Island, New York, U.S. 40°35′59″N 74°09′06″W

Information
- Opened: 1947
- Closed: 1987

Willowbrook State School was a state-supported institution for children with intellectual disabilities in the Willowbrook neighborhood of Staten Island in New York City, which operated from 1947 until 1987.

The school was designed for 4,000, but by 1965, it had a population of 6,000. At the time, it was the biggest state-run institution for people with mental disabilities in the United States. Living conditions at the school were crowded and filthy, and during its first decade of operation, outbreaks of hepatitis, primarily hepatitis A, were common. Medical researchers initially carried out research on the disease and its effects at the school, which was discontinued after public outcry. The conditions and questionable medical practices and experiments prompted US Senator Robert F. Kennedy to call it a "snake pit". The institution gained national infamy in 1972, when Geraldo Rivera did an exposé on the conditions there. Public opposition led to its closure in 1987, and to federal civil rights legislation protecting people with disabilities. A February 2020 New York Times investigation found that the survivors of Willowbrook continued to be abused in smaller group homes.

A portion of the grounds and some of the buildings were incorporated into the campus of the College of Staten Island, which moved to Willowbrook in the early 1990s. Records and documentation relating to the experiences of the school residents and staff, and the activities of parents and caregivers who brought about the closure of the school, are held by the College of Staten Island Library Archives.

== Construction and early conversion ==
In 1938, plans were drawn up to build a facility for people with intellectual disabilities on 375 acres (152 ha) in the Willowbrook section of Staten Island. The residents did not want a facility of the sort in the area, because they feared an uptick in crime. Construction was completed in 1942, but instead of opening for its original purpose, the facility was converted into a US Army hospital and named Halloran General Hospital, after the late Colonel Paul Stacey Halloran. Following World War II, proposals were introduced to turn the site over to the Veterans Administration, but in October 1947, the New York State Department of Mental Hygiene opened its facility there. Falling back on previous plans, they began admitting children and adults to the "school". The institution was named Willowbrook State School.

== Hepatitis studies ==
Throughout the first decade of its operation, outbreaks of hepatitis, primarily hepatitis A, were common at Willowbrook. This led to controversial medical studies being carried out there by the researchers Saul Krugman of New York University and Robert W. McCollum of Yale University. Between 1956 and 1971, Krugman and McCollum monitored subjects to gauge the effects of gamma globulin in combating hepatitis. One result of the research was a better understanding of the differences between serum hepatitis, which is spread by blood transfusions, and infectious hepatitis, which is spread directly from person to person and is the more common form. A public outcry forced the research project and medical studies to be discontinued.

The pediatric immunologist Paul A. Offit described Krugman's studies as follows:

In an effort to control outbreaks of hepatitis, the medical staff at Willowbrook consulted Saul Krugman.... Krugman found that hepatitis developed in 90 percent of children admitted to Willowbrook soon after their arrival. Although it was known that hepatitis was caused by a virus, it wasn't known how hepatitis virus spread, whether it could be prevented, or how many types of viruses caused the disease. Krugman used the children of Willowbrook to answer those questions. One of his studies involved feeding live hepatitis virus from others' stool samples to sixty healthy children. Krugman watched as their skin and eyes turned yellow and their livers got bigger. He watched them vomit and refuse to eat. All the children fed hepatitis virus became ill, some severely. Krugman reasoned that it was justifiable to inoculate retarded children at Willowbrook with hepatitis virus because most of them would get hepatitis anyway. But by purposefully giving the children hepatitis, Krugman increased that chance to 100 percent.

According to the vaccinologist Maurice Hilleman, "They [the Willowbrook studies] were the most unethical medical experiments ever performed on children in the United States." The historian David Rothman has noted that, "The research was even included in Henry Beecher's 1966 New England Journal of Medicine listing of 'ethically dubious' experiments." The bioethicist Art Caplan has stated that, "The Willowbrook studies were a turning point in how we thought about medical experiments on retarded children... Children inoculated with hepatitis virus had no chance to benefit from the procedure—only the chance to be harmed."

== Scandals and abuses ==
By 1965, Willowbrook housed over 6,000 intellectually disabled people, despite having a maximum capacity of 4,000. US Senator Robert F. Kennedy toured the institution in 1965 and proclaimed that individuals in the overcrowded facility were "living in filth and dirt, their clothing in rags, in rooms less comfortable and cheerful than the cages in which we put animals in a zoo", and he offered a series of recommendations for improving conditions. Although the hepatitis study had been discontinued, the residential school's reputation was that of a warehouse for New York City's mentally disabled people, many of whom were presumably abandoned there by their families, foster care agencies, or other systems designed to care for them. Donna J. Stone, an advocate for mentally disabled children and victims of child abuse, gained access to the school by posing as a recent social work graduate. She then shared her observations with members of the press.

A series of articles in local newspapers, including the Staten Island Advance and the Staten Island Register, described the crowded, filthy living conditions at Willowbrook, and the negligent treatment of some of its residents. Jane Kurtin was the first reporter to write a story about Willowbrook State School after she visited it in order to cover a demonstration that social workers and parents of the residents had organized.

In early 1972, Geraldo Rivera, then an investigative reporter for WABC-TV in New York, conducted a series of investigations at Willowbrook, uncovering a host of deplorable conditions, including overcrowding, inadequate sanitary facilities, and physical and sexual abuse of residents by members of the school's staff. The exposé, titled "Willowbrook: The Last Great Disgrace", garnered national attention and won Rivera a Peabody Award. Rivera later appeared on the nationally televised Dick Cavett Show with film of patients at the school. As a result, a class-action lawsuit was filed against the State of New York by the parents of 5,000 residents of Willowbrook in federal court on March 17, 1972. This was known as New York ARC v. Rockefeller.

Rivera's exposé motivated John Lennon and Yoko Ono to hold a benefit concert for Willowbrook, performing two shows at Madison Square Garden on August 30, 1972. A recording of the concert was released after Lennon's death as Live in New York City, and the concert is the centerpiece of the 2024 documentary One to One: John & Yoko.

In 1975, a consent judgment was signed, committing New York state to improve community placement for the now-designated "Willowbrook Class". The publicity generated by the case was a major contributing factor to the passage of a federal law—the Civil Rights of Institutionalized Persons Act of 1980.

According to a February 2020 New York Times investigation, "[t]hat vow has been broken: Many of the institution's 2,300 alumni who are alive today still suffer from mistreatment." The Times reported that in 2019, there were "97 reported allegations of physical abuse by group home workers against Willowbrook alumni..." as well as "34 allegations of psychological abuse and hundreds more of neglect and other mistreatment, like improper use of restraints or seclusion, medication errors and theft." Investigations were conducted by the New York State Office for People With Developmental Disabilities but were unable to prove abuse, claiming that "Strong union protections allowed them to block their dismissals in arbitration." Bronx County District Attorney Darcel Clark investigated one facility that housed Willowbrook survivors but found insufficient evidence for abuse, witnesses not willing to come forward, and victims not able to speak for themselves. "It's not whether or not it happened," she said. "It's what could we prove."

== Closure ==
In 1975, a Willowbrook consent decree was signed that committed New York state to improve community placement for the now-designated "Willowbrook Class".

In 1983, the state of New York announced plans to close Willowbrook, which had been renamed the Staten Island Developmental Center in 1974. By the end of March 1986, the number of residents housed there had dwindled to 250, and the last children left the grounds on September 17, 1987. After the center closed, the site became the focus of intense local debate about what should be done with the property. In 1989, a portion of the land was acquired by the city of New York, with the intent of using it to establish a new campus for the College of Staten Island (CSI), and the new campus opened at Willowbrook in 1993. Within the year, one of CSI's two other existing campuses, located in the Sunnyside neighborhood, was closed, renovated, and reopened in 1995 as the home of the new K-12 Michael J. Petrides School. The rest of Willowbrook's original property remained under the administration of the Office for People with Developmental Disabilities—an agency of New York State—housing the New York State Institute for Basic Research in Developmental Disabilities, and the Staten Island Developmental Disabilities Service Office.

On February 25, 1987, the federal court approved the Willowbrook "1987 Stipulation", which set forth guidelines that required OMRDD (Office of Mental Retardation and Developmental Disabilities; renamed the Office for People with Developmental Disabilities in July 2010) community placement for the "Willowbrook Class".

== Former students ==
Willowbrook State Hospital is mentioned in the 2009 documentary movie Cropsey as having reportedly housed the convicted child kidnapper Andre Rand, who had previously worked there as an orderly.

In 2011, a former resident of Willowbrook State School, a savant named Anthony Torrone, wrote a Christian prayer book titled Anthony's Prayers that was inspired by his time and the abuse he experienced at the school.

== Media ==
In 1997, the actor Danny Aiello hosted, and Geraldo Rivera served as commentator for, a 57-minute documentary titled Unforgotten: 25 Years After Willowbrook, which revisits Willowbrook State School, "remembering the over 5,000 children who were living in the facility at the time and focusing on three former residents, to see how the effects of the institution have been felt by families and friends of patients." Stephen Holden, writing for The New York Times, said:

As graphically as it recounts the horrors of the past, Unforgotten is less concerned with raking the coals of an old scandal than with showing how the treatment of the mentally disabled has since improved. The film ... focuses on the lives of two who were once incarcerated at Willowbrook but subsequently flourished in group homes situated in close proximity to their families. It also warns that despite changes in social attitudes (the Special Olympics are cited as a shining example of progress), Willowbrook could happen again. Remembrance is a vital key to the prevention of future abuse.

== See also ==
- Developmental disability
- Human experimentation in the United States
- Summit Children's Residence Center
- The Ladd School
- William Bronston
