= Ashley Dawson =

American author, activist and professor

- Born: Cape Town, Western Cape, South Africa
- Education: University of the South; Columbia University
- Scientific career
- Fields: Cultural studies, Environmental Humanities, Postcolonial Studies
- Workplaces: City University of New York

Ashley Dawson is an author, activist, Distinguished Professor of English at the College of Staten Island and at the CUNY Graduate Center of the City University of New York. Dawson specializes in postcolonial studies, cultural studies, and environmental humanities with a particular interest in histories and discourses of migration. Since 2004, Dawson has been a contributing member of the Social Text collective. Dawson was co-editor of Social Text Online from 2010 to 2014 and, by appointment of the American Association of University Professors (AAUP), he was also editor of the Journal of Academic Freedom from 2012 to 2014. He has published and edited numerous books, and his essays have appeared in journals such as African Studies Review, Atlantic Studies, Cultural Critique, Interventions, Jouvert, New Formations, Postcolonial Studies, Postmodern Culture, Screen, Small Axe, South Atlantic Quarterly, Social Text, and Women’s Studies Quarterly.

== Life and education ==
Dawson was born in Cape Town, South Africa in 1965 to a British father and a South African mother. In 1973, his family emigrated from South Africa and relocated in Maryland, United States. After receiving a Bachelor of Arts degree in English from the University of the South in 1987, Dawson completed a master's degree in English at the University of Virginia, where he began to work on postcolonial studies. Dawson went on to earn a PhD in English at Columbia University under the tutelage of professors Rob Nixon, Anne McClintock, Jean Franco, and Edward Said.

== Work ==
After an early stint as assistant professor of English at the University of Iowa, Dawson moved to the College of Staten Island in 2001, where he remains a tenured professor of English.

Throughout his career, he has contributed scholarship in the fields of postcolonial studies, transnational, and global literature and theory, twenty-first-century and contemporary literature, among others. More recently, his writings have focused on the environmental humanities and ecocriticism.

Mongrel Nation: Diasporic Culture and the Making of Postcolonial Britain (2007)

This work surveys the history of the United Kingdom's African, Asian, and Caribbean populations from 1948 to the present, working at the juncture of cultural studies, literary criticism, and postcolonial theory. Dawson argues that during the past fifty years Asian and Black intellectuals from Sam Selvon to Zadie Smith have continually challenged the United Kingdom's exclusionary definitions of citizenship, using innovative forms of cultural expression to reconfigure definitions of belonging in the postcolonial age.

The Routledge Concise History of Twentieth-Century British Literature (2013)

In this book, part of the Routledge Concise Histories of Literature series, Dawson identifies the key British writers and texts of the twentieth-century, and outlines how they were shaped by era-defining cultural and historical events and movements from the period. Included in his analysis are a broad, diverse range of works by influential authors; an examination of the cultural and literary impact of crucial historical, social, political and cultural events; an in-depth discussion of Britain's imperial status in the century and the diversification of the nation through Black and Asian British literature; a comprehensive timeline, a glossary of terms, and an addendum of possible further readings.

Extinction: A Radical History (2016)

This book argues that the current Sixth Extinction is the product of a global attack on the planet's natural commons, the great trove of air, water, plants and creatures alongside which human beings have existed since their origin as a species. Extinction suggests that this attack has its genesis in the need for capital to expand relentlessly into all spheres of life. Dawson proposes that extinction – in its fullness and catastrophe – cannot be understood in isolation from a critique of our economic system. To achieve such a critique we need to transgress the boundaries between science, environmentalism and radical politics.

Extreme Cities: The Peril and Promise of Urban Life in the Age of Climate Change (2017)

In this work, Dawson argues that cities are ground zero for climate change, contributing the lion's share of carbon to the atmosphere, while also lying on the frontlines of rising sea levels. Today, the majority of the world's megacities are located in coastal zones, yet few of them are adequately prepared for the floods that will increasingly menace their shores. Instead, most continue to develop luxury waterfront condos for the elite and industrial facilities for corporations. These not only intensify carbon emissions, but also place coastal residents at greater risk when water levels rise. Dawson presents an alarming portrait of the future of cities, describing the efforts of Staten Island, New York, and Shishmareff, Alaska residents to relocate; Holland's models for defending against the seas; and the development of New York City before and after Hurricane Sandy.

However, the tone of the work is neither pessimistic nor prescriptive. Rather, it looks into what is already extant but made impracticable by current forms of power. The solution lies not with fortified sea walls, the book argues, but with urban movements already fighting to remake cities in a more just and equitable fashion.

People's Power: Reclaiming the Energy Commons (2020)

Dawson's latest work, published in 2020 by O/R Books, addresses the overwhelming scientific consensus: to avoid irreversible climate collapse, the burning of all fossil fuels will have to end in the next decade. People's Power sets out what is required to make this momentous shift. Simply replacing coal-fired power plants with for-profit solar energy farms, Dawson writes, will only maintain the untenable position that it is possible to sustain relentlessly expanding energy consumption. Putting forward the argument that energy needs to be de-commodified, Dawson's analysis centers around the idea of the global commons. Energy is a vital element in the great stock of air, water, plants, and cultural forms like language and art that are the inheritance of humanity as a whole.

People's Power is a critique of a market-led transition to renewable energy, addressing the history of the early development of the electric grid in the United States, telling the story of battles for public control over power during the Great Depression. This history is used to frame accounts of contemporary campaigns, in both the United States and Europe, that eschew market fundamentalism and sclerotic state power in favor of green, democratically managed, and equitably shared forms of energy.

== Publications ==
=== Books ===
==== Monographs ====
- People’s Power: Reclaiming the Energy Commons, O/R Books 2020
- Extreme Cities: The Peril and Promise of Urban Life in the Age of Climate Change, Verso 2017
- Extinction: A Radical History, O/R Books 2016
- The Routledge Concise History of Twentieth-Century British Literature, Routledge 2013
- Mongrel Nation: Diasporic Culture and the Making of Postcolonial Britain, University of Michigan Press 2007

==== Edited volumes ====
- A People's Climate Plan for New York? Climate Action Lab, Center for the Humanities, The Graduate Center, CUNY 2019
- Against Apartheid: The Case for Boycotting Israeli Universities (with Ali Abunimah, Bill V. Mullen), Haymarket Books 2015
- Imperial Ecologies (New Formations) (with Jeremy Gilbert, Wendy Wheeler), Lawrence & Wishart 2010
- Dangerous Professors: Academic Freedom and the National Security Campus (with Malini Johar Schueller), University of Michigan Press 2009
- Democracy, States, and the Struggle for Social Justice (with Heather D. Gautney, Neil Smith, Omar Dahbour), Routledge 2009
- Exceptional State: Contemporary U.S. Culture and the New Imperialism (New Americanists) (with Malini Johar Schueller), Duke University Press 2007
- Global Cities of the South (with Brent Hayes Edwards), Special Issue, Social Text 2004
