= Radiate =

Radiate may refer to:

== Biology ==
- Radiata, a taxon of jellyfish and allies
- Radiate carpal ligament, a group of fibrous bands in the hand
- Radiate ligament of head of rib
- Radiate sternocostal ligaments, fibrous bands in the sternum

== Coins ==
- Antoninianus, or "pre-reform radiate", a Roman silver coin issued in the 3rd century
- Post-reform radiate, a Roman bronze coin issued in the 4th century

== Music ==
- Radiate (album), by Tricia, 2013
- "Radiate" (Enter Shikari song), 2013
- "Radiate" (Jack Johnson song), 2013
- "Radiate", a song by Chemical Brothers from Born in the Echoes, 2015
- "Radiate", a song by Ex Hex from It's Real, 2019
- "Radiate", a song by Puddle of Mudd from Famous, 2007
- Radiate FM or WRGP, a student-run radio station of Florida International University in Miami, Florida

== Other uses ==
- Radiation, a process by which energetic particles or energetic waves travel
- Radiate (app), a mobile social networking app
- Radiate crown, headgear symbolizing the sun

== See also ==
- Radial (disambiguation)
