= McCown (disambiguation) =

McCown is a Celtic-language surname, including a list of people with the surname

McCown may refer to:

- Gaynor McCown Expeditionary Learning School, Staten Island, New York, U.S.
- Thick-billed longspur (Rhynchophanes mccownii), a small ground-feeding bird, formerly known as McCown's longspur

== See also ==
- Company B, 1st Tennessee Heavy Artillery, originally McCown Guards or the McCown Guards Artillery
