= Slicing =

Slicing may refer to:

== Computing ==
- Array slicing, an operation on an array in computer science
- Object slicing, an object-oriented programming issue
- Program slicing, a set of software engineering methods
- Slicing (interface design), image slicing for web design and interface design
- Slicing, the software operation of producing a G-code file from a 3D model file for 3D printing

== Other uses ==
- Chinese salami slicing strategy, a geopolitical strategy
- Slicing, a mechanical process; see Cutting
- Slow slicing, a Chinese form of torture and execution

== See also ==
- Slice (disambiguation)
