= Richard Veit =

American ornithologist (born 1957)

Richard R. Veit
- Born: Richard Reed Veit; June 2, 1957 (age 69); Boston, Massachusetts, U.S.
- Scientific career
- Fields: Ornithology
- Institutions: The College of Staten Island, City University of New York
- Notable students: José R. Ramírez-Garofalo
- Website: https://www.csi.cuny.edu/campus-directory/richard-veit

Richard R. Veit (born June 2, 1957) is an American ornithologist and ecologist known for his research on seabirds and their population dynamics.

== Career and research ==
His work has focused on how factors such as physical oceanography and climate change impact seabird distribution and behavior. Veit is a professor of biology at the College of Staten Island, City University of New York (CUNY), where he has been a faculty member since 1996.

Veit has been an editor of publications for the Nuttall Ornithological Club since 2002.

== Selected publications ==
=== Books ===
- Veit, R.R., & Petersen, W.R. (1993). Birds of Massachusetts. Massachusetts Audubon Society. ISBN 978-0-932691-11-8
- Nisbet, I.C.T., Veit, R.R., Auer, S.A., & White, T.P. 2013. Marine Birds of the Eastern United States and the Bay of Fundy. Nuttall Ornithological Club. ISBN 978-1-877973-48-2

=== Articles ===
- Ramírez-Garofalo, J., Curley, S.R., Ciancimino, A.V., Matarazzo, R.V. , Johnson, E.W., and R. R. Veit. 2020. The Re-establishment of Pileated Woodpeckers in New York City Following Nearly Two Centuries of Extirpation. Northeastern Naturalist 27: pages 803–816.
- Veit, R.R. and M.A. Lewis. 1996. Dispersal, population growth, and the Allee Effect: Dynamics of the House Finch Invasion of eastern North America. The American Naturalist 148: pages 255–274.
- Veit, R.R., P. Pyle.and J.A. McGowan. 1996. Ocean warming and long-term change in pelagic bird abundance within the California Current System. Marine Ecology Progress Series 139: pages 11–18.
- Veit, R.R., E.D. Silverman, and I. Everson. 1993. Aggregation patterns of pelagic predators and their principal prey, Antarctic krill, near South Georgia. Journal of Animal Ecology 62: pages 551–564.
