= Staten Island Register =

The Staten Island Register was a weekly newspaper serving the borough of Staten Island in New York City as an independent alternative to other news sources, including the Staten Island Advance. It began publication in 1966 and stopped publishing in December 2005.

== History ==
It began publication in 1966 under the ownership of the Sclafani family. Joseph was the Owner.

Started as a "shopper" (merely a vehicle for advertising with little or no editorial content) under the name Cash Register, by the early 1970s it had grown into a small but important voice for Staten Islanders. The daily Staten Island Advance, one of the original papers in the Newhouse chain, had achieved near-saturation circulation and was perceived by many as being enmeshed with political incumbents, real estate developers and other entrenched interests. The Register offered a weekly "outsider's" take on important community news: politics, government, the environment, etc.

The Staten Island Register was sold in August 2002 to Elauwit LLC, a company formed by Daniel McDonough of New Jersey. In February 2004, Elauwit sold the Register to Staten Island Media Group, LLC, run by Daniel Duman's York Street Partners, in 2004. The paper ceased publication in December 2005.

At least partial collections of the paper are available in the New York Public Library Main Branch and the New York State Library in Albany.

== Content ==
A string of editors, which included Fred Armentraut, Richard Regis, Jim Callaghan, William C. Franz, Joan Gerstel and Barbara Naness, emphasized four themes in the paper: investigative journalism, comprehensive coverage (Register articles on any particular issue often ran as series), background and analysis, and political independence. A premium was put on good explanatory pieces, and these editors made it a point of pride to avoid "dumbing down" stories. The paper also featured provocative editorials, which made it a bracing antidote to The Advance's more sedate style.

As part of its commitment to what might be called aggressive political independence, the paper almost always carried at least one, and often three or four local, exclusive political columnists, but never endorsed a candidate in its editorials. Yet, the paper was always the subject of controversy.

Register stories tended to fall into four categories: neighborhood issues that were either ignored or under-reported by other sources; environmental issues (Staten Island is an island, and the least developed of New York City's boroughs, so both marine and land use environmental issues were journalistically covered); governmental issues (since Staten Island is part of New York City and active in New York State politics, the paper made an effort to thoroughly cover the politics of city and state government as well as internal party politics in the borough); and "other" (which included everything from one of the first investigative series on the Willowbrook State School, an early story on "Joker Poker" video gambling, an exposé of labor issues on the local commuter railroad, and extensive coverage of veterans' issues).

In addition to "hard news," the paper was also well known for its extensive and in-depth articles on local history. A series on the history and operations of the New York City Fire Department in the 1980s, for instance, was packaged by the Fire Department's own press office into a sort of handbook for covering the Fire service, and long series on Staten Island's role in the Civil War and in the American Revolution won praise from local historians. Few months went by without some major historical piece in the paper during the 1980s and 1990s.
