= Radial =

Radial is a geometric term of location which may refer to:

== Mathematics and Direction ==
- Vector (geometric), a line
- Radius, adjective form of
- Radial distance (geometry), a directional coordinate in a polar coordinate system
- Radial set
- A bearing from a waypoint, such as a VHF omnidirectional range

== Biology ==
- Radial artery, the main artery of the lateral aspect of the forearm
- Radial nerve, supplies the posterior portion of the upper limb
- Radial symmetry, one of the types of distribution of body parts or shapes in biology
- Radius (bone), a bone of the forearm

== Technology ==
- Radial (radio), lines which radiate from a radio antenna
- Radial arm saw
- Radial axle, on a locomotive or carriage
- Radial compressor
- Radial delayed blowback
- Radial engine
- Radial tire
- Radial, Inc., e-commerce business

== See also ==
- Axial (disambiguation)
- Radiate (disambiguation)
