= Sunnyside, Staten Island =

Neighborhood in New York City

Sunnyside
- Neighborhood of Staten Island
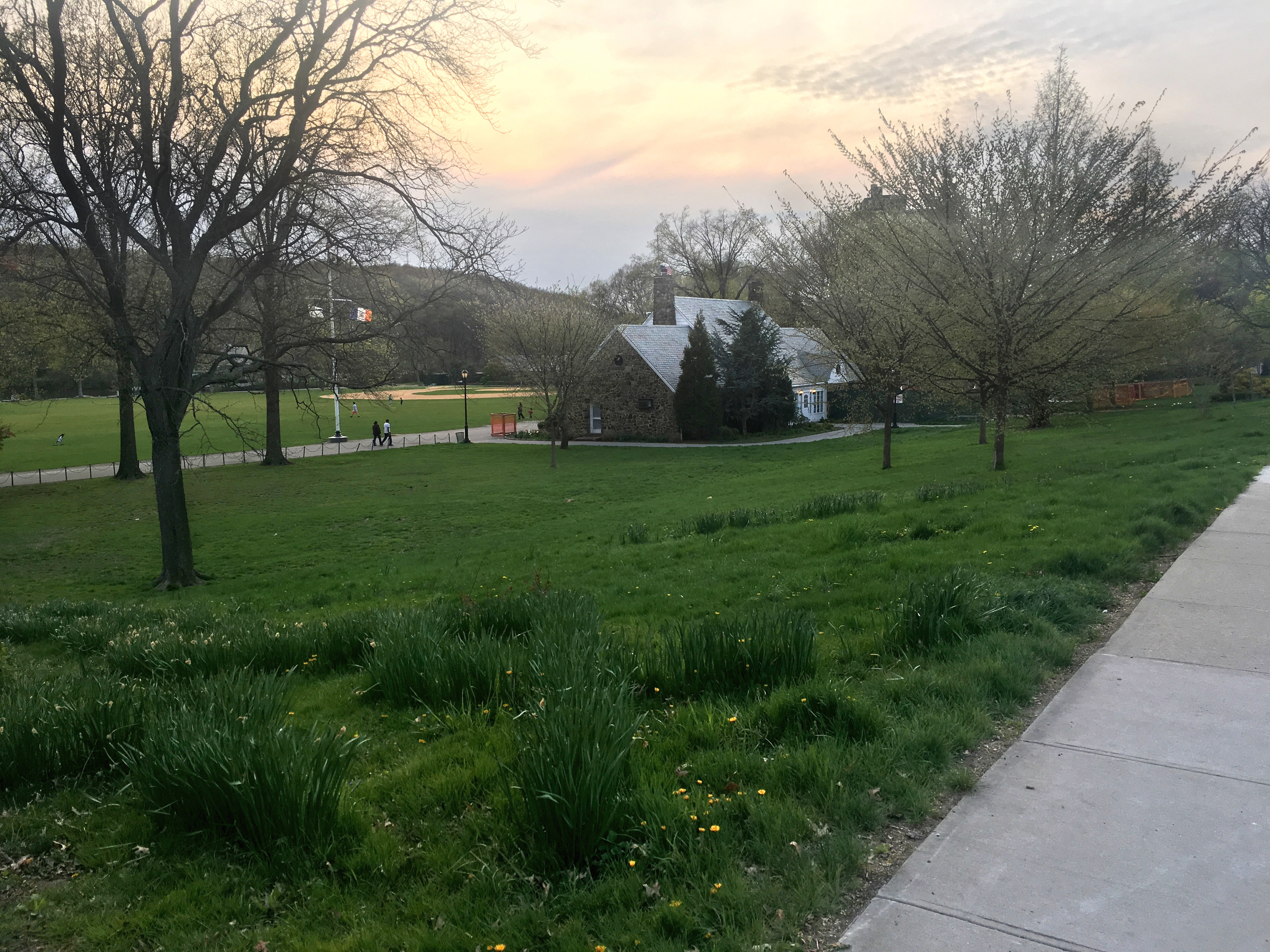
- Clove Lakes Park
- Location within New York City
- Coordinates: 40°36′47″N 74°06′14″W
- Country: United States
- State: New York
- City: New York City
- Borough: Staten Island
- ZIP Code: 10301
- Area codes: 718, 347, 929, and 917

Sunnyside is a neighborhood in the Mid-Island region of the New York City borough of Staten Island (not to be confused with the neighborhood of the same name in the borough of Queens).

== History ==
Sunnyside was originally farmland on either side of Clove Road. As farms gave way to residential housing, the Vanderbilt family built homes in the area, including two which still stand at the corner of Victory Boulevard and Clove Road. The area was once known as Clove Valley or Clovenia, and then adopted the name Sunnyside from a boarding house that was established there in 1889.

Prior to the advent of cable television service, Sunnyside was noted for having the worst television reception on Staten Island. This resulted from its being hemmed in by several hills, including Grymes Hill, Emerson Hill and Castleton Hill, the latter separating Sunnyside from neighboring Castleton Corners.

Sunnyside was once the home of a campus of the College of Staten Island, located at the foot of Emerson Hill. In 1993 this campus was moved to the grounds of the former Willowbrook State School, and an advanced-placement high school, the Michael J. Petrides School, took its place. This center is also an evacuation site for residents during floods or other emergencies.

Sunnyside Hospital was located on Little Clove Road and Ontario Avenue, but was demolished in the 1960s to make way for the Staten Island Expressway (I-278).

A large percentage of Sunnyside's residents are civil service workers, this demographic trait being typical of many Mid-Island neighborhoods.

== Parks and boundaries ==
Sunnyside is situated amid several large city parks: Clove Lakes Park and Silver Lake Park to the north, and Deere Park to the south. Slosson Avenue forms an unofficial western boundary, separating Sunnyside from Castleton Corners. Clove Road and Ocean Terrace approximate an eastern boundary, separating Sunnyside from Grymes Hill and Emerson Hill.

== Transportation ==
Sunnyside is served by the S53, S61, S62, S66, S91, S92 and S93 local buses and the SIM30 and SIM35 express buses.
