= Joanne Bland =

American voting rights activist (1953–2026)

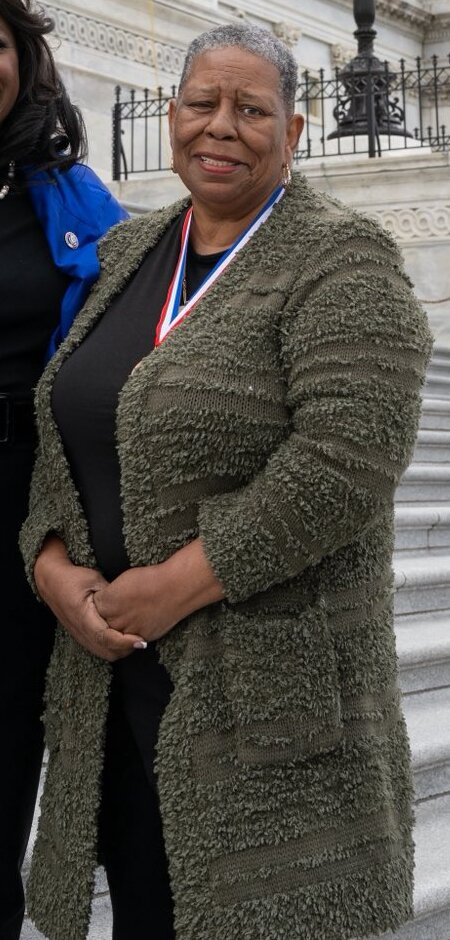
- Born: Jo Ann Blackmon; July 29, 1953; Selma, Alabama, U.S.
- Died: February 19, 2026 (aged 72); Selma, Alabama, U.S.
- Education: Staten Island College
- Known for: Civil rights activism

Joanne Blackmon Bland (sometimes spelled Jo Ann; July 29, 1953 – February 19, 2026) was an American civil rights activist. Bland was a highly active participant in the Civil Rights Movement from her earliest days, and was the youngest person to have been jailed during any civil rights demonstration during that period.

== Early life and activism ==
Jo Ann Blackmon was born in Selma, Alabama, on July 29, 1953. She grew up in segregated Selma, where she was not allowed to enter certain stores and was only allowed to go in the library and movie theater on days labeled "colored". As a result of growing up in segregation Bland lost her mother, who died in a "white" hospital waiting for a transfusion of "black blood". Her grandmother encouraged Bland and her sister to march and become a freedom fighter to fight for their freedom, even though her father disapproved due to his fear for their lives. Her father's objections did not stop Bland, who became active in the movement when she was eight years old. When she was eight years old, she attended a meeting with the Dallas County Voters League with her grandmother.

Bland began her activism in 1961, attending a freedom and voters' rights meeting presided over by Martin Luther King Jr. Bland's first time being arrested was when she was eight years old at the beginning of her activism. By the time she was 11 years old, Bland had been arrested 13 times that have been documented. The Student Nonviolent Coordinating Committee (SNCC) members active in Selma organized local teenagers to participate in the movement, including marching on "Bloody Sunday" and "Turn Around Tuesday". On "Bloody Sunday", March 7, 1965, Bland witnessed fellow activists being beaten by the police and Alabama State Troopers. During the march while Bland witnessed people being beaten; they could not get away from police as they moved in from the sides, back, and front. Bland's sister, Lynda Blackmon Lowery, was the youngest person that participated in the march; she was 14 years old at that time. Lowery saw people putting Bland in the back of a white car and she thought her sister was dead, but when she got to the car, she soon realized that Bland just fainted. When Bland woke up, she could feel her sister's blood dripping on her face from being hit on the head many times. Bland helped protect white Northerners who chose to participant in the march; they included ministers and college students. On March 21, 1965, she marched from Selma to Montgomery and that same year in August the Voting Rights Act was signed. Bland was one of seven black students who integrated A. G. Parish High School in Alabama.

== Career ==
Bland remained active in several local and regional organizations, including the Southern Christian Leadership Conference, the NAACP, the Sunflower Project, Ladies With A Mission, and her church, Ward Chapel in Prattville, Alabama. She spoke at conferences and workshops for the Smithsonian Institution in Washington, DC, and in the states of Maine, Wisconsin, Vermont, Minnesota, Nebraska, Georgia, Pennsylvania, Texas, South Carolina, and throughout Alabama. She was an original board member, and even at times described as a co-founder, of the National Voting Rights Museum in Selma, Alabama and became its tour director in 1992.

She served in the United States Army and was a graduate of the College of Staten Island, where she received a Bachelor of Arts degree. She was a co-founder of the Voting Rights Museum located across the Edmund Pettus Bridge, but she left the museum in 2007. After leaving the museum Bland created Journeys for the Soul, located in Alabama, Bland took individuals of all age groups on a journey to the past. Through educational tours and lectures, she taught the history of the Civil Rights Movement and the struggle to achieve voting rights. In 2005, Bland and Rev. C. T. Vivian headlined a conference commemorating the 40th anniversary of the Voting Rights Act of 1965 at the University of Nebraska-Lincoln. Bland received the Robert O. Cooper Peace and Justice Fellowship on April 10, 2014, at an event hosted by SMU. She used her platform to promote the importance of voting and being an active participant in elections. As an activist, Bland made it her mission to teach the future generation about the segregated past. Bland was a keynote speaker at the celebration of Martin Luther King Jr. at UW-Eau Claire, February 2019.

In 2021, Bland, along with Kimberly Smitherman, founded Foot Soldiers Park and Education Center in Selma, Alabama.

== Later life and death ==
Bland was featured in the 2019 documentary on voter suppression, After Selma, directed by Loki Mulholland, where she described her childhood, activism, and the ongoing struggle for equal voting rights in the United States.

Bland died from lung cancer in Selma, Alabama, on February 19, 2026, at the age of 72. A celebration of life service was held for Bland at Carl Morgan Convention Center in Selma on March 4, 2026, followed by a crossing of the Edmund Pettus Bridge in her honor.
