= Anthony Torrone =

American author (born 1955)

Anthony Torrone (born March 10, 1955) is an American Christian author who has a developmental disability. Torrone's 2011 book Anthony's Prayers was inspired by his time at, and the abuse that he experienced as a resident of, the former Willowbrook State School, a New York State mental hospital for children. Torrone has been a resident of Grand Rapids, Michigan, since the 1970s.
