= College of Staten Island High School for International Studies =

Public school in New York City

Location
- 100 Essex Drive; Staten Island, New York; United States
- Coordinates: 40°34′53″N 74°09′29″W

Information
- Type: Public
- Established: 2005
- School board: New York City Public Schools
- School number: 047
- CEEB code: 335346
- Principal: Joseph Canale Assistant Principal = Lauren Torres, Theresa Desanti
- Faculty: 31
- Grades: 9–12
- Enrollment: 520
- Colors: Black and teal
- Mascot: Dragon
- Nickname: Dragons
- Website: www.csihighschool.org

College of Staten Island High School For International Studies (CSIHSIS) is a New York City public high school that incorporates an internationally themed curriculum as well as preparing students for the 21st Century. CSIHSIS originally opened as a Region 7 public high school in 2005 on the College of Staten Island campus and moved to a new building in September 2008 located in New Springville, Staten Island. It was founded through a partnership with The College of Staten Island and Asia Society, with financial support by the Bill & Melinda Gates Foundation ($100,000 a year for the first four years).

The school is currently operating at full capacity and recently graduated its first class of 93 seniors. Students were accepted to colleges throughout the country including University of Chicago, Duke University, Georgetown University, Northeastern University, Iona University, Stony Brook University, Brown University, SUNY Oneonta, McGill University, CUNY Hunter, CUNY Baruch, McCauley Honors College at College of Staten Island, Rutgers University, New York University, Brooklyn College, SUNY Geneseo, Life University School of Chiropractic, Howard University, Penn State, and Indiana University.

The school is meant to be a small school under the "small-schools model" the Bloomberg administration has implemented elsewhere in New York City, and it had about 200 students in the 2006–2007 academic year.

== Facility ==
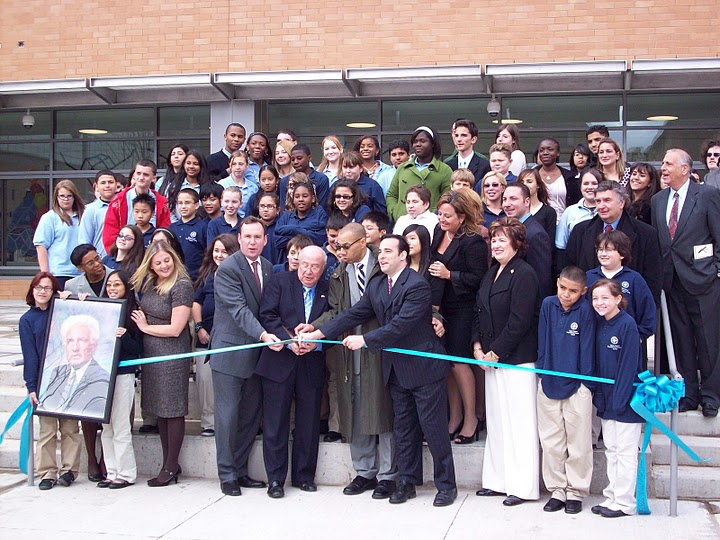
Jerome Parker Campus during its opening ceremony in September 2009.

After CSIHSIS moved from its original location on the College of Staten Island campus, it moved into the Jerome Parker Campus on Staten Island. This new, state-of-the-art building was also shared with Gaynor McCown Expeditionary Learning School, Marsh Avenue Expeditionary Learning School, and The Hungerford School.

=== Floor layout ===
1. Library, gym, auditorium, and main entrance. (Shared floor with other schools on campus)
2. Math Department and some Language and History Classrooms. There is also the main office, well as two auxiliary gyms, as well as the guidance suite (Parent Coordinator, Assistant Principal, Guidance Counselor, SAPIS)
3. English and History Departments
4. Science and some language classrooms

There is also Floor 0, which is the shared lunchroom as well as the outside promenade.

== Administration ==
The school's first principal, Aimee Horowitz, left a career as an attorney in California in the 1990s to become a school teacher in New York City. In 1999, she became assistant principal of social studies at Edward R. Murrow High School in Brooklyn before taking the job as the founding principal of CSIHSIS. After she left to become Superintendent of High Schools New York City DOE in 2010, Joseph Canale, the previous assistant principal, replaced Horowitz while Lauren Torres became the assistant principal.

In 2025, Theresa Desanti became the second principal of CSI High School.

== Parent Association ==
The school Parent Teacher Association sponsors several annual fundraisers, works with teachers and students to sponsor school-wide events. The PTA also works with teachers and the school administration to see the needs of the students and parents. The PTA also co-sponsors the Morty Horowitz College Scholarship created in memory of Principal Aimee Horowitz's father.

== Student body ==
Students must apply through the New York City High School application process to be accepted at the school. However, to receive priority in admission, students must demonstrate interest and make an informed choice by attending one of the school's open house events. Although the student body is mostly from Staten Island, College of Staten Island High School also attracts students from Districts 20 and 21 in Brooklyn.

=== Early application problems ===
During the school's initial 2005–2006 academic year, "despite a requirement for interested eighth-graders to resubmit the high school applications they had turned in months earlier — causing some to risk forfeiting seats at elite schools — 213 students vied for the spots at the School for International Studies," according to The Staten Island Advance.

== Academics ==
CSIHSIS students are expected to follow a rigorous, globally based curriculum throughout their entire experience at high school. This also allows students to take different course that are scarcely available throughout the NYCDOE system, such as Global Technology and International Journalism. Students are also expected to study a second language for a full four years. Languages currently offered are Spanish and Mandarin. While studying a second language, students also have the opportunity for international travel, and can take extra student exchange trips as well. During the summer of 2006, two students traveled to China through scholarships from the China Institute. Two Students also participated in a travel study tour to China through a grant from the Asia Society the following year. On this trip, students accelerated and expanded their study of Mandarin through real-world experience, helped to build houses for some of China's less fortunate, and traveled throughout China. Students have also had the option to travel to various countries including Italy, England, France and Spain. During 2008–2009 school year, students learning Japanese traveled to Japan where they visited a school, participated in a home stay and traveled throughout the country.

Special academic programs include AP US History; AP Studio Art, AP Biology, AP Calculus, AP English, International Journalism, Forensics, Statistics, Global Finance, a Percussion Ensemble, a Model United Nations Program, College Now; Architecture, Construction & Engineering Program; an after school Homework Center and a three-week Freshman Summer Academy.

== External partnerships ==
Along with partnerships with the Asia Society and College of Staten Island, as a recipient of a Gates Grant, the school has partnerships with external organizations such as:

- UN/USA
- iEARN
- Net Aid
- Kiwanis Club
- World Savvy
- The JCC (Jewish Community Center)
- The Architecture, Construction & Engineering Program
- The Brooklyn Home for Aged Men
- St. John's University
- Asia Society International Studies Schools Network
- Palazzo Strozzi Foundation
- City University of New York system (College of Staten Island)

== Extracurricular activities ==
The school has these clubs and activities for students:

- LION (Love Is Our Niche)
- My Brothers Keepers/My Sisters Keepers (MBK/MSK)
- Fashion Club
- Video Game Club
- Jewelry Club
- Theater Club
- Politics Club
- Muslim Club
- Christian Club
- Art Club
- Volleyball
- Student government/Parliament
- Public School Athletic League (PSAL) sports including soccer, basketball, and wrestling
- Tutoring
- Boys & Girls Varsity Basketball
- Boys & Girls Soccer
- Girls Volleyball
- Girls' flag football
- Fencing
- Awareness Club

== Athletics ==
In the 2007–2008 academic year, the school fielded junior varsity teams in boys' and girls' basketball, both classified as developmental by the Public School Athletic League, and girls' softball. During the 2008–2009 school year the girls Varsity Softball Team, only in its second year of existence, made it to the playoffs.

CSI High School currently has 8 active PSAL rated teams, with one more currently in developmental stage. The active teams include Boys Varsity Basketball, Girls Varsity Basketball, Boys Cross Country Track, Girls Cross Country Track, Boys Indoor Track, Girls Indoor Track, Boys Varsity Track and Girls Varsity Track, Girls Varsity Softball. The single developmental team is Boys Varsity Wrestling. The school also offers varsity tennis for boys and girls.
