= Charles Liu =

Taiwanese-born American astrophysicist (born 1968)

- 劉俊初
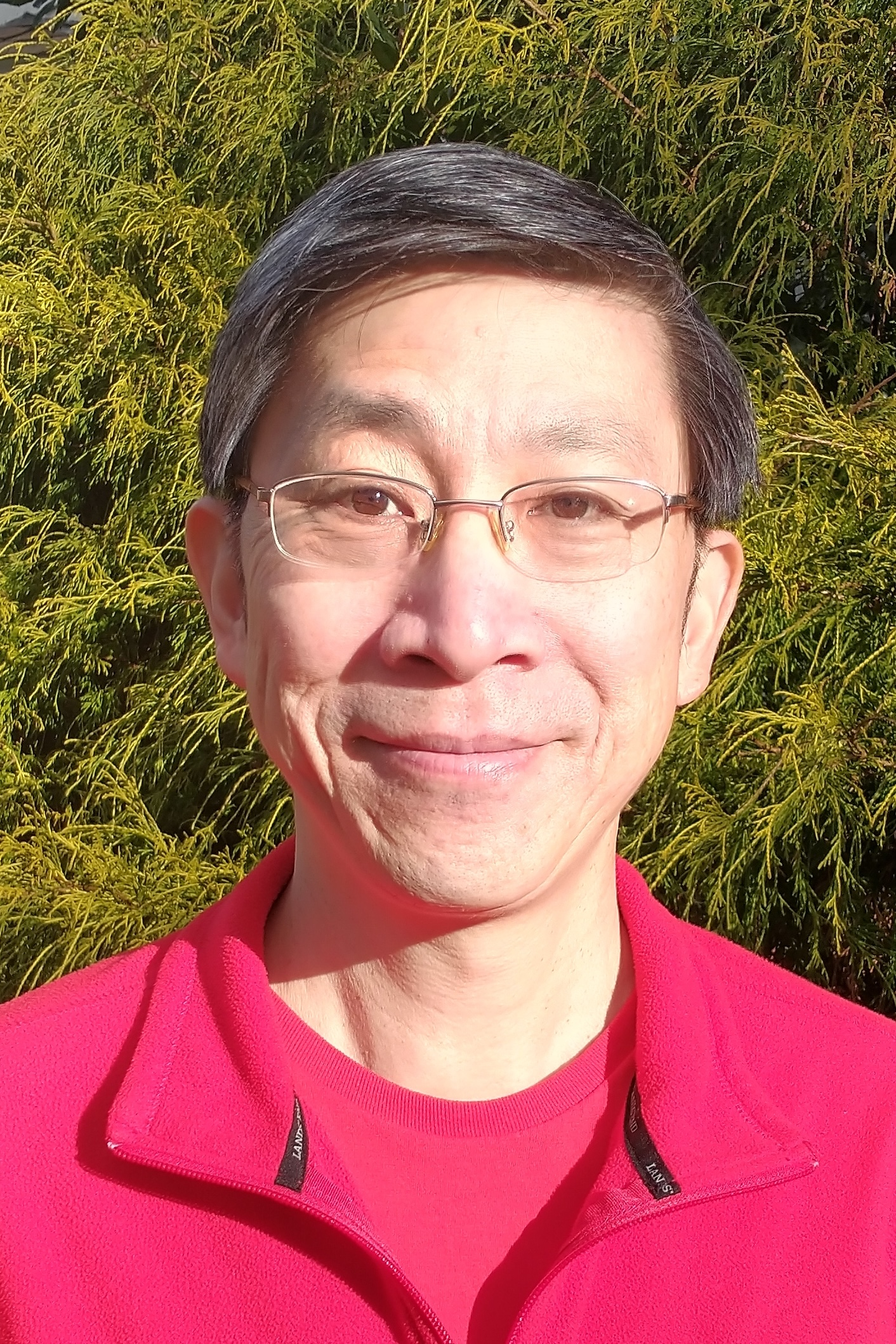
- Liu in 2023
- Born: Liu Tsun-chu (劉俊初); 1968 (age 57–58); Taipei, Taiwan
- Citizenship: United States
- Education: Harvard University (AB); University of Arizona (PhD)
- Occupation: Astronomer
- Spouse: Amy Rabb-Liu (m. 1991)
- Children: 3
- Parents: Fu-wen (Frank) Liu (father); Jui-chi (Janice) Liu (mother)
- Awards: AAS Legacy Fellow, 2020; AAS Education Prize, 2024
- Scientific career
- Fields: Astronomy; physics
- Workplaces: The College of Staten Island and the Graduate Center of the City University of New York
- Website: https://www.youtube.com/@theliuniverse

Charles Tsun-chu Liu (simplified Chinese: 刘俊初; traditional Chinese: 劉俊初; pinyin: Liú Jùn-chū; born 1968) is a Taiwanese-born American astronomer and astronomy educator. His research interests include merging and colliding galaxies, active galactic nuclei (AGN), and the star formation history of the universe. He is a former director of the William E. Macaulay Honors College and The Verrazzano School at the City University of New York's College of Staten Island.

He currently serves as a professor of physics and astronomy at the College of Staten Island, and as President of the Astronomical Society of New York. Liu is the 2024 recipient of the American Astronomical Society's (AAS) Education Prize, and was named an AAS Legacy Fellow in 2020.

== Early life ==
Liu was born in Taipei, Taiwan to Fu-wen (Frank) Liu, a professor of pomology and horticulture, and Jui-chi (Janice) Liu, a nurse of obstetrics and midwifery, both of Dahu Township, Miaoli County, Taiwan. He is the second of three children; his older sister, Grace, is a retired banker, and his younger brother, Henry, is a family physician. His family immigrated to the United States when Liu was four years old, and all of them were naturalized as U.S. citizens in 1980. He attended Harvard University, graduating with a bachelor’s degree in astronomy and astrophysics and physics, and the University of Arizona, graduating with a Ph.D. in astronomy. He then held postdoctoral positions at Kitt Peak National Observatory and Columbia University, where he conducted research on galaxy evolution and the star formation history of the universe.

== Career ==
In 1998, Liu joined the scientific staff of the Hayden Planetarium at the American Museum of Natural History, where he helped design and develop the exhibitry and scientific content of the Rose Center for Earth and Space. During this time, with co-authors Neil deGrasse Tyson and Robert W. Irion, Liu wrote "One Universe: At Home In The Cosmos (2000)", for which Tyson, Irion, and Liu were awarded the 2001 Science Writing Award (scientist category) of the American Institute of Physics.

In 2003, Liu joined the faculty of the CUNY College of Staten Island (CSI). He was subsequently appointed to the consortial faculty of the physics doctoral program of the CUNY Graduate Center. In 2008, Liu became director of The Verrazzano School Honors Program at CSI. In 2012, he also became director of the William E. Macaulay Honors College at CSI. He served as director of both of those programs until 2018.

In 2015, Liu was elected as Education Officer of the American Astronomical Society, serving also as a Councilor and Trustee of the Society until 2018. He was elected as President of the Astronomical Society of New York in 2016, and was named a Legacy Fellow of the American Astronomical Society in 2020.

Liu was awarded the AAS Education Prize in 2024, which celebrated “his national and international impact as an enthusiastic astronomy educator throughout his career — including his contributions to informal education via his work at the American Museum of Natural History, his numerous popular science books, and his podcast ‘The LIUniverse’; as well as his contributions to formal education as a professor and mentor. The award also recognizes his service to the astronomy education community as AAS Education Officer and inaugural Chair of the AAS Education Committee.”

=== Research ===
Liu is one of the original team members of the Cosmic Evolution Survey (COSMOS), the largest contiguous deep field ever observed with the Hubble Space Telescope. His work on that project has focused on faint, strongly star-forming galaxies. In 2015, he also joined the Mapping Nearby Galaxies at APO (MaNGA) project of the Sloan Digital Sky Survey, where he has been studying galaxies whose star formation activity has been quenched within approximately the past one billion years.

Since 2016, Liu has served on the Vera C. Rubin Observatory Science Advisory Committee, where he is involved with galaxy evolution research.

== Personal life ==
Liu has been married to the mathematician and educator Dr. Amy Rabb-Liu since 1991. They have three children.

== Selected bibliography ==
2000: One Universe: at Home in the Cosmos (with Neil DeGrasse Tyson and Robert Irion)

2008: The Handy Astronomy Answer Book

2013: The Handy Astronomy Answer Book, Third Edition

2019: StarTalk Everything You Ever Need to Know About Space Travel, Sci-Fi, the Human Race, the Universe, and Beyond

2019: 30-second universe: 50 most significant ideas, theories and events that sum up... everything

2020: The Handy Physics Answer Book

2021: 30-Second Space Travel: 50 key ideas, inventions, and destinations that have inspired humanity toward the heavens

2021: Intro to Physics for Babies

2022: The Cosmos Explained: A history of the universe from its beginning to today and beyond

2024: The Handy Quantum Physics Answer Book

2026: (Super) Natural Science: The Real Science of Superheroes, Mythic Creatures, and the (Sci-Fi) Universe
