= Patricia J. Brooks =

American developmental psychologist

Patricia J. Brooks (born July 16, 1965) is an American developmental psychologist. She is the director of the Language Learning Laboratory at the College of Staten Island of City University of New York and Doctoral Faculty at the CUNY Graduate Center where she serves as the Deputy Executive Officer of the PhD program in Psychology. Brooks is also the faculty advisor of the Graduate Student Teaching Association (GSTA) of Division 2 of the American Psychological Association, the Society for the Teaching of Psychology (STP).

== Early life and education ==
Brooks received her undergraduate degree from Johns Hopkins University where she worked on clinical research with aphasic patients. She received her PhD in Experimental Psychology in 1993 from New York University in language development and social-cognitive development under the supervision of Martin Braine. She completed two postdoctoral fellowships, one at Carnegie Mellon University, under Brian MacWhinney, from 1993 to 1995, where she began research on spoken word production in children with and without language impairments and another at Emory University, under Michael Tomasello, from 1995 to 1997 where she focused on early syntactic development and overgeneralization in children's sentence production.

== Career ==
In 1997, Brooks joined the faculty of the College of Staten Island and in 1998 she joined the faculty at the CUNY Graduate Center.

Brooks serves as the Deputy Executive Officer of the PhD Program in Psychology (Area: Pedagogy), and she is a Faculty Advisor of the Graduate Student Teaching Association of the American Psychological Association. Brooks maintains an active line of research where she publishes on language learning in typical and atypical child development and autism spectrum disorders.

== Research ==
Brooks's dissertation work demonstrated that children between 5–10 years of age struggle to correctly apply universal quantifiers such as "all" and "each". Her research interests center around two broad areas (1) examining individual differences in language development and learning, and (2) research on pedagogy and effective learning.

Brooks conducts research on first - and second language learning. She uses a variety of methodologies including experiments, parent-child conversational analysis, and meta-analysis to explore developmental processes throughout the lifespan in language acquisition and pedagogy. Her contributions to the field of language development include studies on the acquisition of inflectional morphology, quantifiers and verb frames.

Brooks has co-authored over 90 scientific papers and book chapters. She has also co-authored a textbook on Language Development, and co-edited the Encyclopedia of Language Development.

== Awards ==
- 2016, Faculty Service Award, City University of New York

== Selected bibliography ==
=== Books ===
- Brooks, P. J., & Kempe, V. (Eds.) (2014). Encyclopedia of Language Development. Thousand Oaks, CA: Sage Publications.
- Brooks, P. J., & Kempe, V. (2012). Language Development. West Sussex, UK: Wiley Blackwell.

=== Articles and Chapters ===
- Aldrich, N. J., & Brooks, P. J. (2016). Linguistic and socio-cognitive predictors of school-age children's narrative evaluations about jealousy. First Language, doi: 10.1177/0142723716679797
- Alfieri, L., Brooks, P. J., Aldrich, N. J., & Tenenbaum, H. R. (2011). Does discovery-based instruction enhance learning? Journal of Educational Psychology, 103(1), 1.
- Brooks, P. J., & Braine, M. D. (1996). What do children know about the universal quantifiers all and each? Cognition, 60(3), pages 235–268.
- Brooks, P.J., & Ploog, B. (2013). Attention to emotional tone of voice in speech perception in children with autism. Research in Autism Spectrum Disorders, 7(7), pages 845–857.
- Brooks, P.J., Seiger-Gardner, L. & Sailor, K. (2012). Contrasting effects of associates and coordinates in children with and without language impairment: A picture-word interference study. Applied Psycholinguistics, 35(3), pages 515–545.
- Brooks, P. J., & Tomasello, M. (1999). How children constrain their argument structure constructions. Language, 74(4), pages 720–738.
- Kempe, V., Brooks, P. J., & Kharkhurin, A. (2010). Cognitive predictors of generalization of Russian grammatical gender categories. Language Learning, 60(1), pages 127–153.
- Moore, B., Brooks, P. J., & Rabin, L. (2014). Developments in diachronic thinking and event ordering in 5- to 10-year-old children. International Journal of Behavioral Development, 38(3). doi: 10.1177/0165025414520806
- Ploog, B. O., Scharf, A., Nelson, D., & Brooks, P. J. (2013). Use of computer-assisted technologies (CAT) to enhance social, communicative, and language development in children with autism spectrum disorders. Journal of Autism and Developmental Disorders, 43(2), pages 301–322.
- Powers, K., Brooks, P. J., Aldrich, N. J., Palladino, M. & Alfieri, L. (2013). Effects of video-game play on information processing: A meta-analytic investigation. Psychonomic Bulletin and Review, 20(6), pages 1055–1079. doi:10.3758/s13423-013-0418-z
- Sailor, K. & Brooks, P. J. (2014). Do part-whole relations produce facilitation in the picture-word interference task? Quarterly Journal of Experimental Psychology, 67(9), pages 1768–1785.
- Tomasello, M., & Brooks, P. J. (1999). Early syntactic development: A construction grammar approach. In M. Barrett, The Development of Language (161-190). New York: Psychology Press.
