= Clove Lakes Park =

Public park in Staten Island, New York

Coordinates: 40°37′10″N 74°06′50″W

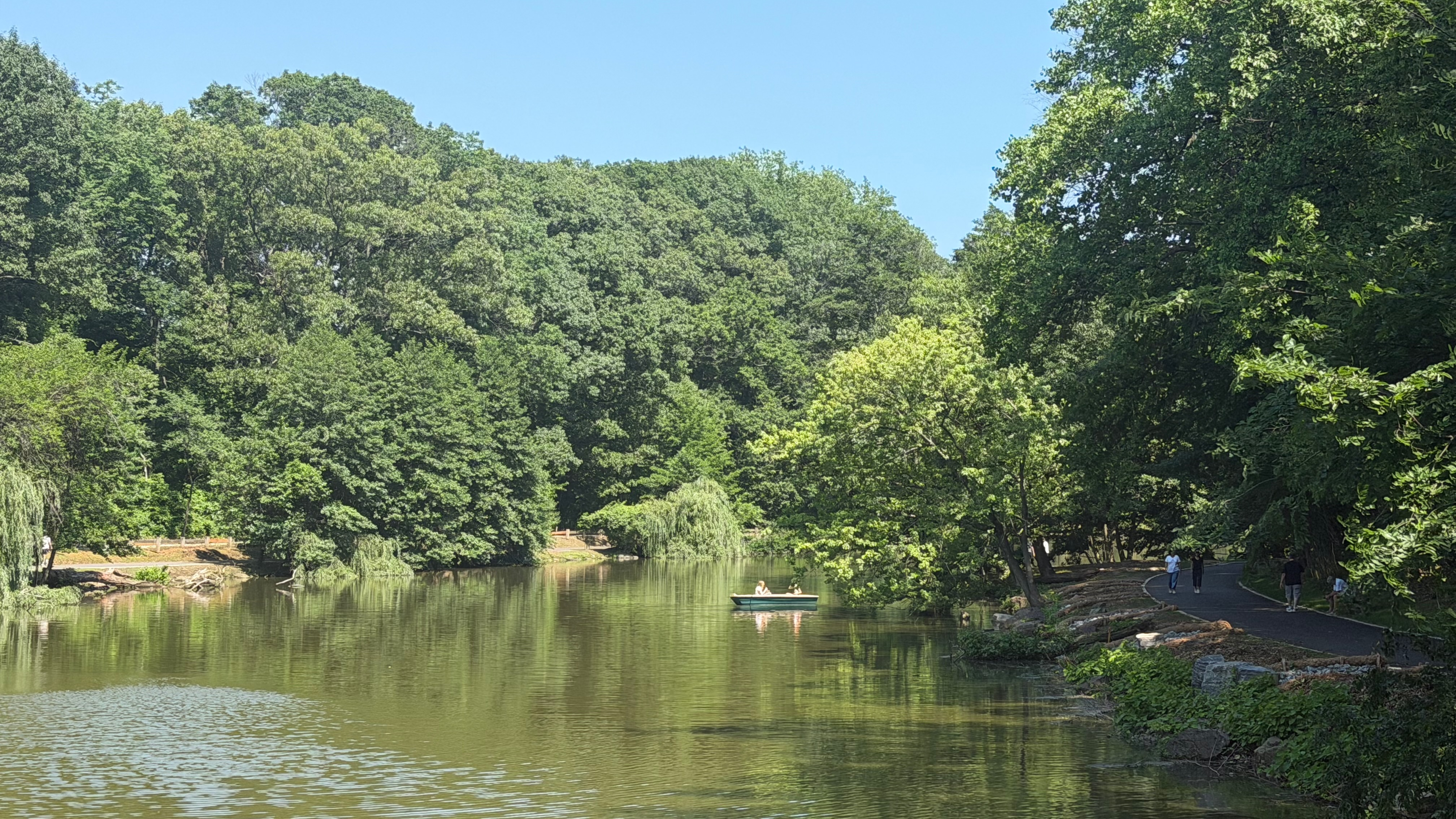
Clove Lakes Park

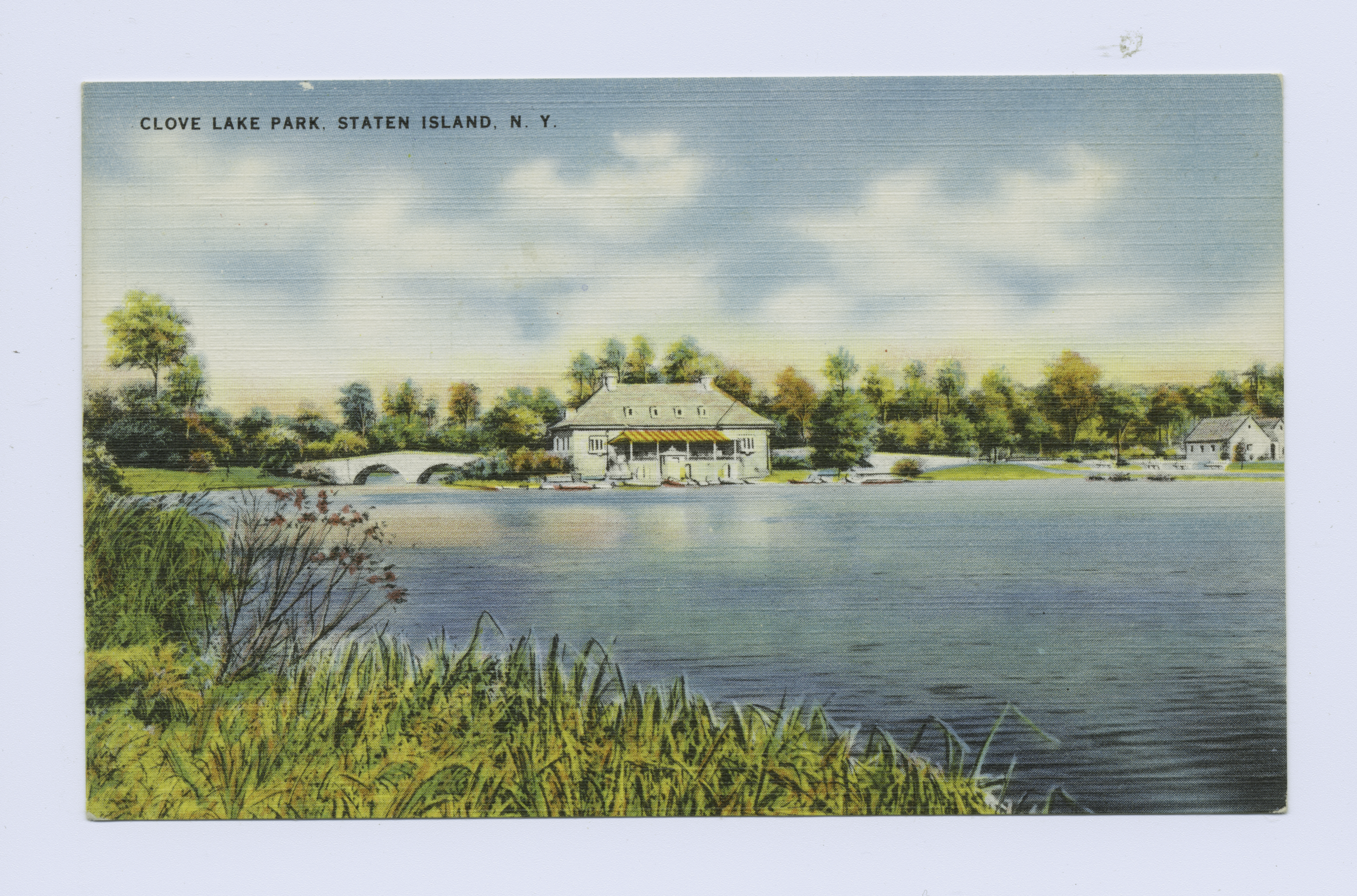
Lake and restaurant, early 20th century postcard

Clove Lakes Park is a public park in the Sunnyside neighborhood of Staten Island in New York City.

Clove Lakes Park has a rich natural history with valuable ecological assets and a few remnants of the past. Chief among them are the park's lakes and ponds, outcroppings of serpentine rocks, and Staten Island's largest living thing, a 119-foot-tall (36 m) tulip tree. Clove Lakes Park is home to many species of indigenous wildlife. Visitors can see fish such as black crappie, brown bullhead, bluegill, emerald shiner, pumpkinseed, largemouth bass, and carp; birds such as red-tailed hawk, belted kingfisher, double-crested cormorant, red-winged blackbird, Canada goose, heron, egret and mallard; as well as reptiles and amphibians, like the common snapping turtle, eastern painted turtle, red-eared slider, and occasionally even the red-backed salamander. The park is also home to mammals such as eastern gray squirrel, muskrat, eastern cottontail, and eastern chipmunk.

The park is known for its cozy picnic accommodations and boating. Besides strolling down trails and paddling on its bodies of water, visitors can experience the park as a more modern recreation zone. Several baseball diamonds, a soccer field, basketball court, playgrounds, and a football field dot the park's landscape. The Staten Island World War II Veteran's Memorial Ice Skating Rink is an outdoor rink located in what could be called the "active" part of the park, close to its other fields and courts. The park also contains a restaurant overlooking Clove Lake, and the borough headquarters of the city's Department of Parks and Recreation.

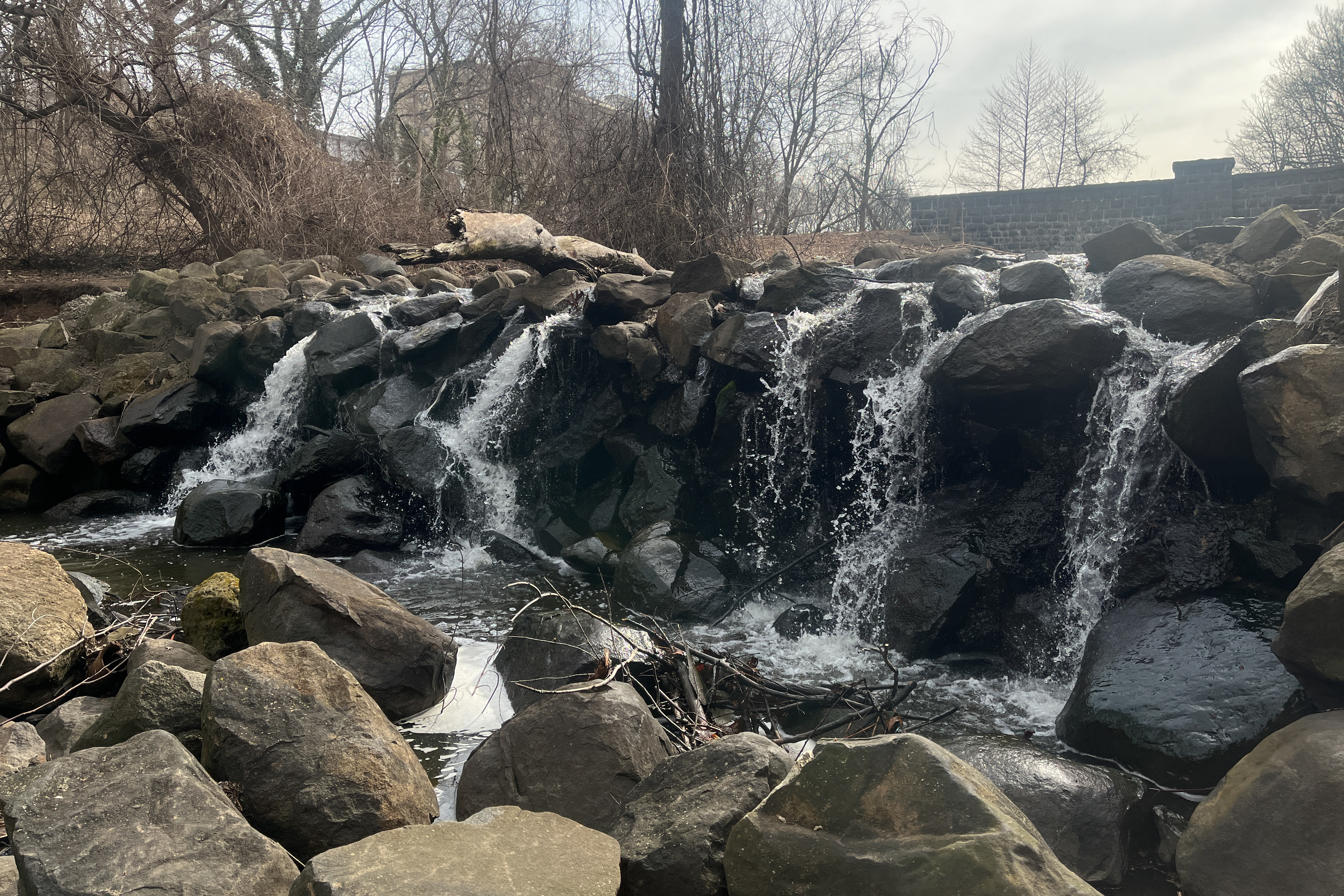
Small waterfall at Clove Lake, March 2026.

The park consists of three lakes: the main one is Clove Lake, which runs off to Martling Lake, and then to Brooks Lake.

The Staten Island Expressway, part of Interstate 278, built in 1964, goes through a cleft just south of the park, connecting the then newly built Verrazzano–Narrows Bridge in the east with the Goethals Bridge in the west. When first proposed, the expressway was to be named the Clove Lake Expressway.
