= Slice (app) =

Online food ordering platform for independent pizzerias

- Type: Private
- Founded: 2010
- Founder: Ilir Sela
- Headquarters: New York City
- Area served: United States
- Website: slice.com

Slice is an American online food ordering platform for independent pizzerias. It allows pizzeria owners to offer their products to their customers using a mobile-optimized website and their customers can place orders through the Slice app and social media channels. The company claims their platform is used by 9,000 pizzerias in 2,500 towns and cities in the US. It also claims to have processed more than $100 million worth of deliveries in 2017 and to have filled a total of over 12 million orders since 2010.

== History ==
Slice was founded in 2010 by Ilir Sela and was originally called MyPizza. In July 2016, Slice closed on a $3 million Series A funding round. In May 2017, it raised $15 million led by GGV Capital. In 2020, Slice got more attention due to the COVID-19 pandemic forcing restaurants to shut down and focus on delivery and take out.

== See also ==
- Radiate
