= Drug Cartels Do Not Exist =

2022 non-fiction book by Oswaldo Zavala

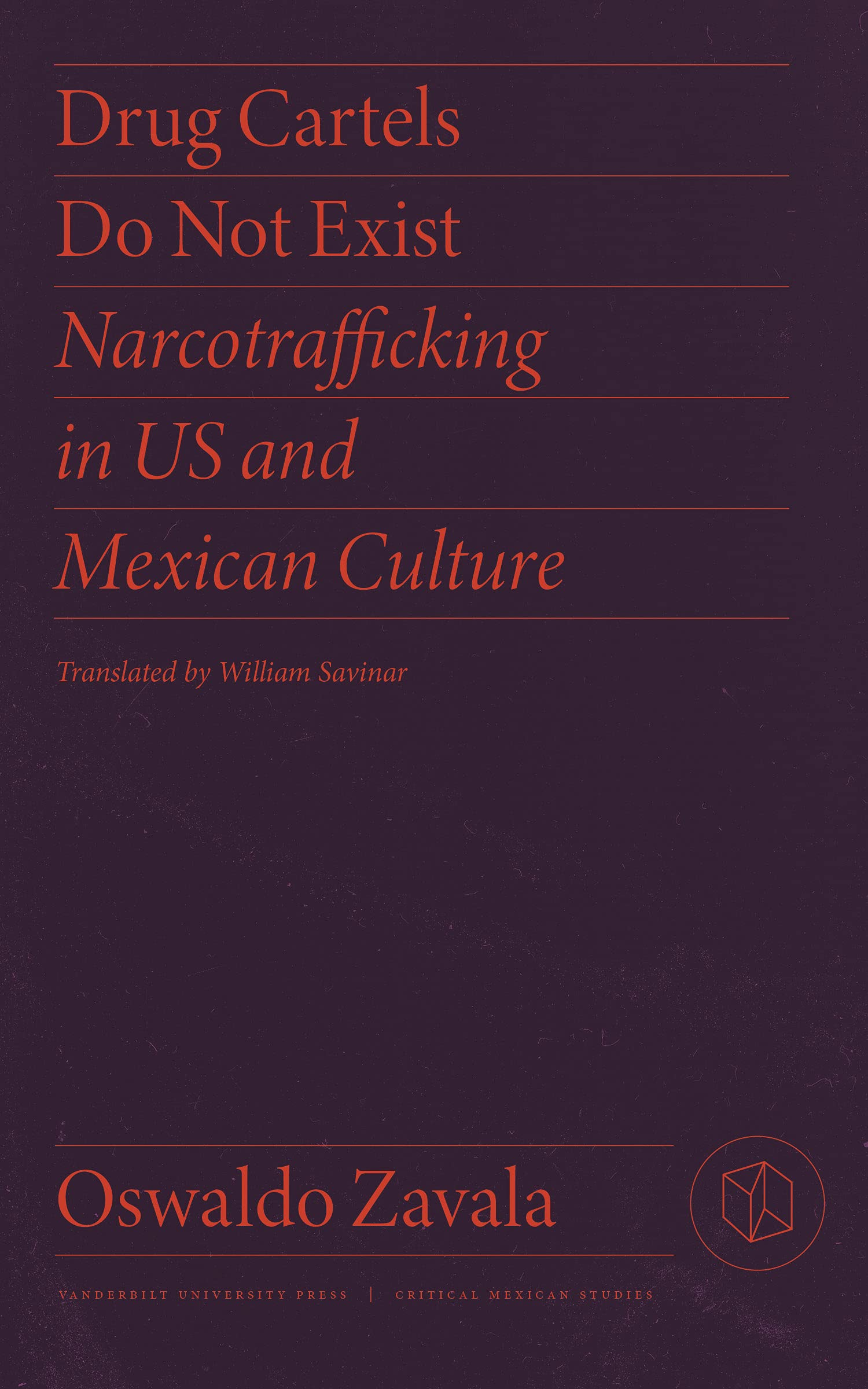
- Author: Oswaldo Zavala
- Original title: Los cárteles no existen. Narcotráfico y cultura en México
- Translator: William Savinar
- Subjects: Mexican drug war, Military–industrial complex
- Genre: Non-fiction
- Publisher: Vanderbilt University Press
- Publication date: May 15, 2022
- Pages: 193
- ISBN: 978-0826504678

Drug Cartels Do Not Exist: Narcotrafficking in US and Mexican Culture is a 2022 non-fiction book by Oswaldo Zavala. The book is an analysis of the nature of US and Mexican cultural narratives regarding the narcotics trade.

== Publication ==
The book was written by Oswaldo Zavala, a Mexican journalist and a professor of Latin American Literature and Culture at the City University of New York. It was first published by Malpaso in 2018 as Los cárteles no existen. Narcotráfico y cultura en México. William Savinar's English translation was published in 2022 by Vanderbilt University Press.

== Synopsis ==
Focusing on the end of the PRI dictatorship in the late 1990s and the contemporary era, Zavala claims that much of the narrative around narcotics trafficking is based solely in the claims of the US and Mexican governments and various cultural depictions, with little connection to the trade as it exists. Media organizations in both countries have reinforced this by uncritically promoting state narratives regarding the narcotics trade, creating a hegemonic national security myth he calls "That phantom crime ideology". He further argues that academia and journalism in both countries have failed to effectively interrogate the official narratives of both countries, uncritically privileging official sources and beliefs about the narcotics trade despite little supporting evidence. According to Zavala, mainstream institutions have also persistently chosen to ignore and/or belittle local journalists who do effectively critique this, comparing this to the plight of Gary Webb after the publication of his Dark Alliance series.

Analyzing the historical development of the relationship between the narcotics trade and the Mexican and US governments, Zavala also highlights writers and journalists that have contested state narratives on narcotics, which he describes as counterweights to this hegemonic national security narrative. He also describes several high-profile events, such as the capture of El Chapo in 2016, and points out how the actions of both countries undermine the alleged threat posed by drug traffickers, while local journalism has repeatedly displayed that most violence seen in the Mexican drug war is committed by Mexican security forces. Zavala ultimately directly pins much of the violence observed during the Mexican drug war on Mexican security forces and the militarization justified by these national security narratives.

== Critical reception ==
Osiris Aníbal Gómez of the University of Minnesota described the book as "a defiant investigation", "a rigorous research effort" and "an act of hope."
