= Craig Hart Neilsen =

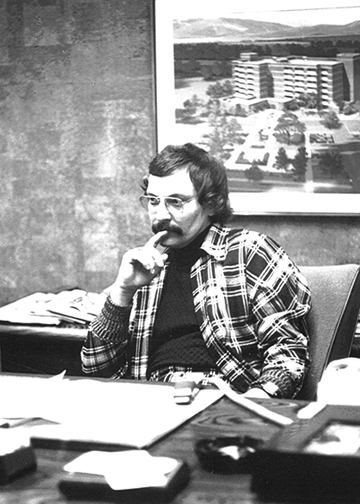

Craig Hart Neilsen (August 31, 1941 in Logan, Utah — November 19, 2006 in Las Vegas, Nevada) was an American gaming industry executive who founded Ameristar Casinos, Inc. and formed the Craig H. Neilsen Foundation to fund scientific research and quality of life programs for people living with spinal cord injuries.

== Early life, Career and Spinal Cord Injury ==
Craig Hart Neilsen was an American entrepreneur, gaming industry executive, and philanthropist. Neilsen was born in Logan, Utah, to Ray and Gwen Neilsen. The family later moved to Twin Falls, Idaho, where Neilsen graduated from high school in 1959. After receiving a degree in political science from Utah State University, Neilsen enrolled at the University of Utah where he earned a Master's in Business Administration in 1964 and a law degree in 1967. After law school, he moved back to Twin Falls and initially practiced law for the firm Parry, Robertson & Daley.

In 1963, he married Joy Seiter in Salt Lake City. They had one child, Ray Hart Neilsen, born in Salt Lake City on March 9, 1964. The couple divorced in 1976 and in 1977 he married Nickola J. Miller, but they divorced in 1981.

In 1967, Neilsen started working for his father's company, Neilsen Miller Construction Co., a Twin Falls construction and development company that also had a one-fourth interest in Cactus Pete's Casino.

Cactus Pete's casino began as a gas station without electricity or phone service but was home to popular slot machines. Peter V. "Cactus Pete" Piersanti had a small gaming business in Island Park, Idaho. When Idaho banned gambling in 1953, Piersanti relocated his machines across the border in Nevada. Two years later, Cactus Pete's, located in what would become Jackpot, Nevada, hired Neilsen Miller Construction to build the Desert Lodge, a 15-room motel. In 1967, Craig's father, Ray, became a partner in the business, which had also acquired the nearby gaming property, The Horseshu.

On March 26, 1971, Craig's father Ray Neilsen died of a heart attack at the age of 57. With Ray's partner Dick Miller also now deceased, 29-year-old Craig joined with his mother, Gwen Neilsen Anderson, to form Neilsen and Company, a construction and real estate development company.

On November 10, 1985, Neilsen was involved in an accident while driving in a snowstorm on an icy U.S. Highway 93 from Jackpot to his office in Twin Falls. Neilsen was treated at hospitals in Twin Falls, Boise and Salt Lake City before being transferred to the Good Samaritan Rehabilitation Institute in Phoenix, Arizona. Neilsen survived the accident but was rendered a quadriplegic; he was unable to move his arms and had minimal function only in his left hand. He required around-the-clock nursing and assistance with daily activities for the rest of his life.

Neilsen returned to work in July 1986 and bought out one shareholder and then the other in 1988 to become sole owner of Cactus Pete's. Cactus Pete's completed a $22 million expansion in 1991 that turned the property into a destination resort.

As states began to relax gambling restrictions, Neilsen began to expand his gaming enterprise. The Mississippi Legislature legalized dockside casino gambling in 1990. Two years later, Neilsen acquired a riverfront property called Delta Point in Vicksburg, Mississippi. That property and the Jackpot casinos were combined to form Ameristar, which Neilsen took public in 1993 to finance the development of the Vicksburg dockside casino, which opened February 27, 1994.

In 1996, the company opened Iowa's largest riverboat casino, Ameristar Casino Council Bluffs, on the Missouri River across from Omaha, Nebraska. Neilsen, along with his son and Council Bluffs General Manager, Ray Neilsen, made a concerted effort to raise the quality of riverboat casinos and in 1999 the casino received the country's first AAA Four Diamond Award for a riverboat.

In 1996 Ameristar relocated its company headquarters from Twin Falls, Idaho, to Las Vegas, Nevada. In 1998, the company opened the Reserve Hotel Casino in Henderson, Nevada in the Las Vegas metropolitan area. In 2001, Ameristar sold this property to Station Casinos, Inc.

The 2000 purchase of additional casinos in Kansas City and St. Charles, Missouri, from Station, doubled Ameristar's annual revenues. Additional growth continued through the completion in August 2002 of a new facility in St. Charles much larger than the temporary casino it replaced. Neilsen was also named the American Gaming Association's Top Performing CEO of 2002.

In 2004, Ameristar purchased its seventh property, Mountain High Casino in Black Hawk, Colorado. Ameristar added Ameristar Casino Hotel East Chicago in Illinois to its portfolio in 2007. Pinnacle Entertainment purchased Ameristar in 2013, ending Ameristar’s corporate presence, but Ameristar-branded properties remain open in Mississippi, Indiana, Iowa and Colorado.

At the time of Neilsen's death in 2006, Ameristar had annual revenues of $1 billion. On November 19, 2006, the Board of Directors of Ameristar Casinos, Inc. was informed of the death of Neilsen and that all the stock and options beneficially owned by him passed to Neilsen’s estate. The persons named in the Last Will and Testament as co-personal representatives of the estate were Ray H. Neilsen and Gordon R. Kanofsky. Neilsen’s estate plan also provided for 25,000,000 shares of Ameristar’s common stock in the estate to pass to The Craig H. Neilsen Foundation, a private foundation primarily focused on spinal cord injury research and treatment. The successor co-trustees of the Foundation were also Ray H. Neilsen and Gordon Kanofsky.

Upon his death, the Times-News in Twin Falls, Idaho memorialized its native son in an editorial titled "Remembering Craig Neilsen, a One-of-a-Kind Entrepreneur." "In style, Neilsen was a capitalist from another generation – making intuitive decisions that sometimes confounded business partners and employees. "He had a vision that I've never found in any other person, said Twin Falls developer Ken Edmunds, a long-time associate. "He could visualize and move toward an objective even when no one else could understand what he was doing. That's how he created Ameristar Casinos. He could conceptualize and envision a project when no else could see what was there. He would often do things that would drive other people crazy because you couldn't understand," said Edmunds. "But he was always right."

Said the Times-News, "He was a gambler, but somehow Craig Neilsen usually ended up holding all the cards."

Neilsen is survived by his son Ray, his daughter-in-law Nancy Neilsen, and stepdaughters Jaime Root and Amanda Shinpaugh.

== Craig H. Neilsen Foundation ==
In 2002, Neilsen established the Craig H. Neilsen Foundation to award grants to a broad spectrum of charities benefiting spinal cord injury (SCI) research and rehabilitation including mechanistic, translational, clinical and psychosocial research as well as quality of life programs, postdoctoral and spinal cord injury medicine fellowships and other projects throughout the United States and Canada.

Through his estate plan, Neilsen left 25 million shares of Ameristar stock, among other assets, to endow the Foundation. Initially, the Foundation continued to make grants using funds generated by dividends on these Ameristar shares. Ultimately, the estate, controlled by Neilsen's son, Ray, and Gordon Kanofsky, sold the shares in 2011 through a share repurchase by the company and a subsequent block trade through an investment bank. Later that year, the estate distributed to the Foundation $450.4 million in net proceeds from the sale of the Ameristar stock, bringing the total endowment funding from the estate to the Foundation to $460.8 million.

In addition to funding Spinal Cord research and programs, a small portion of funds are used for other programs that were of interest to Craig Neilsen including a 2015 $2.5 million joint gift with his son Ray to help fund the Mississippi Civil Rights Museum and Museum of Mississippi History.

== Honors ==
Neilsen was named the American Gaming Association's Top Performing CEO of 2002.

Shortly before his death, Neilsen was named to the American Gaming Association board of directors.

In 2005, Craig Neilsen was inducted into the American Gaming Association's Hall of Fame.

In 2005, Neilsen almost made the Forbes 400 but Hurricane Katrina forced the temporary closing of the Vicksburg casino. The magazine listed his worth at $825 million, just missing the list.

In September 2006, Craig Neilsen was an honoree at the Buoniconti Fund's Great Sports Legends Dinner and later named a charity golf tournament after him.

In 2013, the Association of Academic Physiatrists honored the Craig H. Neilsen Foundation with an Outstanding Public Service Award.

In May 2022, the Mississippi Gaming and Hospitality Association inducted Craig Neilsen into the Mississippi Gaming Hall of Fame.
