= William Fritz (sprinter) =

Canadian sprinter (1914–1995)

Medal record

Men's athletics

Representing Canada

British Empire Games
Gold medal – first place	1938 Sydney	4×440 yards
Silver medal – second place	1934 London	4×440 yards
Silver medal – second place	1938 Sydney	440 yards

William Duncan Fritz (1914 – 1995) was a Canadian athlete who competed in the 1936 Summer Olympics.

He was born in Ferry Bank, Alberta on August 14, 1914. He and died in London, Ontario on October 14, 1995.

In 1936 he was a member of the Canadian relay team which finished fourth in the 4×400 metre event. In the 400 metre competition he finished fifth.

At the 1934 Empire Games he won the silver medal with the Canadian team in the 4×440 yards relay event. In the 440 yards competition he finished fourth. Four years later he was part of the Canadian relay team which won the gold medal in the 4×440 yards contest at the 1938 Empire Games. At these Games he also won the silver medal in the 440 yards event.
