= Bill V. Mullen =

American author and professor

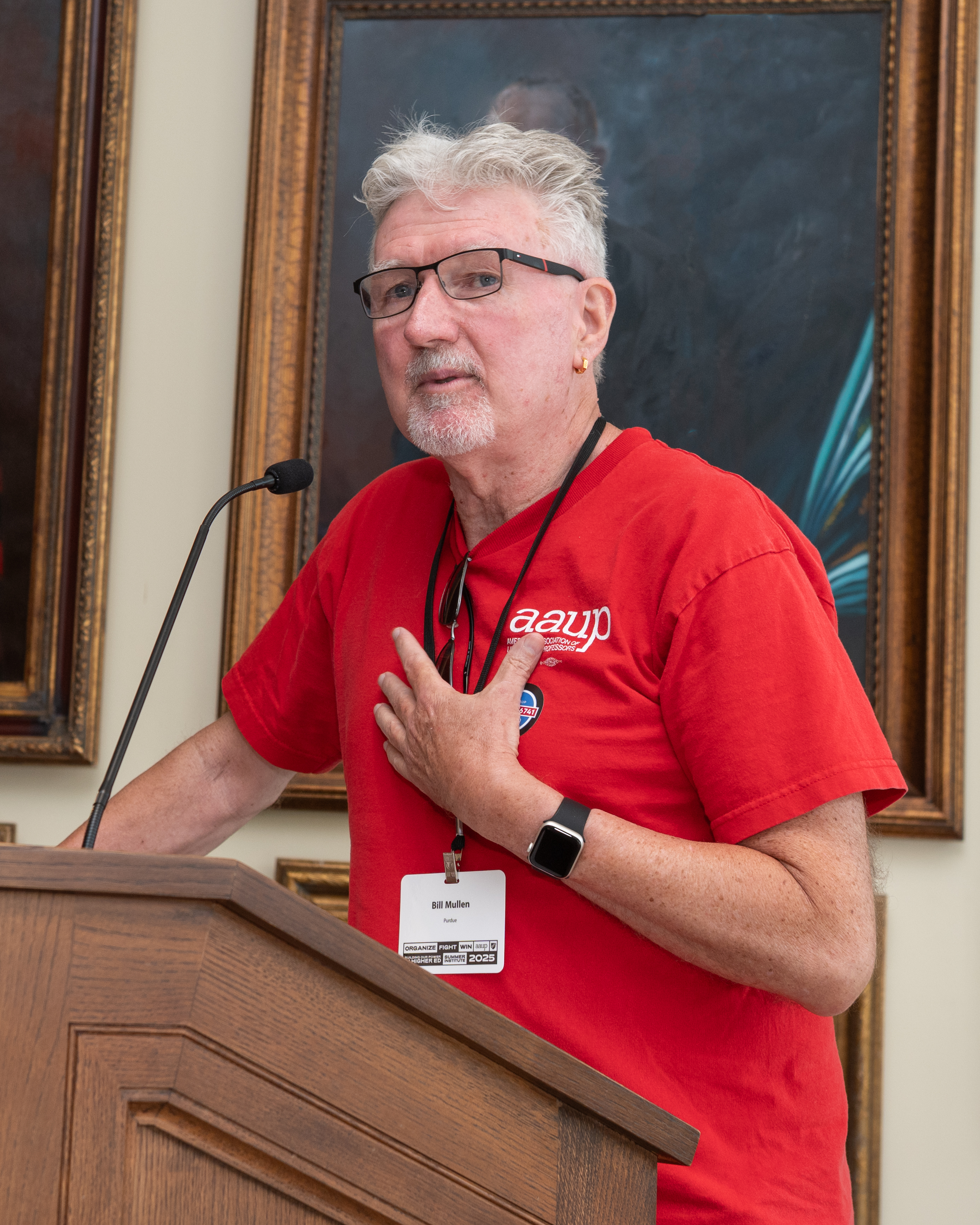
- Born: August 15, 1959; United States
- Education: Ph.D. in English, City University of New York Graduate Center (1990)
- Occupations: Author, scholar, professor emeritus
- Known for: African-American literature, American Studies, cultural politics

Bill V. Mullen (born August 15, 1959) is an American author, scholar, and professor emeritus of American Studies at Purdue University. He is known for his work in African American literature, American studies, and cultural politics.

== Early life and education ==
Bill V. Mullen served as Director of American Studies at Purdue University, where he also mentored doctoral students during his tenure. His research encompasses African American culture, comparative ethnic studies, and the political intersections of literature and history.

He received his Ph.D. degree in English from the City University of New York Graduate Center in 1990.

== Academic career ==
From 1990 to 2000, Mullen taught at Youngstown State University, where he was also active in faculty union work. He later joined the University of Texas at San Antonio as a professor of African American Literature and, in 2005, became a full professor of American Studies at Purdue University. At Purdue, he also served as Director of American Studies (2005–2010) and participated in AAUP faculty governance.

In 1997, Mullen was a Fulbright Lecturer at Wuhan University in China. He currently serves as Secretary/Treasurer of AAUP Local 6741 and is a member of the Coalition for Action in Higher Education (CAHE).

== Published works ==
Mullen has authored and edited several books including:

- Popular Fronts: Chicago and African American Cultural Politics, 1935–1946 (1999).
- Afro-Orientalism (2004).
- Un-American: W.E.B. Du Bois and the Century of World Revolution (2015).
- James Baldwin: Living in Fire (2019).
- The Black Antifascist Tradition: Fighting Back from Anti-Lynching to Abolition (2023) – Co-authored with Jeanelle Hope.
- W.E.B. Du Bois: Revolutionary Across the Color Line (2016)
- We Charge Genocide!: American Fascism and the Rule of Law (Fordham University Press, 2024).

== Edited volumes ==
Mullen has edited or co-edited several influential collections, including:

- A U.S. Antifascism Reader (2020, with Christopher Vials)
- Afro Asia: Revolutionary Political and Cultural Connections Between African Americans and Asian Americans (2008, with Fred Ho)
- W.E.B. Du Bois on Asia: Crossing the World Color Line (with Cathryn Watson)
- Left of the Color Line: Race, Radicalism, and Modern Literatures of the United States (with James Smethurst)

== Journalism and Commentary ==
Mullen regularly contributes reviews and essays to platforms such as the Los Angeles Review of Books, New Politics, Mondoweiss, Electronic Intifada, and Rebel. His writings address topics like fascism, Palestine, anti-Blackness, and U.S. foreign policy.

=== Selected writings: ===
- A Genocide in Its Context", Against the Current (2025)
- James Baldwin and the FBI,” Social Text (2017)
- Spectres of Palestinian History: An Interview with Isabella Hammad”, Mondoweiss (2023)

== Interviews and Public Talks ==
Mullen has appeared in several podcasts, lectures, and literary events

- Book talk on James Baldwin: Living in Fire, New Books Network
- Interview on Law and Disorder podcast discussing We Charge Genocide
- Talk on Democracy Nerd about A U.S. Antifascism Reader
- Panelist at Palestine Writes Literature Festival
