= Michael J. Petrides School =

Public school in New York City

The Michael J. Petrides School
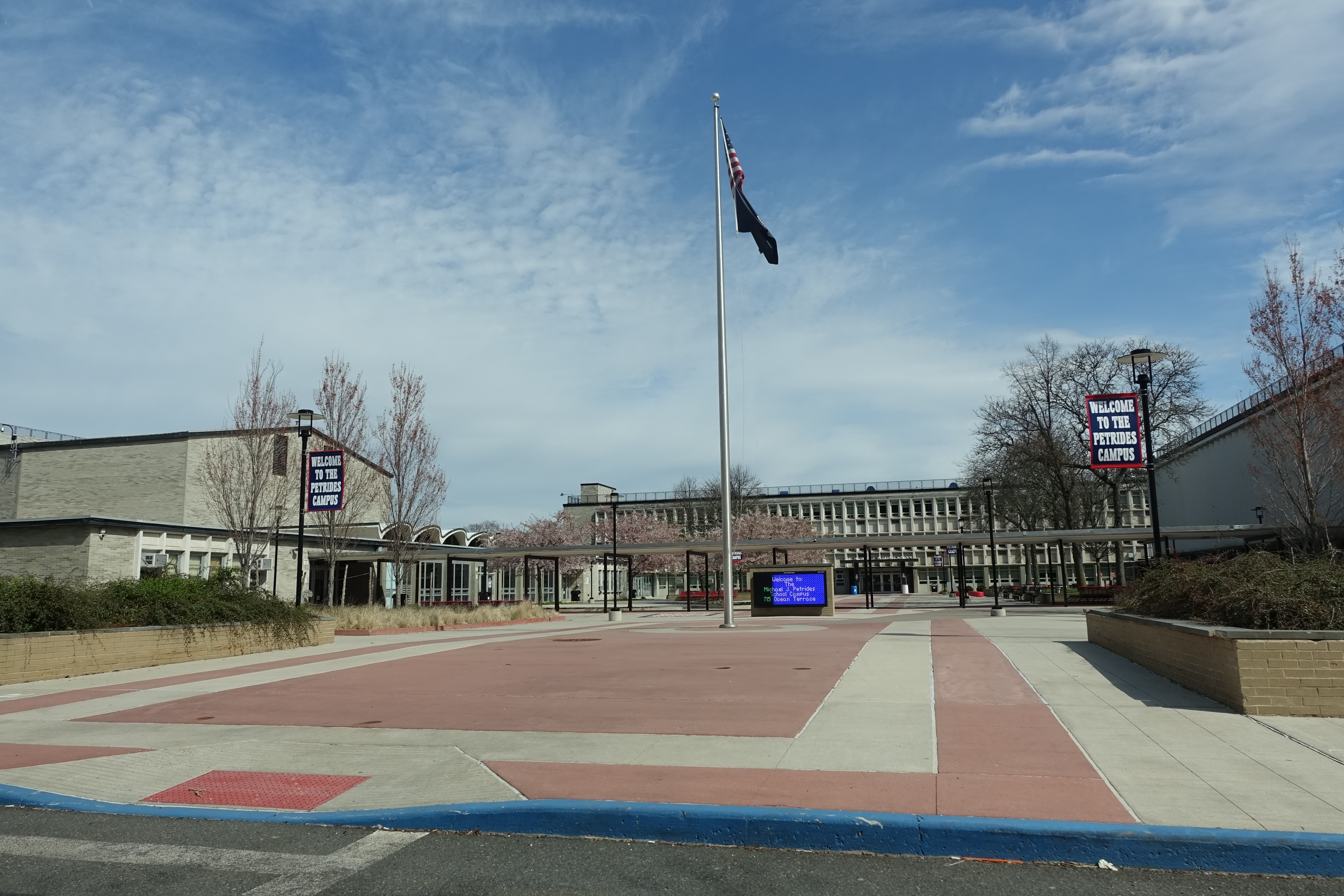

Location
- 715 Ocean Terrace; Sunnyside, Staten Island, New York 10301; United States
- Coordinates: 40°36′33″N 74°06′18″W

Information
- Established: 1995
- Status: Open
- School board: New York City Department of Education
- School district: 31
- Superintendent: Dr. Roderick Palton
- School number: R080
- Principal: Mr. Anthony Tabbitas
- Staff: 100.57 (FTE)
- Grades: K–12
- Enrollment: 1,444 (2022–2023)
- Average class size: 30
- Student to teacher ratio: 14.36
- Language: English
- Hours in school day: 6:20
- Colors: Blue, Black
- Nickname: Panther Nation
- Team name: Panthers
- Accreditation: University of the State of New York
- Newspaper: The Paw Print
- Yearbook: The Legacy
- Website: https://petridesschool.com

The Michael J. Petrides School is a public school located at 715 Ocean Terrace in Staten Island, New York, United States. It was created by Board of Education officials and named for their late colleague and College of Staten Island professor, Michael J. Petrides. The school opened on November 13, 1995, on the former campus of the College of Staten Island. Students apply to attend the school through a lottery system. Eighth graders going into high school receive automatic admission if Petrides is the first choice on their application. The current principal is Anthony Tabbitas.

Petrides educates students from pre-kindergarten through 12th grade, or senior year in high school. It has an assistant principal for each grade category (elementary, middle and high schools). They are:

- Jennifer Ponzi — Elementary School (Grades pre-K - 5)
- BettyAnn Souffrin — Middle School (Grades 6-8)
- Erick Varga — High School (Grades 9-12)

The Petrides School, like many other New York City public schools, also has paraprofessionals, speech therapists, occupational and physical therapists, deans, school aides, and a widely used bus transportation system.

== Admissions ==
Admissions are by lottery for grades K-8. For kindergarten, the school typically receives more than 800 applications for 75-90 seats, of which 15 are reserved for siblings of current students (separate lottery). The handful of open seats in the upper grades are filled by lottery, as well. In ninth grade, class sizes get larger and an extra class is added to the grade. Thousands of students apply for a total of 40 to 55 new seats. These seats are filled through the city's "educational option" formula, designed to achieve a mix of low, average, and high-performing students.

== Controversy ==
Within the past, there had been certain discrepancies according to the school's enrollment policy under the past principal. This was highlighted by a noticeable prevalence to kin relations within the student body and noted recommendations within an alleged random basis lottery system for enrollment. These were recorded in a 1998 investigation report. The report also recorded the absence of critical records that would determine the extent of the irregularities.

In November 2017, a student posed with a gun in a children's bathroom and uploaded the picture to social media. The school closed while authorities investigated, and afterward several security measures were put in place.

From January 2018 to March 2018, several rape cases have been reported as having taken place at the school.

== Extracurricular activities, clubs, and athletics ==
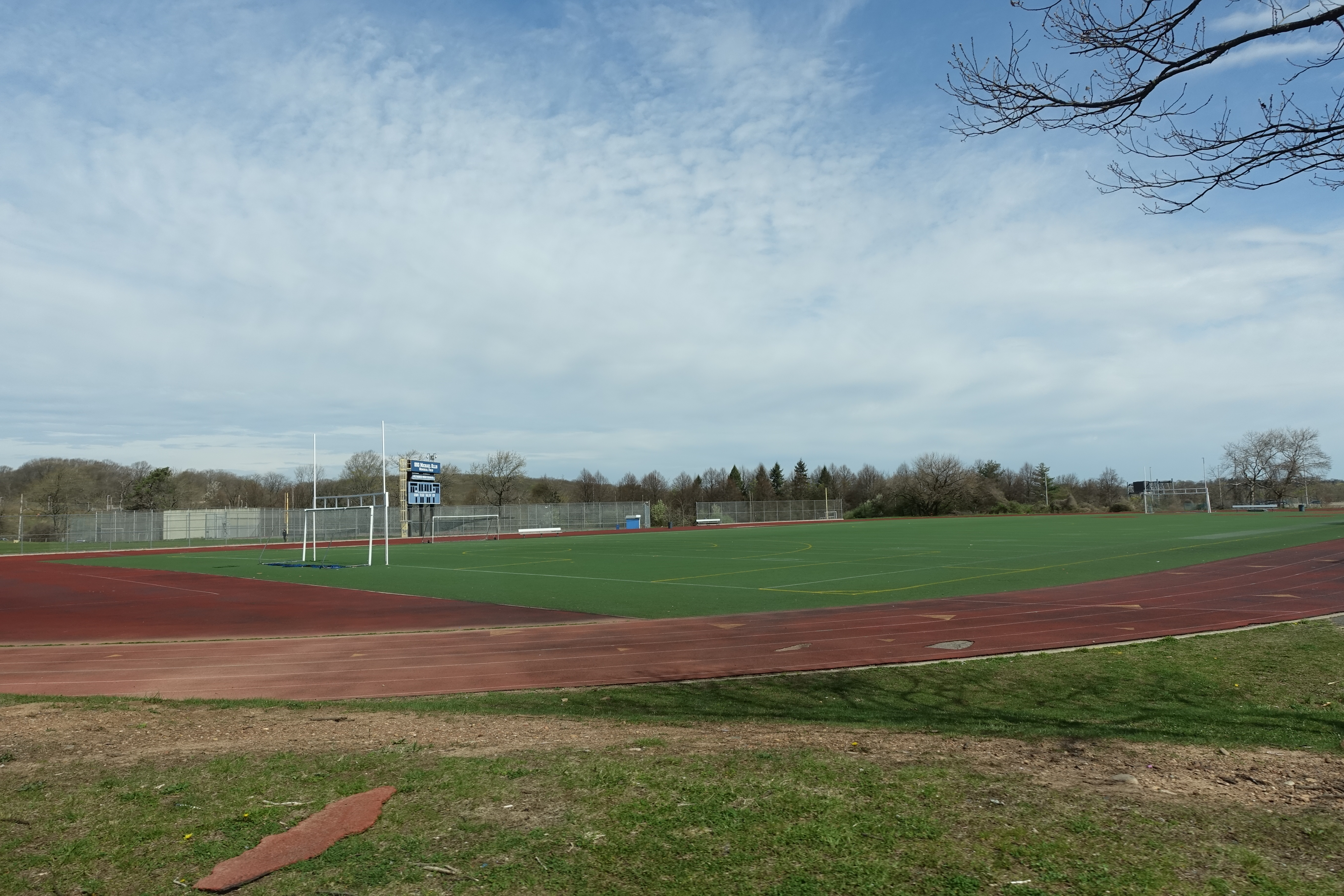
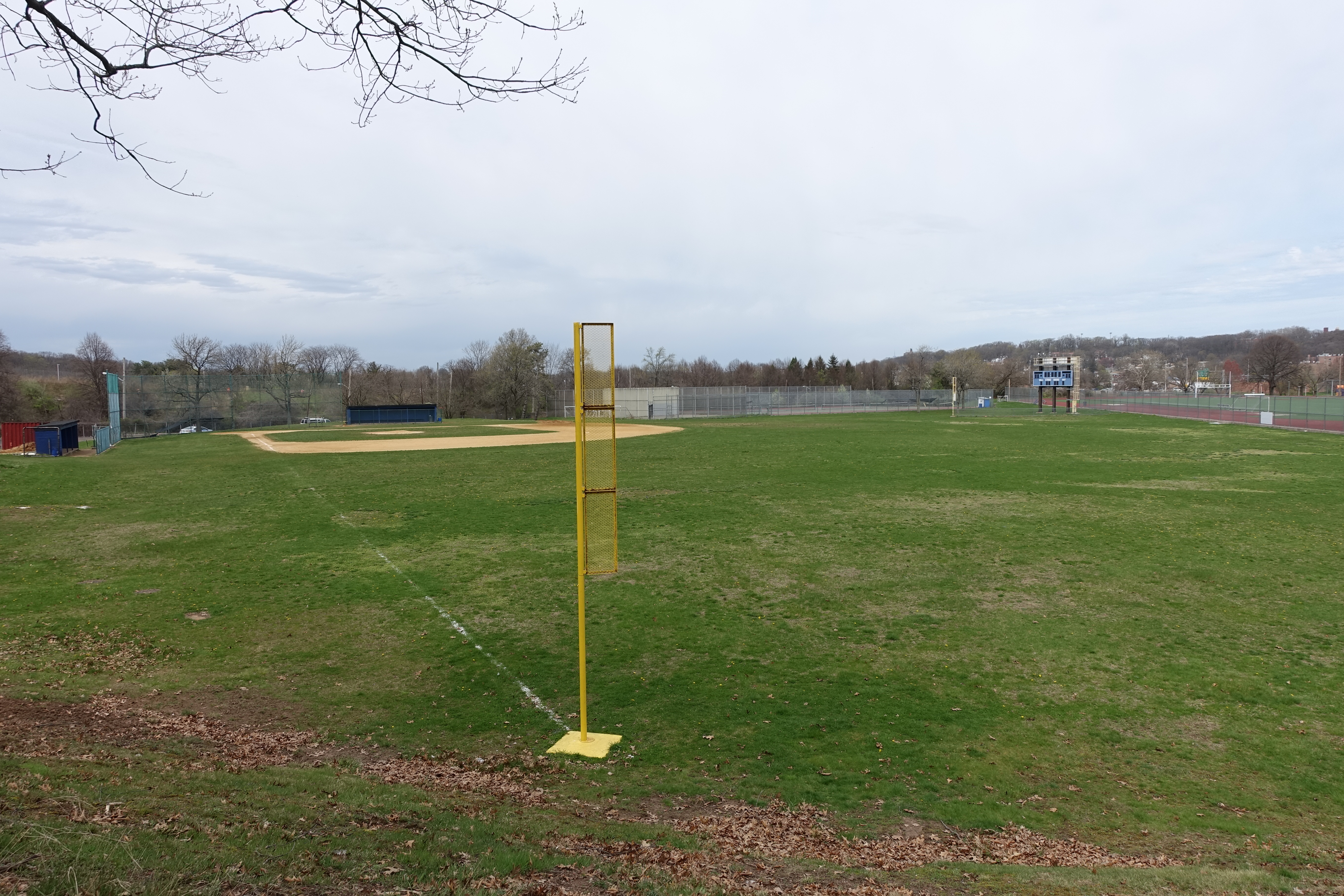
The track and field (top) and baseball field (bottom) in the sports complex of the campus.

High-school students have the opportunity to travel overseas. Destinations have included Italy, Hungary, and Austria. Vermont, Michigan, and Hawaii were also destinations. Fundraisers are also held to help finance the high school's annual trip Habitat for Humanity. In addition, high school students can work with younger students in the elementary school, as classroom student mentors.

- National Honor Society
- SING!
- Student Government
- Council For Unity
- Petrides Against Cancer Society (PACS)
- Petrides Anime Club
- Astronomy Club
- Billion Oyster Project
- Cheerleading
- Chess Club
- Cooking Club
- Dungeons and Dragons Club
- Habitat for Humanity
- History Club
- Nintendo Club
- LGBTQ Club
- Math Team
- Media and Tech Club
- My Brother's Keeper
- My Sister's Keeper
- Newspaper
- Passport Club
- Pokémon, Magic and Yu-Gi-Oh Club
- Spoken word
- Yearbook
- Crochet Club
- Spring Musical
- Winter Concert
- Spring Concert
- Wrestling
- Cross-Country Track
- Indoor Track
- Outdoor Track
- Lacrosse
- Tennis
- Handball
- Fencing
- Football
- Soccer
- Softball
- Volleyball
- Baseball
- Swimming
- Basketball
- Bowling
- Golf

== PSAL Championships ==
Fencing Team

- 2023
- 2024

Football Team

- 2019

Baseball Team

- 2017

Boys' Wrestling Team

- 2008
- 2009
- 2010
- 2011

Girls' Bowling Team

- 2008

Boys' Golf Team

- 2009

== Notable alumni ==
- Tristan Wilds, Actor
- Christine Evangelista, Actress, The Walking Dead
