= Lynda Blackmon Lowery =

American civil rights activist

Lynda Blackmon Lowery (March 22, 1950– December 24, 2025) was an American civil rights activist. She was the youngest person to take part in the entire 50 mile march from Selma to Montgomery.

Lowery's sister, Joanne Blackmon Bland, was also an activist.

In 2017, she authored the book Turning 15 on the Road to Freedom: My Story of the 1965 Selma Voting Rights March.

Following her death, Lowery would lie in state for an hour at Ebenezer Missionary Baptist Church in Selma, Alabama on December 30, 2025, with her funeral also being held there the same day.
