= William J. Fritz =

Geologist and academic administrator

William Fritz

Academic background
- Education: Walla Walla College (BS, MS); University of Montana (PhD)

Academic work
- Discipline: Geology
- Institutions: Georgia State University; College of Staten Island

7th President of the College of Staten Island
- In office August 15, 2012 – December 31, 2021
- Preceded by: Tomás D. Morales
- Succeeded by: Timothy G. Lynch (interim)

William J. Fritz is an American geologist and academic administrator who served as the president of the College of Staten Island. Fritz was appointed interim president on August 15, 2012 and assumed the role in a permanent capacity on May 6, 2014, retiring as of December 31, 2021.

== Education ==
Fritz earned a Bachelor of Science and Master of Science in biology from Walla Walla College and a PhD in geology from the University of Montana.

== Career ==
Fritz has worked as a field geologist, specializing in the sedimentation and tectonics of Yellowstone County, Montana; England; Ireland; and Wales. After graduate school, Fritz joined the faculty of the Amoco Production Company. He also worked as a professor of geology at Georgia State University. He eventually became director of freshmen studies in the College of Liberal Arts and Sciences and senior associate provost for academic programs and enrollment services. Fritz joined the College of Staten Island as interim president in 2012. He became the school's permanent president on May 6, 2014.
