= Gaynor McCown Expeditionary Learning School =

Public school in New York City

Coordinates: 40.58196°N 74.15936°W

- Staten Island, New York; United States

Information
- Type: Expeditionary Learning School
- Motto: Make a Mark. Make a Difference.
- Established: 2008
- School board: New York City Public Schools
- School number: 064
- Principal: Maggie Tang
- Faculty: 29
- Grades: 9-12
- Enrollment: 440
- Hours in school day: 6 hours
- Campus: Suburban Coed
- Colors: black, gray, & blue
- Mascot: Dragon
- Nickname: The Dragons
- Website: Gaynor McCown ELS Official Website

Gaynor McCown Expeditionary Learning School (often referred to as Gaynor McCown ELS, or simply McCown) is a public school located in the New Springville section of Staten Island, New York.

== History ==
Gaynor McCown ELS was named after former NYC Outward Bound director Rosemary Gaynor McCown. The school was founded in 2007 and shares a campus with CSIHSIS and Marsh Avenue Expeditionary Learning School. Traci Frey was the Principal of the school from 2009 to 2019, she was later replaced by Maggie Bailey Tang.

== Sports ==
Gaynor McCown ELS shares PSAL sports team with CSIHSIS PSAL Girls sports include Basketball, Cross Country, Fencing, Flag Football, Outdoor Track, Soccer, Softball, Tennis, Volleyball, and Wrestling.

PSAL Boys sports include Baseball, Basketball, Cross Country, Fencing, Indoor Track, Soccer, Tennis, and Wrestling.
