= Slice, Inc. =

American manufacturer of cutting tools

Slice Inc. was founded by T.J. Scimone in 2008 and is headquartered in Miami, Florida. The company mostly manufactures small hand-held cutting tools, including box-cutters, knives, and scissors.

== History ==
Slice began as a product-design firm specializing in housewares and "developing ultramodern interpretations of kitchen staples like vegetable peelers and cheese graters." The company was successful in a "pocket-size ceramic blade" for opening packages and other shrink-wrapped items," according to Entrepreneur magazine, so "Scimone pivoted, vowing to make common tools like box cutters . . . both sleeker and safer." The company's products are now available at retailers that include Michaels Stores and The Container Store, along with office-supply vendors."

== Products ==
Some of the products manufactured by Slice Inc. are:

Ceramic-Blade Box Cutter, made in two versions – one a manual, three-position and the other an auto-retract. The former was a winner of the Red Dot Design Award for tools in 2011, with its double-sided ceramic blade featuring a rounded tip.

Precision Cutter. Winner of the Good Design Award of the Chicago Athenaeum Museum of Architecture and Design in 2008, the cutter was designed by Karim Rashid, a "designer partner" within Slice. It has "a zirconium-oxide-based micro-ceramic blade that lasts longer than traditional steel blades and never rusts."
