= Radiate (app) =

Mobile application connecting music festival attendees

- Developers: Radiate The World, Inc.
- Operating system: iOS, Android
- Website: www.radiatetheworld.com

Radiate is a mobile app that connects people going to the same events as one another.

They are branded as "not a dating app", although they have been compared to Tinder, especially with Tinder's introduction of Festival Mode. Insomniac, producer of Electric Daisy Carnival has said "One of the primary reasons people go to festivals is for the community, and that’s what Radiate provides."

== History ==
Radiate was founded by Michael Tom and Philip Butler.

On May 27, 2019, Radiate was featured on Product Hunt.

Radiate's gained initial traction around large music festivals, with users using the app to meet and interact with others going to festivals such as Electric Daisy Carnival, Tomorrowland, Ultra Music Festival, and Lollapalooza. Recently, Radiate has also been adding artist tours, including partnerships with artists such as Dillon Francis and Flosstradamus.

In July 2020, Radiate beta tested a feature called Spaces, which allows users to move in a virtual 2-dimensional space, interact with each other through video chat, and listen to or watch a common livestream.

In December 2021, Radiate cofounder Michael Tom was featured in the Forbes 30 Under 30 list.

In January 2023, Radiate started adding local electronic music events, letting people connect with others going through event specific group chats and their "Hey" mechanic.
