= Person-centred planning =

Life-planning model

Person-centred planning (PCP) is a set of approaches designed to assist an individual to plan their life and supports. It is most often used for life planning with people with learning and developmental disabilities, though recently it has been advocated as a method of planning personalised support with many other sections of society who find themselves disempowered by traditional methods of service delivery, including children, people with physical disabilities, people with mental health issues and older people. PCP is accepted as evidence based practice in many countries throughout the world.

Person-centred planning was adopted as government social policy in the United Kingdom through the 'Valuing People' white paper in 2001, and as part of 'Valuing People Now', a 3-year plan, in 2009. It is promoted as a key method for delivering the personalisation objectives of the UK government's 'Putting People First' programme for social care. The coalition government continued this commitment through 'Capable Communities and Active Citizens' (2010), and in 2011 over 30 health and social care organisations set up a sector-wide agreement 'Think Local, Act Personal' (2011) to transform adult social care.

== Background ==
Person Centred Planning discovers and acts on what is important to a person. It is a process for continual listening and learning, focussing on what are important to someone now and in the future, and acting on this in alliance with their family and their friends.

Person-centred planning was created in response to some specific problems with the way in which society responds to people with disabilities. Those who first described the processes were responding to the effects that 'services' can have on people's lives. In this context 'services' refers to the organisations which are set up to help people in relation to their disability (or at least in relation to how other people have responded to that disability). It would include health and social care services funded by government or local authorities, but also privately funded or voluntary sector projects of many kinds.

Person-centered planning has similarities to other processes and ideas, but was first named and described more definitely by a group of people in the US, including the Center on Human Policy's Rehabilitation Research and Training Center (RRTC) on Community Integration e.g., Julie Ann Racino, Zana Lutfiyya, Steve Taylor, John O'Brien, Beth Mount, Connie Lyle O'Brien, technical assistance "partners" of the RRTC (e.g., Michael Smull, Wade Hitzing, Karen Green-McGowen, Nick Arambarri) and person-centred planning in Canada by Jack Pearpoint, Judith Snow and Marsha Forest. Whilst it was developed because of the social and service response to disability, it was quickly recognised to be as useful for many other individuals and groups of people.

Disabled people in the UK and USA developed the social model of disability, arguing for a shift in the balance of power between people and the services on which they rely. Person centred planning is based in the social model of disability because it places the emphasis on transforming the options available to the person, rather than on 'fixing' or changing the person. Specifically person-centred planning was based diversely on principles of community integration/inclusion/ normalisation/social role valorization. Prior to its inception, these principles were crystallised by John O'Brien and Connie Lyle O'Brien in the 'Framework for Accomplishment' which listed five key areas important in shaping people's quality of life, and asserting that services should be judged by the extent to which they enable people to:

- Share ordinary places
- Make choices
- Develop abilities
- Be treated with respect and have a valued social role
- Grow in relationships

The title 'person-centred' is used because those who developed it and used it initially shared a belief that services tend to work in a 'service-centred' way. This 'service-centred' behaviour appears in many forms, but an example is that a person who is isolated would be offered different groups to attend (each run by a service specifically for people sharing a specific label), rather than being helped to make friends in ordinary society.

The person-centered concept grew out of the critique of the "facility-based services" approach in the US (and worldwide) that was central to the development of "support approaches" in the US The nationwide technical assistance funded by the National Institute on Disability Research and Rehabilitation (NIDRR), which included the person-centered approaches, is reported in the "Journal of Vocational Rehabilitation".

A central idea behind person-centred planning, is that services which are set up to respond to problems of social exclusion, disempowerment, and devaluation, can unintentionally make the situation of individual people worse (i.e. further disempower, devalue and exclude people). Person-centred planning is designed specifically to 'empower' people, to directly support their social inclusion, and to directly challenge their devaluation. One of the benefits of person-centered planning is that it can address the perennial "service problems" of ethnicity, gender, culture and age by starting with planning by or with the "whole person".

Person-centred planning is not one clearly defined process, but a range of processes sharing a general philosophical background, and aiming at similar outcomes. As it has become more well known further processes and procedures have also been given the title 'person-centred planning'. Some of these have little in common with person-centred planning as originally envisaged. Person-centered planning through the Rehabilitation Research and Training Center on Community Integration in the US was, in part, an agency and systems change process as opposed to only an "individual planning" process moving to an "individual budgeting process".

Person-centred planning involves the individual receiving the service, with family members, neighbors, employers, community members, and friends, and professionals (such as physician/ doctors, psychiatrists, nurses, support workers, care managers, therapists, and social workers) developing a plan on community participation and quality of life with the individual. In contrast, traditional models of planning have focussed on the person's deficits and negative behaviours, labelling the person and creating a disempowering mindset from the start.

Person-centred planning offers an alternative to traditional models, striving to place the individual at the centre of decision-making, treating family members as partners. The process focusses on discovering the person's gifts, skills and capacities, and on listening for what is really important to the person. It is based on the values of human rights, interdependence, choice and social inclusion, and can be designed to enable people to direct their own services and supports, in a personalised way.

== Methods ==
Person-centered planning utilises a number of techniques, with the central premise that any methods used must be reflective of the individual's personal communication mechanisms and assist them to outline their needs, wishes and goals. There is no differentiation between the process used and the output and outcomes of the PCP; instead, it pursues social inclusion through means such as community participation, employment and recreation.

Beth Mount characterised the key similarities or 'family resemblances' of the different person centred methods and approaches into four themes:

- seeing people first, rather than diagnostic labels
- using ordinary language and images, rather than professional jargon
- actively searching for a person's gifts and capacities in the context of community life
- strengthening the voice of the person, and those who know the person best in accounting for their history, evaluating their present conditions in terms of valued experiences and defining desirable changes in their life

Person centred thinking skills, total communication techniques, graphic facilitation of meetings and problem solving skills are some methods commonly used in the development of a person centred plan, as are PATH (Planning Alternative Tomorrows With Hope), circles of support (Canada), MAPS (Canada), personal futures planning (O'Brien & Mount, US), Essential Lifestyle Planning (Maryland, US), person centred reviews, Getting to Know You (Wisconsin, US), and most recently the use of Person centred thinking tools to build from one page profiles into person centred descriptions/collections of person centred Information and on into full scale plans.

The resultant plan may be in any format that is accessible to the individual, such as a document, a drawing or an oral plan recorded onto a tape or compact disc. Multimedia techniques are becoming more popular for this type of planning as development costs decrease and the technology used becomes more readily available. Plans are updated as and when the individual wishes to make changes, or when a goal or aspiration is achieved. If part of a regular planning process in the US, regular plan updates are usually required by regulatory agencies (e.g., state offices in the US through local agencies).

Person-centred planning can have many effects that go beyond the making of plans. It can create a space during which someone who is not usually listened to has central stage. It can insist that discussion is centred on what the person is telling us is important to them, with their words and behaviours, as well as what others feel is important for the person. It can engage participants personally by allowing them to hear of deeply felt hopes and fears. It can assist people in a circle of support to re-frame their views of the person it is focused on. It can help a group to solve difficult problems. In the US, person-centered planning can help to create new lifestyles, new homes and jobs, diverse kinds of support (informal and formal) and new social relationships.

== Limitations ==
Many of the limitations discussed below reflect challenges and limitations in the implementation of person-centered planning approaches in the context of formal human service systems.

Another approach to this question is to envision person-centered planning as an approach that is anchored in the person's natural community and personal relationship network. In this view, the Person-Centered Plan (PCP) offers a platform for the person and their trusted allies to identify and express their vision and commitments without limiting that expression to what can or will be provided by the service system.

Some time later, the formal system can develop a plan for service delivery that may be based on and consistent with the person's plan, that recognizes and supports the contributions of the person, family and community, and that clearly acknowledges the limitations of what the system is prepared to provide.

John O'Brien sums up the problem of trying to deliver person centredness through formal service systems that have a very different culture thus:

Many human service settings are zones of compliance in which relationships are subordinated to and constrained by complex and detailed rules. In those environments, unless staff commit themselves to be people's allies and treat the rules and boundaries and structures as constraints to be creatively engaged as opposed to simply conforming, person centred work will be limited to improving the conditions of people's confinement in services.

He calls for leadership to challenge these boundaries:

Most service organisations have the social function of putting people to sleep, keeping them from seeing the social reality that faces people with disabilities ... People go to sleep when the slogan that "we are doing the best that is possible for 'them'" distracts from noticing and taking responsibility for the uncountable losses imposed by service activities that keep people idle, disconnected and alienated from their own purposes in life. One way to understand leadership is to see it as waking up to people's capacities and the organisational and systemic practices that devalue and demean those capacities.

A key obstacle to people achieving better lives has been the risk averse culture that has been prevalent in human services for a variety of reasons. Advocates of person centred thinking argue that applying person centred thinking tools to the risk decision-making process, and finding strategies that are based on who the person is, can enable a more positive approach to risk that doesn't use risk as an excuse to trap people in boring and unproductive lives.

The key advocates of PCP and associated person centered approaches warn of the danger of adopting the model in a bureaucratic way – adopting the 'form' of PCP, without the philosophical content. By changing it to fit existing practices rather than using it in its original form, most or all of its effects are lost. The hope of funding it in the USA was to influence the processes, such as planning through the Medicaid home and community-based waiver services for people moving from institutions to the community.

The philosophical content expects services to be responsive to the needs of people that use the service, rather than prescriptive in the types of services offered. These principles are reliant on mechanisms such as individualised funding packages and the organisational capacity to design and deliver "support" services. It is essential that organisations and agencies providing services make a commitment to strive for person-centredness in all of their activities, which can result in major changes in areas of practice such as recruitment, staff training, and business planning and management.

While secondary users may debate the use of person-centered approaches to achieve the myriad goals it attempts to achieve, i.e., increased inclusion (Schwartz, Jacobson and Holburn, 2000) and "defining person-centeredness", others point to recent research such as "The Impact of Person Centred Planning", which suggests that person centred planning can make a considerable difference to people's quality of life and explores the optimum conditions for person centred approaches. 'Valuing People Now' says

Person centred planning has been shown to work. The world's largest study into person centred planning described how it helps people get improvements in important parts of their lives and indicated that this was at no additional cost.

However it continues:

too few people have access to proper person centred planning... In too many local authorities, person centred planning is not at the centre of how things are done. The challenge of the next three years is to take all this innovative work and make sure that more – and eventually all – people have real choice and control over their lives and services.

Person-centered planning in the USA has continued to be investigated at the secondary research level and validated for more general use (e.g., Claes et al. 2010).

Local authorities in Britain are now being challenged by government to change their model to one that is founded on person centred approaches: "This move is from the model of care, where an individual receives the care determined by a professional, to one that has person centred planning at its heart, with the individual firmly at the centre in identifying what is personally important to deliver his or her outcomes." The government recognises that this will require a fundamental change in the way services are organised and think: "Personalisation is about whole system change."

In New York State (USA), the Office for People with Developmental Disabilities (OPWDD), has mandated the use of person-centered planning in all new service development for people with intellectual disabilities. Person-centered planning is central to the new approaches to person-directed supports with are based on stronger self-determination than traditional person-centered approaches.

== Outcomes ==
Person centred thinking and planning is founded on the premise that genuine listening contains an implied promise to take action. Unless what is learned about how the person wishes to live, and where they wish to go in their lives is recorded and acted upon, any planning will have been a waste of time, and more importantly a betrayal of the person and the trust they have placed in those who have planned with them.

In the UK initiatives such as individual budgets and self-directed supports using models like In Control mean that person centred planning can now be used to directly influence a person's Support Planning, giving them direct control over who delivers their support, and how it is delivered.

== See also ==
- Developmental disability
- Direct support professional
- Disability rights movement
- Family Movement
- Independent living
- Options counseling
- Planning Alternative Tomorrows with Hope (PATH)
- Self advocacy
- Social role valorization
