= Long Term Care Benefit Plan =

American life insurance option

A Long Term Care Benefit Plan is an option to sell a life insurance policy in return for 30 to 60 percent of the policy value toward long term health care. A funeral benefit payment is made to the account beneficiary when the person receiving care dies. If the benefit amount is spent while the person is still alive, they are still eligible for Medicaid.

== Overview ==
People have a legal right to sell their life insurance policies. Life insurance policies are sold as Long Term Care Benefit Plans to pay for long term care, including assisted living and home care rather than a policy be surrendered or allowing it to lapse.

A Long Term Care Benefit Plan is also known as an Assurance Benefit Plan. A Benefit Plan is separate from a long term care insurance policy because it allows policy holders to use any form of life insurance policies to pay for long term care. The plan converts a death benefit into a living benefit. Life insurance policies can be converted into a Long Term Care Benefit Plan for 30 to 60 percent of the policy amount to be used for long term care. The sale of a life insurance policy can keep people off Medicaid. By exchanging a life insurance policy for a Long Term Care Benefit Plan, the benefits go toward long term care including assisted living, home health care, and nursing homes. The conversion takes away the responsibility of premium payments from the family and there is no wait period before benefits begin. The policy transfer is subject to regulatory standards in each state. Benefits are deposited into a FDIC-insured benefit account that follows federal and state banking regulations and is held by a nationally chartered bank and trust company. The benefit payments are then made directly to the health care facility on a monthly basis.

If the insured person dies before the benefit period is over, the remaining benefit account is paid to the family or beneficiary as a final expense payment. When the benefit is spent down, the person is still eligible for Medicaid. All benefit accounts reserve either five percent of the death benefit or $5,000 (whichever is less) to provide a funeral benefit payment to the account's beneficiary. These Benefit Plans can be funded through companies such as Life Care Funding and The Lifeline.

== Legislation ==
A bill written by State Senator Jeff Klein was introduced to the New York Assembly in 2008. It aimed to offset the costs of the New York Medicaid program by focusing on accelerated death benefits. The bill was signed into law by Governor David Paterson on December 14, 2010, and expanded the definition of “life insurance.” The change included the ability to provide a living benefit to pay for long term care, meaning people who have been in nursing homes for over three months can apply accelerated death benefits toward housing and care costs. National Conference of Insurance Legislators (NCOIL) passed the Life Insurance Consumer Disclosure Model Law in 2010. Versions of the law have been considered in Oregon, Washington, Wisconsin, and Maine. NCOIL aims to require a clear notice to consumers concerning the eight options available with life insurance, including accelerated death benefits and conversion to Long Term Care Benefit Plans. This basis for legislation requires life insurance companies to provide this information to policy owners older than 60, or if they have a terminal or chronic condition.

By 2013, Medicaid life settlement legislation was introduced in thirteen states, including California, Florida, Kentucky, Louisiana, Maine, Massachusetts, New Jersey, New York and Texas. It had been passed in two states. The legislation aimed to encourage the use of private-pay dollars for long term care through life insurance policy conversion into Long Term Care Benefit plans.
