= Normalization principle =

Offering the same conditions as are offered to other citizens

"The normalization principle means making available to all people with disabilities patterns of life and conditions of everyday living which are as close as possible to the regular circumstances and ways of life or society." Normalization is a rigorous theory of human services that can be applied to disability services. Normalization theory arose in the early 1970s, towards the end of the institutionalisation period in the US; it is one of the strongest and long lasting integration theories for people with severe disabilities.

== Definition ==
Normalization involves the acceptance of some people with disabilities, with their disabilities, offering them the same conditions as are offered to other citizens. It involves an awareness of the normal rhythm of life – including the normal rhythm of a day, a week, a year, and the life-cycle itself (e.g., celebration of holidays; workday and weekends). It involves the normal conditions of life – housing, schooling, employment, exercise, recreation and freedom of choice previously denied to individuals with severe, profound, or significant disabilities.

Wolf Wolfensberger's definition is based on a concept of cultural normativeness: "Utilization of a means which are as culturally normative as possible, in order to establish and/or maintain personal behaviors and characteristics that are as culturally normative as possible." Thus, for example, "medical procedures" such as shock treatment or restraints are not just punitive, but also not "culturally normative" in society. His principle is based upon social and physical integration, which later became popularized, implemented and studied in services as community integration encompassing areas from work to recreation and living arrangement.

=== Theoretical foundations ===
This theory includes "the dignity of risk", rather than an emphasis on "protection" and is based upon the concept of integration in community life. The theory is one of the first to examine comprehensively both the individual and the service systems, similar to theories of human ecology which were competitive in the same period.

The theory undergirds the deinstitutionalization and community integration movements, and forms the legal basis for affirming rights to education, work, community living, medical care and citizenship. In addition, self-determination theory could not develop without this conceptual academic base to build upon and critique.

The theory of social role valorization is closely related to the principle of normalization having been developed with normalization as a foundation. This theory retains most aspects of normalization concentrating on socially valued roles and means, in socially valued contexts to achieve integration and other core quality of life values.

== History ==
The principle of normalization was developed in Scandinavia during the 1960s and articulated by Bengt Nirje of the Swedish Association for Retarded Children with the US human service system, a product of Wolf Wolfensberger formulation of normalization and evaluations of the early 1970s. According to the history taught in the 1970s, although the "exact origins are not clear", the names Bank-Mikkelson (who moved the principle to Danish law), Grunewald, and Nirje from Scandinavia (later Ministry of Community and Social Services in Toronto, Canada) are associated with early work on this principle. Wolfensberger is credited with authoring the first textbook and Rutherford H. (Rud) Turnbull III reports that integration principles are incorporated in US laws.

=== Academe ===
The principle was developed and taught at the university level and in field education during the 1970s, especially by Wolf Wolfensberger of the United States, one of the first clinical psychologists in the field of intellectual disability, through the support of Canada and the National Institute on Mental Retardation (NIMR) and Syracuse University in New York. PASS and PASSING marked the quantification of service evaluations based on normalization, and in 1991 a report was issued on the quality of institutional and community programs in the US and Canada based on a sample of 213 programs in the US, Canada and the United Kingdom.

=== Significance in structuring service systems ===
Normalization has had a significant effect on the way services for people with disabilities have been structured throughout the UK, Europe, Scandinavia, North America, Israel, Australasia (e.g., New Zealand), and, increasingly, other parts of the world. It has led to a new conceptualisation of disability as not simply being a medical issue (the medical model which saw the person as indistinguishable from the disorder, though Wolfensberger continued to use the term into the 2000s), but as a social situation as described in social role valorization.

Government reports began from the 1970s to reflect this changing view of disability (Wolfensberger uses the term devalued people), e.g. the NSW Anti-Discrimination Board report of 1981 made recommendations on "the rights of people with intellectual handicaps to receive appropriate services, to assert their rights to independent living so far as this is possible, and to pursue the principle of normalization." The New York State Quality of Care Commission also recommended education based upon principles of normalization and social role valorization addressing "deep-seated negative beliefs of and about people with disabilities". Wolfensberger's work was part of a major systems reform in the US and Europe of how individuals with disabilities would be served, resulting in the growth in community services in support of homes, families and community living.

=== Critical ideology of human services ===
Normalization is often described in articles and education texts that reflect deinstitutionalization, family care or community living as the ideology of human services. Its roots are European-American, and as discussed in education fields in the 1990s, reflect a traditional gender relationship-position (Racino, 2000), among similar diversity critiques of the period (i.e., multiculturalism). Normalization has undergone extensive reviews and critiques, thus increasing its stature through the decades often equating it with school mainstreaming, life success and normalization, and deinstitutionalization.

== In contemporary society ==
In the United States, large public institutions housing adults with developmental disabilities began to be phased out as a primary means of delivering services in the early 1970s and the statistics have been documented until the present day (2015) by David Braddock and his colleagues. As early as the late 1960s, the normalization principle was described to change the pattern of residential services, as exposes occurred in the US and reform initiatives began in Europe. These proposed changes were described in the leading text by the President's Committee on Mental Retardation (PCMR) titled: "Changing Patterns in Residential Services for the Mentally Retarded" with leaders Burton Blatt, Wolf Wolfensberger, Bengt Nirje, Bank-Mikkelson, Jack Tizard, Seymour Sarason, Gunnar Dybwad, Karl Gruenwald, Robert Kugel, and lesser known colleagues Earl Butterfield, Robert E. Cooke, David Norris, H. Michael Klaber, and Lloyd Dunn.

=== Deinstitutionalization and community development ===
The impetus for this mass deinstitutionalization was typically complaints of systematic abuse of the patients by staff and others responsible for the care and treatment of this traditionally vulnerable population with media and political exposes and hearings. These complaints, accompanied by judicial oversight and legislative reform, resulted in major changes in the education of personnel and the development of principles for conversion models from institutions to communities, known later as the community paradigms. In many states the recent process of deinstitutionalization has taken 10–15 years due to a lack of community supports in place to assist individuals in achieving the greatest degree of independence and community integration as possible. Yet, many early recommendations from 1969 still hold, such as financial aid to keep children at home, establishment of foster care services, leisure and recreation, and opportunities for adults to leave home and attain employment (Bank-Mikkelsen, p. 234-236, in Kugel & Wolfensberger, 1969).

=== Community supports and community integration ===
A significant obstacle in developing community supports has been ignorance and resistance on the part of "typically developed" community members who have been taught by contemporary culture that people with disabilities are somehow fundamentally different and flawed, and that it is in everyone's best interest if they are removed from society (this developing out of 19th century ideas about health, morality, and contagion). Part of the normalization process has been returning people to the community and supporting them in attaining as "normal" as life as possible, but another part has been broadening the category of "normal" (sometimes taught as "regular" in community integration, or below as "typical") to include all human beings. In part, the word "normal" continues to be used in contrast to "abnormal", a term also for differentness or out of the norm or accepted routine (e.g., middle class).

=== Contemporary services and workforces ===
In 2015, public views and attitudes continue to be critical both because personnel are sought from the broader society for fields such as mental health and contemporary community services continue to include models such as the international "emblem of the group home" for individuals with significant disabilities moving to the community. Today, the US direct support workforce, associated with the University of Minnesota, School of Education, Institute on Community Integration can trace its roots to a normalization base which reflected their own education and training at the next generation levels.

People with disabilities are not to be viewed as sick, ill, abnormal, subhuman, or unformed, but as people who require significant supports in certain (but not all) areas of their life from daily routines in the home to participation in local community life. With this comes an understanding that all people require supports at certain times or in certain areas of their life, but that most people acquire these supports informally or through socially acceptable avenues. The key issue of support typically comes down to productivity and self-sufficiency, two values that are central to societal definitions of self-worth. If we as a society were able to broaden this concept of self-worth perhaps fewer people would be labeled as "disabled."

=== Contemporary views on disability ===
During the mid to late 20th century, people with disabilities were met with fear, stigma, and pity. Their opportunities for a full productive life were minimal at best and often emphasis was placed more on personal characteristics that could be enhanced so the attention was taken away from their disability. Linkowski developed the Acceptance of Disability Scale (ADS) during this time to help measure a person's struggle to accept disability. He developed the ADS to reflect the value change process associated with the acceptance of loss theory. In contrast to later trends, the current trend shows great improvement in the quality of life for those with disabilities. Sociopolitical definitions of disability, the independent living movement, improved media and social messages, observation and consideration of situational and environmental barriers, passage of the Americans with Disabilities Act of 1990 have all come together to help a person with disability define their acceptance of what living with a disability means.

Bogdan and Taylor's (1993) acceptance of sociology, which states that a person need not be defined by personal characterizes alone, has become influential in helping persons with disabilities to refuse to accept exclusion from mainstream society. According to some disability scholars, disabilities are created by oppressive relations with society, this has been called the social creationist view of disability. In this view, it is important to grasp the difference between physical impairment and disability. In the article The Mountain written by Eli Clare, Michael Oliver defines impairment as lacking part of or all of a limb, or having a defective limb, organism or mechanism of the body and the societal construct of disability; Oliver defines disability as the disadvantage or restriction of activity caused by a contemporary social organization which takes no or little account of people who have physical (and/or cognitive/developmental/mental) impairments and thus excludes them from the mainstream of society. In society, language helps to construct social reality; for instance, society's way of defining disability which implies that a disabled person lacks a certain ability, or possibility, that could contribute to their personal well-being and enable them to be a contributing member of society versus abilities and possibilities that are considered to be good and useful.

=== Personal wounds, quality of life and social role valorization ===
However, the perspective of Wolfensberger, who served as associated faculty with the Rehabilitation Research and Training Center on Community Integration (despite concerns of federal funds), is that people he has known in institutions have "suffered deep wounds". This view, reflected in his early overheads of PASS ratings, is similar to other literature that has reflected the need for hope in situations where aspirations and expectations for quality of life had previously been very low (e.g., brain injury, independent living). Normalization advocates were among the first to develop models of residential services, and to support contemporary practices in recognizing families and supporting employment. Wolfensberger himself found the new term social role valorization to better convey his theories (and his German Professorial temperament, family life and beliefs) than the constant "misunderstandings" of the term normalization.

=== Related theories and development ===
Related theories on integration in the subsequent decades have been termed community integration, self-determination or empowerment theory, support and empowerment paradigms, community building, functional-competency, family support, often not independent living (supportive living), and in 2015, the principle of inclusion which also has roots in service fields in the 1980s.

== Misconceptions ==
Normalization is so common in the fields of disability, especially intellectual and developmental disabilities, that articles will critique normalization without ever referencing one of three international leaders: Wolfensberger, Nirje, and Bank Mikkelson or any of the women educators (e.g., Wolfensberger's Susan Thomas; Syracuse University colleagues Taylor, Biklen or Bogdan; established women academics (e.g., Sari Biklen); or emerging women academics, Traustadottir, Shoultz or Racino in national research and education centers (e.g., Hillyer, 1993). In particular, this may be because Racino (with Taylor) leads an international field on community integration, a neighboring related concept to the principle of normalization, and was pleased to have Dr. Wolf Wolfensberger among Center Associates. Thus it is important to discuss common misconceptions about the principle of normalization and its implications among the provider-academic sectors:

- a) Normalization does not mean making people normal – forcing them to conform to societal norms.

Wolfensberger suggested in 1980 that "Normalizing measures can be offered in some circumstances, and imposed in others." This view is not accepted by most people in the field, including Nirje. Advocates emphasize that the environment, not the person, is what is normalized, or as known for decades a person-environment interaction.

Normalization is very complex theoretically, and Wolfensberger's educators explain his positions such as the conservatism corollary, deviancy unmaking, the developmental model (see below) and social competency, and relevance of social imagery, among others.

- b) Normalization does not support "dumping" people into the community or into schools without support.

Normalization has been blamed for the closure of services (such as institutions) leading to a lack of support for children and adults with disabilities. Indeed, normalization personnel are often affiliated with human rights groups. Normalization is not equivalent to deinstitutionalization, though institutions have been found to not "pass" in service evaluations and to be the subject of exposes. Normalization was described early as alternative special education by leaders of the deinstitutionalization movement.

However, support services which facilitate normal life opportunities for people with disabilities – such as special education services, housing support, employment support and advocacy – are not incompatible with normalization, although some particular services (such as special schools) may actually detract from rather than enhance normal living bearing in mind the concept of normal 'rhythms' of life.

- c) Normalization supports community integration, but the principles vary significantly on matters such as gender and disability with community integration directly tackling services in the context of race, ethnicity, class, income and gender.

Some misconceptions and confusions about normalization are removed by understanding a context for this principle. There has been a general belief that 'special' people are best served if society keeps them apart, puts them together with 'their own kind, and keep them occupied. The principle of normalization is intended to refute this idea, rather than to deal with subtlety around the question of 'what is normal?' The principle of normalization is congruent in many of its features with "community integration" and has been described by educators as supporting early mainstreaming in community life.

- d) Normalization supports adult services by age range, not "mental age", and appropriate services across the lifespan.

Arguments about choice and individuality, in connection with normalization, should also take into account whether society, perhaps through paid support staff, has encouraged them into certain behaviours. For example, in referring to normalization, a discussion about an adult's choice to carry a doll with them must be influenced by a recognition that they have previously been encouraged in childish or self-infantilizing behaviours, and that society currently expects them to behave childishly. Most people who find normalization to be a useful principle would hope to find a middle way - in this case, an adult's interest in dolls being valued, but with them being actively encouraged to express it in an age-appropriate way (e.g., viewing museums and doll collections), with awareness of gender in toy selection (e.g., see cars and motorsports), and discouraged from behaving childishly and thus accorded the rights and routines only of a "perpetual child". However, the principle of normalization is intended also to refer to the means by which a person is supported, so that (in this example) any encouragement or discouragement offered in a patronising or directive manner is itself seen to be inappropriate.

- e) Normalization is a set of values, and early on (1970s) was validated through quantitative measures (PASS, PASSING).

Normalization principles were designed to be measured and ranked on all aspects through the development of measures related to homes, facilities, programs, location (i.e. community development), service activities, and life routines, among others. These service evaluations have been used for training community services personnel, both in institutions and in the community.

Normalization as the basis for education of community personnel in Britain is reflected in a 1990s reader, highlighting Wolf Wolfensberger's moral concerns as a Christian, right activist, side-by-side ("How to Function with Personal Model Coherency in a Dysfunctional (Human Service) World") with the common form of normalization training for evaluations of programs. Community educators and leaders in Britain and the US of different political persuasions include John O'Brien and Connie Lyle O'Brien, Paul Williams and Alan Tyne, Guy Caruso and Joe Osborn, Jim Mansell and Linda Ward, among many others.
