= Geriatric care management =

- Other names: Elder care management, senior health care management, professional care management
- Specialty: Geriatrics

Geriatric care management is the process of planning and coordinating care of the elderly and others with physical and/or mental impairments to meet their long term care needs, improve their quality of life, and maintain their independence for as long as possible. It entails working with persons of old age and their families in managing, rendering and referring various types of health and social care services. Geriatric care managers accomplish this by combining a working knowledge of health and psychology, human development, family dynamics, public and private resources as well as funding sources, while advocating for their clients throughout the continuum of care. For example, they may assist families of older adults and others with chronic needs such as those suffering from Alzheimer's disease or other dementia.

== Overview ==
Geriatric care management integrates health care and psychological care with other needed services such as: housing, home care services, nutritional services, assistance with activities of daily living, socialization programs, as well as financial and legal planning (e.g. banking, trusts). A care plan tailored for specific circumstances is prepared after a comprehensive assessment has taken place, and is continuously monitored and modified as needed. A comprehensive geriatric care assessment is thorough and can take anywhere from two to five hours in length, this of course is broken down into two or three assessment visits with the patient/family members. The comprehensive assessment is really a compilation of smaller individual assessments with the first one being a primary intake assessment which includes demographic type data as well as a health history, social history, and legal/financial history. From there, a medication profile assessment is included, as well as an assessment of ADLs (activities of daily living) and IADLs (instrumental activities of daily living). In addition other assessments may include; falls risk assessment, home safety assessment, nutritional assessment, depression assessment, pain assessment, mini mental state exam (MMSE), MiniCog clock drawing exam (cognitive assessment), balance assessment, and gait assessment (ability to walk). If the comprehensive geriatric care management assessment is being conducted by a registered nurse, then a physical assessment can be included such as vitals signs recording temperature, pulse, respirations, blood pressure, oxygen saturation, and sometimes FBS or RBS (fasting or random blood sugar) checks for diabetics.

== Geriatric care managers ==
Geriatric care managers typically have formal education and experience in nursing, social work, gerontology or other health service areas. They are expected to have extensive knowledge about the costs, quality, and availability of services in their communities.

Professional care managers help individuals, families, and other caregivers adjust and cope with the challenges of aging or disability by:

- Conducting care-planning assessments to identify needs, problems and eligibility for assistance;
- Screening, arranging, and monitoring in-home help and other services;
- Reviewing financial, legal, or medical issues;
- Offering referrals to specialists to avoid future problems and to conserve assets;
- Providing crisis intervention;
- Acting as a liaison to families at a distance;
- Making sure things are going well and alerting families of problems;
- Assisting with moving their clients to or from a retirement complex, assisted living facility, rehabilitation facility or nursing home;
- Providing client and family education and advocacy;
- Offering counseling and support.

Depending on the country and health care organization, professional fees for the services of geriatric care managers are primarily billed privately on a privately paid fee-for-service basis. In the United States, they are not covered by Medicaid, Medicare nor by most private health insurance policies. However, clients may be able to bill some services to long term care insurance, depending on the history of the individual case.

== See also ==
- Elderly care
- Geriatric nursing
- Health advocacy
- Long term care
- Patient advocacy
