= John O'Brien (advocate) =

Advocate of disability rights and Person Centred Planning

John O'Brien speaking in Chorley in 2007

John O'Brien was a leading thinker who has written widely in the field of disability. He died on Friday 27th June, 2025. He was a pioneer and lifelong advocate of Person Centred Planning. To this end, he was co-developer of two models for person centred planning, namely the McGill Action Planning System (MAPS) and Planning Alternative Tomorrows with Hope (PATH). His values based approach emphasises learning with each person about the direction their lives could take, challenging and overcoming practices, structures and values that lead to segregation and underestimation rather than inclusion, and an approach to change in people's lives based on 'imagining better'. His thinking is based on Social Role Valorisation and the Social model of disability. He was an associate editor of Mental Retardation, and on the advisory boards of the Georgia Advocacy Office and Georgia PASS. With Herbert Lovett, O'Brien co-wrote “Finding A Way Toward Everyday Lives,” a paper cited by others in the disabilities field as a significant reference point in the early development of person-centered planning.

== Bibliography ==
- O'Brien, J. and Beth Mount. 2015, Pathfinders: People with Developmental Disabilities and Their Allies Building Communities That Work for Everybody, Inclusion Press, Toronto
- O'Brien, J. and Blessing, Carol. 2011, Conversations on Citizenship & Person-Centered Work, Inclusion Press, Toronto
- O'Brien, J., Pearpoint, Jack, & Kahn, Lynda. 2010, The PATH & MAPS Handbook: Person-Centered Ways to Build Community, Inclusion Press, Toronto
- O'Brien, J. and Lyle O'Brien, C. 1988. A Little Book About Person Centred Planning. Inclusion Press, Toronto.
- O'Brien, J. and Lyle O'Brien, C. Make a difference: A Guidebook for Person Centred Direct Support. Inclusion Press, Toronto
- O'Brien, J. and Pearpoint, Jack. 2007, Person-Centered Planning with MAPS and PATH - A Workbook for Facilitators, Inclusion Press, Toronto
- O'Brien, J. and Lyle O'Brien, C. 2006. Implementing Person Centred Planning: Voices of Experience. Inclusion Press, Toronto.
- O'Brien, J. and Lyle O'Brien, C. 2000. Members of Each Other. Inclusion Press, Toronto.
- O'Brien, J. (2006) Reflecting on Social Roles: Identifying Opportunities to Support Personal Freedom & Social Integration
- O'Brien, J., & Lyle O'Brien, C. (1998). The politics of person centered planning Part II. The Council, 15(2), 3. Towson, MD: The Council on Quality and Leadership in Supports for People with Disabilities.
- O'Brien, J., & Lyle O'Brien, C. (1998). The politics of person centered planning Part I. The Council, 15(1), 3. Towson, MD: The Council on Quality and Leadership in Supports for People with Disabilities.
- O'Brien, J., Lyle O'Brien, C. & Jacob, Gail., 1998, Celebrating the Ordinary: The Emergence of Options in Community Living as a Thoughtful Organization, Inclusion Press, Toronto
- Lyle O'Brien, C., & O'Brien, J. (2002). The origins of person-centered planning: A community of practice perspective. In S. Holburn & P Vietze (Eds.), Research and practice in person-centered planning. Baltimore: Paul H. Brookes Publishing Co..
- O'Brien, J. (in press). The genius of the principle of normalization. In R. Flynn & R. LeMay (Eds.), A quarter-century of normalization and social role valorization: Evolution and impact. Ottawa: University of Ottawa Press.
- O'Brien, J., & Lyle O'Brien, C. (1998). The politics of person centered planning. In C. Griffin, M. Flaherty, D. Hammis, R. Shelley, N. Maxson, & D. Spas (Eds.), Knowing the ropes: Reaching new heights in rural community employment (pp. 26–30). Missoula, MT: The Rural Institute, University of Montana.
- O'Brien, J. (2002). Numbers and faces: The ethics of person-centered planning. In S. Holburn & P. M. Vietze (Eds.), Person-centered planning: Research, practice, and future directions (pp. 399–414). Baltimore: Paul H. Brookes Publishing Co.
