= The Comet (transit) =

US regional transportation authority

The COMET
- Founded: 2002
- Headquarters: 3613 Lucius Road
- Locale: Columbia, South Carolina
- Service area: Richland and Lexington Counties, South Carolina
- Service type: Bus, paratransit and other public transportation services
- Routes: 39
- Fleet: 66
- Annual ridership: 2.8 million
- Fuel type: Diesel, bio-diesel, propane
- Operator: RATP Dev
- Chief executive: Maurice Pearl
- Website: catchthecometsc.gov

The COMET, officially the Central Midlands Regional Transit Authority (CMRTA), is a regional transportation authority formed by Richland County, City of Columbia, and Lexington County on April 24, 2000, by the Central Midlands Council of Governments. The COMET consists of an intergovernmental agreement signed by Richland County, the City of Columbia, the City of Forest Acres, and Lexington County to fund, operate and maintain public transit services and mass transportation in Richland and Lexington counties in the Columbia metropolitan area of South Carolina.

The agency has standard fixed-route services, ReFlex services, and dial-a-ride paratransit within the county. The COMET transports more than 2.8 million passengers annually on a fleet of more than 80 buses, vans, and trolleys. The COMET supports and provides opportunities for additional mobility through partnerships with attractions, neighborhoods, events, Uber, Lyft, and Blue Bike of S.C. All services are operated by RATP Dev USA Inc. of Fort Worth, Texas.

== History ==
=== Prior to 2002: Utility-Run Transit ===
Until 2002, the public transit system in Columbia was operated by the South Carolina Electric & Gas Company (SCE&G), a successor of a former streetcar system. At the time, the greater Columbia, South Carolina metropolitan area was the last area in the United States where the local private utility company (SCE&G) was the owner and operator of mass transit services. The City of Columbia signed a deal with SCE&G in December 2001 to take over the transit system effective the following year in exchange for a 30-year utility franchise.

=== 2002-2012: Transit Authority Established ===
The Central Midlands Regional Transit Authority (CMRTA) — referred to hereafter as "The COMET (then CMRTA)" —was established on October 16, 2002, and contracted Connex to operate its bus routes. The local council of governments oversaw the development of a transit authority. The COMET (then CMRTA) was made up of 15 local governments, two counties, and 13 municipalities with an approximately 35-person board. Though operations changed hands, the management did not — Curtis L. Hamilton ran the operations while under SCE&G/SCANA and became the general manager for the Columbia System once The COMET (then CMRTA) was formed. Connex TCT operated the COMET (then CMRTA).. The system ran 43 buses with updated routes.

In January 2003, The COMET (then CMRTA) implemented its first fare increase of $.25 (from $.75 to $1.00). It also implemented the initial system-wide service realignment, adjusting fixed routes to serve the community better. Prior to that, no route changes had been made by SCE&G in many years. Significant, though temporary, funding was secured for The COMET (then CMRTA) towards the end of 2003. Annual financial contributions were set to come in from SCE&G from October 2003 through October 2009. Additionally, in October 2003, the City of Columbia began providing $1 million to The COMET (then CMRTA) to fund the system's operational and capital needs. The CMRTA/City agreement required that the City contribute $90,000 towards offsetting the operating deficit of the trolley services. This agreement between the City and The COMET (then CMRTA) allowed for annual payment until a long-term, dedicated local source of funding was secured.

Those contributions combined with available Federal and State funding were enough to cover operating and capital expenses at the time. In August 2005, The COMET (then CMRTA) implemented system-wide adjustments, including eliminating under-performing routes for a cost savings of approximately $500,000, which was invested in new additional services. Then, in September 2005, it eliminated trolley shuttle services, resulting in a savings of approximately $600,000 annually. As a result of this discontinuation of certain shuttle services, the City of Columbia discontinued payment of the $90,000 annual contribution (per the agreement between the City and The COMET (then CMRTA) to support downtown trolley shuttle services). In order to make up for lost funding, the second fare increase for The COMET (then CMRTA) was implemented in December 2005, increasing $.25 (from $1.00 to $1.25).

In November 2006, Richland County Council voted to temporarily increase the County Road Maintenance Fee to provide interim financing to The COMET (then CMRTA) for services delivered in Richland County only. That same year, County Council funded a comprehensive study of overall transit/transportation and green space needs completed in 2008.

As the end of SCE&G's transitional funding approached in 2009, it became more critical for The COMET (then CMRTA) to secure long-term, dedicated funding. In fall 2008, the City and Richland County formed an Ad-Hoc Interim Transit Funding Committee to work together to formulate a plan for interim funding to support transit operations. However, the 2008 recession caused a delay in the council's plan to put the funding tax up for a vote. Because of fiscal instability, The COMET (then CMRTA) saw a decline in rider use and community confidence. After a $2.5 million funding shortfall and bus service cuts in 2010, The COMET (then CMRTA) Board placed a sales tax on the November ballot to fund transit. Unfortunately, the 1-cent sales tax referendum failed, albeit by a very small margin of approximately 2,200 votes, resulting in The COMET (then CMRTA) once again facing a local funding crisis.

Instability continued to follow, and in 2011, the executive director and general manager retired along with a restructuring of the board, resulting in a nearly complete turnover. In May 2012, The COMET (then CMRTA) reduced service and offerings due to these budget cuts drastically. On November 6, 2012, voters in Lexington and Richland counties approved a one-cent sales tax, known as the penny tax, to fund public transit service. Many factors are believed to contribute to the passing of the penny tax, including the cuts that were made in service earlier that year. Additionally, the council adjusted the penny tax to contribute to other transportation-related issues, such as improvements for roads, sidewalks, and greenways. A government activist filed a lawsuit in late 2012, arguing that the election had been subject to widespread disenfranchisement. The South Carolina Supreme Court upheld the election and tax in March 2013, dismissing the case and allowing planning on service restoration to continue.

=== 2012-present: Creation of The COMET ===
In April 2013, the Central Midlands Regional Transit Authority re-branded itself as "The COMET" with new liveries and branding to follow. The COMET, now with its first-ever dedicated funding, was able to return more than 24,000 hours of service. 2013 brought many improvements such as hiring new employees, expanding services, and a partnership with the University of South Carolina provided the Gamecock Express, generating over 10,000 trips in a day.

In July 2013, Bob Schneider from VEOLIA Transportation was hired as the full-time executive director, beginning work in August 2013. In 2014 a long list of improvements was implemented — flex services were expanded into rural areas, weekend service was launched, a new customer-centered smartphone ride-tracking and the stop-predicting app was introduced, “Freshman Freedom” passes were distributed in collaboration with local colleges and universities to provide free transit to first-year students, and new amenities for passengers such as bus shelters, benches, bike racks and more.

The Vision 2020 plan was adopted and began taking effect in August 2014. This plan provided a new direction and approach to public transportation in the Midlands in order to create a more innovative, connected, and accessible system.

By 2015, ridership had increased 136% since the passage of the Penny. In 2016, The COMET replaced 1,200 bus stop signs for ADA-compliant signage. The number of routes offered had increased to 28 total (up from 18 in 2012) and had a total of 32 propane-powered vehicles in service. A plethora of new programming was implemented in 2017. In addition to the Gamecock Express and First-Year Freedom Pass (formerly “Freshman Freedom”), The COMET partnered with Richland School District Two to allow students, faculty and staff to ride The COMET for free. The Soda Cap Connector was introduced — a free, simple system of dedicated routes that connect riders to major local destinations in the downtown area. That year, The COMET updated nearly its entire fleet with the purchase of new diesel and propane buses that use cleaner fuel and are quieter than the previous Blue Bird buses. It also introduced a travel training program, Transit Academy, where community members are trained on how to ride the bus, how The Comet's funding works, plan their trip, and be informative ambassadors to the community for transit. Also in 2017, Executive Director Bob Schneider, who had been with the organization since the passing of the Penny Tax, left The COMET. Interim Executive Director Ann August took charge for a transitional year.

Progress continued in 2018 with new programs and increased services such as an expanded network of schedules to be available at more public locations outside of the downtown area, including West Columbia, Cayce, and Northeast. Routes offered had increased to 38 total (up from 18 in 2012). The COMET on the GO! was launched; a partnership with Lyft and Uber aimed at increasing access to fresh food for community members living in a food desert. Fares were restructured for the first time since 2014 in an effort to serve customers better. Safety measures were increased with additional police protection on all buses, stops, and transit centers. In 2018, John Andoh became the executive director. Andoh left The COMET in April 2021 to accept a position at the Columbia Area Transit District in Hood River, OR. In November 2021, Derrick Huggins was appointed Interim CEO and executive director.

In 2019, a partnership with Richland Library allowed The COMET to add “Little Free Libraries” to buses and COMET Central to promote literacy.

Due to The COMET's effective financial controls and successful audits, The Government Finance Officers Association of the United States and Canada (GFOA) awarded a Certificate of Achievement for Excellence in Financial Reporting to The COMET for its Comprehensive Annual Financial Report (CAFR) for FY2018. This was the first year that The COMET had achieved this prestigious award, and it was the first regional transportation authority in S.C. to be recognized at this level.

== Services ==
=== Bus ===
The COMET bus system is made up of 34 standard bus routes that run regularly, every day of the week. These routes cover the entirety of Richland and parts of Lexington counties, cross over into Newberry as well as Sumter. The regular The COMET routes are accessible by fare or pass, and most routes begin and end at COMET Central, located at Sumter and Laurel Streets. Each COMET bus has a bike rack with room for two bikes. Bikes racks are located at the front of buses.

=== Paratransit (DART) ===
DART is the complementary Americans with Disabilities Act (ADA) paratransit service for persons with disabilities unable to board The COMET buses or access a transit stop for any trip purpose. In order to use DART, customers must complete an ADA Certification Application. DART operates the same service hours as The COMET non-express fixed routes. Customers must board, travel, and alight within 3/4 mile of an operating The COMET route. Please see the system map for the DART service boundary.

=== Soda Cap Connector ===
This is a $1.00 downtown shuttle intended for locals and tourists to travel between districts in the urban core of Columbia. The Soda Cap Connector uses trolleys and buses to service its routes – traveling between Five Points, Main Street, The Vista, Cayce, and West Columbia. The Soda Cap also runs seasonally to Segra Park, home of the single-A baseball team, the Columbia Fireflies, located within the BullStreet District during home games.

=== Orbit Connector ===
The Orbit is a downtown loop with stops every half an hour. The route is $1.00 and runs seven days a week. The route runs along Sumter, Blossom, Assembly, and Richland streets with stops near the State House, the University of South Carolina, Prisma Health Baptist, and the Richland County Library.

=== ReFlex ===
The ReFlex is a bus route that is flexible enough for the bus to take a detour to pick up a passenger, not on an existing route or stop. Users must live within a certain radius of the bus route to use the service and access the service by calling in advance to schedule their pick-up. The five ReFlex routes serve Denny Terrace, Lower Richland Boulevard, Eastover/Gadsden, Hopkins and Lexington/ Batesburg-Leesville.

=== VanPool ===
The COMET Vanpool is designed to assist employees in forming vanpools for the home-to-work commute. A monthly subsidy of $500 is available to help with the cost of the vanpool. Commute with Enterprise provides seven, twelve and, fifteen passenger vans. Vans must originate or end in Richland or Lexington Counties. A minimum of five people, including the primary driver, is required for formation.

=== Blue Bike SC ===
The Blue Bike SC program is intended to be an extension of a passenger's transit trip. Riders on the transit system can access a code from the bus that allows 45 free minutes of use on any Blue Bike located at various stations within downtown Columbia. The Blue Bike SC partnership expands the “first mile/last mile” opportunities for The COMET users. This is the first program in the United States where a mass transit system and bike share operator have partnered to give transit riders free access to bikes.

=== COMET on the Go! ===
Providing transit service via bus in the less populated areas of Richland and Lexington Counties would not operate efficiently. To continue serving community members in those areas, particularly among low-income residents, The COMET began a demonstration partnership in FY2019 with Rideshare operator Lyft. Under this partnership, two new programs were created — COMET To The Market and COMET @ Night.

The COMET will pay up to $8.00 for ridesharing trips that start and end in The COMET fixed route service area on Lyft.

== Governance ==
The COMET is a multi-county authority that is governed by a board of directors. The Board consists of 11 voting directors appointed as follows: Richland County (3) Columbia (3) Forest Acres (1) Lexington County (1) Richland County Legislative Delegation (3). Positions on The COMET board are directly appointed by the organizations they represent.
