= AHRC New York City =

Organization serving disabled people in New York City

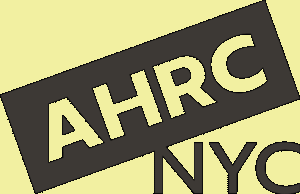
- Formation: 1949; 77 years ago
- Founders: Ann Greenberg; Julie Schwartz; Jerry Weingold; Nat Feder
- Type: 501(c)(3) nonprofit organization
- Legal status: Active
- Purpose: To serve people with intellectual and developmental disabilities
- Headquarters: 83 Maiden Lane; New York, NY 10038
- Region served: New York City
- Chief Executive Officer: Marco R. Damiani
- Website: www.ahrcnyc.org
- Formerly called: Association for the Help of Retarded Children

AHRC New York City is an organization serving people with intellectual and developmental disabilities in New York City. The initialism AHRC once stood for Association for the Help of Retarded Children. While the name is no longer used, the organization retained its four letters.

== History ==
AHRC New York City was founded in 1949 by Ann Greenberg and other parents of children with intellectual disabilities, who found the services available to their child inadequate. It was one of four initial chapters of NYSARC when the state organization was restructured in 1958, and the one associated with Greenberg and the other founders.

In 1954, AHRC New York City established the first sheltered workshop in the United States. Between 1959 and 1962, the AHRC established an Occupational Day Center (ODC) with a focus on community integration, in donated space formerly used for the Daughters of Israel Jewish orphanage. Out of this center emerged the country's first travel training program, later formalized under the New York City Department of Education.

== See also ==
- NYSARC
