= Herbert Lovett =

American psychologist

Herbert Lovett (1949–1998) was an American psychologist known for his contributions to the field of intellectual and developmental disabilities. He was an advocate for inclusive support and equal access to education, work, housing, and human rights for children and adults with disabilities.

== Education and career ==
Lovett received his education from Bowdoin College, Yale University, Harvard University, and the University of Rhode Island, where he earned his PhD in clinical psychology. He taught at the University of New Hampshire as a faculty member and traveled throughout the United States and other countries as a consultant to promote changes in the treatment and perception of individuals with behavioral difficulties. Lovett co-founded and served as the past president of the Autism National Committee, and advised People First of Ontario.

Lovett wrote two books, Cognitive Counseling and Persons with Special Needs (1985) and Learning to Listen: Positive Approaches and People with Difficult Behavior (1996).

=== Contributions ===
Lovett was an opponent of the use of punishment and aversive procedures in the treatment of individuals with autism and difficult behaviors, opposing the Behavioral Research Institute, which used these types of behavioral modification procedures. Lovett considered the failure to listen to be a significant factor leading to difficult behavior and argued that valuing people as people in a non-hypocritical manner was a prerequisite to effective support. He thought being guided by a "medical model" of care resulted in overlooking a person's communication and deeper motivations.

The Minnesota Governor's Council on Developmental Disabilities cites Lovett as one of a number of clinician-advocates who changed the focus of behavioral support for people with intellectual disabilities to prioritize communication. In 1991 Lovett summed up his approach "... the key variable in helping one another change is the mutuality of our relationships; how we cannot change others in a real way without ourselves in turn being changed; that difficult behaviors call us to listen to the person and to reflect what we need to change in our own lives and practices." Others working in the fields of autism and intellectual disabilities note Lovett's early contributions to establishing more person-centered care in the context of deinstitutionalization, and to positive behaviour support. With John O'Brien (advocate), Lovett co-wrote “Finding A Way Toward Everyday Lives,” a paper cited by others in the disabilities field as a significant reference point in the early development of person-centered planning.

== Bibliography ==
- Lovett, Herbert (1985). Cognitive Counseling and Persons with Special Needs. Human Sciences Press. ISBN 978-0-27591-651-0.
- Lovett, Herbert (1996). Learning to Listen: Positive Approaches and People with Difficult Behavior. Brookes Publishing. ISBN 978-1-55766-164-7.

== Personal life ==
Lovett was also a musician, writer, and community activist. He lived in South Boston with his partner, artist Michael Dowling, and died in February 1998 in a car accident.
