= Family caregivers in the United States =

In the United States, approximately 63 millions Americans provide unpaid care to an older adult or person with a chronic health condition. A 2012 report by the Alzheimer's Association states that 15 million of family caregivers are caring for a person with Alzheimer's disease or another dementia. The value of the voluntary, "unpaid" caregiving service provided by caregivers was estimated at $310 billion in 2006 — almost twice as much as was actually spent on home care and nursing services combined. By 2009, about 61.6 million caregivers were providing "unpaid" care at a value that had increased to an estimated $450 billion. It is projected that nearly one in five United States citizens will be 65 years of age or older by the year 2030. By 2050 this older population is expected to double in size.

== Family caregiver experience ==
=== Characteristics of caregivers ===
The average caregiver in the United States is 51 years old. Women make up the majority of the caregiver population. Of that majority, 61% identify as Non-Hispanic White individuals, compared to 16% identifying as Latino/a/e, 13% Black, and 6% Asian American, Native Hawaiian, and Pacific Islander. For caregivers that are older, the person they usually take care of are their spouses, while younger caregivers often care for older adults (e.g., their parents).

A 2011 survey of family caregivers in the United States found that almost half (46%) take on tasks that are traditionally considered "nursing" or "medical", such as injections, wound care, and operating medical equipment and monitors. While the family caregivers' assumption of such responsibilities is not new, the frequency may have increased over time due to shorter hospital stays, adults living longer with significant ailments, and technological and health care improvements allowing more nursing or medical care to be provided at home. This trend has implications for families, patients, family caregivers' workplaces, health care organizations, and insurers, including Medicare and Medicaid."

In 2005, 1.4 million children ages 8 to 18 provided care for an adult relative; 72% are caring for a parent or grandparent. Fortunately, most were not the sole caregiver.

=== Duration of care ===
Family caregivers in the U.S. provide an average of 5 years providing care to a loved one. They spend approximately 27 hours a week providing care. One third of caregivers anywhere from 21 hours to over 41 hours a week providing care.

=== Financial impact on family caregivers ===
Family caregivers often take time off from work and forego pay to spend an average of 47 hours per week with an affected loved one, especially if that person cannot be left alone. In a 2006 survey of patients with long-term care insurance, the direct and indirect costs of caring for an Alzheimer's disease patient averaged $77,500 per year in the United States.

=== Disparities among dementia family caregivers ===
Minoritized groups, such as African-American and Hispanic caregivers, experience unique challenges that can place them at higher risk for caregiver burden. They often provide more hours of care per week, and at a higher intensity. Additionally, caregiving duties in these communities tend to fall to a single primary caregiver.

African Americans face a more significant burden in Alzheimer's care management and will face more negative life changes and health outcomes due to providing care. African American caregivers are also less likely to seek help for grief and depression than their Caucasian counterparts.

African Americans are twice as likely to be diagnosed with dementia as other ethnic groups, and caregivers themselves often become secondary patients due to the severe impact of caregiving on their health and well-being. Additionally, according to the Alzheimer's Association and NAC/AARP, 60% of Alzheimer's disease and dementia caregivers are typically female and aged 55 or older. These figures underline the disproportionate impact of Alzheimer's disease and other forms of dementia on African American communities.

In addition, the Hispanic population tends to experience a higher prevalence of caregiver burden. Hispanic/Latino family caregiving can differ significantly from other populations for various reasons. The majority of Hispanic/Latino family caregivers are women in their 40s who provide care for a parent-in-law or other older individuals in the household. They are less inclined to use professional caregiving services compared to other populations, even though their caregiving situations are often highly intensive. According to a study, 63% of Hispanic/Latino caregivers reported high-burden caregiving situations, compared with 51% of non-Hispanic/Latino caregivers. Many Hispanic/Latino caregivers also report limited support, placing them at higher risk of burnout and distress. Additionally, existing studies lack a tailored and focused approach to the needs of Hispanic/Latino caregivers.

== See also ==
- Dementia caregiving
