= Travel training =

Educational instruction in travel skills

The Education of a "Non-Educable", 1962 brochure by the AHRC New York City with wayfinding signage.

Travel training or travel instruction refers to educational programs designed to instruct students with intellectual and developmental disabilities in urban wayfinding for the use of public transit. Travel training is generally described as "a program that provides instruction in travel skills to individuals with any disability except visual impairment." Beginning in the late 1950s as a part of the AHRC, the first travel training program was later formalized with the New York City Department of Education in the 1970s.

This approach, like the AHRC New York City from which it originated, is often associated with the Family Movement. Travel training offers transitional skills between that of activities of daily living for home and vocational education for work. Focusing on community integration, it has since spread through various independent programs internationally, serving a wide range of age groups.

== Origin in New York City ==
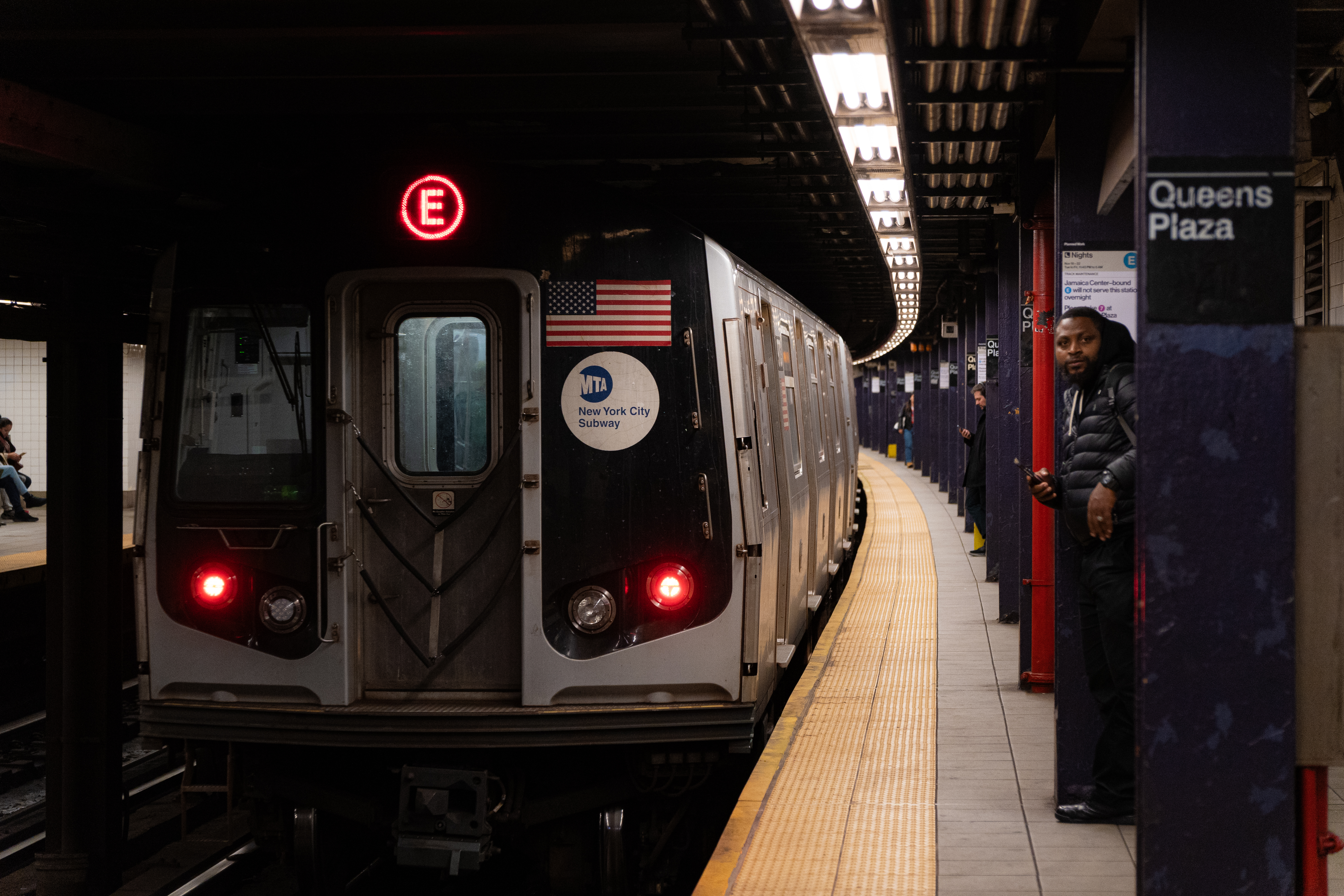
The New York City Subway is vital for commuting in the city.

Travel training emerged out of new studies done by the New York State Interdepartmental Health Resources Board which brought to light the many individuals living at home after graduation who were unable to take care of themselves, publishing their final report in 1959. New York City's high transit ridership meant that a specialized approach to mobility could be taken there.

In 1961, the NYC Board of Education established an Occupational Training Center (OTC) "to teach employment and social skills to students with moderate to severe developmental disabilities." It became clear that students were not utilizing the services as the city did not provide transportation to the centers, and the need for travel training was recognized.

With limited options available, parents began demanding greater resources and opportunities for their children. This movement was led by the AHRC, formed in 1949 as a parent-led organization to advocate for individuals with developmental disabilities. Between 1959 and 1962, the AHRC established an Occupational Day Center (ODC), designed to provide these opportunities. The focus of the ODC was on community integration rather than "independent living," and included assistance in travel training, self-care, remunerative work, and academic instruction. In 1961, the NYC Board of Education established an Occupational Training Center (OTC) "to teach employment and social skills to students with moderate to severe developmental disabilities."

Alongside the National Defense Education Act of 1958 and the Elementary and Secondary Education Act of 1965, as well as the Kennedy administration's allocation of funds for the education of people with intellectual disabilities, New York City public schools began to collaborate with the United States Office of Education's curriculum research project. In 1970, the New York City Department of Education established its formal Travel Training Program through the collaboration of the Bureau for Children with Retarded Mental Development (BCRMD) and the Bureau of Curriculum Research. Support for travel training increased in the 1990s with the American with Disabilities Act (ADA) and the Individuals with Disabilities Education Act (IDEA). The ADA mandated accessible public transit systems and paratransit services. The IDEA required public schools to provide transition services for students with disabilities.

This program has sustained the many transformations of the Department of Education in New York and today operates under Citywide District 75 serving special education students.

== Theory of travel training ==
Travel training instruction is conducted in a comprehensive and individualized manner by an instructor-guide. The ability to travel independently is dependent on the development of certain skill areas, and typically occurs in 13-15 days. According to Patricia J. Voorhees in an article from 1996, there are seven phases of instruction for people with cognitive disabilities. The program begins with an assessment:

Before travel training begins, a travel trainer determines a student's strengths and weaknesses, assesses how much support the student can expect from her or his parents or guardians, and reviews the travel route to determine the feasibility of traveling to a specific destination.

Peggy Groce, a pioneer of travel training and long-time director of the District 75 Office of Travel Training, writes:

Training in purposeful movement teaches a student fundamental skills, such as moving through a school building independently, using a telephone, carrying and using keys properly, asking for assistance, and becoming aware of the environment. This training occurs before actual travel training begins.

After the assessment, the student is introduced to the variables they will encounter along their specific travel route. Instructors will then observe the student to confirm their comprehension of these factors and skills. In phase three, students are confronted with potential emergency scenarios and ways to handle them. In the following stages, the specter of the instructor slowly disappears, plainclothes policemen and other travel instructors approach the students as strangers to test their knowledge of engagement. Finally, instructors only occasionally and covertly observe their students to ensure their success. This style of gradual release of responsibility training was initially opposed by concerned parents. However, the program had eventually proven itself, carefully selecting its first students to demonstrate the effectiveness of one-on-one training. Early descriptive reports of these first trainings in NY are available in the archive of Peggy Groce at the College of Staten Island.

The pedagogy of travel training developed greatly as a result of the collaboration of the BCRMD with the Bureau of Curriculum Research. From this collaborative work came the principle that life exists in "the home, community, community centers, and workplaces, and a meaningful life involves gaining dignity, participating in, and contributing to the surrounding community." The BCRMD program was noticeably different from that of the AHRC. The BCRMD curriculum "was characterized by its structured progression from simple, familiar scenarios to more complex and broader environments in alignment with the context of school life," and it emphasized task analysis and planning. The AHRC program was alternatively directed towards helping students gain employment.

== Spread ==
Since the 1970s, travel training has spread more widely, across the United States and beyond. With support from the Federal Transit Administration, the US charity Easterseals started Project Action in 1988 to begin to address the transportation divide by various means of increasing accessibility. After the passage of the Americans with Disabilities Act of 1990, further federal funding allowed travel training to be explored more widely, including in the San Francisco Bay Area. Easterseals' Project Action later began a Travel Trainer Certification Program across the United States, initiated after a 1997 study conducted with Western Michigan University researchers.

Travel training spread to the UK in the 2010s, with the publication of a guide by the Department for Transport in 2011. It has been adopted in various localities though contractors like the former HCT Group via a social impact bond and through public-private funders such as the Motability Foundation through its Traveling with Confidence grants. Efforts in the UK have also included programs for older adults.

The European Commission has supported research on travel training efforts across the continent through NICHES+, in coordination with POLIS, a regional network focused on active mobility.

The Special Needs School system in Japan also places an emphasis on travel training, usually teaching it to students at a younger age than in the United States.

== See also ==
- Paratransit
- Orientation and Mobility, service for those with visual impairment
