= Severe cognitive impairment =

Neurocognitive disorder

Severe cognitive impairment is a form of cognitive impairment that can be distinguished from the "mild" and "moderate" types of impairment. In the United States, the existence of severe cognitive impairment is a condition that triggers benefit payments under most long-term care insurance policies.

== Definition ==
Under the United States' Federal Long Term Care Insurance Program, a severe cognitive impairment is defined as "a deterioration or loss in intellectual capacity that
(a) places a person in jeopardy of harming him or herself or others and, therefore, the person requires substantial supervision by another person; and
(b) is measured by clinical evidence and standardized tests which reliably measure impairment in:
(1) short or long term memory;
(2) orientation to people, places or time; and
(3) deductive or abstract reasoning."

The Centers for Disease Control and Prevention offer the general explanation that a cognitive impairment exists when a person "has trouble remembering, learning new things, concentrating, or making decisions that affect their everyday life". It goes on the say that the impairment is severe when the person "[loses] the ability to understand the meaning or importance of something and the ability to talk or write". According to their explanation, people with severe cognitive impairment are unable to live independently.

== Prevalence ==
A 2013–2014 study conducted at nursing homes in Sweden found that approximately one in seven residents had that condition.

== See also ==
- Mild cognitive impairment
