= Our Voice Today =

- Editor: Ryan Goodenough
- Categories: Newsletter
- Frequency: Bi-Weekly
- Circulation: 2,000
- First issue: March 18, 1949
- Company: NYSARC, Inc.
- Based in: New York State
- Language: English
- Website: www.nysarc.org

Our Voice Today (OVT) is a bi-weekly publication of NYSARC, Inc. Originally published as print newsletter Our Children's Voice in March 1949, OVT has a long history of providing information and resources related to individuals with intellectual and other developmental disabilities.

== Goal ==
In 2011, OVT was converted into an e-newsletter with a circulation of about 2,000 subscribers. The goal of the publication is to keep individuals in New York State informed about the latest advancements in the field as well as the activities of the 55 Chapters of NYSARC.

In the 1970s, the publication reported on the effort to establish a separate Office of Mental Retardation in New York State. OVT also regularly reported on the National coverage that was being given to the deplorable conditions found at the Willowbrook State School. Willowbrook had been given National attention thanks to the media coverage of WABC, led by reporter Geraldo Rivera, and by the efforts of NYSARC, Inc.
