= Long-term care =

Services for the elderly or those with chronic illness or disability

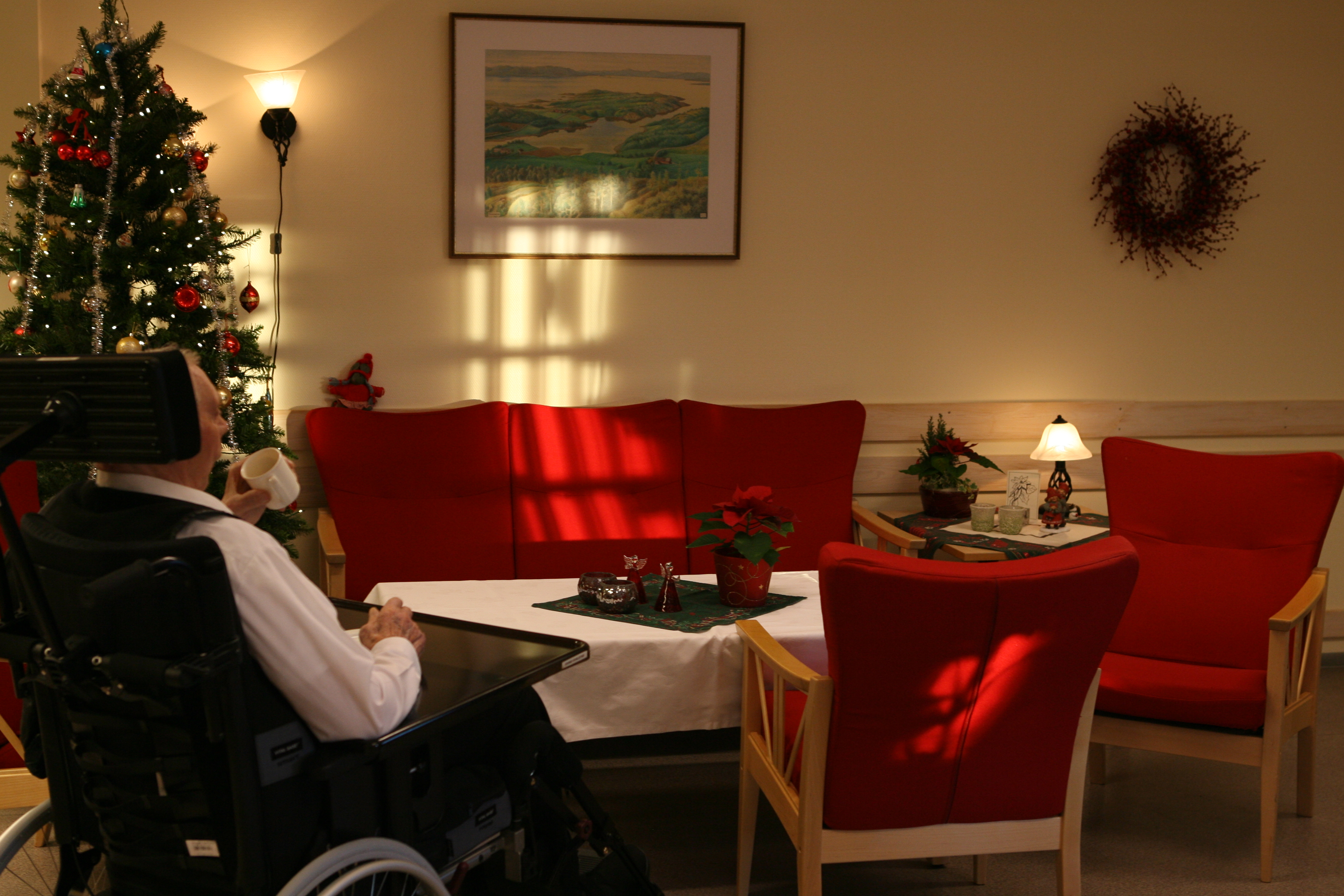
Elderly man at a nursing home in Norway

Long-term care (LTC) is a variety of services that help meet both the medical and non-medical needs of people with a chronic illness or disability who cannot care for themselves for long periods. Long-term care is focused on individualized and coordinated services that promote independence, maximize patients' quality of life, and meet patients' needs over a period of time.

Long-term care commonly provides custodial and non-skilled care, such as assisting with activities of daily living like dressing, feeding, using the bathroom, meal preparation, functional transfers and safe restroom use. Increasingly, long-term care involves providing a level of medical care that requires the expertise of skilled practitioners to address the multiple long-term conditions associated with older populations. Long-term care can be provided at home, in the community, in assisted living facilities or in nursing homes. Long-term care may be needed by people of any age, although it is a more commonly needed by senior citizens.

== Types of long-term care ==
Long-term care can be provided formally or informally. Facilities that offer formal LTC services typically provide living accommodation for people who require on-site delivery of around-the-clock supervised care, including professional health services, personal care, and services such as meals, laundry and housekeeping. These facilities may be known by various names, such as nursing homes, personal care facilities, residential continuing care facilities, etc. and are operated by different providers.

While the US government has been asked by the LTC (long-term care) industry not to bundle health, personal care, and services (e.g., meal, laundry, housekeeping) into large facilities, the government continues to approve that as the primary use of taxpayers' funds instead (e.g., new assisted living). Greater success has been achieved in areas such as supported housing which may still utilize older housing complexes or buildings or may have been part of new federal-state initiatives in the 2000s.

Long-term care provided formally in the home, also known as home health care, can incorporate a wide range of clinical services (e.g. nursing, drug therapy, physical therapy) and other activities such as physical construction (e.g. installing hydraulic lifts, renovating bathrooms and kitchens). These services are usually ordered by a physician or other professional. Depending on the country and nature of the health and social care system, some of the costs of these services may be covered by health insurance or long-term care insurance.

Modernized forms of long-term services and supports (LTSS), reimbursable by the government, are user-directed personal services, family-directed options, independent living services, benefits counseling, mental health companion services, family education, and even self-advocacy and employment, among others. In home services can be provided by personnel other than nurses and therapists, who do not install lifts, and belong to the long-term services and supports (LTSS) systems of the US.

Informal long-term home care is care and support provided by family members, friends and other unpaid volunteers. It is estimated that 90% of all home care is provided informally by a loved one without compensation and in 2015, families are seeking compensation from their government for caregiving.

== Long-term services and supports ==
"Long-term services and supports" (LTSS) is the modernized term for community services, which may obtain health care financing (e.g., home and community-based Medicaid waiver services), and may or may not be operated by the traditional hospital-medical system (e.g., physicians, nurses, nurse's aides).

The Consortium of Citizens with Disabilities (CCD) which works with the U. S. Congress, has indicated that while hospitals offer acute care, many non-acute, long-term services are provided to assist individuals to live and participate in the community. An example is the group home international emblem of community living and deinstitutionalization, and the variety of supportive services (e.g., supported housing, supported employment, supported living, supported parenting, family support), supported education.

The term is also common with aging groups, such as the American Association of Retired Persons (AARP), which annually surveys the US states on services for elders (e.g., intermediate care facilities, assisted living, home-delivered meals). The new US Support Workforce includes the Direct Support Professional, which is largely non-profit or for-profit, and the governmental workforces, often unionized, in the communities in US states. Core competencies (Racino-Lakin, 1988) at the federal-state interface for the aides "in institutions and communities" were identified in aging and physical disabilities, intellectual and developmental disabilities, and behavioral ("mental health") health in 2013 (Larson, Sedlezky, Hewitt, & Blakeway, 2014).

President Barack Obama, US House Speaker John Boehner, Minority Leader Nancy Pelosi, Majority Leader Harry Reid, and Minority Leader Mitch McConnell received copies of the US Senate Commission on Long Term Care on the "issues of service delivery, workforce and financing which have challenged policymakers for decades" (Chernof & Warshawsky, 2013). The new Commission envisions a "comprehensive financing model balancing private and public financing to insure catastrophic expenses, encourage savings and insurance for more immediate LTSS (Long Term Services and Supports) costs, and to provide a safety net for those without resources."

The direct care workforce envisioned by the MDs (physicians, prepared by a medical school, subsequently licensed for practice) in America (who did not develop the community service systems, and serve different, valued roles within it) were described in 2013 as: personal care aides (20%), home health aides (23%), nursing assistants (37%), and independent providers (20%) (p. 10). The US has varying and competing health care systems, and hospitals have adopted a model to transfer "community funds into hospital"; in addition, "hospital studies" indicate M-LTSS (managed long-term care services) as billable services. In addition, allied health personnel preparation have formed the bulk of the preparation in specialized science and disability centers which theoretically and practically supports modernized personal assistance services across population groups and "managed" behavioral health care "as a subset of" mental health services.

Long-term services and supports (LTSS) legislation was developed, as were the community services and personnel, to address the needs of "individuals with disabilities" for whom the state governments were litigated against, and in many cases, required to report regularly on the development of a community-based system. These LTSS options originally bore such categorical services as residential and vocational rehabilitation or habilitation, family care or foster family care, small intermediate care facilities, "group homes", and later supported employment, clinics, family support, supportive living, and day services (Smith & Racino, 1988 for the US governments).The original state departments were Intellectual and Developmental Disabilities, Offices of Mental Health, lead designations in Departments of Health in brain injury for communities, and then, Alcohol and Substance Abuse dedicated state agencies.

Among the government and Executive initiatives were the development of supportive living internationally, new models in supportive housing (or even more sophisticated housing and health), and creative plans permeating the literature on independent living, user-directed categories (approved by US Centers for Medicaid and Medicare), expansion of home services and family support, and assisted living facilities for the aging groups. These services often have undergone a revolution in payment schemes beginning with systems for payment of valued community options. then termed evidence-based practices.

Interventions for preventing delirium in older people in institutional long-term care

The current evidence suggests that software-based interventions to identify medications that could contribute to delirium risk and recommend a pharmacist's medication review probably reduces incidence of delirium in older adults in long-term care. The benefits of hydration reminders and education on risk factors and care homes' solutions for reducing delirium is still uncertain.

Physical rehabilitation for older people in long-term care

Physical rehabilitation can prevent deterioration in health and activities of daily living among care home residents. The current evidence suggests benefits to physical health from participating in different types of physical rehabilitation to improve daily living, strength, flexibility, balance, mood, memory, exercise tolerance, fear of falling, injuries, and death. It may be both safe and effective in improving physical and possibly mental state, while reducing disability with few adverse events.

The current body of evidence suggests that physical rehabilitation may be effective for long-term care residents in reducing disability with few adverse events. However, there is insufficient to conclude whether the beneficial effects are sustainable and cost-effective. The findings are based on moderate quality evidence.

== Demand for long-term care ==
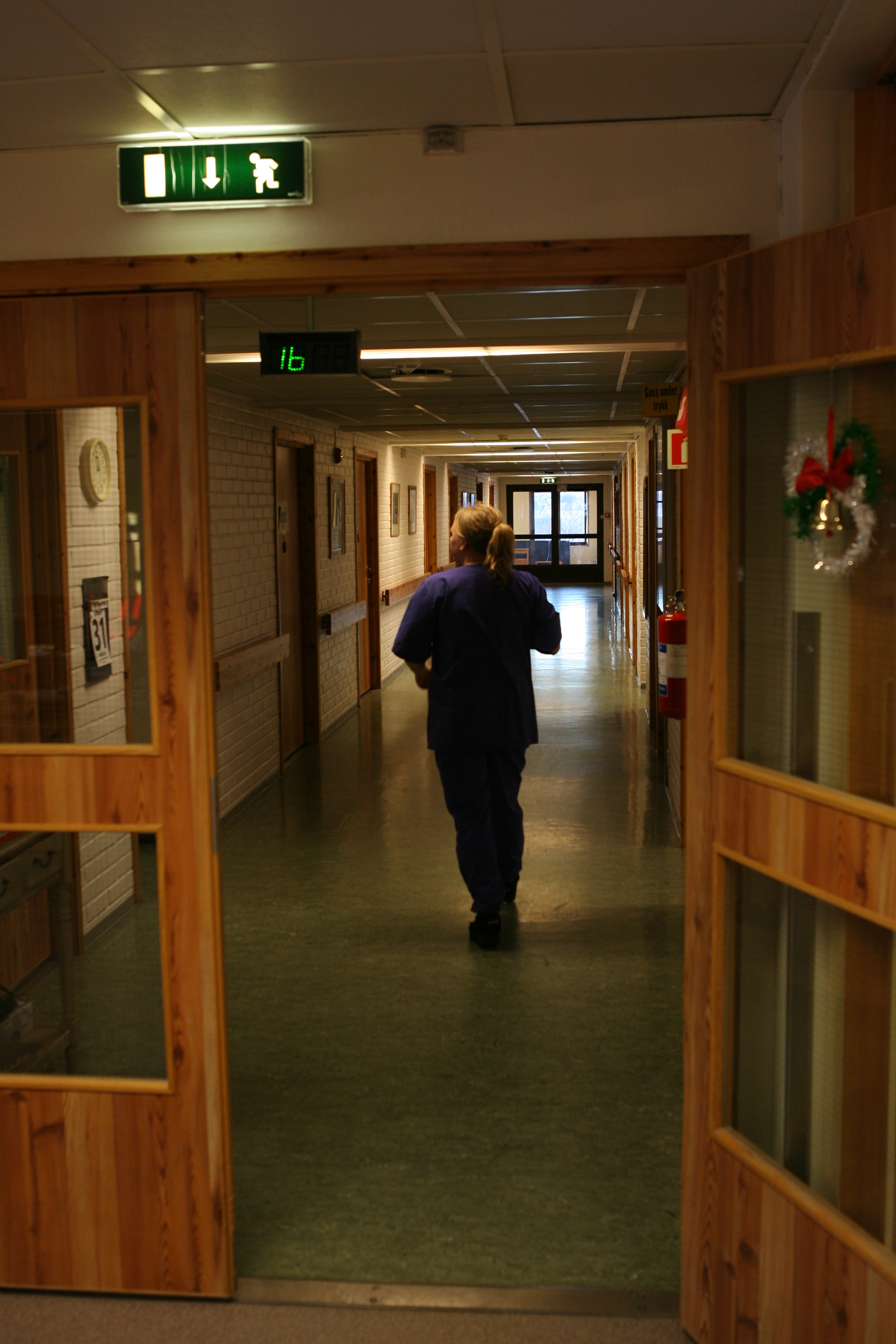
Nurse at a nursing home in Norway

Life expectancy is going up in most countries, meaning more people are living longer and entering an age when they may need care. Meanwhile, birth rates are generally falling. Globally, 70 percent of all older people now live in low or middle-income countries. Countries and health care systems need to find innovative and sustainable ways to cope with the demographic shift. As reported by John Beard, director of the World Health Organization's Department of Ageing and Life Course, "With the rapid ageing of populations, finding the right model for long-term care becomes more and more urgent."

The demographic shift is also being accompanied by changing social patterns, including smaller families, different residential patterns, and increased female labour force participation. These factors often contribute to an increased need for paid care.

In many countries, the largest percentages of older persons needing LTC services still rely on informal home care, or services provided by unpaid caregivers (usually nonprofessional family members, friends or other volunteers). Estimates from the OECD of these figures often are in the 80 to 90 percent range; for example, in Austria, 80 percent of all older citizens. The similar figure for dependent elders in Spain is 82.2 percent.

The US Centers for Medicare and Medicaid Services estimates that about 9 million American men and women over the age of 65 needed long-term care in 2006, with the number expected to jump to 27 million by 2050. It is anticipated that most will be cared for at home; family and friends are the sole caregivers for 70 percent of the elderly. A study by the U.S. Department of Health and Human Services says that four out of every ten people who reach age 65 will enter a nursing home at some point in their lives. Roughly 10 percent of the people who enter a nursing home will stay there five years or more.

Based on projections of needs in long-term care (LTC), the US 1980s demonstrations of versions of Nursing Homes Without Walls (Senator Lombardi of New York) for elders in the US were popular, but limited: On LOK, PACE, Channeling, Section 222 Homemaker, ACCESS Medicaid-Medicare, and new Social Day Care. The major argument for the new services was cost savings based upon reduction of institutionalization. The demonstrations were significant in developing and integrating personal care, transportation, homemaking/meals, nursing/medical, emotional support, help with finances, and informal caregiving. Weasart concluded that: "Increased life satisfaction appears to be relatively consistent benefit of community care" and that a "prospective budgeting model" of home and community-based long-term care (LTC) used "break-even costs" to prevent institutional care.

== Long-term care costs ==
A recent analysis indicates that Americans spent $219.9 billion on long-term care services for the elderly in 2012. Nursing home spending accounts for the majority of long-term care expenditures, but the proportion of home and community based care expenditures has increased over the past 25 years. The US federal-state-local government systems have supported the creation of modernized health care options, though new intergovernmental barriers continue to exist.

The Medicaid and Medicare health care systems in the US are relatively young, celebrating 50 years in 2015. According to the Health Care Financing Review (Fall 2000), its history includes a 1967 expansion of to ensure primary and preventive services to Medicaid-eligible children (EPSDT), the use home and community-based Medicaid waivers (then HCBS services), Clinton administration health care demonstrations (under 1115 waiver authority), the new era of SCHIP to cover uninsured children and families, coverage for the HIV/AIDS population groups, and attention to ethnic and racial-based service delivery (e.g., beneficiaries). Later, managed care plans which used "intensive residential children's" options and "non-traditional out-patients services (school-based services, partial hospitalization, in-home treatment and case management) developed "behavioral health care plans".

In 2019, the average annual cost of nursing home care in the United States was $102,200 for a private room. The average annual cost for assisted living was $48,612. Home health care, based on a 44 average week, cost $52,654 a year Genworth 2019 Cost of Care Survey]. The average cost of a nursing home for one year is more than the typical family has saved for retirement in a 401(k) or an IRA. As of 2014, 26 states have contracts with managed care organizations (MCO) to deliver long-term care for the elderly and individuals with disabilities. The states pay a monthly capitated rate per member to the MCOs that provide comprehensive care and accept the risk of managing total costs.

When the percentage of elderly individuals in the population rises to nearly 14% in 2040 as predicted, a huge strain will be put on caregivers' finances as well as continuing care retirement facilities and nursing homes because demand will increase dramatically. New options for elders during the era of choice expansion (e.g., seniors helping seniors, home companions), which includes limitations on physician choices, assisted living facilities, retirement communities with disability access indicators, and new "aging in place" plans (e.g., aging in a group home, or "transfer" to a home or support services with siblings upon parents' deaths-intellectual and developmental disabilities).

Politically, the 21st Century has shifted to the cost of unpaid family caregiving (valued by AARP in aging at $450 billion in 2009), and the governments in the US are being asked to "foot part of the bill or costs" of caregiving for family members in home. This movement, based in part on feminist trends in the workplace, has intersected with other hospital to home, home health care and visiting nurses, user-directed services, and even hospice care. The government's Medicaid programs is considered the primary payer of Long Term Services and Supports (LTSS), according to the American Association of Retired Persons, Public Policy Institute. New trends in family support and family caregiving also affect diverse disability population groups, including the very young children and young adults, and are expected to be high increases in Alzheimer's due to longevity past age 85.

== Long-term care funding ==
Governments around the world have responded to growing long-term care needs to different degrees and at different levels. These responses by governments, are based in part, upon a public policy research agenda on long-term care which includes special population research, flexible models of services, and managed care models to control escalating costs and high private pay rates.

=== Europe ===
Most Western European countries have put in place a mechanism to fund formal care and, in a number of Northern and Continental European countries, arrangements exist to at least partially fund informal care as well. Some countries have had publicly organized funding arrangements in place for many years: the Netherlands adopted the Exceptional Medical Expenses Act (ABWZ) in 1967, and in 1988 Norway established a framework for municipal payments to informal caregivers (in certain instances making them municipal employees). Other countries have only recently put in place comprehensive national programs: in 2004, for example, France set up a specific insurance fund for dependent older people and in 2006, Portugal created a public funded national network for long-term care. Some countries (Spain and Italy in Southern Europe, Poland and Hungary in Central Europe) have not yet established comprehensive national programs, relying on informal caregivers combined with a fragmented mix of formal services that varies in quality and by location.

In the 1980s, some Nordic countries began making payments to informal caregivers, with Norway and Denmark allowing relatives and neighbors who were providing regular home care to become municipal employees, complete with regular pension benefits. In Finland, informal caregivers received a fixed fee from municipalities as well as pension payments. In the 1990s, a number of countries with social health insurance (Austria in 1994, Germany in 1996, Luxembourg in 1999) began providing a cash payment to service recipients, who could then use those funds to pay informal caregivers.

In Germany, funding for long-term care is covered through a mandatory insurance scheme (or Pflegeversicherung), with contributions divided equally between the insured and their employers. The scheme covers the care needs of people who as a consequence of illness or disability are unable to live independently for a period of at least six months. Most beneficiaries stay at home (69%). The country's LTC fund may also make pension contributions if an informal caregiver works more than 14 hours per week.

Major reform initiatives in health care systems in Europe are based, in part on an extension of user-directed services demonstrations and approvals in the US (e.g., Cash and counseling demonstrations and evaluations). Clare Ungerson, a professor of Social Policy, together with Susan Yeandle, Professor of Sociology, reported on the Cash for Care Demonstrations in Nation-States in Europe (Austria, France, Italy, Netherlands, England, Germany) with a comparative USA ("paradigm of home and community care").

In addition, direct payment schemes were developed and implemented in the UK, including in Scotland, for parents with children with disabilities and people with mental health problems. These "health care schemes" on the commodification of care were compared to individualised planning and direct funding in the US and Canada.

=== North America ===
==== Canada ====
In Canada, facility-based long-term care is not publicly insured under the Canada Health Act in the same way as hospital and physician services. Funding for LTC facilities is governed by the provinces and territories, which varies across the country in terms of the range of services offered and the cost coverage. In Canada, from April 1, 2013, to March 31, 2014, there were 1,519 long-term care facilities housing 149,488 residents.

Canada-US have a long-term relationship as border neighbors on health care; however, Canada, has a national health care system in which providers remain in private practice but payment is covered by taxpayers, instead of individuals or numerous commercial insurance companies. In the development of home and community-based services, individualised services and supports were popular in both Nations. The Canadian citations of US projects included the cash assistance programs in family support in the US, in the context of individual and family support services for children with significant needs. In contrast, the US initiatives in health care in that period involved the Medicaid waiver authority and health care demonstrations, and the use of state demonstration funds separate from the federal programs.

==== United States ====
Long-term care is typically funded using a combination of sources including but not limited to family members, Medicaid, long-term care insurance and Medicare. All of these include out-of-pocket spending, which often becomes exhausted once an individual requires more medical attention throughout the aging process and might need in-home care or be admitted into a nursing home. For many people, out-of-pocket spending for long-term care is a transitional state before eventually being covered by Medicaid, which requires impoverishment for eligibility. Personal savings can be difficult to manage and budget and often deplete rapidly. In addition to personal savings, individuals can also rely on an Individual retirement account, Roth IRA, Pension, Severance package or the funds of family members. These are essentially retirement packages that become available to the individual once certain requirements have been met.

In 2008, Medicaid and Medicare accounted for approximately 71% of national long-term care spending in the United States. Out-of-pocket spending accounted for 18% of national long-term care spending, private long-term care insurance accounted for 7%, and other organizations and agencies accounted for the remaining expenses. Moreover, 67% of all nursing home residents used Medicaid as their primary source of payment.

Private Long-Term Care Insurance in 2017 paid over $9.2 Billion in benefits and claims for these policies continue to grow. The largest claim to one person is reported to be over $2 million in benefits

Medicaid is one of the dominant players in the nation's long-term care market because there is a failure of private insurance and Medicare to pay for expensive long-term care services, such as nursing homes. For instance, 34% of Medicaid was spent on long-term care services in 2002.

Medicaid operates as distinct programs which involve home and community-based (Medicaid) waivers designed for special population groups during deinstitutionalization then to community, direct medical services for individuals who meet low income guidelines (held stable with the Affordable Care Act Health Care Exchanges), facility development programs (e.g., intermediate care facilities for individuals with intellectual and developmental disabilities), and additional reimbursements for specified services or beds in facilities (e.g., over 63% beds in nursing facilities). Medicaid also fund traditional home health services and is payor of adult day care services. Currently, the US Centers for Medicaid and Medicare also have a user-directed option of services previously part of grey market industry.

In the US, Medicaid is a government program that will pay for certain health services and nursing home care for older people (once their assets are depleted). In most states, Medicaid also pays for some long-term care services at home and in the community. Eligibility and covered services vary from state to state. Most often, eligibility is based on income and personal resources. Individuals eligible for Medicaid are eligible for community services, such as home health, but governments have not adequately funded this option for elders who wish to remain in their homes after extended illness aging in place, and Medicaid's expenses are primarily concentrated on nursing home care operated by the hospital-nursing industry in the US.

Generally, Medicare does not pay for long-term care. Medicare pays only for medically necessary skilled nursing facility or home health care. However, certain conditions must be met for Medicare to pay for even those types of care. The services must be ordered by a doctor and tend to be rehabilitative in nature. Medicare specifically will not pay for custodial and non-skilled care. Medicare will typically cover only 100 skilled nursing days following a 3-day admission to a hospital.

A 2006 study conducted by AARP found that most Americans are unaware of the costs associated with long-term care and overestimate the amount that government programs such as Medicare will pay. The US government plans for individuals to have care from family, similar to Depression days; however, AARP reports annually on the Long-term services and supports (LTSS) for aging in the US including home-delivered meals (from senior center sites) and its advocacy for caregiving payments to family caregivers.

Long-term care insurance protects individuals from asset depletion and includes a range of benefits with varying lengths of time. This type of insurance is designed to protect policyholders from the costs of long-term care services, and policies are determined using an "experience rating" and charge higher premiums for higher-risk individuals who have a greater chance of becoming ill.

There are now a number of different types of long-term care insurance plans including traditional tax-qualified, partnership plans (providing additional dollar-for-dollar asset protect offered by most states), short-term extended care policies and hybrid plans (life or annuity policies with riders to pay for long-term care).

Residents of LTC facilities may have certain legal rights, including a Red Cross ombudsperson, depending on the location of the facility.

Unfortunately, government funded aid meant for long-term care recipients are sometimes misused. The New York Times explains how some of the businesses offering long-term care are misusing the loopholes in the newly redesigned New York Medicaid program. Government resists progressive oversight which involves continuing education requirements, community services administration with quality-of-life indicators, evidence-based services, and leadership in use of federal and state funds for the benefit of individual and their family.

For those that are poor and elderly, long-term care becomes even more challenging. Often, these individuals are categorized as "dual eligibles" and they qualify for both Medicare and Medicaid. These individuals accounted for 319.5 billion in health care spending in 2011.

==== Japan ====
Japan’s public long-term care insurance system, introduced in 2000, is financed equally by insurance premiums and public funds. Residents aged 40 and over pay premiums. Public funding is shared by the national, prefectural and municipal governments. People aged 65 and over may qualify based on assessed care needs; those aged 40–64 qualify when their need is due to specified age-related diseases.

== See also ==
- Activities of daily living
- AMDA – The Society for Post-Acute and Long-Term Care Medicine
- Assisted living
- Caring for people with dementia
- Chronic condition
- Dynamic treatment regime
- Family support
- Geriatric care management
- Home care
- List of companies operating nursing homes in the United States
- Long-term care insurance
- Options counseling
- Transgenerational design
