= Life Care Funding =

Life Care Funding / LCX LIFE / LifeCare Xchange
- Industry: Health care, Financing
- Founded: 2007
- Founder: Chris Orestis
- Headquarters: Portland, Maine
- Services: Long-term care funding

Life Care Funding, is an American financial, senior care advisory and life settlement company based in Portland, Maine and now operates as LCX LIFE. The company works with seniors to help them access funding solutions to pay for senior living and long-term care, and specializes in settling life insurance policies into Long Term Care funds for customers who cannot afford long-term care. The company was founded by Chris Orestis in 2007. Life Care Funding has contributed to legislation reform to help middle-class people to obtain funding for long-term care.

== History ==
Life Care Funding was founded in 2007 by CEO Chris Orestis, a life insurance industry lobbyist, senior care expert and advocate. The company works with Life Settlements to convert life insurance life insurance policies into long-term care benefit funds.

The company focuses on the use of life settlements as a tax-free vehicle for seniors to pay for Long-Term Care through the creation of an LTC-HSA. What has become known as a “Long-Term Care Benefit Plan”, is now an accepted form of payment for Senior Care services with every care provider in the United States. The Long-Term Care Benefit is funded through the life settlement of a life insurance policy and then paid into an FDIC insured account which sends monthly, tax-free payments to a long-term care provider.

The company is headquartered in Maine and has affiliated offices around the country.

== Legislation reform ==
Seniors with a life insurance policy are not eligible for Medicaid. Orestis created a model for middle-class people to pay for long-term care when they cannot pay out of pocket or through Medicaid. He made legislation reform recommendations based on his model to the federal Commission on Long-Term Care.

Life Care Funding worked with the National Conference of Insurance Legislators (NCOIL), the Florida Medicaid Department, the Florida and Texas Health Care Associations, AARP, the insurance industry and life settlement industry to develop private pay funding options that Medicaid would qualify as a spend-down. Orestis has testified before the National Conference of Insurance Legislators' (NCOIL), state legislatures and special commissions of Florida, Texas, New Jersey, Louisiana, and Maine, and contributed to the report of the Congressional Commission on Long-Term Care. In 2013, eight states introduced the Medicaid Life Settlement legislation to encourage use of private pay conversions of life insurance policies into long-term care benefit plans. By 2015, thirteen states had introduced the legislation and two states had passed it into law. State regulatory bodies are working to pass a model disclosure law which will require that policy owners be informed of their legal right to convert their policy's death benefit for use toward long-term care. Legislation that allows seniors to pay for long-term care through the sale of life insurance policies rather than through Medicaid payments both lower Medicaid bills and increase access to needed care.

== See also ==
- Life insurance
- Life settlement
- Chris Orestis
