= The Arc New York =

Organization serving people with developmental disabilities

- Formation: 1949
- Type: Non-Profit
- Legal status: 501(c)(3)
- Purpose: Human Services/Developmental Disabilities
- Headquarters: Delmar, NY
- Region served: New York State
- Staff: 30,000 (est.)
- Website: www.thearcny.org

The Arc New York (previously known as the NYSARC) is the largest organization serving people with developmental disabilities. A non-profit, The Arc New York serves over 60,000 people with intellectual and other developmental disabilities through its 55 chapters in New York state. The Arc New York is an affiliated member of Arc of the United States.

== History ==
In 1949, two Bronx mothers placed an advertisement in the New York Post with an interest in establishing a day nursery for their young children. Over 200 New York City parents responded and banded together to fight for the recognition of their children's special needs and capabilities.

A committee was appointed to draft a constitution for a new, single organization. The Arc New York was formally incorporated in February 1949.

In March of the same year, new committees were formed to address specific issues such as education, legal affairs, fundraising, and public relations. That same month, the Organization published the first issue of "Our Children's Voice" which later became "Our Voice Today." It was designed to communicate with other parents and families.

The Arc New York model has since served as an organizational model that has been duplicated across the nation. In the years since its founding, the Organization has grown rapidly as a service provider and advocacy organization.

The Arc New York partners with Camp Loyal Town, Advantage Care Diagnostic and Treatment Center, Brookville Center for Children's Services, the AHRC Foundation and Fay J. Linder Center for Autism and Developmental Disabilities.

== Mission ==
The Arc New York's mission is to improve the quality of life for persons with intellectual and other developmental disabilities by:

- Being the preferred place for support, information, direction, and services for persons with intellectual and other developmental disabilities;
- Having the best in service delivery;
- Speaking with one clear voice in all matters;
- Becoming a learning organization by building training and educational opportunities into all aspects of The Arc New York operations.

== Chapters ==
Central Region

- Broome-Tioga-Chenango: Achieve
- Chemung: Chemung ARC
- Delaware: The Arc of Delaware County
- Herkimer: HARC
- Jefferson: Jefferson Rehabilitation Center
- Madison-Cortland: Madison Cortland ARC
- Oneida-Lewis: The Arc, Oneida Lewis, NYSARC
- Onondaga: Onondaga Arc
- Oswego: The ARC of Oswego
- Otsego: The Arc Otsego
- Rome Tri-County: Rome DC ARC
- St-Lawrence: St. Lawrence NYSARC

Northeast Region

- Albany: New Visions
- Clinton: Clinton ARC
- Columbia: COARC
- Essex: Mountain Lake Services
- Franklin-Hamilton: The Adirondack Arc
- Fulton: Lexington Center
- Montgomery: Liberty Arc
- Rensselaer: The Arc of Rensselaer County
- Saratoga: Saratoga Bridges
- Schenectady: Schenectady ARC
- Schoharie: Schoharie County ARC
- Warren-Washington: Warren Washington ARC

Southeast Region

- Staten Island: Benevolent Society
- Bronx: Bronx DC ARC
- Wassaic: Community Leaque Wassaic DC ARC
- Dutchess: Dutchess ARC
- Nassau: AHRC Nassau
- New York City: AHRC New York City
- Orange: Orange County AHRC
- Putnam: PARC
- Rockland: ARC of Rockland
- Suffolk: AHRC Suffolk
- Sullivan: Sullivan Arc
- Ulster-Greene: Ulster-Greene ARC
- Letchworth Village: Welfare League DC ARC
- Westchester: Westchester Arc

Western Region

- Allegany: Allegany Arc
- Cattaraugus: The ReHabilitation Center
- Chautauqua: The Resource Center
- Erie: Heritage Centers
- Genesee: Genesee ARC
- Livingston-Wyoming: Livingston Wyoming Arc
- Monroe: The Arc of Monroe County
- Niagara: Opportunities Unlimited
- Ontario: Ontario ARC
- Orleans: The Arc of Orleans County
- Schuyler: The Arc of Schuyler
- Seneca-Cayuga: Seneca-Cayuga Arc
- Steuben: The Arc of Steuben
- Wayne: The Arc of Wayne
- West Seneca: West Seneca DC ARC
- Yates: The Arc of Yates

== Services ==
The Arc New York's 55 chapters provide a variety of services, including:

- Advocacy

Support offered on behalf of a family or individual.

- Children's Services

Services from birth through school age including diagnosis, evaluation, treatment, and education.

- Clinic

Clinical services and/or primary health care.

- Day Service

Activities that combine diagnostic, therapeutic, rehabilitative, pre-vocational, vocational, and employment services.

- Guardianship

Planning alternative granting of legal authority.

- Recreation

Day, evening, weekend, or overnight programs that provide leisure and social activities.

- Residential

Support services to enable living as independently as possible in the community.

- Support

Assistance in accessing needed services, programs and supports.

- Waiver

A flexible group of supports and services.

== Trust services ==
The Arc New York currently offers 3 types of trust programs:

- The Arc New York Trust

The Arc New York Trust consists of two active funds. The Unrestricted Fund allows parents, relatives, and friends to leave large sums of money or property to help a person with a developmental disability. Funds can be transferred during the Grantor's life or at death. The Exempt Fund primarily benefits and supports the Arc New York Corporate Guardianship Program.

- The Arc New York Community Trusts

The Community Trusts are pooled trusts which qualify as Supplemental Needs Trusts for people with disabilities as described under Social Security Law Section 1614(a)(3)[42 USC 1382c(a)(3)]. They are funded with the personal assets of the person with disabilities.

Community Trust II is designed for individuals who have monthly income in excess of the Medicaid qualification levels.

Community Trust I and III are primarily for individuals receiving government benefits, like Supplemental Security Income or Medicaid. Community Trust III is solely for individuals with a large sum greater than $250,000.

- The Arc New York Individual Trust

The Arc New York Individual Trust offers both Trustee and administrative services for first- and third-party Supplemental Needs Trusts. Like the Community Trusts, the Individual Trust is open to people who have any disabilities listed under Security Law Section 1614(a)(3)[42 USC 1382c(a)(3)].
