= COARC =

US non-profit organization

COARC is a 501(c)(3) non-profit organization and the Columbia County, New York, chapter of NYSARC, Inc. It was established in 1965 by a small group of Columbia County parents and interested community members to educate children who experienced developmental disabilities.

== Mission ==
Its mission is to expand abilities, one person at a time, so individuals experiencing disabilities can achieve their individual goals. COARC offers person centered planning, programs and services to 500 individuals who experience disabilities. These include Residential and Living Alternatives, Vocational and Employment Services, Contract Manufacturing, Day Activity Programs, Service Coordination, Advocacy and Legal Services, Children's Services, Recreation Opportunities, At-Home and Respite Services and Traumatic Brain Injury Services. COARC is supported through state and federal funding, membership and contributions from individuals, businesses and foundations. It is headquartered in Mellenville, New York, United States.
