= Family Movement =

Disability rights advocacy group

The Family Movement, also known in the past as the Parent Movement, is an arm of the disability rights movement, a larger social movement. The Family Movement advocates for the economic and social rights of family members with a disability. Key elements include: social inclusion; active participation; a life of meaning; safety; economic security; accessibility and self-determination. The family movement has been critical in closing institutions and other segregated facilities; promoting inclusive education; reforming adult guardianship to the current supported decision-making; increasing access to health care; developing real jobs; fighting stereotypes and reducing discrimination.

== The Parent/Family Arm of the Disability Movement ==
In the late 1940s and early 1950s families spontaneously across Canada, the US, England, France, Scandinavia, Australia and New Zealand began asserting a different vision, a different lifestyle and a different future for their sons and daughters with intellectual disabilities, mental handicaps and developmental disabilities. These isolated, independent developments eventually coalesced into the first wave of the 'parent movement'. They organized and demanded services for their sons and daughters. Their efforts eventually resulted in the UN Declaration on the Rights of Disabled Persons, December 9, 1975. (Note: while this terminology is not used today it was the commonly accepted terminology 6 or 7 decades ago.) This has subsequently been eclipsed by the UN Convention on the Rights of Persons with Disabilities which was equally influenced by the emerging and now very strong consumer 'independent living' arm of the disability movement.

Families around the world began to question if they should institutionalize their child with a disability. Parents were isolated from each other and had no way of knowing if anybody else agreed with them. As a result of this, it was not easy for parents to get to know each other back then. Some resorted to placing ads in newspapers. Here, they faced challenges as some newspapers felt it was inappropriate to advertise that you had a child with a disability.

As they started coming together families began to create opportunities, programs and supports for their sons and daughters. They created programs with few resources. Taking over church basements to set up schools; borrowing chalk, discarded books from school boards who would not accept educational responsibility for educating their sons and daughters.

These parents and their community supporters formed the Associations for Retarded Children. These organizations are now called Associations for Community Living in Canada. Following their example organizations for people with cerebral palsy (concurrent time period of the Arc), hearing and visual impairments, autism and other handicapping conditions were started. Parents were also involved as parent-professional partners at university centers, and were given additional funds to begin cross-disability offices, and even family support agencies with preferential hiring practices.

Three famous Americans (two parents and one brother) had a major impact on public perceptions of disability in the 1950s and 1960s. One was Nobel Prize winner Pearl Buck who wrote about her daughter Carol in the book The Child Who Never Grew. The other was Dale Evans who starred with her husband Roy Rogers in a popular television western wrote Angel Unaware about her daughter with Down syndrome. The third was President John F. Kennedy, whose sister Rosemary had a mental handicap. In 1961 he launched the President's Panel on Mental Retardation which became the President's Committee on Mental Retardation. These three combined with the work of parents and family members brought the issue out of the closet, eased the stigma of having a child with a disability and became a major source of hope for families.

In 1961 the International League of Societies for the Mentally Handicapped was formed. This organization is now called Inclusion International.

The UN Declaration on the Rights of Disabled Persons was adopted by the United Nations General Assembly on December 9, 1975.

One of the most important contributions to the parent/family movement was the introduction of the concept of Normalization (people with disabilities). Originating in Denmark with Erik Bank-Mikkelsen and Bengt Nirjeit normalization principles were adapted in North America by Wolf Wolfensberger. Dr. Wolfensberger fully supported families, and to some extent, parental control in decisionmaking. Wolfensberger wrote his seminal work in Toronto in the early 1970s as a visiting scholar to the Canadian Association for the Mentally Retarded and the National Institute on Mental Retardation – the national bodies for the local parent founded organizations. Wolfensberger's theory is now called Social Role Valorisation.

Eventually with persistence, patience and ingenuity the government funded system of social, educational and health programs and services took shape.

By the 1980s the parent/family movement had successfully established a comprehensive program and service infrastructure which was court-mandated in some states and developed through major state and regional governmental offices. It was natural for them to support their sons and daughters who were creating their own movements, including the Independent Living movement which had strong roots in the 1970s laws (e.g., Rehabilitation Act of 1973) and self-advocacy movement which obtained university parent-professional support in its inception.

== Timeline ==
=== British Columbia ===
- 1952 – establishment of Vancouver Association for Retarded Children
- 1955 – establishment of BC Association for Retarded Children by seven local parent associations. Now called the BC Association for Community Living.
- 1958 – Canadian Association for Retarded Children founded (now Canadian Association for Community Living –CACL)
- 1981 – International Year of Disabled Persons
- 1982 – Stephen Dawson Supreme Court case establishes right of children with disabilities to receive medical care
- 1984 – Tranquille blockade
- 1985 – closure of Tranquille Institution
- 1986 – Family Support Institute founded
- 1987 – Closure of world's largest state-supported institution: Willowbrook State School, Staten Island New York
- 1988 – First Federal Election recognizing the rights of people with developmental disabilities to vote
- 1988 – Establishment of BC Self Advocacy Foundation
- 1989 – Establishment of Planned Lifetime Advocacy Network (PLAN)
- 1992 – Barb Goode first self advocate to address the United Nations General assembly
- 1993 – new Adult Guardianship legislation
- 1996 – closure of Glendale Institution
- 1996 – closure of Woodlands Institution
- 2000 – establishment of Representation Agreement Act – first statute in the world to accept caring trusting relationships as a criterion for determining legal capability
- 2004 – Establishment of CLBC – Crown Corporation

=== North America ===
- 1949 – The AHRC New York City was founded.
- 2008 – F.A.M.I.L.Y Movement in Chicago founded.
