= Planning Alternative Tomorrows with Hope =

Person-centred planning process (1993-)

Planning Alternative Tomorrows with Hope (PATH) is a strengths-based person-centred planning process developed by John O'Brien, Marsha Forest and Jack Pearpoint. The PATH process is designed to help a focus person establish their own vision for their life and imagine what supports and connections will help them achieve this vision.

== Description ==
PATH is a strengths-based person-centred planning process developed by John O'Brien, Marsha Forest and Jack Pearpoint, who also developed the McGill Action Planning System (MAPS). The PATH process is designed to help a focus person establish their own vision for their life and imagine what supports and connections will help them achieve this vision. Unlike other person-centred planning processes, PATH is also intended to be a community-building opportunity, and is not limited to existing service systems. The focus person chooses persons from their circles of support who are invited to their PATH meetings, and it is encouraged to include not only service providers but also those who share a common identity or culture with the focus person. PATH is designed to develop a comprehensive plan and goals to work towards. In PATH, a service plan is only the response of one of the parties for how they can contribute toward the focus person's vision for their life. PATH includes and stresses documentation and structures of accountability, since follow through by support persons is essential for client wellbeing. It is especially suited for situations where all participants are already familiar with the focus person, since it does not include information gathering components.

PATH is one of the main person-centred planning tools in use, along with Essential Lifestyle Planning, personal futures planning, Individual Service Design, Making Actions Happen (MAP), circles of support, Group Action Planning (GAP), and the McGill Action Planning System (MAPS).

== PATH implementation steps ==
1. Form a team
2. Determine desired outcome
3. Arrange a facilitator
4. Assure participation of the person whose future is being planned
5. Hold the session
6. Follow up

== PATH planning session steps ==
The PATH steps proceed backwards from an ideal future, steadily working from toward concrete actions. This is unique among PCP approaches

1. Imagine your dream, that reflects your ideals, identity, and values
2. Choose your focus for the upcoming year.
3. Where are you at now?
4. Identify people to enroll on the journey
5. Recognize ways to build strength
6. Chart actions for the next few months
7. Plan the next three months
8. Commit to the first step

== Reception ==
PATH is popular partially because of the wealth of resources available PATH has been adapted for use in classrooms with the group being classmates, or potentially including parents. There are many books which use PATH in school environments. PATH has been implemented in many countries including Canada, Italy, New Zealand, the United Kingdom, and the United States.

== See also ==
- Person-centred planning
- Wellness Recovery Action Plan
