= Options counseling =

In human services, options counseling or long-term support options counseling is a person-centered service for older individuals, persons with disabilities, or their caregivers. It is defined as "an interactive decision-support process whereby consumers, family members and/or significant others are supported in their deliberations to determine appropriate long-term care choices in the context of the consumer’s needs, preferences, values, and individual circumstances."
