= Direct support professional =

Employed caregivers of people with intellectual disabilities

Direct Support Professionals (DSPs) are professionals who work directly with people with intellectual and developmental disabilities, with the aim of assisting the individual to become integrated into their community or the least restrictive environment.

DSPs share similar job duties with professional caregivers; they may assist with activities of daily living, transportation, ambulatory transfers, medication assistance under a delegating nurse, food preparation, and other as-needed duties. Given the possible challenging behaviors displayed by some individuals with developmental disabilities, including self-injurious and assaultive behavior, DSPs may also have experience in de-escalation and positive behavior support. However, their job broadly centers around assisting their clients to lead their most independent, autonomous, and socially participatory lives. A DSP provides support with community integration, competitive integrated employment, and acts as an advocate in communicating the wants, needs, and goals of the disabled individuals that they work for.

== Duties ==
DSPs work directly with individuals. This means they'll often spend extended hours in the home or care facilities of their clients, and help provide day-to-day care with activities such as showering, toileting, eating, traveling, scheduling appointments, handling finances, taking medications, and more. The client is encouraged and expected to do all of these things to the best of their ability. Moreover, DSPs are not the guardians or medical professionals of the clients, and must defer to the expertise and opinions of those legally responsible for aspects of the client's life, including the client.

According to the National Alliance for Direct Support Professionals, "(t)he job duties of a DSP may resemble those of teachers, nurses, social workers, counselors, physical or occupational therapists, dieticians, chauffeurs, personal trainers, and others." The United States Department of Labor lists DSP duties as supporting engagement with the community, using creative thinking for accommodations to help people with disabilities be more independent, providing caregiving and support with activities of daily living, working with the people they support to advocate for rights and services, and providing emotional support.

Much of the emphasis on autonomy and independence came from the public outcry against overcrowded and underfunded institutions for the developmentally disabled, intellectually disabled, and mentally ill. Scandals such as the "last great disgrace" of the Willowbrook State School fueled the disability rights movement for self-advocacy and community living.

== Standards of care ==
In 2010, the United States Department of Labor established a federal standard for DSP apprenticeship. Still, the standards of each organization are unique. College experience is unnecessary, but many employers require a high school diploma or GED. Some employers require certifications, while others offer certifying training on the job. The organization may require DSPs to become licensed in first aid, right response, nursing assistant registered, nursing assistant certified, home care aide, and more relevant healthcare-related certifications. DSPs may also be required by their company to carry a valid driver's license with a clean driver's record.

Before hiring, employers may require background checks, drug tests, mental health tests, physical exams, and other screening procedures to determine the competency of a potential candidate.

== See also ==
- Caregiver
- Friendly caller program
