= Wolf Wolfensberger =

German American academic (1934–2011)

- Born: 1934; Mannheim, Germany
- Died: 27 February 2011 (aged 76–77); Syracuse, New York
- Education: B.A., philosophy, Siena College, 1955; M.A., psychology and education, Saint Louis University, 1957; Ph.D., psychology, George Peabody College for Teachers, 1962
- Occupations: Professor of Special Education and Director of the Training Institute for Human Service Planning, Leadership and Change Agentry at Syracuse University
- Years active: 1957–2011
- Known for: disability rights advocacy, normalization principle, social role valorization
- Notable work: The Principle of Normalization in Human Services (1972)
- Spouse: Nancy Artz Wolfensberger
- Children: Margaret Sager, Joan Wolfensberger, Paul Wolfensberger
- Parent(s): Friedrich and Helene Wolfensberger

Wolf Peregrin Joachim Wolfensberger, Ph.D. (1934–2011) was a German American academic who influenced disability policy and practice through his development of North American normalization and social role valorization (SRV). SRV extended the work of his colleague Bengt Nirje in Europe on the normalization of people with disabilities. He later extended his approach in a radical anti-deathmaking direction: he spoke about the Nazi death camps and their targeting of disabled people, and contemporary practices which contribute to deathmaking.

== Early life ==
Born in Mannheim, Germany, in 1934, Wolfensberger was sent to the countryside during World War II, in order to escape the bombing. He emigrated to the US in 1950 at 16 years of age.

== Education ==
He studied philosophy at Siena College in Memphis, Tennessee, received a Master of Arts in clinical psychology at St. Louis University, and a PhD in psychology from Peabody College for Teachers (now part of Vanderbilt University), where he specialized in mental retardation and special education.

== Career ==
Wolfensberger worked at Muscatatuck State School, Indiana ("state school" was a term for US institutions for people with intellectual disabilities) and interned at the E.R. Johnstone Training Center, Bordentown, New Jersey. He did a one-year National Institute of Health research fellowship (1962–1963) at Maudsley Hospital, (London, England), studying with Jack Tizard and Neil O'Connor. Wolfensberger was the director of research (1963–1964) at Plymouth State Home and Training School (Michigan). He was an intellectual disability research scientist at the Nebraska Psychiatric Institute of the University of Nebraska Medical School in Omaha from 1964 to 1971.

Between 1971 and 1973, he was a visiting scholar at the National Institute on Mental Retardation in Toronto, Canada, and was the director of the Training Institute for Human Service Planning, Leadership and Change Agentry at Syracuse University in upstate New York until his death in 2011. He was a friend and colleague of the School of Education at Syracuse University, and supported the awarding of PhDs, "community services" contributions throughout the US and worldwide, and lent support to federal projects such as Rehabilitation Research and Training Center on Community Integration (1985–1995, to Steven J. Taylor, also Professor Emeritus) for which he was not compensated.

== See also ==
- Normalization principle
- Social role valorization

== Bibliography ==
=== Works by Wolfensberger ===
Books

- Kugel, Robert B.; Wolfensberger, Wolf (1969). "Changing Patterns in Residential Services for the Mentally Retarded". Books: Wolfensberger Collection. Washington, D.C.: President's Committee on Mental Retardation.
- Wolfensberger, Wolf (1972). The Principle of Normalization in Human Services. Toronto, Ont.: National Institute on Mental Retardation. ISBN 9780969043843.
- Wolfensberger, Wolf P. (1977). A Multi-Component Advocacy/Protection Schema. Toronto, Ont.: Canadian Association for the Mentally Intellectually disabled.
- Wolfensberger, W. (1998). A brief introduction to Social Role Valorization: A high-order concept for addressing the plight of societally devalued people, and for structuring human services. (3rd ed.). Syracuse, NY: Training Institute for Human Service Planning, Leadership and Change Agentry (Syracuse University).
- Wolfensberger, W. (2005). The new genocide of disabled & affected people (3rd (rev) ed.). Syracuse, NY: Syracuse University Training Institute for Human Service Planning, Leadership & Change Agentry.
- Wolfensberger, W., & Zauha, H. (1973). Citizen Advocacy And Protective Services For The Impaired And Handicapped. Toronto: National Institute on Intellectual disability.
- Wolfensberger, W., & Glenn, L. (1975, reprinted 1978). Program Analysis of Service Systems (PASS): A method for the quantitative evaluation of human services: (3rd ed.). Handbook. Field Manual. Toronto: National Institute on Mental Retardation.
- Wolfensberger, W. & Thomas, S. (2007). PASSING: A tool for analyzing service quality according to Social Role Valorization criteria. Ratings manual (3rd rev. ed.). Syracuse, NY: Syracuse University Training Institute for Human Service Planning, Leadership & Change Agentry.

Academic journal articles

- Wolfensberger, Wolf (February 1991). "Reflections on a Lifetime in Human Services and Mental Retardation". Mental Retardation. 29 (1). American Association on Intellectual and Developmental Disabilities: 1–15. PMID 2017046.
- Wolfensberger, W., Thomas, S., & Caruso, G. (1996). Some of the universal "good things of life" which the implementation of Social Role Valorization can be expected to make more accessible to devalued people. SRV/VRS: The International Social Role Valorization Journal/La Revue Internationale de la Valorisation des Roles Sociaux, 2(2), 12–14.

=== Secondary sources ===
- Bersani, Jr., Hank (2001). "Wolf Wolfensberger: Scholar, Change Agent, and Iconoclast". Journal of Religion, Disability & Health. 4 (2–3). American Association on Intellectual and Developmental Disabilities: 1–9. doi:10.1300/J095v04n02_01. S2CID 147586108.
- Bleasdale, Michael (1994). "Deconstructing Social Role Valorization". Interaction. 7 (4): 16–22.
- Bleasdale, Michael (1996). "Evaluating 'Values': A Critique of Value Theory in Social Role Valorization". Australian Disability Review (1). Disability Advisory Council of Australia: 3–22.
- Gaventa, William C.; Coulter, David, eds. (2001). The Theological Voice of Wolf Wolfensberger. Binghamton, NY: Haworth Pastoral Press. ISBN 0-7890-1314-2.
- Heller, H. William; Spooner, Fred; Schilit, Jeffrey; Enright, Brian E.; Haney, Kay (June 1991). "Classic Articles: A Reflection into the Field of Mental Retardation". Education and Training in Mental Retardation. 26 (2). Council for Exception Children, Division on Autism and Development Disabilities: 202–206. JSTOR 23878589.
- Kristiansen, Kristjana; Traustadóttir, Rannveig (2011). "In Memoriam: Wolf Wolfensberger (1934-2011)". Scandinavian Journal of Disability Research. 13 (2). Nordic Network on Disability Research: 167–168. doi:10.1080/15017419.2011.579492.
- Mann, Glenys; van Kraayenoorda, Christa (2011). "The Influence of Wolf Wolfensberger and His Ideas". International Journal of Disability, Development and Education. 58 (3). Routledge: 203–211. doi:10.1080/1034912X.2011.598374. S2CID 144111840.
- Williams, Paul (July 2011). "A Tribute to Wolf Wolfensberger". The British Journal of Developmental Disabilities. 57 (113). British Society of Developmental Disabilities: 109–116. doi:10.1179/096979511798967115. S2CID 143542413.

David Race (editor) (2003) Leadership and Change in Human Services: Selected Reading from Wolf Wolfensberger. New York: Routledge. David Race (2006) Social Role Valorization and the English Experience. London: Whiting and Birch.
