= Long-term care insurance =

Insurance which pays monthly for nursing home or assisted-living care

Long-term care insurance (LTC or LTCI) is an insurance product, sold in the United States, United Kingdom, Canada and Germany that helps pay for the costs associated with long-term care. Long-term care insurance covers care generally not covered by health insurance, Medicare, or Medicaid.

Individuals who require long-term care are generally not sick in the traditional sense, but are unable to perform two of the six activities of daily living (ADLs) such as dressing, bathing, eating, toileting, continence, transferring (getting in and out of a bed or chair), and walking.

Age is not a determining factor in needing long-term care. While about 70 percent of US individuals over 65 will require at least some type of long-term care services during their lifetime, about 40% of those receiving long-term care are between 18 and 64. Once a change of health occurs, long-term care insurance may not be available in the US. Early onset (before 65) Alzheimer's and Parkinson's disease occur relatively rarely.

Long-term care is an issue, because people are living longer. As people age, many times they need help with everyday activities of daily living or require supervision due to severe cognitive impairment. That impacts women relatively more since as of 2016, they often lived longer than men and, by default, become caregivers to others.

== Benefits ==
Long-term care insurance can cover home care, assisted living, adult daycare, respite care, hospice care, nursing home, Alzheimer's facilities, and home modification to accommodate disabilities. If home care coverage is purchased, long-term care insurance can pay for home care, often from the first day it is needed. It will pay for a visiting or live-in caregiver, companion, housekeeper, therapist or private duty nurse up to seven days a week, 24 hours a day up to the policy benefit maximum. Many experts suggest shopping between the ages of 45 and 55 as part of an overall retirement plan to protect assets from the high costs and burdens of extended health care.

Other benefits of long-term care insurance:

- Many individuals may feel uncomfortable relying on their children or family members for support, and find that long-term care insurance could help cover out-of-pocket expenses. Without long-term care insurance, the cost of providing these services may quickly deplete the savings of the individual and/or their family. The costs of long-term care differ by region. The U.S. government has an interactive map to estimate the costs by state.
- Premiums paid on a long-term care insurance product may be eligible for an income tax deduction. The amount of the deduction depends on the age of the covered person. Benefits paid from a long-term care contract are generally excluded from income. Some states also have deductions or credits and proceeds are always tax-free.
- Business deductions of premiums are determined by the type of business. Generally corporations paying premiums for an employee are 100% deductible if not included in employee's taxable income.

In the United States, as of 2017 Medicaid provided long-term care services for the poor or those who spend-down or and exhaust their assets. In most states, you must spend down to $2000. If there is a living spouse/partner they may keep an additional amount.

A welfare program, Medicaid does provide medically necessary services for people with limited resources who "need nursing home care but can stay at home with special community care services." However, Medicaid generally does not cover long-term care provided in a home setting unless there is a state specific waiver program. In most states Medicaid does not pay for Assisted Living. People who need long-term care often prefer to age in place in their own home or in a private room in an assisted living facility if medically necessary.

== Types of policies ==
As of 2010, private long-term care (LTC) insurance was growing in popularity in the United States and premiums, have risen dramatically even for existing policyholders. Coverage costs can be expensive, when consumers wait until retirement age to purchase LTC coverage.

As they relate to U.S. policies, two types of long-term care policies offered are:

- Traditional policies are the most common policies offered. Traditional policy premiums, like automobile insurance premiums, are paid on a continual basis. If unused, no premiums are returned. However, if the policy has a "return of premium" rider, a death benefit will be paid to a beneficiary if the insured dies at a time when benefits received under the policy are less than the premiums paid to the insurer. The amount of the benefit is equal to the excess of premiums paid over benefits received.
- Combination or hybrid policies are a combination of life insurance or an annuity with long-term care insurance. Several varieties of these combinations exist.

As they relate to U.S. income tax, two types of long-term care policies offered are:

- Tax qualified (TQ) policies are the most common policies offered. A TQ policy requires that a person 1) be expected to require care for at least 90 days, and be unable to perform 2 or more activities of daily living (eating, dressing, bathing, transferring, toileting, continence) without substantial assistance (hands-on or standby); or 2) for at least 90 days, need substantial assistance due to a severe cognitive impairment. In either case, a doctor must provide a plan of care. Benefits from a TQ policy are non-taxable.
- Non-tax qualified (NTQ) was formerly called traditional long-term care insurance. It often includes a "trigger" called a "medical necessity" trigger. This means that the patient's own doctor, or that doctor in conjunction with someone from the insurance company, can state that the patient needs care for any medical reason and the policy will pay. NTQ policies include walking as an activity of daily living and usually only require the inability to perform 1 or more activity of daily living. The Treasury Department has not clarified the status of benefits received under a non-qualified long-term care insurance plan. Therefore, the taxability of these benefits is open to further interpretation. This means that it is possible that individuals who receive benefits under a non-qualified long-term care insurance policy risk facing a large tax bill for these benefits.

Fewer non-tax qualified policies are available for sale. One reason is that consumers want to be eligible for the tax deductions available when buying a tax-qualified policy. The tax issues can be more complex than the issue of deductions alone, and it is advisable to seek good counsel on all the pros and cons of a tax-qualified policy versus a non-tax-qualified policy, since the benefit triggers on a good non-tax-qualified policy are better. By law, tax-qualified policies carry restrictions on when the policy holder can receive benefits. One survey found that sixty-five percent of purchasers did not know whether or not the policy they bought was tax qualified.

Once a person purchases a policy, the language cannot be changed by the insurance company, and the policy usually is guaranteed renewable for life. It can never be canceled by the insurance company for health reasons, but can be canceled for non-payment.

Most benefits are paid on a reimbursement basis and a few companies offer indemnity-based per-diem benefits at a higher rate. Most policies cover care only in the continental United States. Policies that cover care in select foreign countries usually only cover nursing care and do so at a rated benefit.

Group policies may have provisions for non-restricted or open enrollment periods and underwriting may be required. Group plans may or may not be guaranteed renewable or tax qualified. Some group plans include language allowing the insurance company to replace the policy with a similar policy and to change the premiums at that time. Some group plans can be canceled by the insurance company. To compensate for the higher insurance risk group plans may have higher deductibles and lower benefits than individual plans. Some group plans have a 3 ADL (activities of daily living) requirement for nursing care.

The Consolidated Omnibus Budget Reconciliation Act (COBRA) provides certain former employees, retirees, spouses, former spouses, and dependent children the right to temporary continuation of health coverage at group rates.

Retirement systems such as CalPERS may offer long-term care insurance similar to a group plan. These organizations are not regulated by the state insurance departments. They can increase rates and make changes to policies without state scrutiny and approval.

Long-term care insurance rates are determined by six main factors: the person's age, the daily (or monthly) benefit, how long the benefits pay, the elimination period, inflation protection, and the health rating (preferred, standard, sub-standard). Most companies will offer couples and multi-life discounts on individual policies. Some companies define "couples" not only to spouses, but also to two people who meet criteria for living together in a committed relationship and sharing basic living expenses. The average age of purchasers has dropped from 68 years in 1990 to 61 years in 2005, and the number of purchasers who are under age 65 has increased significantly.

Most companies offer multiple premium payment modes: annual, semi-annual, quarterly, and monthly. Companies may add a percentage for more frequent payment than annual. Options such as spousal survivorship, non-forfeiture, restoration of benefits and return of premium are available with most plans.

The Deficit Reduction Act of 2005 makes Partnership plans available to all states. Partnership provides "lifetime asset protection" from the Medicaid spend-down requirement. As of March 2014, 41 states had active Long Term Care Insurance Partnership programs.

== Benefit eligibility and deductibles ==
Most policies pay benefits when the policyholder needs help with two or more of six ADLs or when a cognitive impairment is present. According to the US Department of Health and Human Services all tax-qualified long-term care insurance plans have the same trigger.

Most policies have an elimination period or waiting period similar to a deductible. This is the period of time that you pay for care before your benefits are paid. Elimination days may be from 30 to 120 days after a long-term care incident, such as a fall or illness. Some policies require intended claimants to provide proof of 30 to 120 service days of paid care before any benefits will be paid. In some cases, the option may be available to select zero elimination days when covered services are provided in the home in accordance with a Plan of Care. A policyholder can select a maximum daily or monthly benefit. This is the maximum the insurance company will pay toward care on either a daily or monthly basis.

== Comparisons ==
=== Canada ===
LTC Insurance riders generally available in Canadian policies include: ROPD – Return of premium on death, which means the premiums are returned to the person's estate and protection from inflation, which means the policy benefit grows at a set rate of return.

=== Germany ===
Germany has two different kinds of longterm care insurance: a mandatory care insurance and a voluntary, private care insurance. The German laws oblige the people to have a basic care insurance. It is one of five mandatory insurances, the others are health, accident, unemployment and pension insurance. As usual in the German public insurance system costs are evenly split between employers and employees.

There are three types of private care insurance:

- The most expensive form of private care insurance is like a life insurance. It pays you a monthly pension when the insured needs to be taken care of, no matter what the care actually costs. When making the contract you can choose how much the insurance pays each month, depending on the care level.
- Another form of private care insurance pays a certain percentage of the actual cost after the mandatory care insurance has paid. Here you can decide on the percentage that is being paid, depending on the care level. The advantage of this type of insurance is that it pays more money when the care costs more, so the risk of raised prices is lower for the insured.
- The most common type of private care insurance pays a certain amount of money for each day where the insured is being taken care of.

=== Japan ===
Japan introduced a public long-term care insurance system in 2000, with people aged 40 and older contributing to its financing. Municipalities administer the system, and people certified as needing care can use facility, in-home, and community-based services according to their assessed needs. The number of people certified as needing care or support rose from 2.18 million at the end of April 2000 to 7.10 million at the end of April 2024. In fiscal year 2025, the ministry recorded 6.852 million annual actual recipients of preventive and long-term-care services, 1.4% more than in fiscal year 2024.

=== United States ===
Some 7 million individuals have some form of long-term care insurance. The vast majority have what is referred to as traditional, or health-based, LTC insurance. The opposite is true for new policy sales. Some 350,000 new policies are sold each year with 84 percent being linked-benefit or life insurance policies that include an LTC benefit.

In the U.S., the nation's long-term care insurance companies paid out a record $11 billion in claims in 2019 to some 310,000 policyholders.

A new study projects that the lifetime chance of long-term care insurance policy usage. Someone purchasing coverage at age 65 has a 50% likelihood of using their policy benefits, especially when there is no elimination period for home care benefits.

== See also ==
- Activities of daily living
- CLASS Act
- Continuing Care Retirement Community
- Health insurance in the United States
- Long Term Care Benefit Plan
