= Social role valorization =

Social role valorization (SRV) is a method for improving the lives of people who are of low status in society. (In countries of the British commonwealth, the third word in the term is usually spelled valorisation, but the abbreviation is the same.)

SRV is applicable to people who for any reason are disadvantaged, discriminated against, marginalized, and otherwise consigned to low status in their society. This includes those who are poor, of a devalued or despised racial, ethnic, religious, or political group, with any kind of bodily or mental impairment, who are elderly where youth is highly valued, who have few or unwanted skills, who are imprisoned, are illegal and unwanted immigrants, are seriously, chronically, or terminally ill, are disordered or unorthodox in their sexual identity and conduct, or otherwise violate important societal values. The great majority of members of these classes receive either formal or informal services, provided by families, schools, hospitals, welfare agencies, etc. SRV is relevant to any kind of human service, in the fields of education, rehabilitation, psychology, social work, medicine, imprisonment/corrections, and so on.

SRV was formulated in 1983 by Wolf Wolfensberger. He developed SRV as his successor to the earlier "Principle of Normalization in Human Services," which originated in Scandinavia in the early 1960s (Nirje, 1969). He went on to promulgate SRV throughout North America, as well as in England, France, and Australasia.

The International SRV Association was formed in 2013 to promote social role valorization (SRV) development, education, assessment, and leadership to assist people and organizations to implement SRV concepts so that vulnerable people may have access to the good things in life.

== See also ==
- Normalisation (people with disabilities)
- Wolf Wolfensberger
- Community integration
