= Community integration =

Program for individuals with disabilities to participate in community activities

Community integration, while diversely defined, is a term encompassing the full participation of all people in community life. It has specifically referred to the integration of people with disabilities into American society from the local to the national level, and for decades was a defining agenda in countries such as Great Britain. Throughout recent decades, community integration programs have been increasingly effective in improving healthcare access for people with disabilities. They have been valued for providing a "voice for the voiceless".

In the United States, the Consortium of Citizens for Disabilities advocates for a national public policy that "ensures the self-determination, independence, empowerment, integration, and inclusion of children and adults with disabilities in all parts of society". Some countries, such as Canada, cite inclusion as the primary consideration: the unifying, global agenda in "disability and community life".

== Theory ==
From the lens of special education, theorists have defined types of integration as physical, functional, social, community, and organizational. Within social networks in support of people with disabilities, community integration signifies opportunities for participation in schools, careers, homes, relationships, leisure, and a variety of interests and lifestyles. Bengt Nirje and the late Wolf Wolfensberger are internationally regarded for their concepts of normalization and social role valorization, with a particular emphasis on physical and social integration. Anders Gustavsson (c. 1990) specified that "physical integration" best describes the common use of the term "integration," while "social integration" applied to the struggle for equality and quality in life.

The original intent of community integration was to promote the participation of people with disabilities in typical or public environments, in contrast to exclusionary practices such as the minority-group model. As the field has shifted in favor of community support, theories related to community living have begun to require applicability beyond a minority-group model with a new emphasis on self-determination. Racino has described these theories to include ecological theory, community-support theories, systems theory, feminist theories, family theories, sociocultural theories, critical theories in education, psychosocial theories, the generic human-concept theory, and universal theories.

== Systems change ==
Taylor, in his analysis of community systems in the US, proposed the principle of the non-restrictive environment as a counterpoint to the federal government's least-restrictive-environment principle. As of 2014, the governing principle in the United States was that of the most integrated setting based upon the Supreme Court Olmstead Decision.

Before the Olmstead decision, the Supreme Court addressed community integration multiple times in Halderman v. Pennhurst State School and Hospital, a class action case filed in Pennsylvania by attorney David Ferleger. Although the Olmstead decision did not explicitly address the constitutional issues decided in the Pennhurst case and similar, limitations in Olmstead have been critiqued and it has been argued that there is a constitutional right to community services.

Broader systemic change in support of community integration faces challenges in consideration of local public agencies, agreement on strategic approaches (e.g., enabling leadership, putting people first, values and vision, learning for quality), and the implications for national policy. Disability agency, state-level disability systems, community, and societal change are essential (but insufficient) elements of the process and outcomes of community integration.

As community integration is strongly rooted in societal participation, it has wide application and presence across many community practice fields, including community psychology and sociology, inclusive education in local school systems, competitive businesses (with rehabilitation), rural independent living, urban sociology, local parks and recreation programs, community development, housing, and neighbourhoods.

=== Education ===
Community integration in an educational setting is of historical and modern significance, described as "more comprehensive than academic mainstreaming". In an educational context, community integration refers to opportunities "to learn practical social and community living skills in a wide variety of community settings". Based in part on the Civil rights movement as represented by Brown v. Board of Education, school integration focused on the right to free and appropriate education.

Educational integration is often equated with inclusion and remains controversial (although legally supported) in the United States partly due to special-education systems. School integration often applies to children with more significant support needs, such as those requiring assistive technology. There is general acceptance and support at the post-secondary level in almost all populations, as many colleges have developed disability services departments. Instead of educational integration, the goal is for continued school reform through inclusion (education) and for education with legally-mandated accommodations.

=== Housing ===
In the field of accessibility and support services for people with disabilities in the United States, the once-popular group- and facility-based models have shifted to homes with support services, emphasizing a change from "home-like" housing to community homes, neighbourhoods, and relationships. Homeownership is an example of community integration that also empowers individuals. Housing integration advocates for high-quality affordable housing which often includes analyses of social exclusion which may concentrate on US-protected classes.

The context of housing integration in the United States has significance due to the country's history of racial and class-based residential segregation. The academic study of this type of segregation continues to be relevant within ethnic, social, and economic frameworks, including studies of desegregation, gentrification, and hyper segregation. In particular, redlining affects housing and neighborhood integration by gerrymandering voting districts to promote or devalue community development funds. A discussion of residential segregation in the United States and Europe and a "critique of the ideal of integration" can be found in Inclusion and Democracy.

In the United States, mixed-income and scattered-site housing were reported in a case study of a housing association supporting people with disabilities in Madison, Wisconsin (the Madison Mutual Housing Association and Cooperative). In Canada, the Prairie Housing Cooperative (as reported by David Wetherow) creates housing opportunities for people with disabilities. An early review on nonprofit housing in the United States and Canada indicated that mixed-income housing was used primarily in "troubled neighbourhoods" with efforts to seek higher-income tenants to move into those neighbourhoods as opposed to raising the entire group's living standards. In 2013, the emphasis was on inclusive and sustainable housing, while other groups supported equitable and sustainable housing in the United States. The status of housing and disability in the United States was reported by the National Council on Disability, and compared to Harvard University's report on the nation's housing.

=== Recreation ===
Being in the community has meant being part of local activities and events in towns, cities, and suburbs. Recreational integration is one facet of inclusion and community access. School-and-recreation integration was promoted in the US, Canada, and Australia. On the local level, concerns have included acceptance and friendships, support services, site accessibility, group size, and "truly integrated" (in contrast to side-by-side) activities; in Great Britain, for example, community opportunities were sought for people to belong, contribute and make friends. Recreational funding has also often been tied to facilities, and community integration involves staffing changes in environments such as the YMCA.

Recreational inclusion may be a camp, a neighborhood center, a girls' softball league, school sports or technology clubs, a community choir, or a public-speaking course as integrated social participation. Auto-related examples include an amusement-park car track; car shows, bike nights and car cruise-ins, and model-car racing.

=== Employment ===
Employment integration was advocated during the 1970s for women, people with disabilities, and racial groups, who were seen as discriminated against in employment (Racino for the Urban League of Onondaga County, Inc., 1978); for example, occupations and professions were constructed based upon gender: women's professions (nurses, teachers, secretaries) and men's professions (scientists, managers, administrators, police, firemen, and construction). Progress has been made at the leadership level with the first African American president (Barack Obama), disability leadership in the United States Department of Education (Judith Heumann), and the rise of prominent women in the State Department (Madeleine Albright and Hillary Clinton).

For those with severe disabilities, employment-integration initiatives were often framed as supported employment, which allowed jobs at regular businesses and employment sites. Similar initiatives in the mental health field were often called transitional employment, and other forms of integration included competitive placements in businesses and industry, targeted positions, and even affirmative businesses in the hearts of business districts. A major success was the passage of the Americans with Disabilities Act of 1990, amended in 2008 (following the Rehabilitation Act of 1973, amended in 1978), which protected men and women with disabilities in obtaining jobs, careers, and positions with necessary workplace accommodations. A key service for employment integration is often considered to be personal assistance services, or in other fields a job coach before more "natural" models of supervision and support.

In this context employment integration has been conceptualized, including social aspects of promotion, discriminatory hiring and termination practices, performance standards, job-sharing and modification, educational attainment, internships and volunteer experiences, workplace relationships, team-building, supervisory roles, workers' compensation, accommodations, and supports (Urban League of Onondaga County, 1978). Competitive employment integration in the US workplace is expected by law, and categorical services have tended to be developed segregated bases (e.g., sheltered facilities to supported employment). Employment integration is a worldwide issue, modified by approaches to multicultural groups (e.g. the growing Latino population in the US), the changing economy (e.g. from manufacturing to service), and increasing unemployment.

== Policies ==
Community integration has been most criticized for its inattention to gender, ethnic, cultural, racial, class, and economic factors ("double discrimination", pp. 60–61). At the university level multiculturalism, including disability, was proposed as the solution to these complex issues. Community integration, in practice, involves diverse approaches and models (age, team, agency, area, and gender integration or segregation) and has been integral to de-institutionalization and community development for over two decades. Community integration is a policy, concept, and practice to address systemic stigma and discrimination related to disability. It competes with other policy models (such as multiculturalism) and changes its practices over time.

=== Cross-disability ===
In the sub-field of brain injury, community integration included areas ranging from supported employment to daily living skills, family interventions (versus support) and memory training, school reintegration, and transition to post-secondary education. Community integration was being diversely defined by researchers, including those in fields such as brain injury, sensory impairments (e.g., hearing, visual), developmental, and physical disabilities. News and professional-journal articles will often read, "integration into the community" (from institutions and facilities), integrated care (health services integration), or "community reintegration" (after hospital care) worldwide.

In the field of mental health Paul Carling promoted community integration in the 1980s and 1990s in opposition to the predominant medical model, while psychiatric rehabilitation is also linked to the medical, often allied health, professions. Carling's approach to community integration in mental health was congruent with intellectual disabilities, particularly in areas of community living (e.g., supportive living in intellectual disabilities, supported housing in mental health, and housing and support). In 2008, Disability and Society, a popular disability policy journal discussed community reintegration for people with psychiatric disabilities and their relationship to centres for independent living.

Comprehensive medical systems were proposed to support the family in community integration, including new roles for specialized personnel from neuropsychologists to physiatrists. In the field of traumatic brain injury, community integration was framed by both the social and medical models of disability to transition people from hospitals and rehabilitation centres. Today, the Brain Injury Association of America recommends addressing the educational needs of children with traumatic brain injuries and the health care required.

=== US federal initiative ===
In 1985, the US government-funded a national community-integration project identifying best community practices for people with the "most severe disabilities". Technical assistance was funded through the Rehabilitation Research and Training Center on Community Integration (of the National Institute on Disability Rehabilitation Research and Training Center, US Department of Education) to all states. The Rehabilitation Research and Training Center on Community Integration (Syracuse University, headed by Steve Taylor) also subcontracted with the University of Illinois (David Braddock) and the University of Minnesota Institute on Community Integration (K. Charlie Lakin). The federal departments subsequently offered contracts to evaluate the status of these new community services in the US and others.

The principles of community integration through the national flagship centres (the Rehabilitation Research and Training Centre on Family and Community Living, facilitated by Lakin and J.A. Racino of Syracuse University) were:

- All people with disabilities will be able to live successfully in (and as part of) natural communities that provide them with the support they need.
- All people with disabilities will be recognized for the positive contributions they make to their families and communities.
- All people with disabilities will benefit from enduring relationships with other people (including family members and community members without disabilities).
- All people with disabilities (and their family members) will be entitled to participate in decisions affecting the nature and quality of services they receive.
- All people with disabilities will have access to services and supports that provide choice and support for full citizenship.
- Services and supports for people with disabilities will be individualized and responsive to cultural and ethnic differences, economic resources, and life circumstances.
- Public policy will provide the opportunity to enjoy productive, integrated lives.

The 1988 Leadership Institute on Community Integration, From Being in the Community to Being Part of the Community, led to the preparation of papers from workgroups representing the domains of community living, families, school, and employment. From this conference, four major themes in the field of community integration were noted:

- Major progress had been made.
- Direct attention towards achieving full integration and participation.
- A gap in best practices and the practices in most communities.
- Insufficient policy and economic support for community integration.

By the late 2000s, the Centers were renamed to Community Participation, one aspect of community integration, or Employment, or other priority areas, such as Health, with many of the above centres still federally funded through the NIDRR program (National Institute on Rehabilitation Research and Rehabilitation), US Department of Education and new academic centres at universities such as Temple University in Pennsylvania.

=== Principles and practices ===
Community integration means facilitating necessary personal assistance and support(s) for people with a disability to participate fully in their community, such as in recreation, employment, transportation, and education. For children with disabilities, community integration means providing support to their families. For adults, this can mean living in their own homes with the assistance of support services.

However, community support (e.g., consumer-directed services) as part of community-agency change and deinstitutionalization, self-determination, community participation, individual planning, social relationships and personal-assistance services became the leading direction in US community integration. Community integration has also been described as comparative to normalization, a widely known value-based system of human services (see, Wolfensberger, Nirje & Bank-Mikkelsen).

Community integration has been tied to quality assurance in the community and improved quality of life. It has involved evaluations and studies over at least two decades in areas ranging from service costs to personnel studies, service typologies, best practices and innovations, and community and integration studies. Internationally, quality of life has been explored in Finland, Australia, the US, Germany, Hungary, Denmark, and Canada.

== Global perspectives ==
Researchers in the US (Julie Ann Racino, Syracuse University) and Great Britain (David Towell, King's Fund College) collaborated on community integration, including a 1990 series of international seminars on community integration in the US held at the University of Manchester (Hester Adrian Research Center), Manchester Polytechnic and Manchester Health Authority, the King's Fund College (with Lyn Rucker), Campaign for the Mentally Handicapped (London), the University of Wales at Bangor (Center for Social Policy Research), and the University of Wales (Mental Handicap Research Unit). Internationally, research began on the "first integrated generation" in countries such as Sweden and integration were confirmed as a legal principle in the US.

Community services support, integration and inclusion are changing in countries such as Czechoslovakia (now the Czech Republic and Slovakia), Australia, New Zealand, Japan, Israel, Austria, Great Britain, Iceland, and Sweden. Since the 1990s the European Union has formed, populations in the Middle East have been emancipated, community self-advocacy has developed in South America and Africa and financial ownership of US debt has been undertaken (in part) by China. The United Nations offers guidance and leadership through its Convention on the Rights of Persons with Disabilities (particularly Article 19, which addresses independent living and community inclusion). A book based on these principles is "Public Administration and Disability: Community Services Administration in the US" (Racino, 2014) which links to the diverse nation-states and rationales for continuing educational, employment, and housing segregation Segregation in Northern Ireland.
