= Family support =

Support for relatives of disabled people

Family support is the support of families with a member with a disability, which may include a child, an adult, or a parent in the family. In the United States, family support includes neighbors, families, and friends; "paid services" through specialist agencies providing an array of services termed "family support services"; school or parent services for special needs such as respite care; specialized child care or peer companions; or cash subsidies, tax deductions or other financial subsidies. Family support has been extended to different population groups in the United States and worldwide. Family support services are a "community services and funding" stream in the United States, with variable "applications" based on disability groups, administrating agencies, and regulatory and legislative intent.

== History ==
Respite and family support services developed considerably in the late 1970s and early 1980s, particularly through the demands and initiatives of parents of children with disabilities. These initiatives occurred throughout the United States concurrent with the formation of activist parent groups in the 1970s, such as those in the state of New Hampshire. Foster care, which involved "substitute care" from birth families, preceded this organization of parents nationally, and together with group homes, was considered the primary form of community residential services in the US. By the 1990s, family support had become an established service reported regularly in the field of intellectual and developmental disabilities, and part of the state and local service systems in the US. Family support services were considered one of the better ways of supporting families and their children, including "building on natural supports" and encouraging the integration of children in the community.

=== Family models and services ===
By the early 1980s, states such as New York had established family support programs and agencies, New York State Office of Mental Retardation and Developmental Disabilities, and "model programs" were identified nationally which served children and their families in the community (e.g., MacComb-Oakland, Michigan, Dane, LaCrosse, and Columbia counties, Wisconsin). New models of family support services were initiated, including professional models which involved both traditional respites for the families (i.e., temporary relief from the stress of caring for children with "special needs") and individual recreation opportunities in generic agencies/sites for the son or daughter (versus traditional in-home babysitting child care). Professional parents sought to have respite places available in group homes (e.g., a friend of the home), to develop small group respite settings, to hold parent-to-parent support groups and meetings, to establish councils, and to have cash subsidies to meet the extra expenses of raising a "disabled child" (e.g., Exceptional Family Resources, Syracuse, New York, 1985). By 1983, the State of New York had funded three major demonstration grants, and then Governor Mario Cuomo and his wife Matilda held the first Family Support Conference in Albany, New York. By 1988, New York State reported $16,536,000 in discrete family support initiatives which did not include new agency family/cash subsidy demonstrations funded later in 1989–1990 in the state or agency cash subsidies included as part of family support demonstration programs (e.g., recreation/respite in generic agencies). In the public policy arena, respite was often explored in the context of child care for children with disabilities and additional expenses of raising a child with a disability as especially critical in low income-families.

=== Promotion on behalf of families ===
In 1985, Syracuse University's Center on Human Policy was awarded a three-year Community Integration Project from the National Institute on Disability Research and Rehabilitation to work with states and communities in the United States. The project, based on a national search conducted by the Wisconsin Developmental Disabilities Council, identified state cash subsidy programs in 21 states. The project, together with a new national Center on Community Integration, prepared information on family support for distribution, including a news bulletin on family support based on the project's research studies, an article on the case for family support for families, bibliographic references, innovative agencies and organizations, and an introduction to family support issues, such as family-centered supports, individualized and flexible supports, empowering families, use of natural, community supports, and permanency planning.

== Family counseling ==
Family counseling is a billable service which is separate from family support offered directly in the home and in community places, which could include private practice psychologists. Julie Ann Racino notes that university models of family support are high on a service called behavioral which is also prevalent in rehabilitation counseling, special education (e.g., time out boxes recently sued in schools), and with the growing mental health, substance abuse, and alcohol specific programs in the US. An update post the period of Governor Mario and Matilda Cuomo in New York is included in a new chapter from 2014 on Public Administration and Disability (Racino, 2014). Syracuse University held and cosponsored statewide conferences throughout the US, which included family support services as a basic part of community services development.

=== The purpose of family counseling ===
Family counseling and therapy are services intended to strengthen family relationships by, for example, improving participants' communication and facilitating discussions about sources of tension in the family. Family counseling and therapy address topics such as parents' difficulties connecting with a child, new adjustments to the family, and divorce. Other examples include coping with a family member who is suffering from mental health issues or addiction, and the emotions that come with such changes.

Family support services are dedicated to community outreach, identifying and addressing the needs of vulnerable populations, including children in foster care, struggling families, and individuals facing mental health challenges. These programs raise awareness, provide essential services, and foster strong support networks that empower and uplift the communities they serve.

=== What happens during a session ===
For the first session, there is the consultation, in which the therapist, psychologist, or clinical social worker, will ask about why you are seeking help, get to know you, what you want out of these sessions, and let you ask any question they might have for them. For other sessions though, you will have discussions, develop skills and abilities to problem solve, and express feelings and thoughts in a productive manner. You will explore ways in which your family works, rules, and behaviors, that will help combat conflict. You will also strengthen one another, build trust, and confide in one another.

=== What to expect ===
When doing these family sessions, you need to make sure the appropriate people are in attendance, those that are directly involved in the issue that you are going to this counseling for. Family helps with coping strategies and working through problems and issues that occur during your life, which counseling can help enhance. Sessions can be a bit time-consuming, 50 min to an hour, and the number of sessions may vary, depending on your issue, and how well the sessions go, so no two family sessions will be the same amount of time, activities, and conversations. The sessions are oftentimes short-term, you would not be in therapy for long periods of time. The amount of time that will be dedicated to these family therapy sessions is decided by the psychologist, clinical social worker, or therapist that is working with you. It does not immediately fix your issues, but when you stick with it, there has been a lot of positive feedback which has helped in learning great skills, and problem-solving.

== Basis in theories ==
Family support is based in part on theories related to families, particularly family systems theory, ecological and support theories, community support theories, life-span and life course theories, family psycho-social theories, family empowerment theory, the work-home resources model, and positivistic theories, such as the sociology of acceptance. In relation to services, basic policy concepts have included family-centeredness, capacity-based services, empowerment and participatory decision-making, and individualized (and appropriate) services, among others. Between the 1970s and 1990s, family support was developed in the context of community integration, building on the quarter-century work on the physical and social integration of families and their children. It differs from other models of family support developed in the context of employment programs, housing programs, nutrition, transportation, health care, or city emergency programs. These included: the Family Support Services of West Hawaii (including community and economic development activities), Family Support Services|Family Support Services of Amarillo (including employee assistance and family therapy), Family Support Services of Southeastern Pennsylvania (e.g., child welfare and early intervention), City of Chicago Family and Support Services (e.g., domestic violence, senior services). (brief web review, 2011).

== Growth in the US ==
By the 1990s, family support had gained great popularity in the field of intellectual disabilities, especially since 80-90% of children with disabilities continue to live with their families even today. Yet, the Human Services Research Institute determined that only 1.5% of the state budget for developmental disabilities services was used to support these families as of 1990. By 2006, family support spending was reported to be $2,305,149,428 in the US, yet, in FY 2006, it remained at only 5% of total intellectual and developmental disabilities spending of $43.84 billion. In the US, the costs of "family care" for intellectual and developmental disabilities have been studied, including direct financial costs met by families, indirect and opportunity costs, and indirect psychological costs.

In related fields, though, family support is still often considered to be "unpaid", "voluntary support" by family members, family-to-family training programs, and self-help groups, often near forms of family interventions by professionals (e.g., behavioral training, clinical assessments, vocational training, family therapy, clinical community re-entry) in traumatic brain injury. and in adult mental health. In children's mental health, family support and advocacy organizations are viewed to be increasing at the systems and policy levels, with the late 1980s formation of the Federation of Families for Children's Mental Health and the reformation of the National Alliance on Mental Illness, a strong parent organization from the late 1970s. Family support services today are viewed as important for families with individuals with diverse disabilities (e.g., motor-neuron disease, AIDS, epilepsy cerebral palsy, autism)with a greater emphasis on choice in support services (e.g., counseling, training and information, respite).

=== As a parent-professional field ===
As family support would be considered a parent-professional field, the research studies documented diverse disabilities (e.g., epilepsy, sickle cell anemia, hearing/visual impairment, spina bifida, cancer, learning disability), household incomes, level of assistance by daily living activities, behavioral and medical needs, insurance coverage, daily routines, the impact of disability on the household, services for specialized needs, and so forth. The field then was challenged in the 1990s to broaden approaches to families, including gendered caring, inner-city population groups, rural areas of the country, a "whatever it takes approach", and over-professionalized approaches to people's homes. This was followed by a national research study on these organizations supporting families in the community and those supporting adults with disabilities to live in their own homes., two major national and international comprehensive reform efforts in community living. Baltimore, MD: Paul H. Brookes. In addition, governmental policy today appears to continue to encourage adults with disabilities to live at home with parents or caregivers (2011); thus, family support funds are usually designated for families with children and adults living at home, including in families with aging parents. However, family supports are also integral to adoptive and foster families and may take the form of in-home aides or home assistance, provision of equipment, respite and home adaptations, and shared care options between birth and foster parents/families.

=== As a caregiving model ===
In line with the parent-professional partnerships of the 1980s and 1990s, the Oregon Research Institute published a book on Support for caregiving families. The book included the progressive professional stances on family stress and support,(For critique, see Racino & Heumann.) Value-based services based on the Center on Human Policy's statement in support for children and their families (1987), the role of parents in quality services, coping skills (often addressed by behavioral or skills training), human development and informal support, and family life cycles, including infants and early intervention, school-aged children (school programs), transition to adulthood (and supported employment), and eco-behavioral/clinical treatment of families (stronger in fields such as mental health), among others. Family support and aging, a major concern in the 2000s due to the aging population in the US, was also the focus of service reform in the 1990s. For example, 700,000 people with developmental disabilities live with one or more parents over the age of 65.

=== As a model of community services ===
As deinstitutionalization policies in the US moved toward the development of community services, community parents also became more interested in "out-of-home placements" (e.g., small group homes) of their children (e.g., children moving from the parental home and beginning adult lives). This approach is valued internationally as one way for adults to attain adult status, especially in Western countries. In states like New York and Connecticut, this resulted in tension between "institutional" and "community parents" vying for limited public funds, and between providers of services for funding (e.g., state institutions and private, non-profit community sectors). However, as states began to close institutions, funding was often available primarily to relocate those individuals living in institutional care or those at risk of institutionalization (e.g., home and community-based Medicaid waiver, HCBS). For example, "15 states financed 90% or more of their family support services with Medicaid HCBS; 11 states financed their family support activities through state funding. Since family support was recommended for children, options such as foster care (new models for adults and children)often included family support services, families on waiting lists were offered family support services, and a broader range of types of services was developed in different states (e.g., Wisconsin's menu of services).

== New and traditional population groups ==
In the 2000s, "new population groups" in family support, as part of family support theories in the US and worldwide, included:

- Multicultural and transnational families,
- Families which include a member who is gay, lesbian, transsexual, or bisexual
- Youth with disabilities,
- The aging population in the US,
- Youth in mental health,
- Families with a member with a brain injury, and
- Parents with intellectual and other disabilities, among others.

=== Adolescent mothers and single parent families ===
Traditional groups known to be at risk of adolescent mothers were sometimes involved in social support and adolescent theories, as part of adolescent pregnancies and mothering research. At-risk families with intellectual disabilities also may be single mothers and early recommendations were for additional support options such as boarding nearby to family, modifying apartment programs to allow children, and increasing family support services in private homes. Critical are personal and family values, empowerment of families and home visitors, parent-child activities, and cluster groups (e.g., neighborhood improvement, natural childbirth groups, toddler playgroups, team group support), among others (e.g., Cochran, et al., 1984).

=== Multicultural and transnational families ===
In addition, the needs of multicultural families, based on changing US demographics, also resulted in greater attention to the major minority groups, including African Americans, Asian Americans, native Indian Americans, and Hispanic/Latino Americans. Original approaches involved services to Native Americans on reservations (often poverty) or as "assimilation into white society" in contrast to approaches involving housing integration of "diverse populations" (e.g., Asian Americans) in mixed-income housing in small cities. Today (2012), the American Indians, for example, own and operate casino gambling in the US and obtain funds for their own social services. In addition, new transnational families, who may be separated from their families by international migration, form part of the new face of families in the US as does the gay, lesbian, bisexual, and transgender activist populations.

=== Youth with disabilities ===
Youth with disabilities became an emerging "age group" in the late 1980s and 1990s as family approaches (often parent-based) competed with approaches based more on the desires of youth with disabilities. For example, personal assistance approaches based on diverse lifestyles and hiring of aides by service users became a popular way of thinking about services. In addition, major federal initiatives in transition planning in the US resulted in a variety of approaches to moving from child-centered to adult services, based in part, upon theories of adolescent development. Today, self-advocacy has grown worldwide and youth, in particular, have sought their own voices and futures.

=== Aging population ===
The changing demographics of aging in the US have been well documented in diverse fields with its public-facing the need to revamp the nation's Social Security system. The latter can no longer, as developed in the Depression Era, financially support the growing aging population which outstrips the younger generation paying into the system. For example, "between 2010 and 2030, the number of people aged 65 and older is projected to increase by 76%, while the number of workers supporting the system is projected to increase by 8%". The elder population also is living longer, expected to have a marked increase in the people living over the age of 80, involving an increase in "disabilities" such as dementia (e.g., Public Broadcasting, 2011), affecting social security disability benefits, and also the discovery of older adults with lifelong disabilities in "community-dwelling" two-generation families.

=== Youth, children and adults in mental health ===
Instead of family support in the field of mental health, parent organizations have formed state and national chapters independent of their children (e.g., National Alliance for the Mentally Ill). In addition, community agencies often have developed parent education programs (which remains government-funded program in the US), and family therapists and counselors (often in private practice) tend to work with the whole family. Personal assistance and independent living approaches tend to begin with the desires and wishes of the youth or adult, and less often, the children; these approaches in mental health remain relatively uncommon though psychosocial approaches have some similarities. While housing and support and employment support have been transferred across fields, greater reluctance exists in the field of mental health for "family support" (often starting with parental concerns) who often bill the parents as secondary service recipients.

In psychiatric rehabilitation, "families are a major resource impacting rehabilitation outcome" (families as allies) with 50-60% returning home from hospitals in the US (Anthony, et al., 2002, p. 185). Extended families are viewed as critical worldwide, and many approaches are categorized as "family management" (e.g., information, treatments, family management), family interventions, or "psychoeducational" (Ibid, 2002). However, leading national research centers in the US examined state service systems and recommended prevention and family support for children in mental health and their families. Such "ecologically-grounded models" which are expected to improve or "mediate child and parent outcomes" have often been the first targeted in difficult economic times; the "full-fledged family support movement" of community-based agencies was reported in 1992 as "struggling to operationalize a new set of services and a new way of doing business with families".

=== Parents with intellectual disabilities ===
By the 2000s, internationally, the support of parents who themselves have intellectual disabilities moved to new prominence with extensive, multi-decade research after initial programs and studies in the US as early as the late 1980s and 1990s. In addition, traditional parent training programs moved to community building and parents/mothers with physical disabilities also prominently advocated for better lifestyles for themselves and their children, included as part of a new US National Resource Center for Parents with Disabilities. (April 1998). Through the Looking Glass administered the 5-year center on behalf of the "8 million American families in which one or both parents has a disability."

=== Families with a member with a brain injury ===
In 2015, partially as a result of the Iraq and Afghanistan wars, veterans are returning home with head and brain injuries and then returning from hospital and rehabilitation to spouses and family. Common may be a referral to a support group for the spouse or caregiver who may experience "caregiver stress" and "burden of care", the result of inadequate community services in homes and for families. In addition, brain or head injuries can be caused by vehicular accidents, sports injuries, falls or accidents, war and terrorism, and related medical conditions (e.g., brain tumor, stroke). Family support in these fields often refers to support groups or direct support from the family and neighbors to the individual with the brain injury or the rehabilitation or hospital program as the family support.

== US policy goals ==
In the National Goals and Research for People with Intellectual and Developmental Disabilities, support of families and family life across the lifespan was considered one of the major goals of the extensive work group of leaders in that field (e.g., Ann Turnbull, Rud Turnbull, John Agosta, Elizabeth Erwin, Glenn Fujuira, George Singer, and Leslie Sodak, among others). The overarching goal was: To support the caregiving efforts and enhance the quality of life of all families so that families will remain the core unit of American society. The five subgoals include:

- Goal A: To ensure family-professional partnerships in research, policy-making, and the planning and delivery of supports and services so that families control their own destinies with due regard to the autonomy of adult family members with disabilities to control their own lives.
- Goal B: To ensure that families fully participate in communities of their choice through comprehensive, inclusive, neighborhood-based, and culturally responsive supports, and services.
- Goal C: To ensure that services and supports for all families are available, accessible, appropriate, affordable and accountable.
- Goal D: To ensure that sufficient public and private funding will be available to implement these goals and that all families will participate in directing the use of public funds authorized and appropriated for their benefits.
- Goal E: To ensure that families and professionals have full access to state-of-the-art knowledge and best practices and that they will collaborate in using knowledge and practices. (p. 221).

Such efforts are critical as the US has often been criticized for having a lack of a coherent family policy for all its people (e.g., health care, housing, employment, leisure, community, and economic development).

== International ==
Family support is indeed an international initiative with 1994 the International Year of the Family as proclaimed by the United Nations. Helle Mittler, from Great Britain, reported on the TASK Force of the International League of Societies for Persons with Mental Handicaps which highlighted Face to Face in the United Kingdom, Young Muslim Women's Association Comprehensive Programme in Jordan, Service Brokerage in Canada, Swasahaya Sumachaya, Mysore, and Karnataka Parents' Association in India, Market Place Support Group in Côte d'Ivoire, Africa, Brothers and Sisters Groups in Nicaragua and India, Fathers' group in the United Kingdom, and Parents and Professionals Learning Together in Bangladesh and Pakistan.

In 2012, the international community is on individual and family life quality, family support is a long-term service and supports (LTSS) in the US in communities and a new chapter, "Family theories, family support and family studies" will be released in 2014.

== The Essential Role of Family in Mental Health Recovery ==
While family members offer a direct form of emotional, psychological, and practical support that stabilizes the lives of those affected by depression, anxiety, post-traumatic stress disorder, and other psychological disorders, it can be experience-changing. Involving families in the recovery process will:

Less isolated- The very sense of being surrounded by loving family and friends conveys a sense of security and belonging for those in need.

Encouraging treatment adherence- Other members of the family will remind, advise, and motivate those in need to make their therapy sessions or take medications.

Create a safe environment- Such supportive home environments are supposed to create low-stress environments in which individuals can learn to control their feelings.

Enhancing dialogue and understanding- Families that are qualified about mental health can offer valuable support, eliminating many cases of misunderstanding.
