= Canada–Hong Kong relations =

- Canada: Hong Kong

Canada and Hong Kong share a legal and political history as parts of the former British Empire, and Canada continues to maintain strong relations with Hong Kong as a special administrative region within China. The Canadian government strongly supports Hong Kong's autonomy under Chinese sovereignty in accordance with the "one country, two systems" principle as provided for in the Sino-British Joint Declaration and the Hong Kong Basic Law, which serves as Hong Kong's organic law.

Canadian policy toward Hong Kong is underpinned by its substantial commercial interests, the established Hong Kong diaspora in Canada, and the substantial Canadian expatriate community in the territory. An estimated 300,000 Canadian citizens reside in Hong Kong, making Hong Kong the second-largest Canadian community abroad after the United States. Canada and Hong Kong SAR both share the same "birthday," on 1 July, as Canada Day and Hong Kong SAR Establishment Day respectively.

== History ==
Both Hong Kong and Canada shared common history for being part of the British Empire. Interactions between Hong Kong and Canada increased with the start of Trans-Pacific services of Canadian Pacific Steamship Company (CPSC), a company of Canadian Pacific Railway in the late 19th century. From 1887 through 1941, three specially designed Empress ocean liners—the RMS Empress of China, the RMS Empress of India and the RMS Empress of Japan provided passengers and cargo services, in addition being contracted postal service provider between the British Isles and Hong Kong via Canada began in 1891. CPR initiated an ocean-going service between the port of Vancouver and Victoria, BC and Hong Kong, with calls at Japan and China, and later at Manila, Philippine Islands and Honolulu, Hawaii. This service provided a link for CPR's transcontinental railroad passenger and freight services. Passengers could travel from the British Isles to Eastern Canada, travel across Canada via railway to Vancouver, and onward to Asian destinations including Hong Kong. During 1887, temporary steamship service was initiated on a Vancouver-Yokohama-Hong Kong route. Low-cost labourers from southern China could travel from Hong Kong to Western Canada on the same route, eventually help building the Canadian Pacific Railway (between 1881 and 1885) and Yukon in the 1890s for potential gold prospects.

The first ever Canadian representative in Hong Kong was the Canadian Immigration office, which opened in 1923. Canadian first participated in a land battle during the Second World War, albeit a lost battle, was the Battle of Hong Kong. The same mission elevated to become Canadian Trade Commission from 1927 until the Handover of Hong Kong Sovereignty in July 1997, when it became the current mission of Canadian Consulate-General to Hong Kong & Macao.

In November 2020, Canada's consul general in Hong Kong and Macao said that the Canadian government had drafted plans to evacuate nearly 300,000 Canadians living in Hong Kong if the security situation deteriorated.

== Bilateral agreements ==
Articles 151, 153 and 155 of the Hong Kong Basic Law permit Hong Kong to conclude its own non-military bilateral agreements with foreign countries. The bilateral treaty on air services between Canada and Hong Kong predates the handover of Hong Kong and has remained in force since 1988. Since the transfer to Chinese sovereignty, the governments of Canada and Hong Kong entered in to several other bilateral agreements. A mutual legal assistance treaty was enacted in 2002. The Canada-Hong Kong Income Tax Agreement, a tax treaty, entered into force on October 29, 2013.

The Canada-Hong Kong Surrender of Fugitive Offenders Agreement, an extradition treaty enacted on June 13, 1997, between Canada and Hong Kong, was suspended by Government of Canada on July 3, 2020, in response to the promulgation of the Hong Kong national security law by the Chinese Central Government.

== Cultural ==
There are 500,000 people of Hong Kong descent in Canada, which encompasses around 216,000 people of Hong Kong born population now live in Canada, per 2006 Census in Canada. The Asia Pacific Foundation of Canada gave a conservative estimate of over 295,000 Canadians living in Hong Kong, as of 2011, while Hong Kong Census declared along with some, plays a dynamic role in building vibrant bilateral relations. Over 100,000 Canadian university alumni representing various active alumni associations in Hong Kong.

The Consulate General of Canada in Hong Kong and Macao in Central represents the Canadian federal government in Hong Kong as well as in the neighbouring SAR of Macau. Some Canadian provinces also operate their own trade offices or immigration offices in Hong Kong; these include Alberta, British Columbia and Quebec. In Canada, the Hong Kong SAR is represented through the Hong Kong Economic and Trade Office based in Toronto, Ontario.

There are an estimated 295,000 Canadians residing in Hong Kong, larger than the population of Regina or Saskatoon, or twice of that of the province of Prince Edward Island, of which 85% are Canadian-born (higher than Canada's 80.2%), and an estimated >500,000 Hong Kong Canadians residing in Canada. The Canadian Consulate General in the territory is among the largest foreign missions of Canada and larger than many Canadian embassies by number of staff and annual budget, and engages actively in the latest political development of the territory, including statements regarding suppression of human rights and press freedom, and open support in the form of posts and tweets towards the annual vigil to commemorate the June 4th Tian'anmen Massacre in 1989. Hong Kong Canadians have served as Governor-General, Lieutenant Governors, Senator, ministers and shadow ministers, members of provincial assemblies, university chancellor, and city councillors.

== Tourism ==
According to data from Tourism Industry Association of Canada, Canadian tourists in Hong Kong spent more than C$99 million in the year 2011. On the other way 46,680 Canadian tourists visited Hong Kong making Canada the eighth highest source of tourists.

Both Canada and Hong Kong have offered "Working Holiday Programs" since March 2010. The programme allows 200 young students to holiday in Hong Kong or Canada and to take temporary employment as needed to cover the expenses of their visit. The programme aims to increase travel by young people between Canada and Hong Kong and to strengthen the links between the two regions.

== See also ==
- Canada–China relations
- Canada–Taiwan relations
- Consulate General of Canada in Hong Kong and Macao
- Foreign relations of Canada
- Foreign relations of Hong Kong
