= Canada–Taiwan relations =

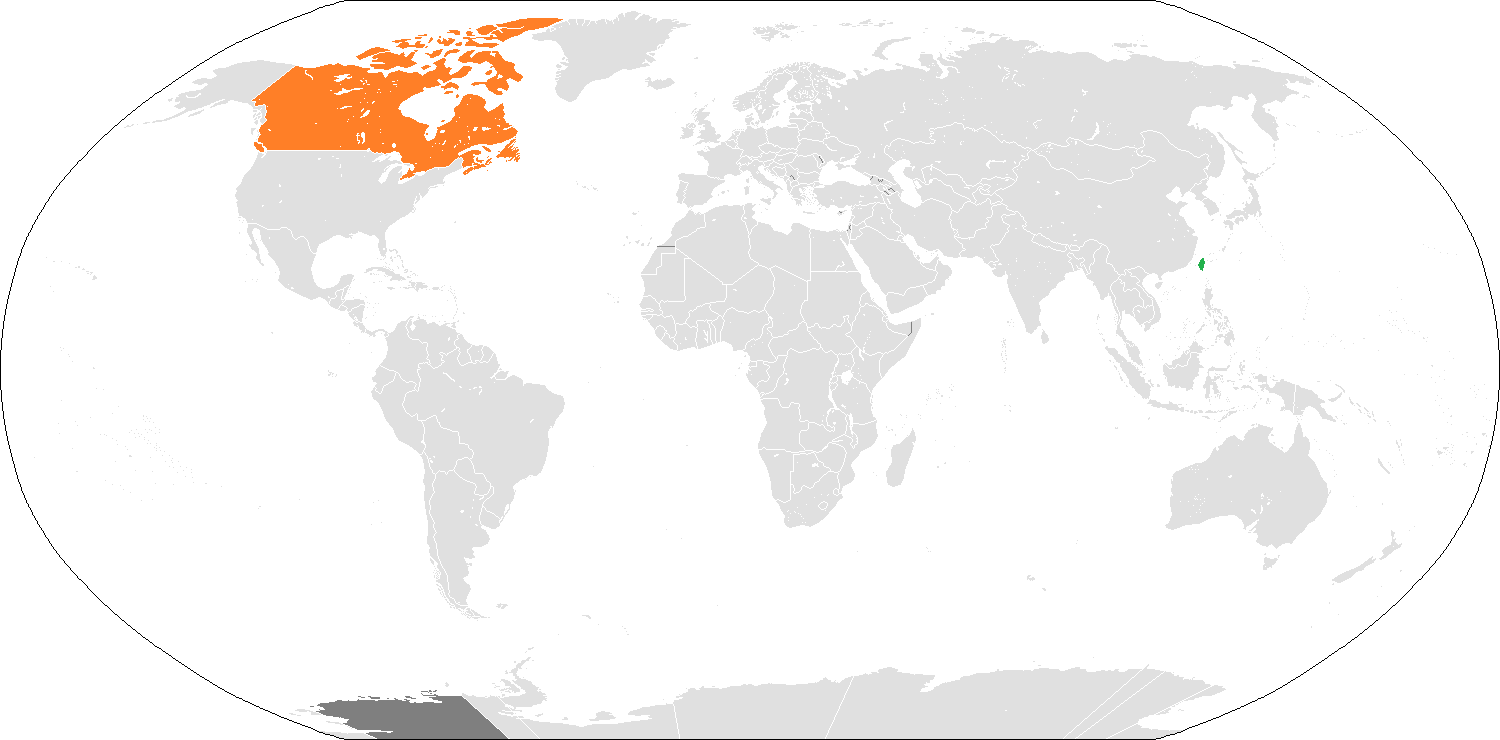

- Taiwan: Canada

Diplomatic mission
- Taipei Economic and Cultural Office in Canada: Canadian Trade Office in Taipei

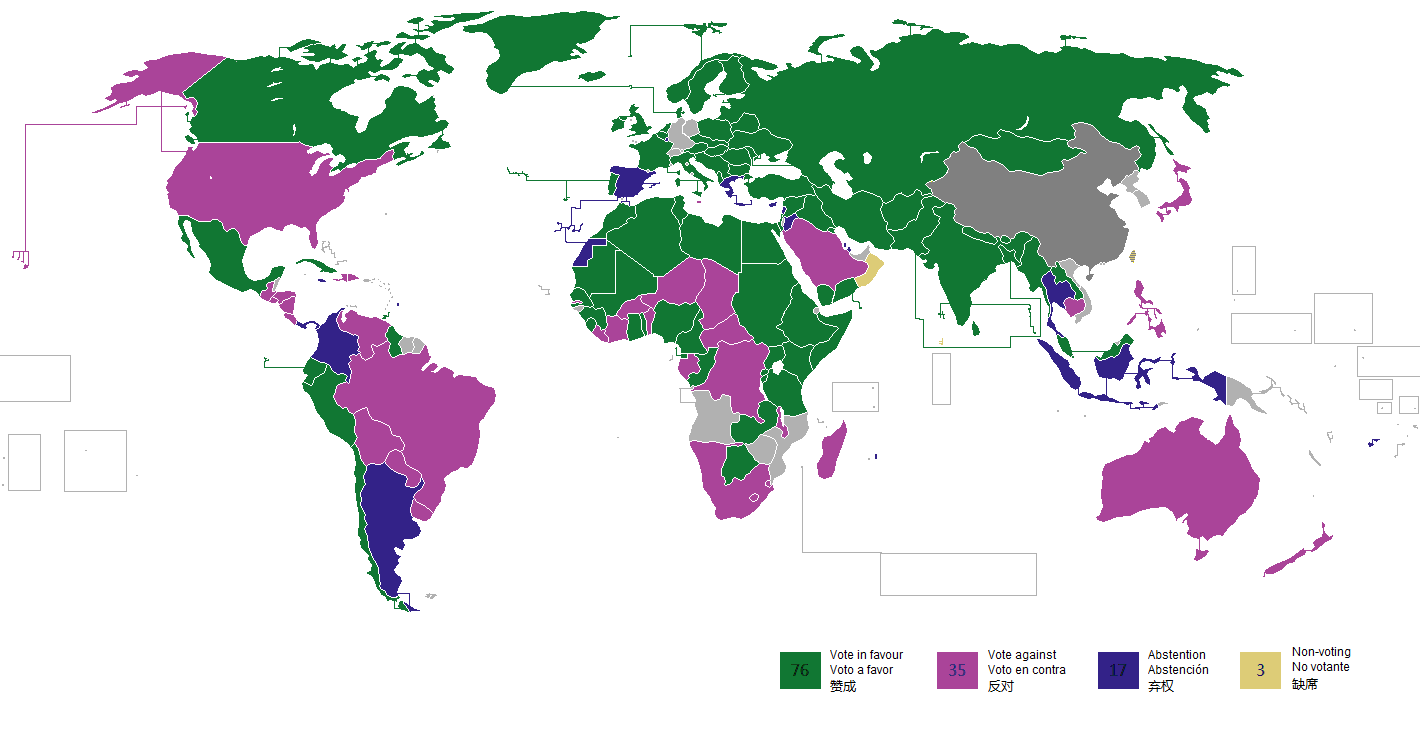
Canada agreed to the replacement in UN-2758

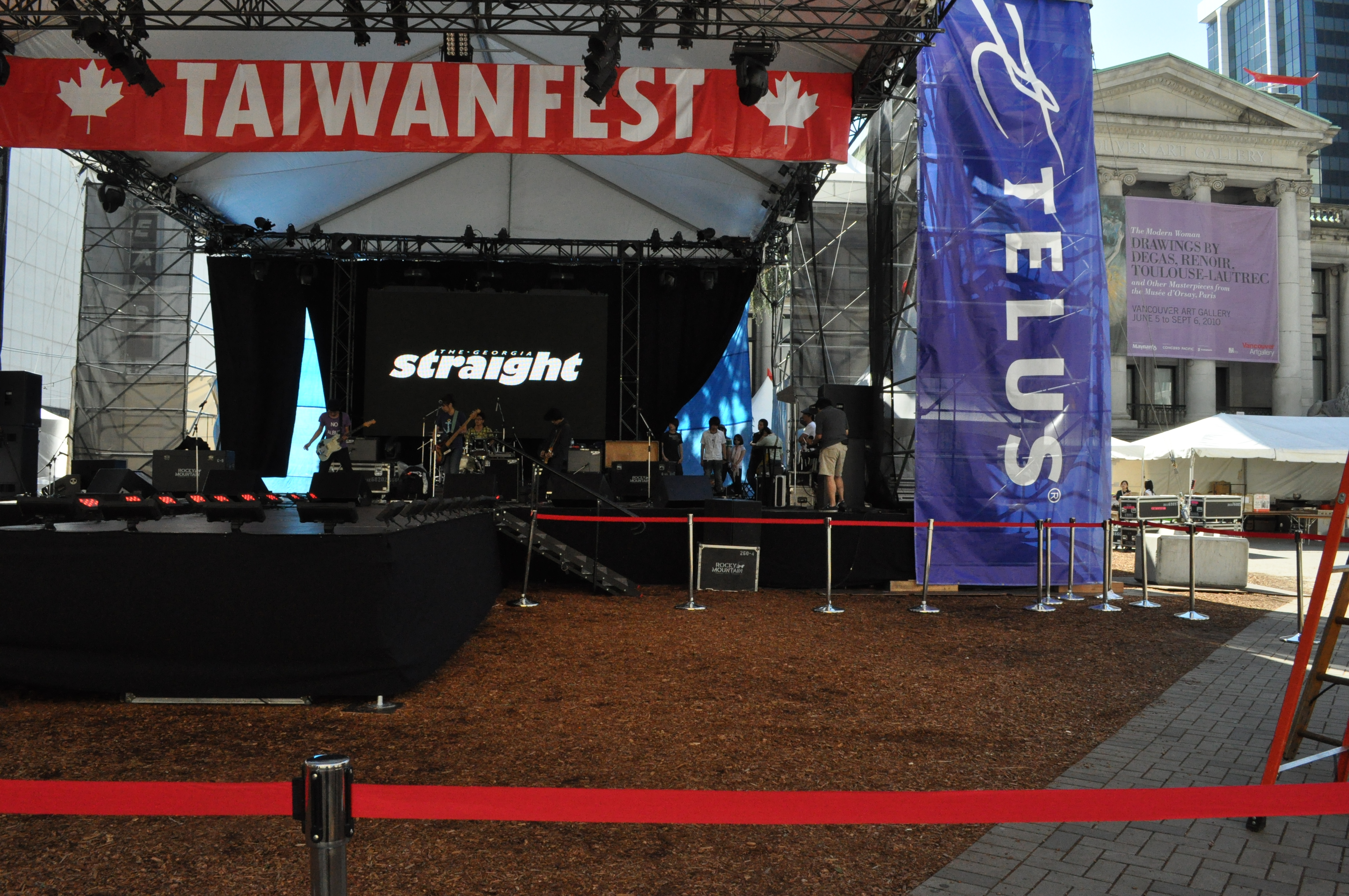
TaiwanFest in Vancouver

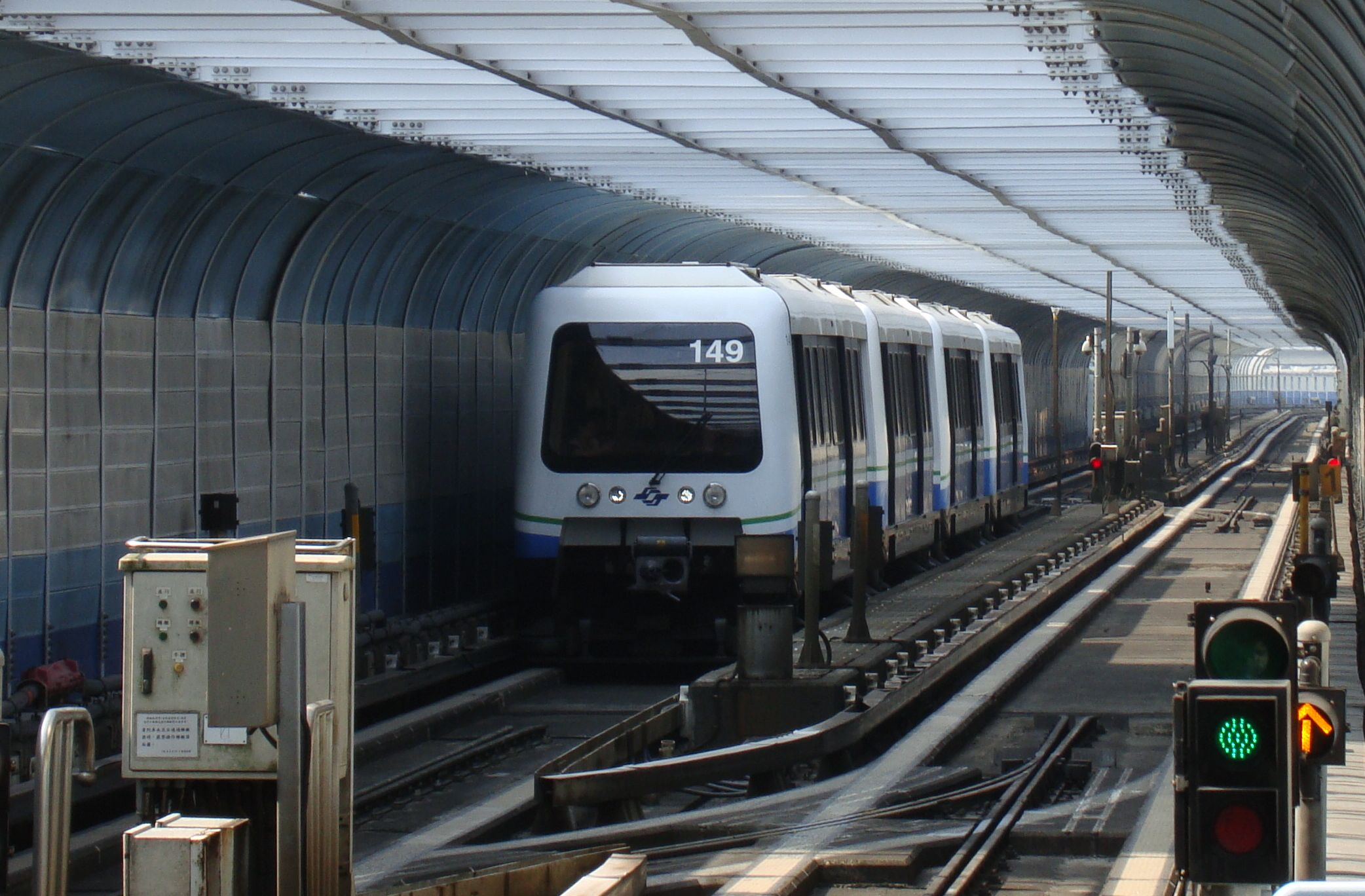
Train in Taipei Metro made by Bombardier Inc.

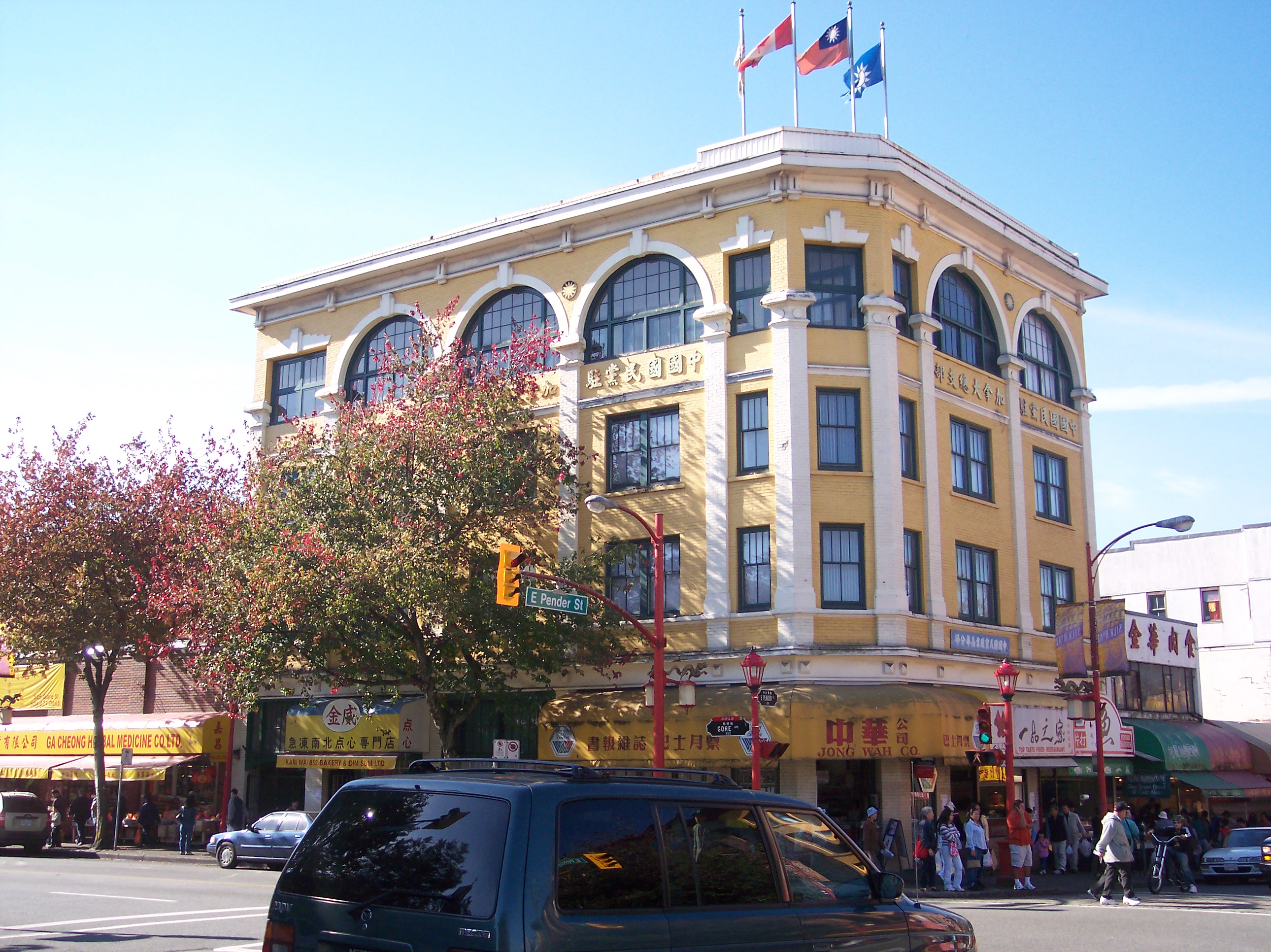
Kuomintang building in Vancouver

Canada and Taiwan (also known as Republic of China) have maintained unofficial bilateral relations since 1970. First contacts between Canada and Taiwan began in 1871 with the arrival of George Leslie Mackay.

Relations between Canada and the ROC were established in 1942. Since Canada's recognition of the People's Republic of China as the sole representative of "China" in 1970, there are no ambassadorial relations between Canada and Taiwan due to the Canadian government's One-China Policy, but there are strong ties of trade and culture between the two entities since at least 1986. Officially, Canada "takes note" of China's claim to Taiwan without endorsing or challenging this position.

== History ==
=== Early contacts ===
George Leslie Mackay moved to Taiwan in 1871 as the island's first Presbyterian missionary. He worked at the Canadian Mission's Tamsui outpost as a teacher and dentist.

Relations between Canada and Qing China were established on January 9, 1909. Canada posted its first ambassador for the Republic of China in 1942 located in the wartime capital of Chongqing. The embassy was then moved to the permanent capital of Nanjing in 1946. However, with the Communist victory over the Nationalists, which caused them to retreat to Taiwan, formerly a Qing prefecture that was under Japanese dominion for 50 years, while the Communists established the People's Republic of China, the Canadian embassy in Nanjing was kept open until February 26, 1951.

=== Modern history ===
Canada continued to recognize the ROC as the sole representative of China after the latter's retreat to Taiwan. However, Canada has neither reopened its embassy in Taipei nor appointed an ambassador there. In 1955, the Canadian government concluded that the status of Taiwan remained unresolved. The option of recognizing both the ROC and the People's Republic of China (PRC) was impossible as both authoritarian polities insisted on sole recognition.

On 13 October 1970, Canada recognized the PRC and suspended diplomatic relations with the ROC in Taiwan. In the United Nations General Assembly Resolution 2758 Canada supported the PRC as the representative of "China" to the United Nations. After diplomatic relations between Canada and the ROC were suspended, both diplomatic missions were replaced by representative offices.

Presently, the Government of the Republic of China maintains the Taipei Economic and Cultural Office in Canada in Ottawa, and three other offices in Vancouver, Toronto and Montreal. Taiwan External Trade Development Council also has offices in Toronto and Vancouver.

The Government of Canada established the Canadian Trade Office in Taipei in 1986 during the days of Brian Mulroney. During the mandate of Stephen Harper the Canadian Office expanded and moved to the Xinyi District of Taipei.

In October 2019, Stephen Harper visited Taipei as a private citizen to attend the Yushan Forum, promote his book, Right Here, Right Now, and give a speech that was described as a "thinly-veiled criticism of China's economic model" by the Globe and Mail.

In 2024 British Columbia opened a trade office in Taiwan. Called the British Columbia Trade and Investment Representative Office it is located in Taipei.

== Economic ==
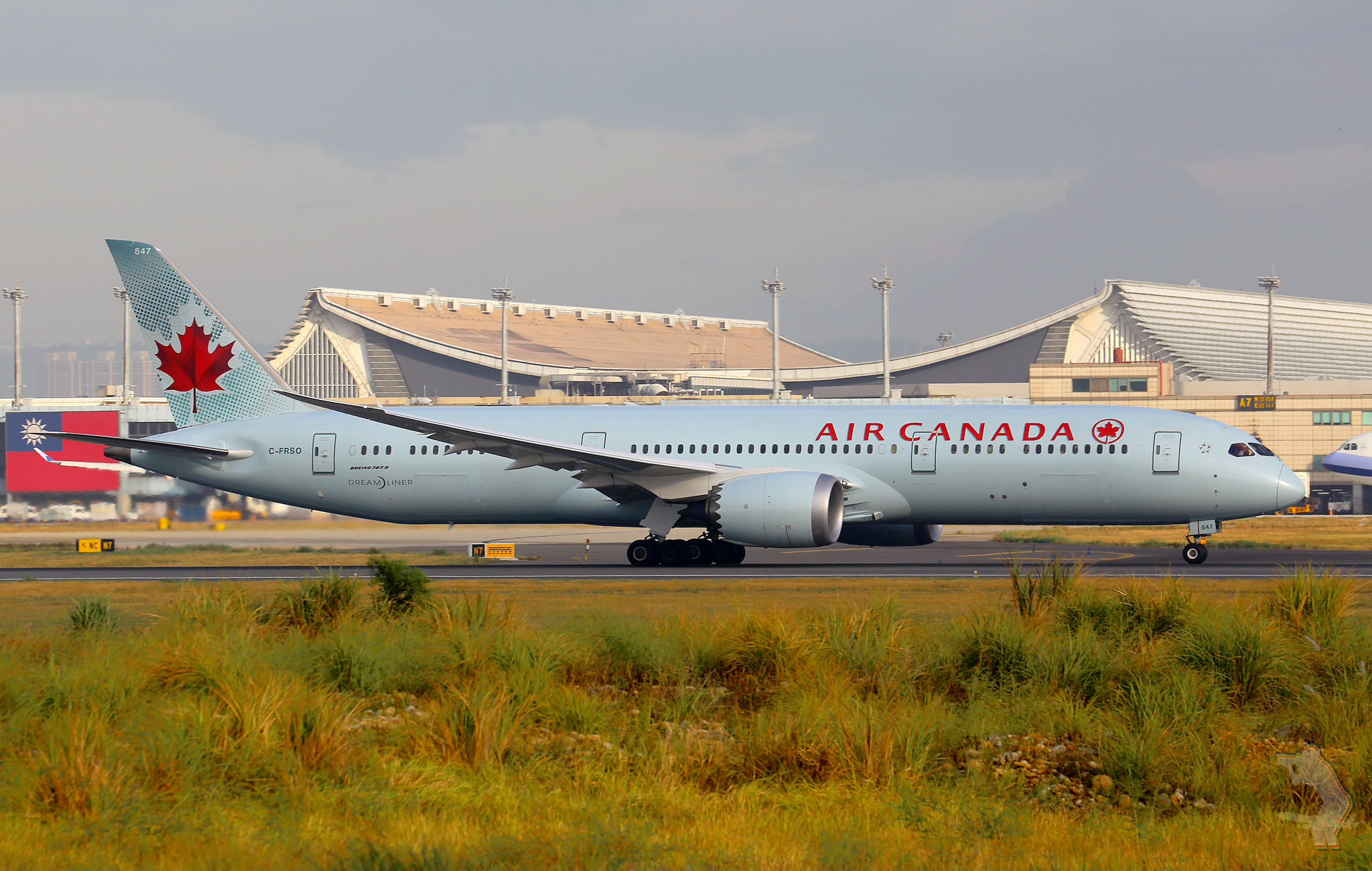
Air Canada aircraft in Taiwan

In 2019, Taiwan was reportedly the fifth-largest trading partner in Asia of Canada.

Canada became the 24th largest trade partner of Taiwan, which exported to Canada over $1.5bn worth of goods and services in 2017–18, ranking it 19th on the Canadian list. The main exports from Taiwan to Canada were mobile devices, recording equipment, boilers, steel products, and plastic products.

In 2018, the balance of trade between Taiwan and Canada in 2018 was 47.9 billion Canadian dollars in favour of the Taiwanese.

As the Canadian difficulties with China mounted in 2019, academics like Hugh Stephens suggested that the Taiwanese relationship be fostered and promoted, which he saw as being consistent with Canada's democratic values. He would encourage the accession of Taiwan to the CPTPP, and noted that Taiwanese membership with the WTO allowed New Zealand to sign an FTA with Taiwan in 2013.

In October 2023, it was announced that Canada and Taiwan has completed negotiations on a foreign investment promotion and protection arrangement.

In 2023, Taiwan became Canada's 15th largest trading partner. Top Canadian exports to Taiwan included financial services, intellectual property, research and development, travel and transport.

In April 2024, Canada and Taiwan's representative offices signed a science and research arrangement to enable opportunities for commercial partnerships in high tech sectors.

== Transportation ==
There are direct flights between both nations with China Airlines and EVA Air.

== Taiwanfest ==
Taiwanfest began in 1990 in Vancouver by musical/cultural magnate Cecilia Chueh as a music festival but expanded to include various cultural events. From 2006 onwards, it is also expanded and celebrated in Toronto.

== Resident diplomatic missions ==
of Canada in Taiwan

- Taipei (Trade Office)

of Taiwan in Canada

- Ottawa (Economic and Cultural Office)
- Montreal (Economic and Cultural Office)
- Toronto (Economic and Cultural Office)
- Vancouver (Economic and Cultural Office)

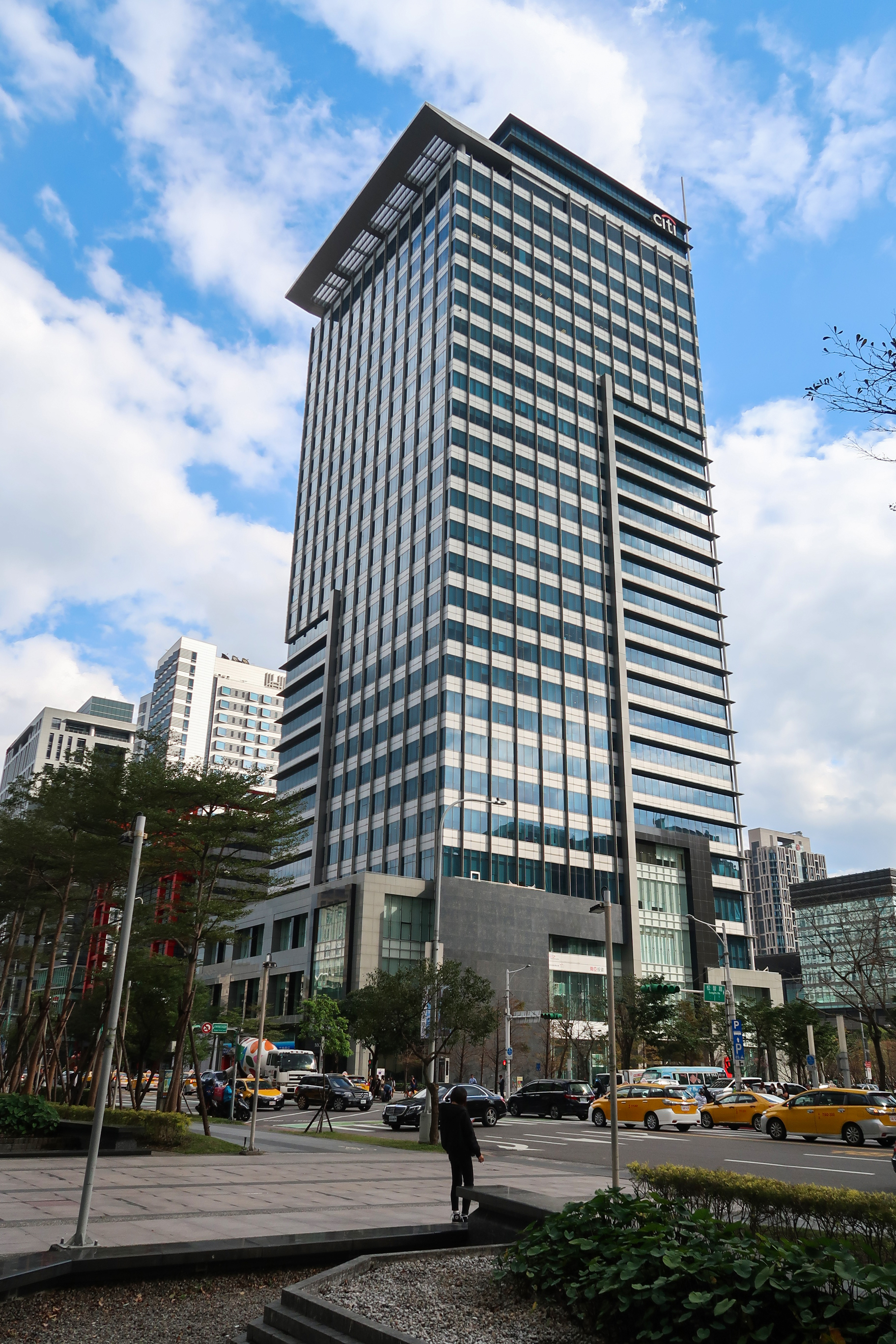
Building hosting the Canadian Trade Office in Taipei

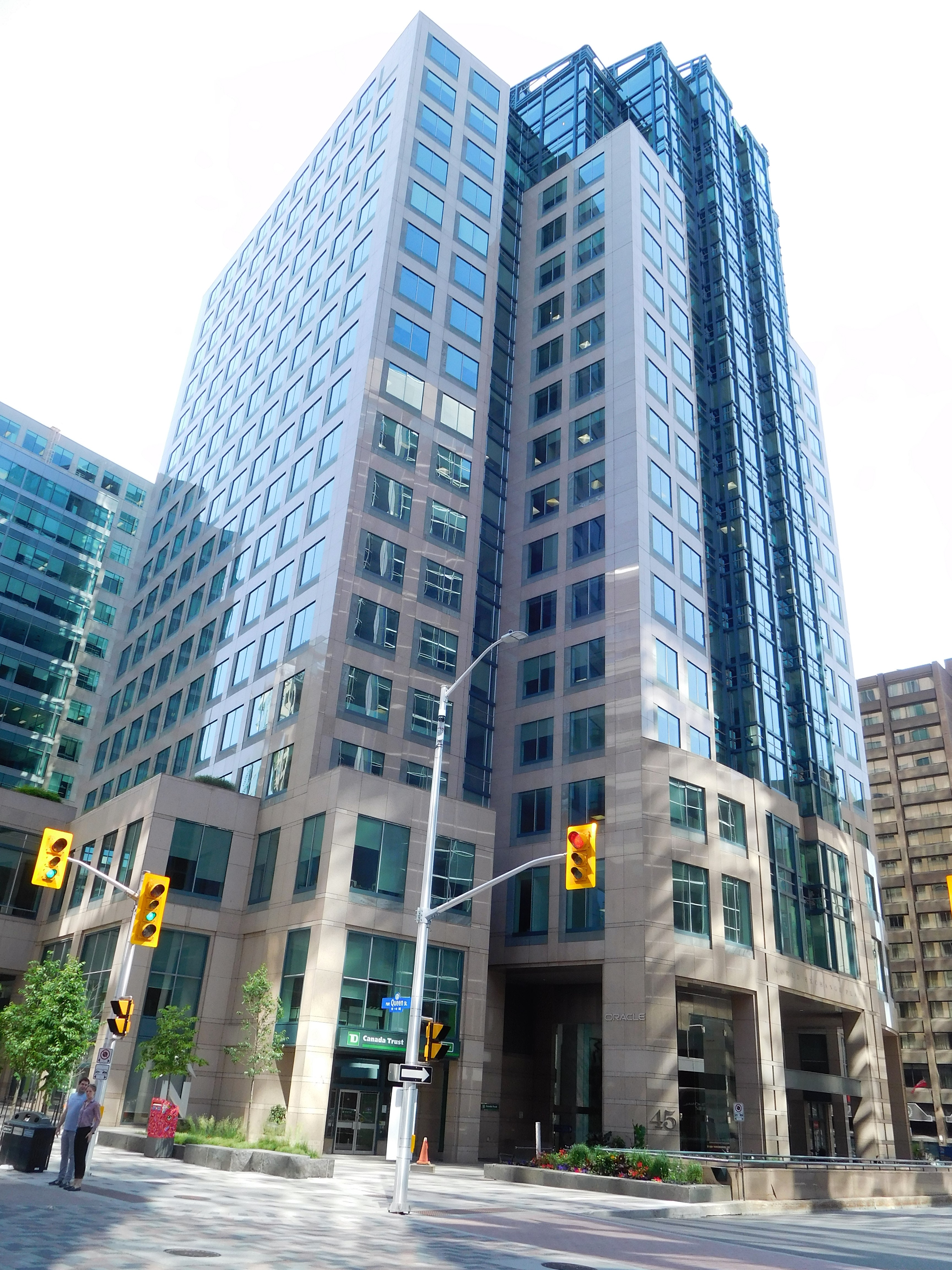
Building hosting the Taipei Economic and Cultural Office in Ottawa

== See also ==
- Canada–China relations
- Canada–Hong Kong relations
- Foreign relations of Canada
- Foreign relations of Taiwan
- Taiwanese Canadians
