= Canadians in Hong Kong =

Total population
- 16,000 (2014, Government of Hong Kong); 300,000 (2014, Consulate-General of Canada)

Languages
- English, Chinese

Like their American counterparts, a significant number of Canadians live and work in Hong Kong. In February 2011 research from the Asia Pacific Foundation, conducted with Hong Kong Baptist University, suggests there are at least 295,000 Canadians in Hong Kong, which is more than the population of places like Regina or Saskatoon. Nearly 85% of Canadians in Hong Kong were born in Canada, a figure higher than in Canada itself (80.2%). This represents the third largest community of Canadians, after Canada itself and the United States. The overwhelming majority of these are ethnic Chinese.

The government of Hong Kong does not recognise dual nationals originally from Hong Kong as Canadian citizens, so that government circa 2014 counted about 16,000 Canadians in Hong Kong, while the Consulate-General of Canada in Hong Kong counted 300,000 Canadians.

== Diplomatic missions ==
The Consulate General of Canada in Hong Kong and Macao serves Canadians in Hong Kong.

== Education ==
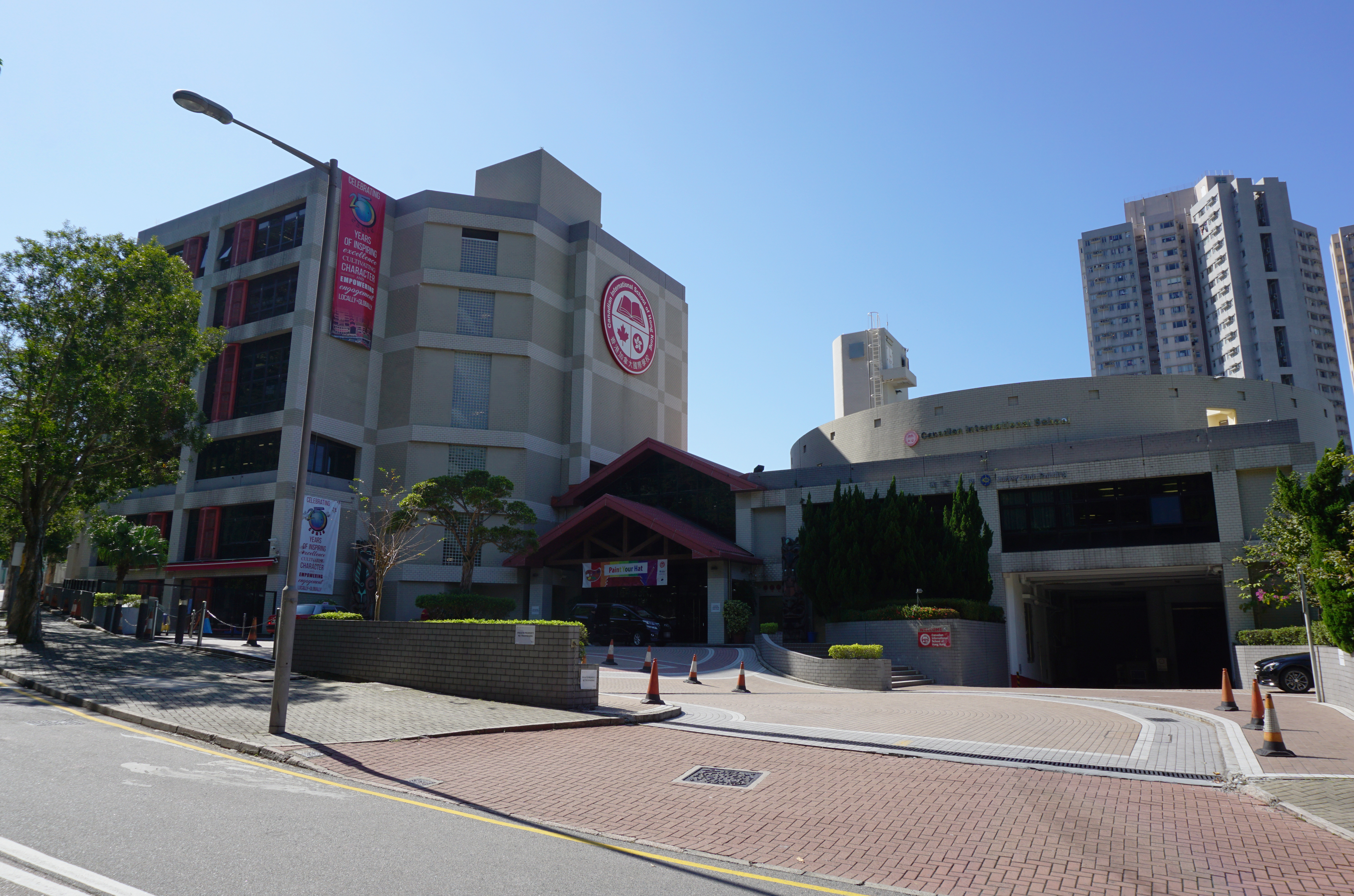
Canadian International School of Hong Kong

The Canadian International School of Hong Kong serves Canadians in Hong Kong.

== People ==
- Adderly Fong, race car driver
- Aimee Chan, actress
- Bernice Liu, actress
- Charlene Choi, singer in the singing duo Twins
- Cordia Tsoi, Olympian
- Doreen Steidle
- Cissy Wang, fashion model
- Edison Chen, singer and actor
- Eliza Sam, actress and model
- Fred Cheng, singer and actor
- Grace Chan, actress
- Jade Kwan, singer; her parents live in Vancouver.
- Jay Fung, singer, songwriter
- Jeanie Chan, actress and model
- Joyce Cheng, actress; daughter of Lydia Shum
- Karena Lam, actress
- Kelvin Kwan, singer
- Lap-Chee Tsui, former chancellor of the University of Hong Kong
- Lawrence Chou, singer
- Linda Chung, actress
- Lydia Shum, actress
- MC Cheung, singer
- Otto Poon Lok-to, Husband of Teresa Cheng, the Secretary for Justice of Hong Kong
- Patrick Tse Yin, actor
- Phil Lam, singer, songwriter
- Sally Yeh, singer
- Samantha Lam, Olympian
- Sammy Sum, singer and actor
- Sonija Kwok, actress
- Susanna Kwan, actress and singer

== Canadian legacy in Hong Kong ==
A few of places in Hong Kong are or were named for Canadians who have lived or served in various capacities in Hong Kong.

- Osborn Barracks - now PLA East Kowloon Barracks and named for Sgt Maj. John Robert Osborn, a Canadian Army personnel who died in the defence of Hong Kong in 1941. A statue of Osborn now resides in Hong Kong Park.
- Tiu Keng Leng - once called Rennie's Mill, named for Canadian businessman and founder of Hong Kong Milling Company Alfred Herbert Rennie.
- Macpherson Stadium, Hong Kong (as well as McPherson Playground, MacPherson Place) - named for Canadian missionary John Livingstone McPherson who worked for the YMCA in Hong Kong from 1905 to 1935.

== See also ==
- Hong Kong Canadian
