= Supported living =

Living arrangements for disabled people

Supported living or supportive living refers to a range of services and community living arrangements (CLAs) designed with individuals with disabilities and their families to support citizens with disabilities to attain or retain their independence (see independent living) or interdependence in their local communities. Supported living is recorded in the history of the NASDDDS (National Association of State Directors of Developmental Disabilities Services), celebrating its 50th anniversary. Community Supported Living Arrangements (CSLA) was a landmark federal multi-state demonstration to illustrate the federal role in community living in the US. Supported living is considered a core service or program of community living programs funded through federal-state-local partnerships.

== In the United States ==
Supported living has been defined in diverse ways in the US, including early conceptualization in New York as integrated apartment living, and one early definition by the state of Oregon:

"Supported living is defined as persons with disabilities living where and with whom they want, for as long as they want, with the ongoing support needed to sustain that choice."

"Supported living...its simplicity is elegant. A person with a disability who requires long-term publicly funded, organized assistance, allies with an agency whose role is to arrange or provide whatever assistance is necessary for the person to live in a decent and secure home of the person's own."

As a form of community living development, supported living became identified with certain approaches to services and community, including the own home initiatives. These services involved an understanding of "formal" and "informal support" (and their relationship), and changes from "group thinking" approaches (e.g., ten intermediate care facilities for 15 persons each) to planning services for, with and by the person "targeted to be served." For example:

"Supportive living represents a movement within the (intellectual and) developmental disabilities field to provide support services in regular housing to adults with disabilities. Direct support services can be provided by paid staff, including live-in roommates or boarders, paid neighbors, a person hired as an attendant, a support worker or personal assistant, as well as more traditional agency and (modified) shift(live-in) staffing. Professionals, friends, families, and other "informal supports" can also assist people to live in their homes. Supported living may be joined to a movement toward decent, affordable and accessible housing."

Supported living in the US has multiple known origins, including:

- The development of a service category of community living for people deemed capable of more independent living (also known as semi-independent living).
- As a major reform initiative in the US to provide more choices, more integrated and more regular homes and apartments for people with the "most severe disabilities".
- As part of organizational studies during that period (i.e., programs, agencies, and to some extent, state, regional and county systems), including differentiating family support for children and supportive living for adults.
- As state reform and development to a supportive living approach, involving new service structures, program development and financing.
- As a federal initiative to define and fund supportive living (and services and supports, such as personal care, respite care, environmental modifications, case management, chore services, companion services, skilled nursing, supportive living coach).
- As provider and agency accounts, and organizational development (e.g., leadership, person-centered, individualized and flexible support services).
- As part of the movement toward direct support professional and community support workers in the US and other countries such as Canada.
- As parent and "service user" accounts of supported living, homes and support services, and as linking with self-advocacy efforts in states in the US.
- As linking with independent living as supportive living in the community for "special population groups" or persons then "deemed in need of institutional settings", including nursing homes.

=== Evolution of the concept ===
Supported living also developed along different trend lines in the US, two of which included a broadening of the community living concepts in the new community paradigms of community membership of support and empowerment of conversion from an institutional to a community paradigm of person-centered planning of community regeneration (and neighborhood assets) and the service system change to housing, homes and personal assistance and supports in quality community living. Supportive living was an ally of independent living to assure that special population groups could also obtain the benefits of IL services and concepts.

==== Community participation ====
First, part of leadership (e.g., federal financing, state leaders, agency providers, knowledge dissemination networks) was back to the broadened concept of "community living" based on emerging concepts and practices in "community participation." Supported living linked with the concepts of integrated recreation, inclusive education with community opportunities, community membership, self-determination, "community seeding", "person-centered", and personalized supports. This resulted in projects such as the Community Opportunities Project of the Louisiana Developmental Disabilities Council, which were based on roles and relationships such as: Paul becoming a church member, fiancée, health club member, good neighbor, regular at Fred's Country Western and coffee shop, and self-advocate with statewide recognition.

==== Supportive living ====
Second, the concept of supportive living was broadened from a service category of a residential program (i.e., facility-based program model with bundled services) to bridge the gap toward the independent living concept of housing and personal assistance services (health-funded), the concept of regular homes with the availability of "intensive support services" (special population groups, "severe disabilities"), a "range of community support services" (e.g., community counseling, recreation support personnel), decent community life (e.g., community employment, financial security), and principles of community and self-determination/choice.

This agency and systems change work was based on the identification of leading practice of organizations supporting people with disabilities in the community, including the following program design components: the separation of housing and support, home ownership and leasing, individualized and flexible supports, and individual choice. This program design requires "service coordination/case management/service broker/support facilitator", "individualized funding" and "person-centered approaches to planning and supports". This framework has been used in the design of a person-centered course in community services and frames the supported/ive living approach of university doctoral students to graduates.

==== Housing and "homes of our own" ====
Generally, though the focus remained on making people's places into "homes of their own" which became a federal initiative to also explore other housing and support options on the local levels.

On the service configuration and program design levels, a multi-case study research design was used to explore the five identified characteristics of a "housing and support" approach: the separation of housing and support, "home ownership", including tenancy, close tie among assessment, individual planning and individualized funding, and flexible and individualized support services, and choice. Separate developments were proceeding on personal assistance services which began with the independent living movement led by leaders such as now Honorable Judith E. Heumann and late Ed Roberts; it remains current today (E.g., Center for Personal Assistance Services in the US of San Francisco State University, California; then the Rehabilitation Research and Training Center on Center for Personal Assistance Services of the World Institute on Disability, 1990).

A state policy study in South Dakota explored the relationship of state systems change necessary to move to a full range of regular housing and support options from the current facility-based service design in comparison to modifying the current small apartment/home structures such as those in Connecticut. To date, there is no evidence of this type of systems transformation in the US (as of 2012)though we have moved to reporting on homes of one's own, personal assistance services and supportive living approaches, including over 189,000 participants of the latter two categories.

In 2013, Robert Agranoff reported in the "Public Administration Review", that leading state systems in the US (in Intellectual and Developmental Disabilities) indicated an 80-90% conversion from a large institutional system to small, dispersed community homes and services in the community. These changes were based on efforts in states which involved major organizational changes in the NGO (non-profit agency) sectors (e.g., Fratangelo, 1994), and with variability in state government public policies, departments and financing (e.g., Braddock, Hemp & Rizzolo, 2008).

== Community support standards in the US ==
Supportive living in the US is an important movement within the context of decades of federal policies, sometimes reluctantly, for community support services in communities nationwide as part of community integration, community participation, independent living and inclusion. This movement has been accompanied by a strong emphasis on self-determination, with roots in rehabilitation in the 1950s and also, in education in the 2000s.

In the 1990s, this movement emphasized the skill standards of personnel, including direct service workers who were called "human service workers" and their "community managers" (2013, Department of Labor statistics). Increasingly, in 2013 with the consumer-directed services developed in these fields, education and training standards are being revamped within the context of the new US Direct Support Workforce and the Centers for Medicaid and Medicare.

== Community living ==
The term community living was an outgrowth of the development of "residential services" in the communities in the US (e.g., Wolfensberger, Racino, Bersani, Nisbet, Taylor, and Bogdan of Syracuse University, Graduate Studies in Education, 600), and a departure from the development of institutional facilities. As part of this development and growth, different typologies of these services occurred beginning with group homes, staffed apartments, foster care, and then a variety of new and innovative services such as early intervention, family support services, supportive living and "related services" (e.g., supported employment, supported housing). Today, community living may involve over 43 residential typologies (e.g., Pynoos, Feldman & Ahrens, 2004), including board and care homes, personal care homes, nursing facilities, independent living facilities, supportive living and homeownership, family caregiving, personal assistance services, medical homes, and for elders, assisted living facilities.

== In the United Kingdom ==
Supported living is the term given by local authorities in the United Kingdom to encompass a range of services designed to help citizens with disabilities retain their independence in their local community.

Previously, housing and support were usually provided by a charity or local council. Now mentally and physically disabled people can live in their own home and have personal support provided by another organisation or by hiring a personal assistant (paid visiting or live-in carer).

As of 2009, the government in the UK expected "local councils to give people with learning disabilities a genuine opportunity to choose between housing, care and support options that include:

- Supportive living.
- Small-scale ordinary housing.
- Village or intentional communities." (p. 73)

In the research and development sector, the UK has been a leader in supportive living residences and group homes, and in a concept and practice termed active support as part of community integration.

"Supportive living" in the "Valuing People, 21st Century" report defined this approach as: "concerned with designing services round the particular needs and wishes of individuals and is less likely to result in housing and support that is designed around congregate living. Department of Health research has shown that supported living is associated with people having greater overall choice and a wider range of community activities." (p. 73)

=== Teams in the UK ===
Local supported living teams can advise what supported housing is available in any given area. Other assistance may include:

- a personal assistant or other care services
- Direct Payments to pay for privately sourced care services
- mobility equipment
- home adaptations
- security
- emergency call centre
- meals on wheels

== International collaborations ==
As Linda Ward (1995) wrote in her edited text on "Values and Visions: Changing Ideas in Services for People with Learning Difficulties", "the flaws of the "group home model" were recognised sooner in the USA than the UK." (p. 12). Termed "supportive living", she says these developments have been richly documented by Racino, Walker, O'Connor, & Taylor (1993). Written at the time of the nine-state pilots by the federal government on Community Supported Living Arrangements in the US, she noted great interstate variability in what it was and did identify the primary principles near the 1991 national organizational study (separation of housing and support, one individual at a time, full user choice and control, rejecting no one, and a focus on relationships, with maximum use of informal support and community resources). For comparisons, about the same time, Paul Williams (1995) identified the residential services available in Great Britain, including life sharing, hostels, staffed houses, living alone, lodgings, family placements, group homes, living with families, short-term care, hospitals and village communities, among others.

One of the most important initiatives of the 1980s and 1990s on homes and community living in the United Kingdom was the "influential paper "An Ordinary Life"" which was shared in the US through our internationally known colleague David Towell, then of the King's Fund and Great Britain's National Development Team. One of his books, An Ordinary Life in Practice, was paired with his strategic framework for principled national change. Within the comprehensive book (1988), Richard Brazil and Nan Carle describe an ordinary home life, Linda Ward describes developing opportunities for an ordinary community life, Paul Williams and Alan Tyne values for service development (normalization-based, Wolf Wolfensberger), Alice Etherington, Keven Hall & Emma Whelan as service users (where I live, where I work), Philippa Russell on children and families, Jan Porterfield on regular employment, the late James Mansell on training, David Towell on managing strategic change, and Roger Blunden on safeguarding quality, among others.

In 2013, the current framework is inclusive and sustainable housing and communities, similar in both the US and UK with sustainability worldwide. In 2017, these inclusion initiatives were discussed in relationship to community integration theories at the American Society for Public Administration in Atlanta, Georgia. (Racino, Rolandi, Huston, & Begman, 2017)

Canadians, while not typically using the term supported living which is current in the US, were partners in the institution to community movement which included the "reallocation of some funds toward support and services for community living options" (Prince, 2002). Termed in historical texts, the deinstitutionalization movement, the Nordic countries, and New Zealand and Australia, were early partners in community development.
