= Lewis Sargentich =

American law professor

Lew Sargentich
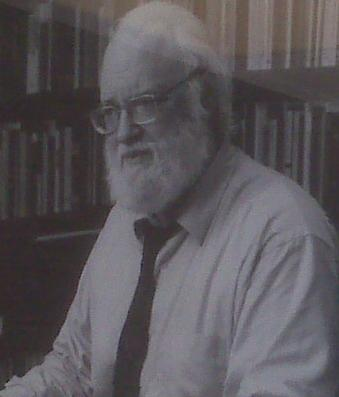
- Born: February 15, 1944 (age 82); Alhambra, California, U.S.
- Education: Occidental College; University of Sussex; Harvard University
- Occupations: Law Professor, Harvard Law School
- Years active: 1973–present

Lewis Daniel "Lew" Sargentich (born 1944) is an American legal scholar. He has been a professor at Harvard Law School since 1973, where he teaches courses tort law and jurisprudence. Sargentich is well known for his record as a student at Harvard Law School, where he both named and first analyzed the First Amendment "overbreadth doctrine" in a student note.

He co-authored the popular tort law casebook Tort and Accident Law: Cases and Materials with Gregory Keating and Robert Keeton.

== Biography ==
=== Early life ===
He grew up in Alhambra, California, and is the son of Peggy and Daniel Sargentich, a first-generation American. His brother, Thomas O. Sargentich, was a professor at American University School of law. He also has two sisters, Sue Sargentich and Karen Sargentich Stafford.

He attended Alhambra High School, where he was an acclaimed student orator. He won both the prestigious National Forensic League Boys Domestic Extemporaneous Speaking tournament and the Lions Club National Speaker Contest in 1961. He then attended and graduated from Occidental College. He received a Marshall Scholarship to study at Sussex University then graduated from Harvard Law School in 1965.

Sargentich was one of only eight Harvard Law School students to receive the summa cum laude designation at Harvard Law from 1969–2007 when the designation was determined by a grade point average threshold. While earning this distinction, Sargentich gained his first exposure to his future field of tort law in a course on the subject taught by Robert Keeton, in which he received a grade of A+. In 1970, Sargentich first analyzed and named the First Amendment "Overbreadth Doctrine" (83 Harv. L. Rev. 844). The article was widely acclaimed, and earned him tenure from the school before he had published any works professionally.

=== Legal career ===
Sargentich was a law clerk for Justice Thurgood Marshall of the United States Supreme Court in 1970–71. He clerked during the height of the Vietnam War protest era, when the Court was on security alert from time to time. A confidential memo to justices from fellow clerk E. Robert Seaver, dated May 3, 1971, warned ominously that "further trouble [i.e., an alert] is expected tomorrow morning". The memo laid out the security measures that executive-branch employees were using, including leaving the office early "to avoid a heavy rush-hour traffic and further trouble with the demonstrators". The memo also said: "The key executives in the executive branch are being told that if they want to avoid possible delays they should be in their offices by 6 a.m." Next to that sentence is a hand-drawn line, leading to a note at the bottom, apparently written by Marshall himself which read: "Not germane to law clerk Sargentich!!!"

Asked about the note, Sargentich laughed loudly. "That was the justice, all right", he said. That year, Sargentich recalls, "I always strolled in rather late, and then worked very late. Getting in at 6 a.m.? I'm barely moving at that hour". Reflecting on his time as a clerk, Sargentich once commented that Justice Marshall "always was a person who believed in liberal values and who believed in the law and its service to the world".

After clerking, Sargentich worked as staff counsel for the Washington Research Project for a year. He then worked for a year as associate general counsel for the United Mine Workers in Washington. He currently teaches jurisprudence and torts at Harvard Law; he became a lecturer at the school in 1973 at the age of 29, an assistant professor in 1974, and a full professor in 1979. Listing him as "One of 10 Professors to Take" in 2003, the Harvard Law Record noted that "[a]s the legal academy focuses increasingly on the intersection of law and politics, economics, race, literature, Sargentich stands tall as a steadfast expositor of the philosophical roots of law". His other activities at Harvard while a professor have included chairing Harvard's international graduate program.

He is commonly cited for his unpublished manuscript Complex Enforcement written in March 1978 and on file at the Harvard Law School Library. On October 16, 1983, the New York Times published a letter co-written by Sargentich and fellow Harvard law professors Duncan Kennedy and Richard Parker responding to adverse media reaction to George McGovern's announcement of his presidential candidacy. The letter provides a rare window into Sargentich's political leanings. It states in part:

"What makes McGovern different is just this: He moved his party not to the right but to the left - and he seeks to move it to the left again. That, it seems to us, is reason enough to support his candidacy."

His latest book is Liberal Legality: A Unified Theory of Our Law, published by Cambridge University Press in April 2018.

=== Personal life ===
Sargentich is married to Valerie Bradley, the long-time president of the Human Services Research Institute, an organization involved in assisting states and the federal government to enhance services and supports to people with mental illness and people with intellectual disabilities. Sarge's apparent technological backwardness was once satirized in a Harvard Law Record April Fools' Day article quoting (a fictional version of) Sargentich as saying "I still don't fully understand what the Internet even is, your world frightens and confuses [me]".

== See also ==
- List of law clerks for the tenth seat of the Supreme Court of the United States
