= Ted Lipman =

Canadian diplomat (born 1953)

Ted Lipman (born 1953) is a former Canadian diplomat. He served in numerous roles including ambassador to North Korea and South Korea.

== Life and career ==
Lipman graduated from the University of British Columbia and studied for one year at Peking University.

In 1976, he became a member of the Canadian Department of External Affairs. Positions held by him there have included special projects liaison in the Corporate Planning Division, deputy director of the East Asia Trade Division, and director general of the North Asia Bureau.

Lipman's first work in Asia was to serve the Canadian embassy in Beijing from 1977 to 1980. He then became the first Canadian trade commissioner in South China from 1982 to 1985. Other positions held by Lipman include Canadian consul general in Shanghai from 1995 to 1999, and minister at the Canadian embassy in Beijing between 1999 and 2001. He became executive director of the Canadian Trade Office in Taipei in 2001, and held that position until 2004.

In 2011, Lipman retired from the diplomatic service. Subsequent to his diplomatic career, for almost a decade, he served as CEO of the Robert H. N. Ho Family Foundation, a leading Hong Kong-based philanthropy supporting culture, academia and Buddhism. He currently is the director of a consultancy and design firm based in Hong Kong.

== Family ==
Lipman is married to Chinese singer Zhu Zheqin, better known by her artist name Dadawa. His sister is Canadian actress Nicola Lipman.
