= Canadian International School of Hong Kong =

Private school in Hong Kong

- 香港加拿大國際學校

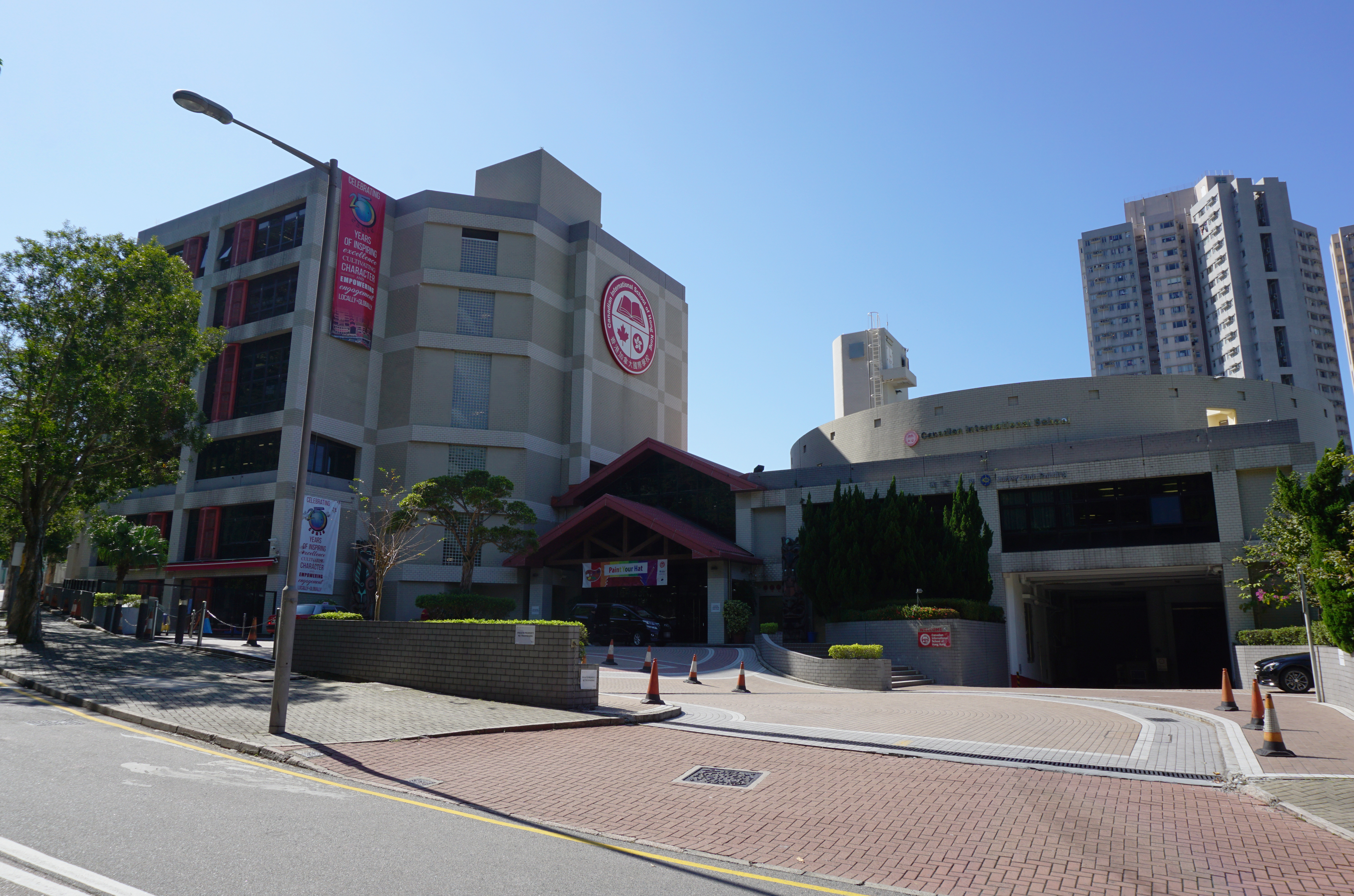

Location
- 36 Nam Long Shan Road, Aberdeen; Hong Kong; 22°14′33″N 114°10′02″E

Information
- Type: Private, Comprehensive, International, Primary, Secondary, Co-educational
- Motto: To inspire excellence, cultivate character, and empower engagement locally and globally.
- Established: 1991
- School district: Southern District, Hong Kong
- Principal: Dr. Wil Chan (Lower school); Dr. David Butler (Upper school)
- Head of school: Dr. Tim Kaiser
- Staff: 340
- Faculty: 280+
- Grades: Nursery – Grade 12
- Enrollment: 2200
- Education system: International Baccalaureate, Ontario Secondary School Diploma
- Campus size: 42,337 metres (138,901 ft)
- Colour
- Athletics: Timberwolves
- Athletics conference: South East Asia Student Activities Conference
- Mascot: Timberwolves
- Website: cdnis.edu.hk

Canadian International School of Hong Kong
- Traditional Chinese: 香港加拿大國際學校
- Simplified Chinese: 香港加拿大国际学校
Transcriptions
Standard Mandarin
- Hanyu Pinyin: Xiānggǎng Jiānádà Guójì Xuéxiào
Yue: Cantonese
- Yale Romanization: Hēung góng gā nàh daaih gwok jai hohk haauh
- Jyutping: Hoeng1 gong2 gaa1 naa4 daai6 gwok3 zai3 hok6 haau6

Canadian International School of Hong Kong (CDNIS) is an international school in Aberdeen, Hong Kong. Founded in 1991, the school provides an education for over 2,200 students representing more than 40 nationalities from Nursery to Grade 12.

== Curriculum ==
CDNIS is one of eight International Baccalaureate (IB) World Schools in Hong Kong authorized to deliver three IB programs – the Diploma Program (DP), Middle Years Program (MYP) and Primary Years Program (PYP). In addition to the IB Diploma Program, students are also eligible to receive the Ontario Secondary School Diploma upon graduation.

The language of instruction is English, with Mandarin, French, and Spanish taught as second languages.

== Lower School ==
The Principal of the Lower School is Dr. Wil Chan. Students from Nursery to Grade 5 are part of the Lower School and make-up just over 55% of the student body. Students in Nursery and Early Years 1 attend school for either the morning or afternoon session, while Early Years 2 to Grade 5 students attend school all-day.

Students as young as two and three-years-old attend the half-day Nursery and Early Years 1 programs at the CDNIS Early Years Centre at THE SOUTHSIDE. While the International Baccalaureate's Primary Years Program (PYP) is used from Nursery, students in Nursery to Grade 1 are also part of the bilingual program. The program will expand one grade level each academic year until reaching Grade 5 in 2028/2029. In August 2024, the school opened its CDNIS Early Years Centre at THE SOUTHSIDE, a purpose-built environment for the school's youngest learners.

== Upper School ==
The Upper School consists of students from Grades 6 to 12, with a current enrollment of just over 1,000 students, making up almost 45% of the student body. Students in Grades 6–10 take part in the Middle Years Program (MYP), while students in Grade 11–12 take part in the Diploma Program (DP). The Principal of the Upper School is Dr. David Butler.

Starting in August 2020, CDNIS began the Middle Years Program (MYP) in Grade 6.

CDNIS has one of the largest DP cohorts in Hong Kong. 99% of the 103 students in the Class of 2024, the 14th cohort of IB graduates, were awarded the IB Diploma. Two students were awarded a maximum of 45 points out of 45, while 43 students achieved a score of 40 or above. The Class of 2024 IB score average was 38 points.

== History ==
Canadian International School of Hong Kong was founded in 1991 by a group of Canadians living in Hong Kong who volunteered their time to establish an international school offering the Canadian curriculum. When the school first opened its doors to the first 81 students, the school campus was located in a small rented facility in Causeway Bay.

By 1994 it became popular with international families wishing to expose their children to Chinese languages in their education.

The school continued to grow, and by 1999 has reached the "through-train" objective, providing education from Reception to Grade 12. The school produced its first graduates at the end of the 1998/1999 school year. During the 1999 school year, Canadian International School moved to its present location Aberdeen and in August 2024, opened its second campus - the CDNIS Early Years Centre - at THE SOUTHSIDE. CDNIS is a non-profit organization.

The Head of School is Dr. Tim Kaiser. The school celebrated its 25th anniversary during the 2016–2017 school year. The school received its full IB re-authorization in 2018 and full CIS/WASC accreditation in 2018. Over the summer of 2019, the school installed 349 solar panels on two of the school's roofs - making CDNIS’ photovoltaic farm the smallest solar farm of any school on Hong Kong Island.

=== Construction of Aberdeen Campus ===
The school campus, designed by Canadian architect Norman Grey-Noble, was built in three main phases over a period of several decades. The first phase, often referred to as the main building and used mainly by the Upper School, includes floors one to nine completed in 1999. A swimming pool is on the first floor, two gymnasiums and an outdoor playground are on the third floor, a design studio, the main school cafeteria and another outdoor playing surface, which is covered in artificial turf, is on the sixth floor and the main school office is on the ninth floor.

The second phase, which was finished in 2002, is used mainly by the Lower School and includes floors nine to 14. Besides numerous classrooms, this area also includes the school library, a science and innovation lab (The Hive), a covered playground on the 11th floor, and another cafeteria on the 12th floor. The third phase, the Leo Lee Arts Centre (LLAC), was completed in the spring of 2008. The LLAC is a HK$100 million facility with a 604-seat auditorium and teaching facilities for design, architecture, dance and visual arts. The fourth phase includes the Green Roof Garden and Chinese Cultural Centre, which were completed in August 2015 In August 2019, the school created the Early Year Environment (EYE) and installed 349 solar panels to create the 2nd smallest Photovoltaic Farm on Hong Kong Island. Following the summer of 2020, the school unveiled its newly renovated main cafeteria and its newly renovated spaces for Grade 5 and 6 students as part of its Transition Years Program. In August 2024, the school opened its second campus - the CDNIS Early Years Centre - at THE SOUTHSIDE. This campus is for CDNIS' Nursery and Early Years programs.

== Curriculum ==
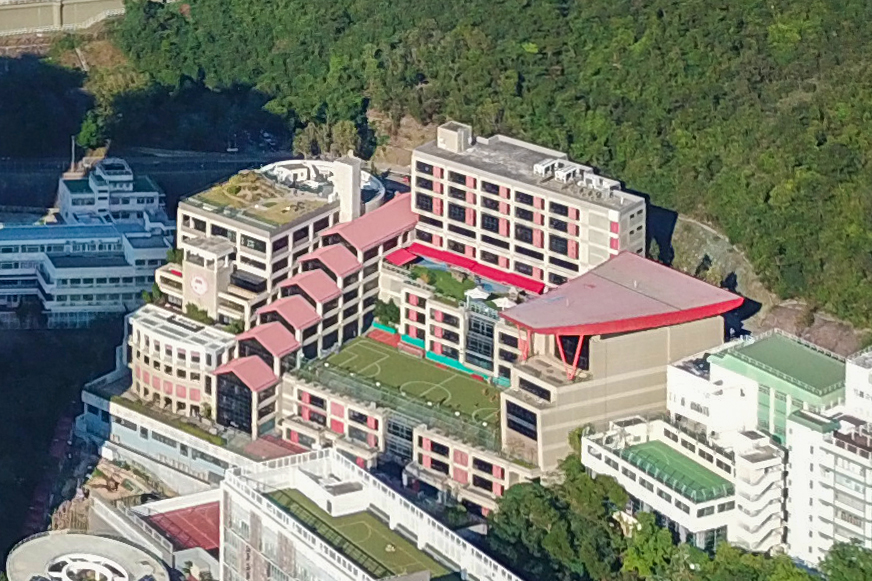
Aerial view of the school

By 1994 the school added studies of Chinese culture to its curricula, and the school had instruction in the Mandarin language.

== Notable alumni ==
- Raz Gal-Or - Israeli social media figure active in China
- Richard Juan, actor, TV host, film producer and entrepreneur
- Matt Orr, professional footballer for China League One side Guangxi Pingguo
- Clement Benhaddouche, professional footballer for China League One side Heilongjiang
- Brett Warning, formier professional footballer for Southern District RSA
- Oscar Coggins, professional triathlete and Olympian representing Hong Kong, China

== See also ==
- Canadians in Hong Kong
- Consulate General of Canada in Hong Kong and Macao
