= Taipei Economic and Cultural Office, Ottawa =

De facto embassy of Taiwan in Canada

Taipei Economic and Cultural Office in Canada
- 駐加拿大台北經濟文化代表處; Bureau économique et culturel de Taïpei au Canada
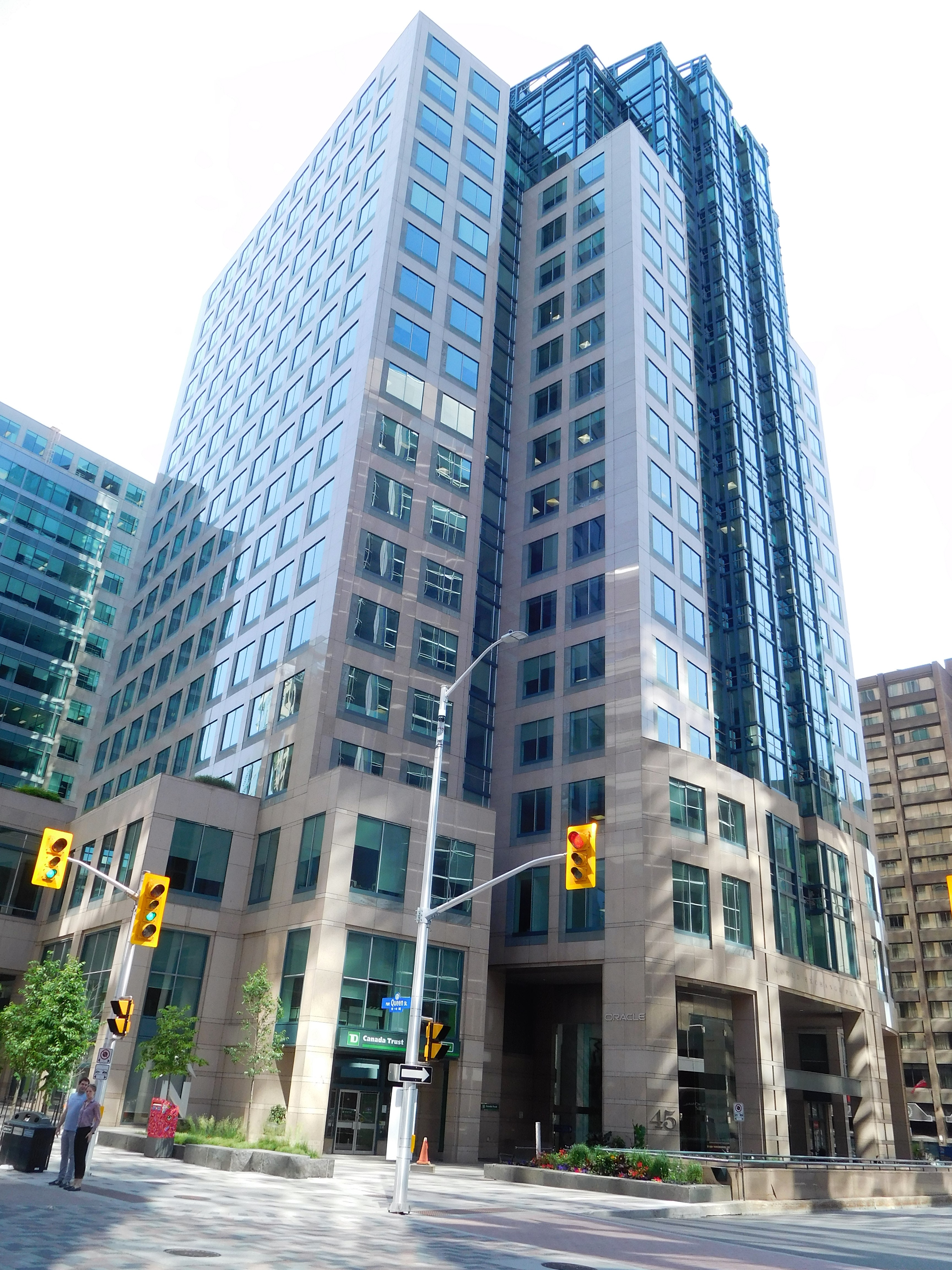

Agency overview
- Formed: October 22, 1991
- Jurisdiction: Canada
- Headquarters: 1960 – 45 O'Connor Street Ottawa, ON K1P 1A4 Canada
- Agency executive: Tseng Ho-jen, Representative
- Website: www.roc-taiwan.org/ca_en/index.html

The Taipei Economic and Cultural Office in Canada (Chinese: 駐加拿大臺北經濟文化代表處; pinyin: Zhù Jiānádà Táiběi Jīngjì Wénhuà Dàibiǎo Chù; French: Bureau économique et culturel de Taïpei au Canada), also called TECO Canada, is the representative office of the Republic of China (Taiwan) in Canada. Located in Ottawa, the office functions as a de facto embassy in the absence of formal diplomatic relations between Canada and Taiwan.

The office is headed by a representative serving as the de facto ambassador to Canada. Additional branch offices are located in Toronto, Vancouver and Montreal. The Ottawa office handles passport and visa issues for the National Capital Region, Newfoundland and Labrador and Saint-Pierre and Miquelon, while the branch offices handle needs in the rest of Canada.

The counterpart Canadian office in Taiwan is the Canadian Trade Office in Taipei.

== Divisions ==
- Public Affairs Division
- Services Division
- Education Division
- Economic Division
- Information Division
- Science and Technology Division

== Branches ==
- Toronto: Yonge-Richmond Centre (Suite 501, 151 Yonge Street)
- Vancouver: The Scotia Tower (Suite 2200, 650 West Georgia Street)
- Montreal: Bell Media Tower (#2310, 1800 Avenue McGill College)

== List of representatives ==
- Jason Yuan (1994–1996)
- David Lee (2007–2012)
- Liu Chih-kung (2012–2014)
- Bruce Linghu (2014–2015)
- Wu Rong-chuan (2015–2016)
- Kung Chung-chen (2016–2018)
- Winston Chen (2018-2022)
- Tseng Ho-jen (since 2022)

== See also ==
- Canada–Taiwan relations
- Taipei Economic and Cultural Representative Office
