= Hong Kong Canadians =

Canadians of Hong Kong ancestry

Total population
- Hong Kong–born Canadians (2021 census): 213,855
- Ethnic Hongkonger Canadians (Note: I.e., those who responded "Hongkonger" when asked what their ethnic identity was.) (2021 census): 81,680

Regions with significant populations
- Greater Toronto Area, Metro Vancouver

Languages
- Cantonese, English, French

Religion
- Chinese folk religions, Buddhism, Christianity, Taoism

Related ethnic groups
- Chinese Canadians, Taiwanese Canadians

Hong Kong Canadians
- Chinese: 香港裔加拿大人
- Jyutping: Hoeng^{1}gong^{2} jeoi^{6} Gaa^{1}naa^{4}daai^{6} jan^{4}
Transcriptions
Standard Mandarin
- Hanyu Pinyin: Xiānggǎng yì Jiānádà rén
Yue: Cantonese
- Jyutping: Hoeng^{1}gong^{2} jeoi^{6} Gaa^{1}naa^{4}daai^{6} jan^{4}

Alternative Chinese name
- Chinese: 加拿大港人
- Jyutping: Gaa^{1}naa^{4}daai^{6} Gong^{2} jan^{4}
Transcriptions
Standard Mandarin
- Hanyu Pinyin: Jiānádà Gǎng rén
Yue: Cantonese
- Jyutping: Gaa^{1}naa^{4}daai^{6} Gong^{2} jan^{4}

Hong Kong Canadians, or Hong Konger–Canadians, are Canadians who were born or raised in Hong Kong, hold permanent residency in Hong Kong, or trace their ancestry back to Hong Kong. In Canada, the majority of Hong Kong Canadians reside in the metropolitan areas of Toronto and Vancouver. Many Hong Kong Canadians continue to maintain their status as Hong Kong permanent residents.

The largest wave of immigration to Canada from Hong Kong occurred during the late 1980s and early 1990s, as a result of the uncertainties concerning the handover of Hong Kong from the United Kingdom to China in 1997. In the decades that followed the handover of Hong Kong, a number of Hong Kong Canadians have moved back to the territory.

== History ==
=== 20th century ===
Most Hong Kong Canadians are immigrants or descendants of Chinese migrants who settled in Canada from the late 1970s. However, a minority of Hongkongers migrated to Canada during the 1950s and 1960s.

In 1984, the Sino-British Joint Declaration was signed, finalizing an agreement between the British and Chinese governments to transfer and reorganize Hong Kong as a Special Administrative Region of the People's Republic of China on July 1, 1997. Anxiety over the impending handover sparked a large wave of emigration from Hong Kong to the Anglosphere between 1984 and 1997. One of the most popular destinations chosen by Hong Kong emigrants of the time was Canada, where thousands of Hongkongers settled in Greater Toronto and Metro Vancouver. According to the Canadian International Council, approximately 335,646 Hongkongers moved to Canada between 1984 and 1997. The immigration of Hongkongers to Canada peaked in 1994, with 44,271 Hongkongers migrating to the country in that year alone.

A number of Hong Kong family units that moved to Canada during the 1990s were examples of an astronaut family, where most of the family unit was based in Canada, but one parent continued to live and work in Hong Kong.

=== 21st century ===
The early 21st century saw a "reverse migration" of Hongkongers, with a number of Hongkongers who migrated to Canada prior to the handover returning to the territory during the late 1990s and early 2000s. Many of those who returned to the territory did so for financial opportunities. The resulting "reverse migration" saw the number of Hong Kong-born Canadian residents drop between 1996 and 2011.

However the trend reversed again during the 2010s, with the number of Hong Kong-born Canadians living in Canada increasing between 2011 and 2016 Canadian census. Hong Kong-born Canadians who moved back to Canada in the 2010s cited a variety of reasons for returning to Canada; including personal reasons, as well as political reasons. The increase in the number of returning Hong Kong Canadians has also been attributed to those who are returning to Canada to retire, after they moved back to Hong Kong for employment in the late 1990s. In addition to returning Hong Kong-born Canadians, the 2016 Canadian Census also reported an increase in the number of new migrants from Hong Kong that became permanent residents in Canada. According to Immigration, Refugees and Citizenship Canada, new visa applications from Hongkongers increased by 20 per cent to 10,819 in 2020.

On November 12, 2020, Marco Mendicino, the Canadian Minister of Immigration, increased measures to expediate the process for Hong Kong residents to resettle in Canada as students, workers, and permanent residents. A new work-permit scheme was introduced in Canada in February 2021, that targeted young professionals who earned a postsecondary degree or diploma in the past five years from an institution recognized in Canada.

For the 2021 Canadian census, a group of Hong Kong Canadians launched a campaign across Canada to encourage the Canadian government to recognize Hongkongers as an official identity, and for Hong Kong Canadians to write-in Hongkonger as their ethnic origin and Cantonese as one of their spoken language. Earlier censuses did not provide Hongkonger as an option, and anyone who noted it on the census form was grouped as Chinese. Hongkonger was later included in the 2021 census as an ethnicity. A total of 81,680 people identified "Hong Konger" as their ethnic origin, while 213,855 people listed their place of birth as Hong Kong.

Olivia Chow, born in British Hong Kong, became the first Chinese-Canadian mayor of Toronto in July 2023, following the 2023 Toronto mayoral by-election.

== Demographics ==
The 2016 Canadian census reported that only 215,775 Canadians residing in Canada were born in Hong Kong. The number of Hong Kong-born Canadians living in Canada peaked in 1996, with 241,095 Hong Kong-born Canadians reported in that year's census. Between 1996 and 2011, the number of Hong Kong-born Canadians dropped as many Hong Kong-Canadians chose to return to Hong Kong during the 2000s. From 2011 to 2016, the number of Hong Kong-born Canadians residing in Canada increased again.

In 2006, among the 790,035 speakers of any variety of Chinese, 300,590 were speakers of Cantonese. According to 2001 statistics, 44% of Cantonese speakers were born in Hong Kong, 27% were born in Guangdong, and 18% were born in Canada. Among the Cantonese speakers who were born in Guangdong, a large percentage immigrated from Hong Kong.

=== Canadians expatriates in Hong Kong ===
Hong Kong boasts the second-largest community of Canadians living abroad, second only to Canadians residing in the United States. There were approximately 300,000 Canadians living in Hong Kong in 2011. Most of these Canadians are dual nationals originating from Hong Kong who migrated to Canada prior to the handover of the territory. A number of Hongkongers eventually returned to the territory after acquiring Canadian citizenship.

A 2011 report from the Asia Pacific Foundation of Canada, found that the majority of Canadians living in Hong Kong have only resided in Canada for four or five years. However, 7 in 10 Canadians living in Hong Kong have family living in Canada; with more than 60 per cent of Canadians living in the territory stating they have plans to return to Canada at some point in the future. The same study also found that 46 per cent of Canadians living in Hong Kong considered Canada their home "sometimes" or "all the time," while 37 per cent of Hong Kong-born Canadians stated they would "never" consider Canada home.

== See also ==
- Consulate General of Canada in Hong Kong
- East Asian Canadians
- History of Chinese immigration to Canada
- List of Chinese Canadians
