= Consulate General of Canada in Hong Kong and Macao =

Canadian Consulate General in Hong Kong

Consulate General of Canada in Hong Kong and Macao Consulat Général du Canada à Hong Kong et Macao
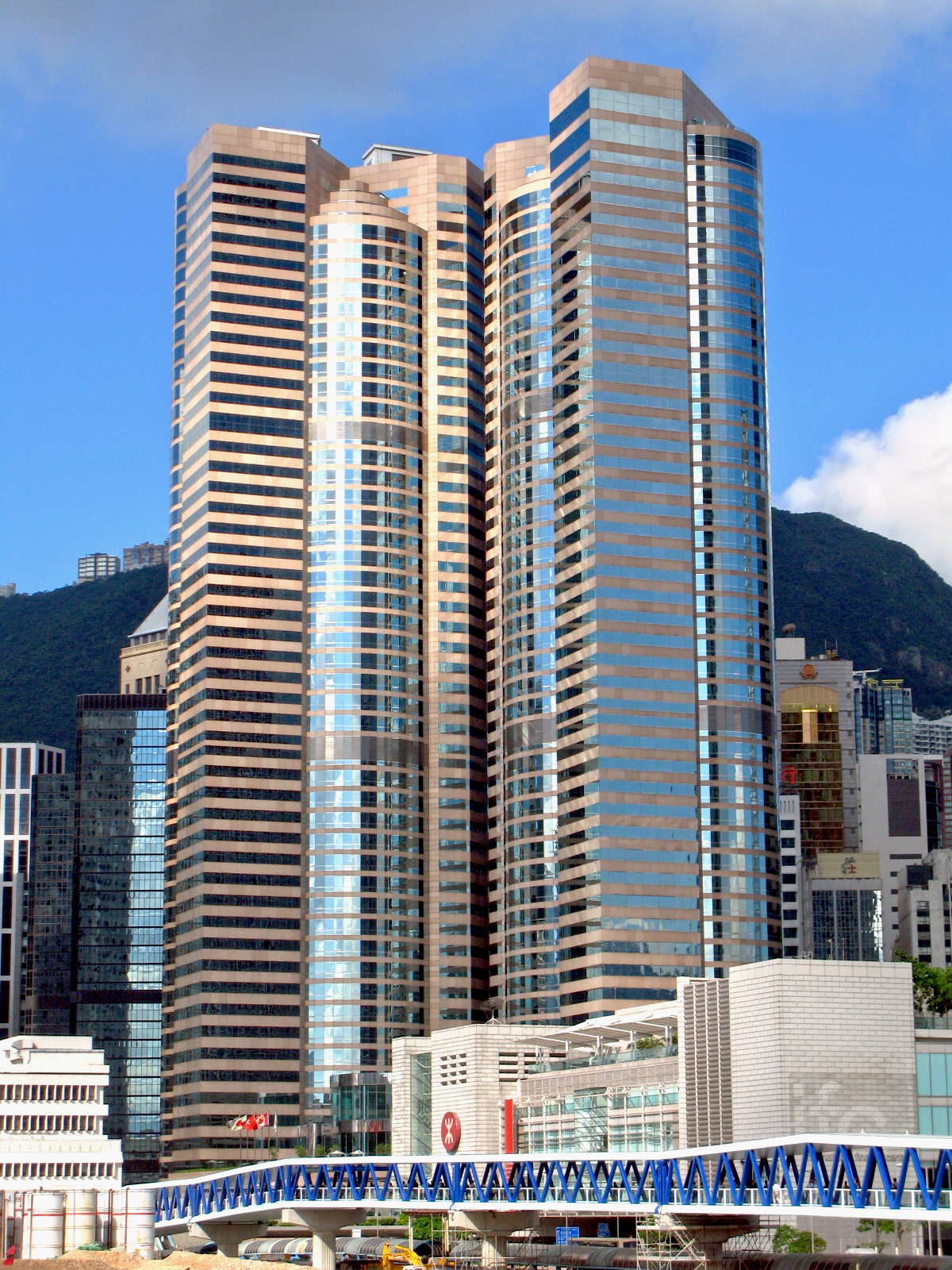
- Exchange Square, the location of the Consulate General
- Address: Tower 3, Floor 5 Exchange Square; 8 Connaught Place; Central, Hong Kong
- Coordinates: 22°17′02″N 114°09′32″E
- Jurisdiction: Hong Kong; Macau
- Consul General: Rachael Bedlington
- Website: www.international.gc.ca/country-pays/hong_kong/hong_kong.aspx

Consulate General of Canada in Hong Kong and Macao

Chinese name
- Traditional Chinese: 加拿大駐香港及澳門總領事館
- Simplified Chinese: 加拿大驻香港及澳门总领事馆
Transcriptions
Standard Mandarin
- Hanyu Pinyin: Jiānádà zhù Xiānggǎng jí Àomén Zǒnglǐngshìguǎn
Yue: Cantonese
- Jyutping: gaa1 naa4 daai6 zyu3 hoeng1 gong2 kap6 ou3 mun4*2 zung2 ling5 si6 gun2

French name
- French: Consulat général du Canada à Hong Kong et Macao

The Consulate General of Canada in Hong Kong and Macao (French: Consulat général du Canada à Hong Kong et Macao; Chinese: 加拿大駐香港及澳門總領事館) represents Canada in the Hong Kong and Macau Special Administrative Regions of the People's Republic of China. As Hong Kong was linked to the Commonwealth during British administration, Canada's mission was called the Canadian Commission before the transfer of sovereignty to China on July 1, 1997. Since 1980, the Head of Mission in Hong Kong has also served as Consul-General to Macau.

Owing to the special status of Hong Kong and Macau, the Consulate General of Canada reports directly to Global Affairs Canada in Ottawa rather than through the Canadian Embassy in Beijing, although it does work closely with its counterparts at the embassy. Under an agreement signed on September 19, 1996, Ottawa and Beijing agreed that the then Commission, to be called the Consulate General, would continue to operate as regulated by normal diplomatic procedures (such as the 1963 Vienna Convention on Consular Relations).

In common with the missions of most other countries in Hong Kong, the Consulate General does not have its own chancery building. In 1985 it moved located on the 11th to 14th floors in Exchange Square, at 8 Connaught Road Central. These offices provide a base for 23 Canada-based diplomats and 117 locally employed staff delivering a wide variety of services. The office relocated again in 2014 to two locations:

- Office of the Consul-General/Canadian Trade Commissioner Service/Foreign Policy and Diplomacy Service: 5th floor, Tower 3, Exchange Square, 8 Connaught Place
- Consular Section, Immigration Section, Canada Border Services Agency: 9th floor, Berkshire House, 25 Westlands Road, Quarry Bay, Hong Kong
- Administration Section: 8th floor, Berkshire House, 25 Westlands Road, Quarry Bay, Hong Kong

The history of Canadian diplomatic missions in the territory began in 1923 when a Canadian Immigration office was established in Hong Kong. In 1929, Trade Commissioner Paul Sykes opened the Canadian Trade Commission. At the start of World War II (1941), the office was closed, but it reopened in 1946.

The present Consul General is Rachael Bedlington.

The counterpart Hong Kong representation in Canada is the Hong Kong Economic and Trade Office in Toronto.

== Canadian Trade Offices 1936-1980s ==
Trade and immigration offices operated out Trade Commission offices from 1930 to 1980:

- old HongKong and Shanghai Bank Building c. 1935 used until 1941, re-opened in 1946 following the end of Japanese occupation during World War Two.
- P & O Building, 11F, 21-23 Des Voeux Road Central was home to Trade Commission around 1965 (Superintendent of Immigration was at 141 Des Voeux Road in the 1970s) to about late 1970s when the building was slated to be redeveloped.
- Asian House at 1 Hennessy Road was the last relocation from 1970s to 1985.

== List of Consuls General and Commissioners ==
- Rachael Bedlington 2021–Present
- Jeff Nankivell 2016–2021
- J. Ian Burchett 2011-2016
- Doreen Steidle 2008-2011
- Gerry Campbell 2004-2008
- Anthony Burger 2001-2004
- Colin Russel 1997-2001
- Garrett Lambert 1994-1997
- John P. Higginbotham 1989-1994
- Anne Marie Doyle 1986-1989
- Maurice Copithorne 1983-1986
- R. Allen Kilpatrick 1982-1983
- W.T. Warden 1978-1981
- M.G. Clark 1975-1977
- R.L. Wales 1972-1974
- C.R. Gallow 1966-1971
- R.K. Thomson 1963-1965
- C.M. Forsyth-Smith 1957-1962

== See also ==
- Canada–Hong Kong relations
- Canadians in Hong Kong
- Canadian International School of Hong Kong
