= Canadian Trade Office in Taipei =

De facto embassy of Canada in Taiwan

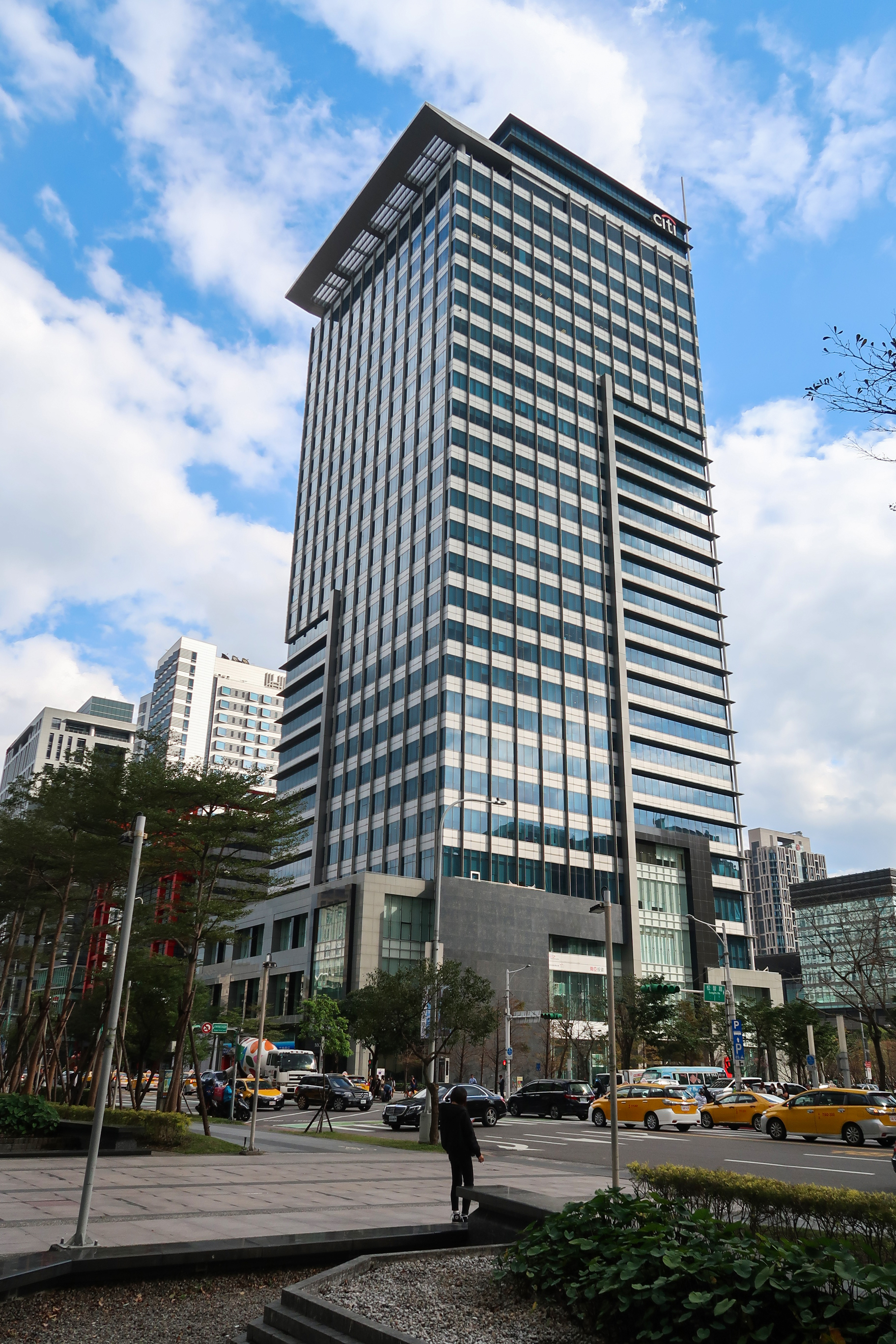
- The Canadian trade office at Walsin Lihwa Building

Agency overview
- Jurisdiction: Republic of China
- Headquarters: 6th Floor, No. 1, Song-Zhi Road, Xinyi, Taipei, Taiwan; 25.0387°N 121.566°E
- Agency executive: Marie-Louise Hannan, Executive Director
- Website: Official website

The Canadian Trade Office in Taipei (CTOT; French: Bureau commercial du Canada à Taipei; Chinese: 加拿大駐臺北貿易辦事處) is Canada's representative office in Taiwan, which functions as a de facto embassy in the absence of official diplomatic relations in which Canada recognized the People's Republic of China in October 1970 in accordance with the "one-China policy".

== History ==
Canada established diplomatic representation with the Republic of China (ROC) in 1942, when it dispatched an ambassador to the temporary capital of Chongqing. The Canadian embassy was moved to Nanking in 1946, where it remained until the city was taken by Communist forces on 23 April 1949. Canada chose not to establish an embassy in Taipei, instead maintaining relations through a trade mission in Manila. Canadian citizens in Taiwan received consular assistance from the British consulate.

Canada and the People's Republic of China (PRC) signed a joint communiqué marking the establishment of diplomatic relations on 13 October 1970, in which Canada recognizes the PRC government as the "sole legal government of China" and "takes note" of China's position that Taiwan is an "inalienable part of the territory" of the PRC. It is the position of the PRC government that countries with which it has diplomatic relations may not also maintain official relations with the Republic of China.

The Canadian trade office started operations on 28 November 1986. Staff were initially drawn from the Canadian Chamber of Commerce, but the office is now under the control of the Government of Canada and staffed by the federal government departments Global Affairs Canada and Citizenship and Immigration Canada. Despite its name, the office does not differ from any other Canadian overseas mission. It does everything from issuing Canadian passports and providing consular services, to promoting trade and investment cooperation and cultural/educational exchanges. In addition, there are also provincial representatives from the Governments of Alberta and British Columbia.

The ROC, likewise, is represented in Canada by the Taipei Economic and Cultural Office in Canada, which has established offices in Ottawa, Toronto, Vancouver and Montreal as de facto embassy and consulate. The Taiwan External Trade Development Council (TAITRA) has operated non-governmental trade offices in Canada since the creation of the Far East Trade Services in Montreal in 1970.

== List of Executive Directors ==
- Robert Kelly (Canadian Chamber of Commerce, 1986–1988);
- John Clayden (Canadian Chamber of Commerce, 1988–1991);
- Ron Berlet (External Affairs Canada 1991–1993, Foreign Affairs Canada 1993 onwards, 1991–1995);
- Hugh Stephens (Foreign Affairs Canada, 1995–1998);
- David Mulroney (Foreign Affairs Canada, 1998–2001); (Note: Mulroney would later serve as the Canadian Ambassador to the PRC from 2009 to 2012.)
- Ted Lipman (Foreign Affairs Canada, 2001–2004);
- Gordon Houlden (Foreign Affairs Canada, 2004–2006);
- Ron MacIntosh (Foreign Affairs Canada, 2006–2009);
- Scott Fraser (Foreign Affairs Canada, 2009–2012);
- Kathleen Mackay (Foreign Affairs Canada, 2012–August 10, 2015);
- Mario Ste-Marie (Global Affairs Canada, 2015–2018);
- Jordan Reeves (Global Affairs Canada, 2018–2022);
- James Stafford Nickel (Global Affairs Canada, 2022-2025)
- Marie-Louise Hannan (Global Affairs Canada, 2025-)

== See also ==
- List of diplomatic missions in Taiwan
- Foreign relations of Canada
- Foreign relations of Taiwan
- Political status of Taiwan
