= Syracuse, New York in fiction =

Syracuse, New York has been portrayed in a range of literary, film and other fictional works.

== Film ==
- Adult World (feature film, 2014) - Starring Emma Roberts, Evan Peters, Cloris Leachman, Shannon Woodward, and John Cusack. Filmed entirely in Syracuse, including the SU campus, the Carrier Dome, the Gear Factory, Recess Coffee, Little Italy, Clinton Square, Phoebe’s restaurant and the upside down traffic light on Tipperary Hill.
- Banana Split (feature film, 2018) - Starring Hannah Marks, Liana Liberato, Dylan Sprouse, and Jessica Hecht. Scenes were filmed at Heid’s ice cream shop — yes, a banana split is served — along with the Palace Theater in Eastwood, a private residence on Sedgwick Drive in Syracuse, and the former A.V. Zogg Middle School in Liverpool, now known as Syracuse Studios.
- Big Daddy (feature film, 1999) - Several mentions; Adam Sandler's character is a Syracuse University alumnus (attended Syracuse University College of Law) and wears various Syracuse sweatshirts and T-shirts.
- Big Time Adolescence (feature film, 2019) - Starring Griffin Gluck, Pete Davidson, Jon Cryer, Sydney Sweeney, and Machine Gun Kelly. The movie was shot in 2018 with scenes at the Palace Theater in Eastwood, Sylvan Beach Amusement Park, the Sound Garden record store in downtown Syracuse, and the former A.V. Zogg Middle School in Liverpool, now known as Syracuse Studios.
- Born on the Fourth of July (feature film, 1989) - Tom Cruise's character attends a Vietnam War protest, which is held at Syracuse University. Tom Cruise was born in Syracuse and has appeared in several films referencing his hometown. This Oliver Stone film also starred Syracuse native Frank Whaley and Stephen Baldwin, whose mother lives in Central New York.
- A Clouded Name (silent film, 1923) - Starring Norma Shearer. Scenes were filmed at the State Fair, the Calthrop mansion, and the Liverpool's solar salt fields (which closed three years later).
- The Commuter (feature film, 2018) - In the opening sequence, Michael MacCauley's (Liam Neeson) teenage son is trying to meet Syracuse University's early-admissions deadline. On the commute back from work that day, he informs a train regular (Vera Farmiga) his son is indeed going to Syracuse. Vera Farmiga is an alumna of Syracuse University.
- Crooked Arrows (feature film, 2012) - Starring Brandon Routh. The story of a Native American lacrosse team in a prep school league tournament, filmed in Central New York with appearances by local lacrosse players and coaches, including SU's John Desko and Gary Gait.
- The Express: The Ernie Davis Story (feature film, 2008) - Starring Rob Brown, Dennis Quaid, Charles S. Dutton and (briefly) Chadwick Boseman. The movie is about Ernie Davis, a Syracuse University football player, who is the first African-American to win the Heisman trophy. Parts of the movie were filmed in Syracuse and the world premiere took place at the Landmark Theatre in Syracuse.
- Freak Talks About Sex (also known as Blowin' Smoke) (feature film, 1999) - Starring Steve Zahn. Filmed in Syracuse; life in Syracuse is part of the plot.
- God Bless America (2011) - Written and directed by Syracuse-born native Bobcat Goldthwait, who shot part of this dark satire featuring Joel Murray (Bill Murray's brother) in Clinton Square, downtown Syracuse.
- Holly Slept Over (feature film, 2017) - Starring Nathalie Emmanuel, Ron Livingston, Josh Lawson, and Britt Lower. Filmed entirely in Syracuse suburbs. First release from Liverpool-based American High.
- Lady in White (feature film, 1988) - Starring Lukas Haas, Len Cariou, Alex Rocco, and Katherine Helmond. Opening sequence filmed in Syracuse Hancock International Airport; much of the rest of the movie was filmed in the villages of Lyons, Newark, and Phelps, approximately 50 miles west of Syracuse.
- Looks That Kill (feature film, 2018) - Starring Brandon Flynn, Julia Goldani Telles, and Ki Hong Lee. Filmed throughout Syracuse and Liverpool in 2018.
- The Purge - 2013 - Syracuse appears in Purge Feed (during the 2017 Purge) in the film's introduction.
- Sid is Dead (feature film, 2019) - Starring Joey Bragg, Jack Griffo, Tyler Alvarez, Genevieve Hannelius, and Mary Stuart Masterson. Filmed in Syracuse suburbs and the American High film hub in Liverpool, New York.
- Slap Shot (feature film, 1977) - Starring Paul Newman and Michael Ontkean. One of the hockey teams is the (fictional) Syracuse Bulldogs, and parts of the movie were filmed at the Onondaga County War Memorial in downtown Syracuse.
- Snow Day (feature film, 2000) - Starring Chevy Chase, Chris Elliott, Mark Webber, Schuyler Fisk, Jean Smart, Iggy Pop, Pam Grier, John Schneider, Josh Peck, Emmanuelle Chriqui, David Paetkau, and Rozonda Thomas ('Chili' from TLC). Syracuse is portrayed as a small village with high snowfall. Filmed in Edmonton and Calgary.

== Television ==
- In the Black Mirror episode "Playtest", Cooper, the protagonist, names Syracuse as his hometown.
- The Detour is a 2016-2019 TBS comedy about a family from Syracuse. The show begins in Syracuse, and one episode of Season 4 is set there, but most of the show takes place in other locations.
- New Girl is a 2011-2018 Fox sitcom in which three male leads went to Syracuse University. Some flashbacks take place in Syracuse.
- The Disney+ series American Born Chinese features a recurring gag in which a fictional reality show called Single in Syracuse appears on television screens, showing the Syracuse skyline including the Equitable Towers and State Tower Building.

- In the science fiction television series The Expanse, Syracuse serves as Earth's emergency capital following a catastrophic asteroid attack on the planet.
- Ordinary Joe is a 2021-2022 NBC drama about a music major from Syracuse University who’s at a crossroads on his graduation day at SU in 2011.
- The Quantum Leap episode "Catch a Falling Star" was set in Syracuse.
- In a sixth season episode of The Sopranos, Syracuse losing a basketball game is mentioned twice— by Fat Dom Gamiello and Christopher Moltisanti's father-in-law, Al Lombardo, respectively.
- In the third season of Star Trek: Picard, the stardrive section of the USS Syracuse, a Galaxy Class starship with registry number NCC-17744, was donated to the saucer section of the USS Enterprise, NCC-1701-D. The entire ship with drive and saucer sections operated under the name Enterprise.
- The short-lived 1993 CBS sitcom The Trouble with Larry, which starred Bronson Pinchot and Courteney Cox, was set in Syracuse. The show was cancelled after three episodes.
- In Unforgettable, two of the main characters (played by Poppy Montgomery and Dylan Walsh) used to work for the Syracuse Police Department and flashbacks often take place in Syracuse.
- In episode six of VisionQuest, during a conversation with the Paladin, Vision brings up the former's family life, including their home address, 10 Old Pines Road, in Syracuse, New York.

== Literature ==
- Most Freddy the Pig books take place on farm a few miles outside of Syracuse.
- Speak by Laurie Halse Anderson is a novel set in Syracuse.
- I'll Take You There by Joyce Carol Oates is set at Syracuse University.
- Wayward by Dana Spiotta is set in and features the city of Syracuse.
