= Doreen Steidle =

Canadian diplomat

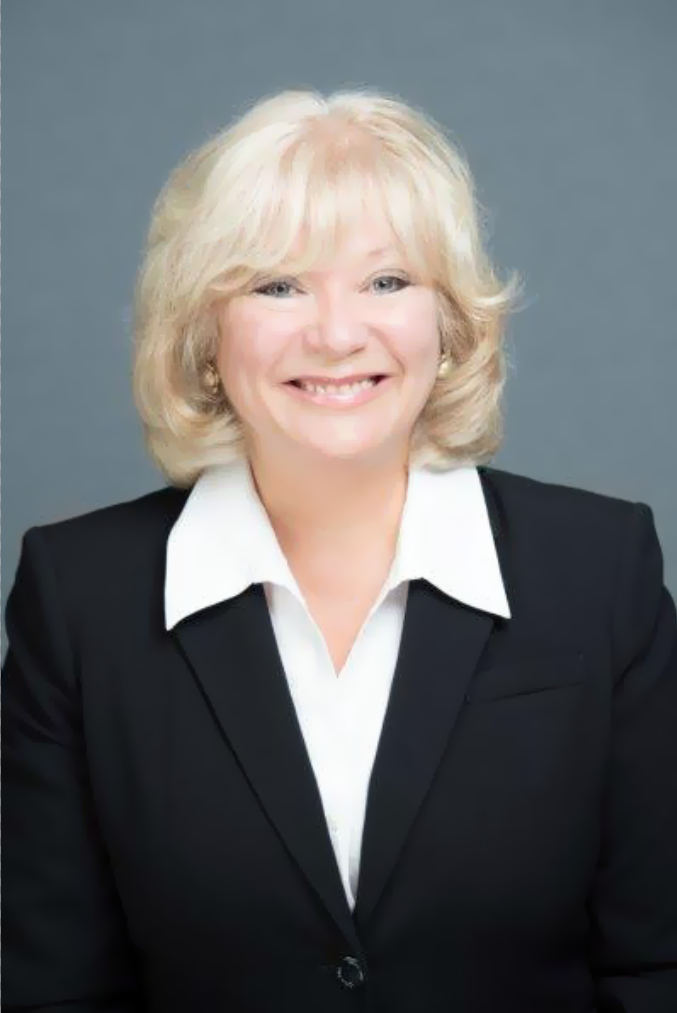
- Doreen Steidle (2015)

Doreen Steidle is a Harvard University Fellow, participating in the 2018 Advanced Leadership Initiative, former Regional Head for Group Government Affairs with HSBC in Hong Kong, China and former Canadian Head of Mission. She was Canada's High Commissioner to the Republic of Singapore (2000–2003) and Canada's Consul General to the Special Administrative Regions of Hong Kong and Macau, People's Republic of China (2008–2011). She was the first Chief Executive Officer of Passport Canada and an Assistant Deputy Minister in Canada's Department of Foreign Affairs and International Trade.

== Early life ==
Doreen Steidle was born in Winnipeg, Manitoba. She is a direct descendant of the German nobleman and adventurer Johann Robert von Capitain as well as Johann Georg Ritter von Steidle, the first Lord Mayor of Würzburg. After graduating from Kelvin High School in 1973, she attended the University of Manitoba followed by York University in Toronto where she graduated with a B.A. (Double Honours) in Political Science and History in 1977.

== Foreign Service Career ==
In July 1977 she joined the Department of Manpower and Immigration as a Foreign Service Officer. Between 1979 and 1995, she was posted to Sydney, Australia (as Vice-Consul), Washington D.C (Vice-Consul), Seoul, Republic of South Korea (First Secretary and Consul), Manila The Philippines (First Secretary and Consul) and Damascus, Syria (Counsellour). On her return to Ottawa in 1995, Steidle was appointed Director General of the Selection Branch at Citizenship and Immigration Canada, a position she held until 1997. From 1997 to 2000, she was Director General of Corporate Finance, Systems and Planning at the Department of Foreign Affairs and International Trade. In 2000, Steidle was appointed Canada's High Commissioner to the Republic of Singapore where she served for three years. In 2004, Steidle was appointed Director General of the Passport Office, a Special Operating Agency of the Department of Foreign Affairs which was renamed Passport Canada in 2005. Steidle was the first CEO of Passport Canada. In 2006, Steidle was appointed Assistant Deputy Minister (Corporate Services) at the Department of Foreign Affairs and International Trade. In 2008, Steidle was appointed Consul General to the Special Administrative Regions of Hong Kong and Macau, People's Republic of China.

== Awards and recognition ==
In addition to her receipt of two Merit Awards from the Department of Foreign Affairs and International Trade, in 2010 Steidle was awarded an Honorary Canadian Certified General Accountant designation from the CGA-Hong Kong. She was also named Consul General in Residence at Hong Kong Baptist University in 2010 and in 2013 was named by the Canadian Board Diversity Council as one of the "Diversity 50" group of Board-qualified women.

== After the Foreign Service ==
Upon her departure from Hong Kong in August 2011, Steidle left the Government of Canada and established her own consulting practice. She was appointed to the Boards of a number of organizations including Invest Ottawa, the Hong Kong Canada Business Association, the Retired Heads of Mission Association, and the Board of Governors of the Canadian Chamber of Commerce in Hong Kong.

In October 2012 and again in July 2019, Steidle was selected to be a Short-Term Observer on Canada's delegation to monitor the Ukrainian elections.

In 2015 Steidle returned to Hong Kong and served as the Regional Head for Group Government Affairs (Asia-Pacific) with HSBC continuing in this position until she assumed a one-year Fellowship (Advanced Leadership Initiative) at Harvard University in 2018.

Diplomatic posts
Preceded by G.K. Campbell	Consul General to Hong Kong and Macau; 2008–2011	Succeeded by Ian Burchett
Preceded by Barry Carin	High Commissioner to Singapore; 2000–2003	Succeeded by Alan Virtue
