= National Association of State Directors of Developmental Disabilities Services =

Washington, D.C. nonprofit organization

The National Association of State Directors of Developmental Disabilities Services (NASDDDS) is a nonprofit organization near Washington, D.C., established in 1964, to improve public services to people with intellectual and other developmental disabilities in the United States. Mary P. Sowers is the executive director.

== See also ==
- National Core Indicators
