= National Core Indicators =

National Core Indicators (NCI) is a collaborative effort between the National Association of State Directors of Developmental Disabilities Services (NASDDDS), ADvancing States and the Human Services Research Institute (HSRI) in the United States. The purpose of the program, which began in 1997, is to support state human services systems to gather a standard set of performance and outcome measures that can be used to track their own performance over time, to compare results across states, and to establish national benchmarks.

The primary aim of NCI is to collect and maintain valid and reliable data about the performance of public human service systems. NCI states and project partners use NCI data not only to improve practice at the state level but also to add knowledge to the field, to influence state and national policy, and to inform strategic planning initiatives.

Through participation in the program, NCI states make a commitment to share information with stakeholders so that data can be used for policy change and quality improvement. To that end, the National Core Indicators website provides public access to NCI data and current information about how the results are being used at the state and national levels to support policy, research, and advocacy efforts.

Today NCI is an umbrella terms that refer to a performance measurement system that tracks progress toward person-centered outcomes in the fields of intellectual and developmental disabilities, aging and disabilities, and more. NCI is composed of two initiatives: National Core Indicators-Intellectual and Developmental Disabilities (NCI-IDD) and National Core Indicators-Aging and Disabilities (NCI-AD).

== National Core Indicators-Intellectual and Developmental Disabilities (NCI-IDD) ==
The primary aim NCI-IDD is to hear directly from service users and to collect and maintain valid and reliable data about the performance of state public IDD systems and the outcomes experienced by participants in the system. NCI-IDD states and project partners work to generate data that can be used to improve long-term care policy and practice at the state and national level, and to contribute to knowledge in the IDD field.

From the beginning of NCI-IDD there has been a commitment to transparency and to making survey results public. This makes it possible to compare state results with national norms and to assess the strengths and weaknesses of the state IDD systems.

The NCI-IDD team and member/partner organizations have worked over more the two decades to go beyond just publishing the state and national results in order to assist public managers to identify trends, to develop tools to use the data for quality improvement, and to commit to ensuring that the data collection protocols reflect the most current issues and concerns in the IDD field. Tools have included the development of data briefs on specific areas of interest such as employment, dual diagnosis, self-directed services, and autism spectrum disorders. To inform the field, the results of analyses of the multi-state dataset have been published in academic research journals and presented at conferences.

=== The NCI-IDD Survey Portfolio ===
The NCI-IDD portfolio comprises an In Person Survey, three family surveys (The Adult Family Survey, The Family/Guardian Survey and The Children/Family Survey) and State of the Workforce Survey.

==== The In Person Survey ====
The In-Person Survey is completed with a minimum of 400 individuals (per participating state) who are 18 years of age or older and receiving at least one paid service in addition to case management. There are over 100 key outcome indicators in the survey that are designed to gather valid and reliable data across five broad domains: individual outcomes; family outcomes; health, welfare and rights; staff stability; and system performance. The survey has three components; background data, and two interview sections. The background data is most frequently completed by service coordinators prior to the face-to-face survey and includes information about general demographics; where people live, work, health information, etc. The interview part of the survey must be conducted face to face with the individual receiving services. The first section can only be answered by the individual. The second section of the survey may be completed by a proxy if the interviewer determines the individual cannot answer for him or herself or if the individual does not want to respond the NCI team provides training for interviewers who administer the survey. Completed surveys are entered using a secure online data entry system designed by HSRI.

==== The Family Surveys ====
===== The Adult Family Survey =====
The Adult Family Survey is completed by a minimum of 400 respondents (per participating state) who have an adult family member with I/DD living in the family home. This survey is mailed out to families to be completed. Returned survey information is entered into a secure on-line data entry system designed and managed by HSRI. States report response rates of between 35%- 40%.

===== The Family/Guardian Survey =====
The Family/Guardian Survey is completed with a minimum of 400 respondents (per participating state) who have an adult family member with I/DD living outside the family home. This survey is mailed out to families to be completed. Returned survey information is entered into a secure on-line data entry system designed and managed by HSRI. States report response rates of between 35%- 40%.

===== The Children/Family Survey =====
The Children/Family Survey is completed with a minimum of 400 respondents (per participating state) who have a child family member with I/DD living in the family home. This survey is mailed out to families to be completed. Returned survey information is entered into a secure on-line data entry system designed and managed by HSRI. States report response rates of between 35%- 40%.

===== The NCI-IDD State of the Workforce Survey =====
The State of the Workforce Survey is completed by all provider agencies (within participating states) supporting adults with I/DD in residential, employment, day services and other in-home or community inclusion programs. The survey is intended to capture information about the direct support professional (DSP) workforce such as turnover, vacancy rates, wages, types of services provided, and benefits offered. Each state provides HSRI with agency emails and the provider agencies respond directly into HSRI's on-line data entry system.

== National Core Indicators-Aging and Disabilities (NCI-AD) ==
The National Core Indicators-Aging and Disabilities (NCI-AD™) is an initiative designed to support states’ interest in assessing the performance of their programs and delivery systems in order to improve services for older adults and individuals with physical disabilities. NCI-AD’s primary aim is to collect and maintain valid and reliable data that give states a broad view of how publicly-funded services impact the quality of life and outcomes of service recipients.

NCI-AD brings an important value proposition to the field of aging and disability services through development of indicators and outcomes that assess quality of life, community integration, and person-centered services. The project program helps address long-recognized gaps in assessing outcomes in long term services and supports (LTSS) service systems that go beyond measures of health and safety to address important social, community, and person-centered goals as well as quality of life.

Data for the project are gathered through annual in-person surveys and a provider survey administered in each participating state, every state does not participate in each survey every year. NCI-AD Project Team interprets each state's data and produces reports that can support state efforts to strengthen LTSS policy, inform quality improvement activities, and compare their performance with national norms.

=== The NCI-AD Survey Portfolio ===
The NCI-AD portfolio comprises an Adult Consumer Survey and State of the Workforce Survey.

=== The Adult Consumer Survey ===
The Adult Consumer Survey (ACS) is completed with a minimum of 400 individuals (per participating state) who are 18 years of age or older and receiving at least one paid service in addition to case management. The indicators that make up the ACS go beyond simple measures of health and safety; they also address important personal outcomes such as community engagement, independence, decision-making, self-direction and other person-centered components of a quality life. And the data fill a crucial gap in performance measurement systems in aging and disability: information about the experience of people receiving services directly from those people themselves. The survey has two components; background data, and an interview section. The background data includes information about general demographics; where people live, work, health information, etc. The interview part of the survey must be conducted face to face with the individual receiving services. Parts of the survey may be completed by a proxy if the interviewer determines the individual cannot answer for him or herself or if the individual does not want to respond. The NCI team provides training for interviewers who administer the survey. Completed surveys are entered using a secure online data entry system designed by HSRI.

==== The NCI-AD State of the Workforce Survey ====
The State of the Workforce Survey is completed by all provider agencies (within participating states) supporting the Aging and Disability population in residential, day services and other in-home or community inclusion programs. The survey is intended to capture information about the direct support worker (DSW) workforce such as turnover, vacancy rates, wages, types of services provided, and benefits offered. Each state provides HSRI with agency emails and the provider agencies respond directly into HSRI's on-line data entry system.

== NCI Reports and publications ==
Data from NCI surveys are aggregated and analyzed in reports produced yearly. These data are used to support state efforts to strengthen long-term care policy, inform the conduct of quality assurance activities, and compare performance with national norms. Additionally, NCI data have been used as the basis of data briefs on specific areas of interest such as employment, dual diagnosis, self-directed services, and autism spectrum disorders, and the results of analyses of the multi-state dataset have been published in academic research journals and presented at conferences. NCI has also been cited as a "Resource on Autism" by NBC News. NCI indicators contribute to the calculation of state rankings in United Cerebral Palsy's report The Case for Inclusion.

Data from the National Core Indicators surveys also provide a rich source of data on demographics, personal characteristics, work status, and services received. These data, together with NCI data on outcomes, have been used in many peer-reviewed research articles and presentations. NCI data is available to researchers through a data request process.
