= Astronaut family =

Term for family distributed around the world

An astronaut family is a family unit where the members reside in different countries across the world—in contrast to a nuclear family. The astronaut family represents the growing transnationalism of peoples' identities that accompanies the growing globalization.

The term was coined by Aihwa Ong in her publication Flexible Citizenship: The cultural logics of transnationality in 1999. The term is especially used to describe Chinese families, who have spread across the globe.

== Description ==
Astronaut families was a new economic source started in the early 80s for Chinese to migrate abroad and work under contracts or settle down and then send money and earnings back home to support family left in the home land. Hong Kong and Taiwan were the first centered astronaut families. Leading destinations to migrate to include Australia, Canada, New Zealand, and the US. The unique characteristic of astronaut families is the distribution of multiple family members to other countries maintaining the links of all back in their original land. The head of the family (father), usually travels to secure family interests. Women stay in the home country to care for children, but in the case that they go to work, grandparents take the role for caring for children. One main reason for the astronaut family is to promote foreign business and open international markets in key economic areas. The term Taai Hung Yahn (Chinese: 太空人; Cantonese Yale: taai hùng yàhn) defines the families that sent a member abroad while they worked and had businesses at home in Hong Kong. Three ironic meanings are "taai hung" as outer space, the whole phrase associated as the idea of a person located among different places, and the expression can also be a play on words meaning "man without a wife". Semantic play refers to astronaut as a man and in these families men often do leave, while women stay as housewives in the host country. During the 1980s and 1990s, a substantial migration of Chinese families from Hong Kong and Taiwan brought a visible influx of wealth to Canada.

== Impact on family ==
Transnational living arrangements may impact children negatively or positively depending on characteristics of both the child and parent. It is possible that a child may benefit economically if the migrated parent is sending financial resources over. However, the child may be impacted negatively due to being separated from his or her parents for a prolonged amount of time. Children often do better emotionally when their father migrates than when their mother migrates.

In certain transnational families, such as the Vietnamese transnational family, role shifts sometimes occur if a mother migrates, rather than the father. Men sometimes experience shifts in household labor division, resulting in men doing more care work.

== See also ==
- Complex family
- Familialism
- Family relationships
- Hajnal line
- Hindu joint family
- Human bonding
- Intentional community
- Kibbutzim and families
- Origins of society
- Sociology of the family
- Structural functionalism
