= Nursing home care in the United States =

As of 2017, approximately 1.4 million Americans live in a nursing home, two-thirds of whom rely on Medicaid to pay for their care. Residential nursing facilities receive Medicaid federal funding and approvals through a state health department. These facilities may be overseen by various types of state agency (e.g. health, mental health, or intellectual disabilities).

Nursing homes have traditionally been large institutions. Smaller community versions were developed around the 1970s. Some "community living" (CL) groups advocated for a different type of care and funding, which resulted in the creation of assisted living facilities.

Efforts to promote community-based Long Term Services and Supports (LTSS) are led by groups such as the Consortium of Citizens with Disabilities which represents over 200 national disability organizations.

== History ==
In the United States, the national social insurance program Medicare, was established by the U.S. federal government in 1965, which guaranteed access to health insurance for Americans aged 65 and older. This program prompted many new nursing homes to be set up in the following years, although private nursing homes were already being built from the 1930s as a consequence of the Great Depression and the Social Security Act of 1935. Medicaid, the Nation's poverty program, often funds programs such as nursing beds as residents may be "impoverished" to access the facility.

In 1987, a report examined the nursing home problem in Wisconsin which involved 4,000 people, 80% under 65 years of age with an average of 110 patients per facility. 5% had developmental disabilities. They reported that 13 large institutions were certified as SNFs (skilled nursing facilities), that all were "absolutely inappropriate" placements for the developmental disabilities' clients (the federal GAO then reported a need to upgrade services in the homes, including day services), and the facilities resembled institutions of other types such as Willowbrook where abuses had been uncovered.

=== Nursing home reform ===
Nursing homes have been the subject of decades of efforts by states and at the national levels to reform health and residential care for "frail" elders, especially those with lower incomes in the US. Regulations have been added to assure that basic good care (i.e., humane, accepted good human standards) will take place in these facilities (e.g., personnel, education, activities and services, ancillary and professional services, advocacy and reviews).

In 1980 the Civil Rights of Institutionalized Persons Act was passed to protect the civil rights of, amongst others, residents of nursing homes and similar facilities.

A 1986 study organized by the Institute of Medicine found that people in nursing homes were not getting fair or adequate health care or personal treatment. The Institute of Medicine responded to the study by proposing broad and deep reforms in the regulation of nursing homes. These reforms were integrated into the Omnibus Budget Reconciliation Act of 1987 and passed as part of that law. Specifically, the Federal Nursing Home Reform Act is a part of the Omnibus Budget Reconciliation Act of 1987 which gives guidelines to regulate nursing home care in the United States. The act was intended to advance nursing home residents' rights. The Nursing Home Reform Act provides guidelines and minimal standards which nursing homes must meet. It also created a Nursing Home Residents' Bill of Rights.

A major nursing home reform initiative occurred in 1996 when the Health Care Financing Administration studied its own facilities and reported to the US Congress on the effectiveness of its current system and certification of nursing homes. By 1998, the President announced new steps for federal oversight including monitoring of poor performance, collection of new fees, and increased focus on nutrition and basic personal care like pressure sores. By 2000, minimum staffing ratios and implementation of Nursing Home Quality of Care were introduced. These actions followed the Omnibus Budget Reconciliation Act of 1987.

The Centers for Medicare and Medicaid Services in the Department of Health and Human Services now publish the "Nursing Home Data Compendium" annually, which show various statistics related to nursing homes and residents, as well as health deficiencies and substandard care. The results of the 2015 edition were generally positive, showing a decrease of substandard care reports from 4.4% in 2008 to 3.2% in 2014, reversing a previously increasing trend.

In Health and Hospital Corporation of Marion County v. Talevski, 599 U.S. 166 (2023), the United States Supreme Court held that the provisions of the Federal Nursing Home Reform Act (FNHRA) at issue unambiguously created rights enforceable under Section 1983 of the Ku Klux Klan Act (codified at 42 U.S.C. § 1983), and private enforcement under §1983 is compatible with the FNHRA's remedial scheme. The Supreme Court ruled that a plaintiff can file a federal civil rights claim because of violation of the Federal Nursing Home Reform Act.

=== Intermediate care facilities ===
Intermediate care facilities (small) were developed by the state categorical systems (intellectual disabilities, mental health) in the 1970s, as a reaction to exposes on institutional conditions resulting in required active treatment in institutions and the new building of community facilities recommended under 16 in size. These facilities, which resembled homes in their smaller sizes (e.g., 4–6) are operated by community services management (sometimes civil servants) and are separately regulated. All need a state health department approval for federal Medicaid and Medicare.

Nurses may be hired as a staff supplement, as may be therapists (e.g., speech, occupational therapists), adult day who may be civil servants or BA/AA human services personnel, or clinic services (e.g., psychologist, audiologist). Conversion of group homes or community residences into intermediate care facilities was of great concern due to its "overly medical" nature and requirements not meeting the community needs of the population group.

== Regulations ==
In the U.S. Centers for Medicare and Medicaid Services ensures that every Medicare and Medicaid beneficiary receives health care, both within health care settings such as nursing homes, and among health care settings during care transitions. The states in the US have health departments also responsible for oversight of the facilities and regulation.

Home and community services are new developments in the 1970s in the US for long-term services and supports (LTSS) populations and parallels the move to ambulatory versus facility care which was a US hospital and institutional (e.g., nursing facilities) to community transition. LTSS services have diverse oversight and regulations, and these vary by facility type, by population group, and by financing as well as traditional regulatory agencies. The LTSS movement was involved with increasing autonomy and control of services which was recommended in professional texts, national forums, research studies and state directives in the 1980s and 1990s.

To ensure that nursing homes meet the necessary legal standards, the authorities conduct inspections of all nursing home facilities; as often as quarterly. Surveyors conduct on-site surveys of certified nursing homes on average every 12 months to assure basic levels of quality and safety for beneficiaries. The authority might also undertakes various initiatives to improve the effectiveness of the annual nursing home surveys, as well as to improve the investigations prompted by complaints from consumers or family members about nursing homes.

== Alternative care models ==
Other fields have introduced new community care models into fields dominated by the hospital and nursing care industries, such as assisted living facilities, Program of All-Inclusive Care for the Elderly (PACE) from the 1990s, or service-enriched housing from the 1970s. In recent years, there has been a general movement toward implementing alternative care models. Some have tried to create a more resident-centered environment, so that they should become more "home-like" and less institutional or "hospital-like". In these homes, units are replaced with a small set of rooms surrounding a common kitchen and living room. The staff giving care is assigned to one of these "households". The reason, in part, is because the population is aging, and over half of the people in nursing homes are over age 85.

Residents have more choices about when they wake, when they eat, and their schedule for the day. They also have access to pets. The facilities utilizing these models may refer to such changes as the "Culture Shift" or "Culture Change" occurring in the Long Term Care, or LTC, industry which includes the LTSS industry termed Long term Services and Supports in the Community. Sometimes this kind of facility is called a "greenhouse". Most residential care models are considered to be community services operated by community agencies rather than nursing facilities; an example of different kinds of "community-based care" are "Alzheimer's demonstrations" which originally included: mobile day care, rural geriatric dementia evaluation, El Portal services for Latinos, Client Advocates, and AL-Care services for clients who live alone (Starns, Karner and Montgomer, 2002).

== Facilities ==
=== Long term care ===
Originally loosely regulated, convalescent or rest homes may include foster group living, room and board facilities, and group care which may often be private, for-profit based on Social Security and Social Security Disability Insurance.

==== Facility personnel ====
Long-term care personnel (LTC) who work in facilities are now considered part of the new workforce funded through the federal government and its Medicaid and Medicare programs which are undergoing change in conjunction with the Patient Protection and Affordable Care Act of 2010. The Institute on Community Integration at the University of Minnesota with the Lewin Group, has been providing online education for the Direct Support Professional who also work in facility-based programs not just in the new community long term services and supports (LTSS).

===== Intermediate care facility personnel =====
Many intermediate care facility personnel may be civil servants in states who have been part of the deinstitutionalization movement in the US. Otherwise, these are government contracted facilities from categorical departments (e.g., intellectual and developmental disabilities) who require education in their targeted population group, often function under a primary generic personnel model, and have high clinical related groups and programs (e.g., psychologists, social workers, nurses and nutritionists). Small intermediate care facilities, together with group homes, were supported by the non-profit sector in the US, while the large facilities over 16 have not been approved for the most part (e.g., "residual institutional populations").

As an example of the federal and state financing involved, the state of Louisiana in 1988 was at $22,399,971 federal funds for intellectual and developmental disabilities with $20,788,749 allocated for small intermediate care facilities, primarily operated by the private sector. The large institutional facilities at the time in the state also received federal intermediate care facilities (ICFs) funds totalling $63,462,458 with the private sector operating $18,453,062 "federal funds" for "not recommended" large ICF-MRs (over 16 in size). In FY 2011, in Louisiana, federal intermediate care facility financing was at $341.4 million with home- and community-based services at $413.0 million.

===== Administration =====
Administration of intermediate care facilities are the state offices of mental health or people with developmental disabilities through direct regional provision or local contracts, non-profit or profit. Administration of nursing homes are the state to local department of health direct to local contracts, generally for-profit.

Depending on size, staff may include those responsible for individual departments (i.e., accounting, human resources, etc.). Nursing home administrators are required to be licensed to run nursing facilities.

=== Assisted living facilities ===
Assisted living residences or assisted living facilities (ALFs) are housing facilities primarily for elders and may also have services for people with disabilities. These facilities provide supervision or assistance with activities of daily living (ADLs); ALFs are an eldercare alternative on the continuum of care for people, for whom independent living is not appropriate but who do not need the 24-hour medical care provided by a nursing home. Keren Brown Wilson first developed the idea for assisted living during the 1980s as an alternative to nursing home care. Assisted living is a philosophy of care and services promoting independence and dignity which was promoted nationwide as a community support in the 1990s, not a new nursing facility movement. In the original conception of assisted living, Wilson sought to provide similar services to that of a nursing home, but still grant the resident more autonomy. In other words, medical personnel were on-site and available to residents, but residents were still free to dictate their schedules.

For example, they could eat what they wanted, and sleep when they wanted to. Wilson's idea was to emphasize maintaining a consistent, satisfying quality of life for the resident. Wilson's idea was first tested as an experiment in Oregon, after which the idea spread, leading to more and more assisted living facilities across the nation during the 1990s. As other corporations developed more and more assisted living communities, the concept began to increasingly mimic nursing homes as opposed to the original assisted living model proposed by Wilson.

Thus, while assisted living facilities may now offer a menu of different services, they often remain tied to nursing facilities, policies and practices which were the original source of national concern. In addition, these facilities were funded often instead of in-home services and supports for individuals and families in local communities which has been requested nationwide for over three decades. Similar to nursing homes, assisted living communities are typically home to senior citizens and individuals with dementia. These communities require certification by the state.

=== Skilled nursing facilities ===
A skilled nursing facility (SNF) is a nursing home certified to participate in, and be reimbursed by Medicare. Medicare is the federal program primarily for the aged (65+) who contributed to Social Security and Medicare while they were employed. Medicaid is the federal program implemented with each state to provide health care and related services to those who are below the poverty line. Each state defines poverty and, therefore, Medicaid eligibility.

Those eligible for Medicaid may be low-income parents, children, including State Children's Health Insurance Programs (SCHIPs) and maternal-child wellness and food programs. seniors, and people with disabilities. However, Medicaid for individuals living at home, and for facilities as providers are two separate financing mechanisms (e.g., may have facility state supplements; facility payments for personnel, administration, and services) which are not separated for public review on their use.

Over 90% of SNF Medicare Part A payments are driven by physical therapy (rehabilitation); SNFs are determined less by non-therapy components like caretaking, e.g., laundry, personal care at bed and bathing, meal assistance, housekeeping.

The vast majority (90%) of SNFs are freestanding and a few are hospital based (defined as distinct part (D/P) of an institution). Old style nursing homes (e.g., run by counties, and now being sold to for-profit enterprises) continue to receive federal funds.

=== Home health care ===
"Alternatives to facility care" of the 1970s included recommendations for home health and other community services. Home health typically refers to a nursing visit or aide visit to assist with daily living and are provided by certified home health care agencies. Barr (2007) reported Medicaid funds at $47.8 billion nationally in 2008, and Medicare, a different federal program at $20 billion in 2010. In the late 2000s, the annual cap on services was finally removed, and hospital care first was no longer a stated criterion.

Young adults and many elders would prefer to obtain services at home. Those providing services are nurse's aides, personal assistance services, home health caregivers or home caregivers, "support aides", peer companions, and social day care in senior centers. They are somewhat reimbursed in insurance policies. Clients wish to retain their personal physician, and may wish to obtain therapies through private offices such as mental health counselors, chiropractors, home care agencies, medication management counselors, physical therapists, county aging workers, and rehabilitation counselors. Government may also offer directly or indirectly other services such as emergency assistance lines, social work visits, meals on wheels, respite or senior companions, transportation, appointments, money management, or in some instances, adult day programs, among others.

However, in some areas these services are available for a limited number of hours each week, and are therefore considered to be "underdeveloped community systems" for elders. Independent living (IL) services have made inroads in community services to support young adults with physical and medical needs to live in their own homes and apartments, including under the new self-directed care of Medicaid and Medicare.

In 2012 the American Association of Retired Persons, in its profiles on long term services and supports in the states, indicated that $5,495 per person is available for home health services, $11,142 for personal care services, $10,710 for aging waiver. The average for nursing facilities is $29,533 per person. In part, this development may be traced to the arguments for "cost-effectiveness" and "cost benefits" made to shift institutional to community care.

=== Intermediate care facilities ===
An intermediate care facility (ICF) is a health care facility for individuals who are disabled, elderly, or non-acutely ill, usually providing less intensive care than that offered at a hospital or skilled nursing facility. Typically an ICF is not privately paid by the individual or by the individual's family, but involves federal Medicaid financing with a state and federal share, and individual contribution. An individual's private health insurance and/or a third party service like a hospice company may cover part of the cost. ICFs in the community have been increasingly replaced financially by Home and community-based waiver services. (In FY 2011, only 8% ICFs compared to 65% HCBS waiver of $48.29 billion community spending in intellectual and developmental disabilities nationally).

For comparisons between intermediate care facilities large and small in intellectual disabilities, see Home and community-based services: Costs, utilization and outcomes in the state of Minnesota (Lakin et al., 2005). The primary problem with these facilities today are their exorbitant cost (reported as average of $123,053 per person, likely institutions)compared to home and community-based Medicaid waiver services ($42,896 per person) which also far exceed the cost of nursing facilities (American Association of Retired Persons, 2012, p. 14).

==== Involuntary care as an administrative decision ====
Generally, involuntary care is involved in intermediate care facilities (ICFs) where a service demand has existed, and waiting lists occur for services for decades. Often these waiting lists will be for community services of other kinds including home and community-based Medicaid waiver services. These kinds of services have been involved with multiple lawsuits regarding equitable distribution, and are now subject to the US Supreme Court's Olmstead Decision on the "most integrated setting".

Regarding "nursing homes", hospitals may require placement for discharge, and decides also if the patient can stay in the hospital. This is called hospital administration. The hospital may call the ambulance, and may not inform relatives of the location of the patient. Once a patient has "been moved" (transported by ambulance) into the nursing home on the hospital's approved list, the nursing home claims all rights to decision making regarding the person' care, including relative contact.

By 2008, however, nursing home emancipation with elders back to homes in communities was undertaken with an extremely high success rate when conducted with independent living personnel. Home health and long-term services and supports availability at the same extent as a facility nursing home has been "recommended" by community planners, professionals and academics since the 1970s, and aging personnel nationwide have been educated to that effect. Currently, a new effort to train personal care attendants and develop national standards is in place.

==== Staff ====
Intermediate care facility (ICF) staffing are direct service personnel and managerial personnel responsible for professional staff (including nurses and therapists), and for in house and community programming from transportation to grocery shopping, recreational activities, personal care and mobility, communication and home activities, and so forth. Almost all direct service staff are considered Direct Support Professionals.

=== Board and care homes ===
Board and care homes (residential care homes) are special facilities designed to provide those who require assisted living services both living quarters and proper care. These facilities can either be located in a small residential home or a large facility. A large majority of board and care homes are designed to room less than 6 people. Board and care homes are typically staffed by licensed professionals, including nurses, doctors and other medical professionals. These facilities are regulated. Board and care homes offer residents 24 hour assistance.

== Financials ==
Cost may vary by geographical location. Medicare, Medicaid, and insurance plans often pay for nursing home care; personal assets are also used. Personal needs may dictate which nursing home is most cost-effective for any given person.

=== Medicare and Medicaid ===
Medicare is a federal program that provides health insurance for Americans 65 or older. Medicare covers only 100 days of care and so it is a popular choice for rehabilitation facilities. The next potential option for many is Medicaid, a program administered by every state administers and certifies most nursing homes, but each state may have different eligibility requirements related to income levels and any assets involved. Medicaid is normally most available after a person has exercise every other option such as using personal funds as a form of payment may cover therapy, room and board or meal plans.

The Centers for Medicare and Medicaid Services is the component of the U.S. Department of Health and Human Services (DHHS) that oversees Medicare and Medicaid. A large portion of Medicare and Medicaid funding is used each year to cover nursing home care and services for the elderly and disabled. State governments oversee the licensing of nursing homes. In addition, states have a contract with CMS to monitor those nursing homes that want to be eligible to provide care to Medicare and Medicaid beneficiaries. Congress established minimum requirements for nursing homes that want to provide services under Medicare and Medicaid. The requirements are broadly outlined in the Social Security Act, which also entrusts the Secretary of Health and Human Services with the responsibility of monitoring and enforcing these requirements. CMS is also charged with the responsibility of working out the details of the law and how it will be implemented, which it does by writing regulations and manuals.

=== Long-term insurance ===
Long-term care insurance is another potential option to help pay for nursing home care. Long-term care insurance was designed to help with the expensive out-of-pocket costs. It is recommended that one purchases long-term care insurance before they need it, which may require paying premiums for years prior. Depending on the policy, there are different ways that the insurance can be used in order to help with costs such as taking out a portion of the death benefits or choosing a life settlement.

=== Personal funds ===
Many will start off paying for nursing home care with personal funds. These funds may include personal savings, assets or stocks. Many families will pool funds until a family member can become eligible for a public benefit program. Other common ways to help pay are reverse mortgages. Reverse mortgages involves a homeowner exchanging the equity they have acquired for cash which can then be accessed as a monthly payment or line of credit. This step is often viewed as more drastic which is why it is important to speak with the nursing facility first to see what type of services and care are included in the overall price.

Monthly Cost of Nursing Homes by State:

State	Semi Private Room (Double Occupancy, Rate per Person)			Private Room		
State	Min Cost	Median	Max Cost	Min Cost	Median	Max Cost
Alabama	$3,954	$5,810	$8,790	$4,258	$6,356	$12,045
Alaska	$14,022	$23,451	$38,173	$14,022	$23,451	$38,173
Arizona	$3,954	$5,840	$16,729	$4,988	$7,087	$19,771
Arkansas	$3,437	$4,715	$13,231	$3,954	$5,488	$26,310
California	$2,829	$7,450	$27,770	$4,380	$8,669	$27,770
Colorado	$5,262	$6,996	$19,771	$5,445	$7,794	$19,771
Connecticut	$5,931	$12,167	$14,600	$6,540	$13,231	$15,360
Delaware	$6,844	$9,125	$9,916	$7,057	$9,825	$10,646
Florida	$5,171	$7,300	$14,448	$5,475	$8,060	$15,360
Georgia	$3,498	$5,566	$7,756	$3,650	$5,931	$20,653
Hawaii	$8,000	$10,403	$17,094	$8,000	$11,254	$18,737
Idaho	$5,049	$6,935	$8,821	$5,353	$7,376	$11,224
Illinois	$3,407	$5,399	$31,481	$3,954	$6,205	$31,481
Indiana	$3,042	$6,540	$10,311	$4,563	$7,604	$13,688
Iowa	$3,498	$5,323	$8,213	$4,502	$5,688	$9,064
Kansas	$4,106	$5,019	$7,330	$4,410	$5,475	$8,760
Kentucky	$5,110	$6,327	$24,029	$5,323	$7,270	$24,485
Louisiana	$3,528	$4,715	$12,167	$3,407	$5,171	$15,208
Maine	$5,749	$8,365	$12,440	$6,540	$8,973	$13,475
Maryland	$5,749	$8,448	$11,193	$6,083	$9,186	$14,113
Massachusetts	$6,844	$10,737	$15,969	$6,844	$11,632	$14,874
Michigan	$5,688	$7,559	$11,041	$5,992	$8,258	$14,113
Minnesota	$3,255	$7,034	$11,558	$5,080	$8,002	$12,897
Mississippi	$5,019	$6,235	$7,878	$5,384	$6,692	$9,125
Missouri	$3,468	$4,639	$7,908	$3,954	$5,064	$11,558
Montana	$5,171	$6,388	$8,730	$5,323	$6,692	$8,730
Nebraska	$3,437	$5,982	$8,304	$4,045	$6,631	$18,250
Nevada	$3,346	$7,178	$8,425	$4,106	$8,213	$15,452
New Hampshire	$7,756	$9,612	$14,752	$8,365	$10,190	$15,634
New Jersey	$7,026	$9,733	$12,958	$7,574	$10,646	$13,657
New Mexico	$4,867	$6,220	$12,167	$5,323	$7,118	$14,387
New York	$6,083	$10,980	$32,850	$6,874	$11,370	$32,850
North Carolina	$3,103	$6,266	$9,612	$3,285	$6,844	$19,163
North Dakota	$4,715	$8,365	$12,380	$5,140	$8,745	$12,380
Ohio	$2,859	$6,388	$13,535	$3,589	$7,148	$14,144
Oklahoma	$3,346	$4,441	$5,323	$4,106	$5,019	$10,342
Oregon	$5,323	$7,992	$9,034	$5,627	$8,502	$10,494
Pennsylvania	$2,950	$8,790	$29,565	$4,715	$9,429	$30,873
Rhode Island	$5,080	$7,756	$10,281	$5,779	$8,593	$10,828
South Carolina	$2,920	$5,779	$10,068	$3,711	$6,251	$10,615
South Dakota	$5,049	$6,064	$7,574	$5,353	$6,448	$7,817
Tennessee	$4,563	$5,840	$7,848	$4,623	$6,296	$12,532
Texas	$2,738	$4,258	$7,908	$3,072	$5,718	$11,893
Utah	$4,106	$5,323	$9,125	$4,471	$6,388	$15,208
Vermont	$7,908	$8,502	$11,011	$7,908	$8,760	$15,208
Virginia	$5,019	$6,707	$23,117	$5,323	$7,724	$23,269
Washington	$5,414	$8,078	$15,969	$5,810	$8,803	$15,969
Washington D.C.	$8,213	$8,213	$8,213	$8,213	$8,213	$8,213
West Virginia	$5,962	$8,562	$10,798	$6,388	$8,969	$11,102
Wisconsin	$5,323	$7,505	$24,790	$5,627	$8,292	$25,428
Wyoming	$5,293	$6,692	$9,125	$5,779	$7,437	$9,125

== Personnel ==
=== Direct staff ===
In most jurisdictions, nursing homes are required to provide enough staff to adequately care for residents. For example, a state may require that a nursing home has at least one registered nurse available for at least 8 straight hours a day throughout the week, and at least a licensed practical nurse on duty 24 hours per day for up to 100 residents. Understaffed facilities are one common causes of nursing home neglect due to the staff's inability to meet the needs of all residents.

The federal government considers categories of direct service personnel to include staff and aides, and licensed and unlicensed personnel, to have similar needs and functions (See, classifications of mental health professionals for comparisons which are also available for hiring in facilities). The direct care staff have direct, daily contact with the patient in activities such as meals, personal care, daily activity (e.g., bingo), medications, and travel (often in wheelchairs) in the units. In a nursing home, the personnel may include registered nurses, licensed practical nurses and nursing assistants.

=== Indirect staff ===
Custodians, maintenance staff, and groundskeepers keep the inside and outside of the building in clean, working order, though direct staff are responsible for areas of personal cleanliness.

Additional support personnel also include people who may have some contact with the patient in the nursing home. For example, nursing homes may have an activities director who is responsible for planning social activities, coordinating special visitors and religious services. Larger facilities may have multiple staff members, such as chaplains or activity assistants, who take on some of those roles. The government requires a minimal activity schedule for residents in order to obtain funds.

=== Ombudsmen ===
In the US, some states and organizations provide an ombudsman who can provide assistance with concerns about long-term care facilities. Ombudsmen work to resolve problems and concerns involving long-term care providers, residents and their families, and other involved parties, and to improve residents' quality of life.

=== Outsourced services ===
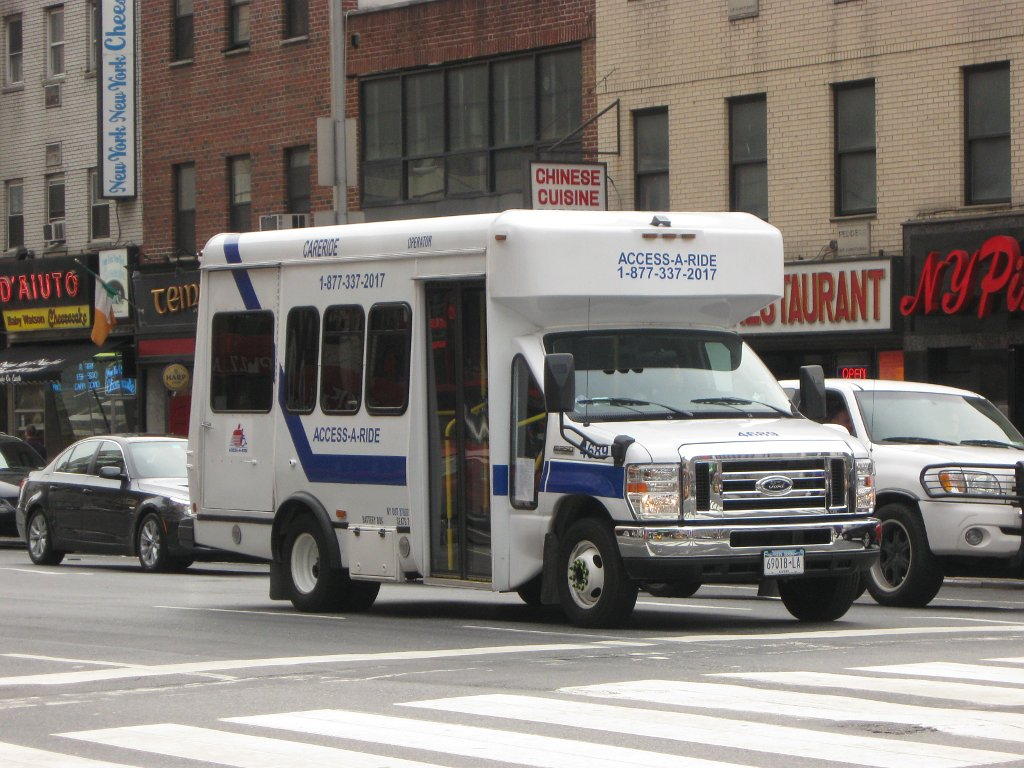
A NYC Transit paratransit bus.

At certain facilities, residents who are mobile are able to ride paratransit vehicles to visit places outside of the facility. However, the cost is not always covered by the facility.

== Services ==
Nursing facilities offer (by county planning process) the most extensive care a person can get outside a hospital, if one discounts regional medical centers, alternative programs in the community (sometimes now, medical homes, and 24 hour care programs), and the newer assisted living facilities. Nursing homes offer help with custodial care—like bathing, getting dressed, and eating—as well as skilled care given by a registered nurse and includes medical monitoring and treatments.

Skilled care also includes services provided by specially trained professionals, such as physical, occupational, and respiratory therapists.

The services nursing homes offer vary from facility to facility. Services can include:

- Room and board
- Monitoring of medication
- Personal care (including dressing, bathing, and toilet assistance)
- 24-hour emergency care
- Social and recreational activities (posted schedules)
- Religious assistance (Chapel)

=== Occupational therapy ===
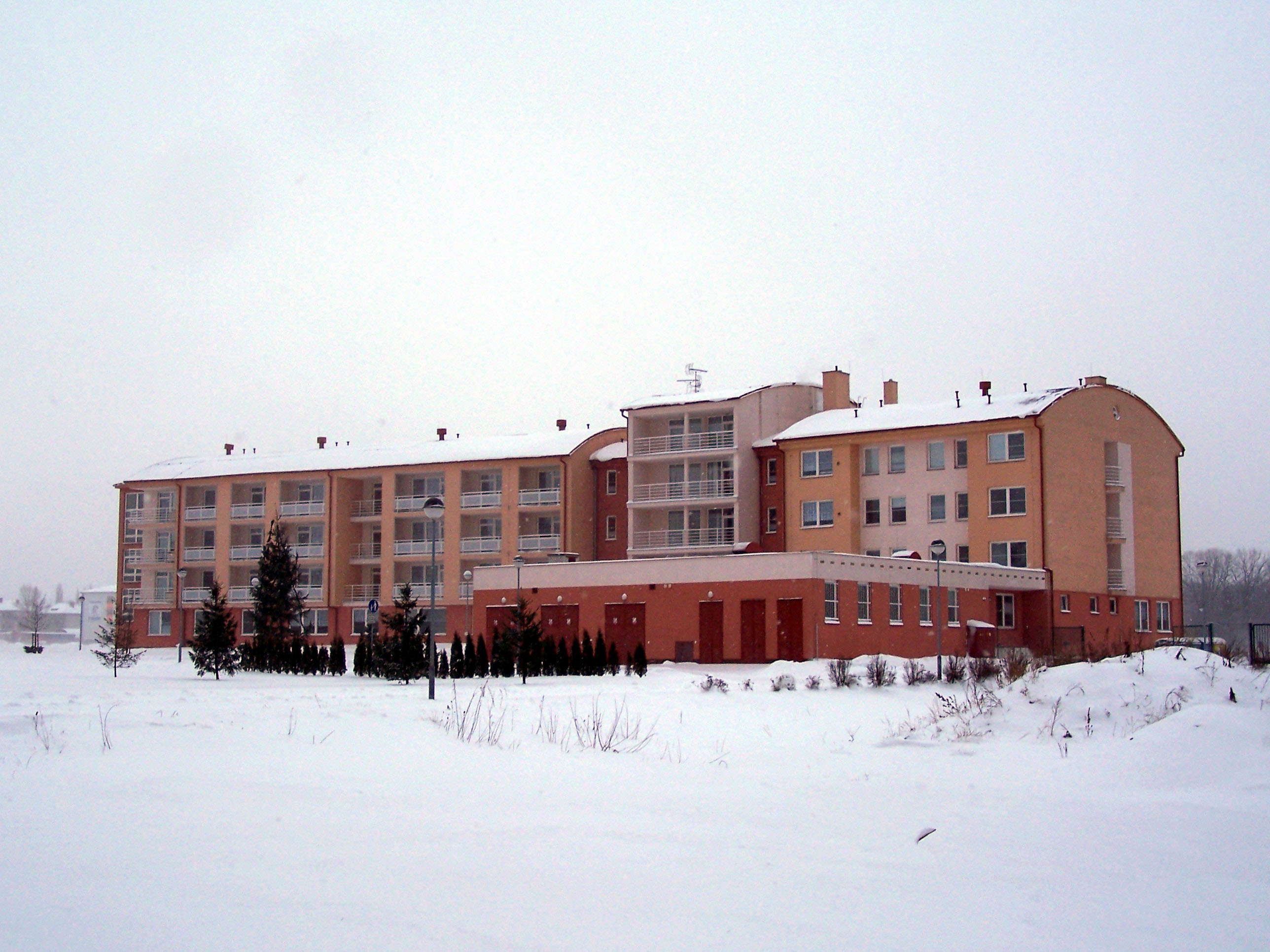
Rest home for seniors in Český Těšín, Czech Republic

Some individuals that are housed in a nursing home require ongoing occupational therapy. Occupational therapists "promote the health and participation of people, organizations, and populations through engagement in occupation". These specialists provide intervention in areas of occupation such as: activities of daily living (such as bathing, dressing, grooming; instrumental activities of daily living (home and financial management, rest and sleep, education, work, play, leisure) and social participation. In certain facilities, part-time employment in areas such as a facility mailroom are utilized by residents who prefer to stay busy and to improve dexterity.

They also develop and implement health and wellness programs to prevent injuries, maintain function, and improve safety of residents. For example, Occupational Therapists can take a leadership role in developing and implementing programs to educate clients on compensatory techniques for low vision, customized exercise programs, or strategies to prevent falls. Occupational therapy practitioners may also consult with other staff within the facility or in the community on a variety of topics related to increasing safe engagement in activities.

Occupational therapy practitioners can provide a variety of services to short- and long-term residents of a SNF. Based on a client-centered evaluation, the occupational therapist, the client, caregivers, and/or significant others develop collaborative goals to identify strengths and deficits and address barriers that hinder occupational performance in multiple areas. The intervention plan is designed to promote a client's optimal function for transition to home, another facility, or long-term care.

=== Physical therapy ===
Some of the individuals that are housed in a nursing home need ongoing physical therapy. This can be for any number of reasons. Perhaps a person has motor skills that never fully developed or have stopped functioning for some reason. Perhaps an individual has undergone a surgery or medical procedure that requires some manner of physical restitution on a personal level. Nursing homes offer specialists that are well versed in the field of rebuilding muscle or helping one regain their confidence when it comes to doing something physical. This is one of the most common therapies that are done in these nursing homes.

=== Medical needs ===
Nearly all residents in a nursing home have some type of medical need, ranging from basic care requirements to more specialized needs. Most nursing facilities are equipped to deal with most general medical needs likely to emerge. Most of the staff will have ample training in how to deal with patients with specific needs. In fact, the staff that interact daily with the patients are normally registered nurses, who have spent years training for all contingent situations that they may encounter in a nursing home.

However, children and adults with medical and physical needs have been supported in families and community settings for decades, including through the early Katie Beckett waivers, serving children with technological needs. Personal assistance services in workplaces also may be Medicaid -funded and support individuals to live in the community, often throughout their adulthood. These are called community services, not necessarily nursing services.

== Residential versus institutionalized care ==
In the US there are over 43 categories of residential care of the institutional variety in the US, including the modernized "assisted living facility" of the late 1990s. These categories generally reflect the target of institutional reform to better quality supports in homes and communities.

In various states, Medicaid Waiver programs have been developed to allow impoverished elders access to home-based care, instead of being forced into an institution.

Though begun in New York in the 1970s, the legislative program was reported nationally together with other early community program development such as family support which grew to 950 programs serving younger adults and their families in New York alone. In addition, in fields such as intellectual and developmental disabilities, [family support], small homes (no larger than 12, 2–4), small intermediate care facilities (ICF-DDs) and community supports (e.g., supported employment) were developed as new, integrated service systems.

== See also ==
- Supportive housing
- Supported living
- Friendly caller program
