= Sidney Katz =

American physician and scientist (1924 – 2012)

- Born: 1924; Cleveland, Ohio, U.S.
- Died: May 4, 2012 (aged 87–88)
- Known for: Index of Independence of Activities for Daily Living (ADLs)

Academic background
- Education: Western Reserve University Medical School (Case Western Reserve University School of Medicine)

Academic work
- Doctoral students: Gary Lopaschuk

Sidney Katz, MD (1924–May 4, 2012) was a pioneering American physician, scientist, educator, author, and public servant who developed the Index of Independence of Activities for Daily Living (ADLs) in a career spanning more than sixty years. He made several other advances in geriatric care, including the U.S. Nursing Home Reform Act of 1987, which established basic rights for nursing home residents. Katz received several public and private awards, including the Maxwell A. Pollak Award (1993) and the American Geriatrics Society’s (AGS) Foundation for Health in Aging (2001). The AGS award was also won by former US President Jimmy Carter and poet Maya Angelou.

Katz held several academic positions, including Professor Emeritus of Geriatric Medicine at Columbia University, and distinguished scholar at the Benjamin Rose Institute on Aging. He was a lifetime member of the National Academy of Sciences’ Institute of Medicine (IoM), serving as the head of IoM’s Committee on Nursing Home Regulation from 1983 to 1985. During his time leading the committee, Katz initiated a review of current nursing home conditions; the committee developed a report that recommended an extensive redesign of nursing home policies, regulations, and standards. These recommendations were adopted into Omnibus Budget Reconciliation Act of 1987 (OBRA-87), commonly known as the Nursing Home Reform Act of 1987, which mandated standardized nursing home patient rights and enforced new regulatory requirements to ensure equal treatment of nursing home residents.

Katz worked until the age of 87, retiring in 2011. He died at home on May 4, 2012.

== Early life, family, education and medical career ==
Sidney Katz was born in Cleveland, Ohio, in 1924. His father owned a dry goods shop, and his mother ran the household and kept the books for the business. Katz credits his mother for encouraging his education and his medical career.

After high school, Katz was unable to study for a medical degree due to the onset of World War II. He volunteered for the US Navy in 1942, at the age of 18, and was assigned to various medical details including running the health services department at Purdue University for enlisted men. During his service, Katz was eventually promoted to become a functioning specialist in nursing surgery.

While at Purdue University, he became interested in virology, and was accepted at Western Reserve Medical School (now Case Western Reserve University School of Medicine). He remained there after his service, and he continued to research in virology. Upon graduation in 1948, he received a fellowship from the American Cancer Society.

Shortly afterwards, Katz volunteered to serve in the Army during the Korean War. During this service he was responsible for a Mobile Army Surgical Hospital (MASH) unit with two other physicians. One of the main goals of this unit was to fight the growing hemorrhagic fever epidemic that had infected 1,000 men, killing 10%. Katz and his colleagues were the first physicians to truly describe both the disease and the effectiveness of known cures. The cures that seemed to be most effective were compiled into a protocol that was used to standardize treatment of the disease. Through this work, Katz lowered the mortality rate of the disease from 10% to 1%.

After leaving the Army, Katz joined the Benjamin Rose Rehabilitation Hospital in Cleveland where he studied the effect of vitamins on elderly patients.

== Index of Independence of Activities for Daily Living ==
As Katz began to understand more about the medicine sub-specialty of long-term care for elderly adults, his team at Benjamin Rose began to gather data on how different treatments affected patient outcomes. Katz’s first attempt at formally capturing this data was to study 64 hip fracture patients during an 18-month period. Comprehensive data on treatments, patient progression, and outcomes were collected during this study. After analyzing the study data, the researchers discovered that patients that were most independent could all perform a set of basic activities, ranging from the most complex bathing activity to the least complex feeding activity. From this data, Katz developed a scale to score a patient's ability to live independently. This scale was called the index of activities for daily living, and was first published in the 1963 in the Journal of the American Medical Association (JAMA); it had been cited more than 46,000 times by 2012. Katz and his team at Benjamin Rose Rehabilitation Hospital spent the next ten years revising the scale, including a more, diverse patient population.

== Advisory service ==
While still working on developing the ADL scale, Katz became involved in the national healthcare community. In 1965 he became an active member of the working groups of the National Center for Health Services Research. In 1978 he was appointed to the National Academy of Sciences' Institute of Medicine (IoM).

In 1977 and 1978 Katz sat on the Long-Term care Technical Advisory Panel of the National Center for Health Statistics, where he first introduced the Minimum Basic Data Set for Long-Term Care.

In 1981 he was appointed as a Special Advisor to the White House Conference on Aging, and a Senior Advisor to the United States Preventive Services Task Force.

In 1983 Katz was appointed for two years to lead IoM's Committee on Nursing Home Regulation. He facilitated a comprehensive review of current practice and care guidelines to base the committee's recommendations on science as far as possible. Katz's committee recommended sweeping changes to the standard of care, audit procedures, and better enforcement of quality assurance practices by both nursing home facilities and oversight organizations. The IoM committee recommendations were incorporated into OBRA-87 legislation, which was signed into law in 1987 by President Ronald Reagan. Katz's recommendations also paved the way towards the 1991 mandate, as part of the Minimum Data Set legislation, that requires nursing homes to complete the national resident assessment system to ensure quality of life for residents.

Katz became a lifetime member of the National Academy of Sciences' Institute of Medicine. He advised several legislators, the Department of Health and Human Services, and non-profit organizations on healthcare issues. He also provided international consultation for the United Nations and for several countries including Sweden, France, and the United Kingdom.

== Representative papers and technical reports ==
- Katz, S., & Stroud, M. W., 3rd. (1989). "Functional assessment in geriatrics: a review of progress and directions" Journal of the American Geriatrics Society 37, 267–71.
- Katz, S (1987). "The science of quality life". Journal of Chronic Diseases. 40 (6): 459–63. doi:10.1016/0021-9681(87)90001-4. PMID 3597650.
- Stroud, M. W., Katz, S., & Gooding, B. A. (1985). Rehabilitation of the elderly: A tale of two hospitals. East Lansing, MI: Michigan State University Press.
- Katz, S.; Branch, L.G.; Branson, M.H.; Papsidero, J.A.; Beck, J.C.; Green, D.S. (1983). "Active life expectancy". The New England Journal of Medicine. 309 (20): 1218–24. doi:10.1056/NEJM198311173092005. PMID 6633571.
- U.S. National Committee on Vital and Health Statistics Technical Consultant Panel on the Long-Term Health Care Data Set. (1980). Long-term health care: Minimum data set (DHHS Publication No. [PHS] 80–1158). Hyattsville, MD: U.S. Dept. of Health and Human Services, Public Health Service, Office of Health Research, Statistics, and Technology, National Center for Health Statistics.
- Papsidero, J. A., Katz, S., Kroger, M. H., & Akpom, C. A. (Eds.). (1979). Chance for change: Implications of a chronic disease module study. East Lansing, MI: Michigan State University Press.
- Katz, S.; Downs, T.D.; Cash, H.R.; Grotz, R.C. (1970). "Progress in development of the index of ADL". The Gerontologist. 10 (1 Part 1): 20–30. doi:10.1093/geront/10.1_Part_1.20. PMID 5420677.
- Katz, S., Ford, A. B., Downs, T. D., Adams, M., & Rusby, D. I. (1972). Effects of continued care: A study of chronic illness in the home DHEW Publication No. [HSM] 73–3010). Rockville, MD: National Center for Health Services Research and Development.
- Katz, S.; Ford, A. B.; Moskowitz, R. W.; Jackson, B. A.; Jaffe, M. W. (1963). "Studies of illness in the aged. The index of adl: A standardized measure of biological and psychosocial function". Journal of the American Medical Association. 185 (12): 914–19. doi:10.1001/jama.1963.03060120024016. PMID 14044222.
- Staff of the Benjamin Rose Hospital (1959). "Multidisciplinary studies of illness in aged persons: II. A new classification of functional status in activities of daily living". Journal of Chronic Diseases. 9 (1): 55–62. doi:10.1016/0021-9681(59)90137-7. PMID 13611014.
- Katz, S.; Leedham, C. L.; Kessler, W. H. (1952). "Medical management of hemorrhagic fever". Journal of the American Medical Association. 150 (14): 1363–66. doi:10.1001/jama.1952.03680140001001. PMID 12990429.
