= When You Remember Me =

1990 television film directed by Harry Winer

- Genre: Biography; Drama
- Written by: Jerry McNeely; Cynthia Whitcomb
- Directed by: Harry Winer
- Starring: Fred Savage; Kevin Spacey; Ellen Burstyn
- Music by: J. Peter Robinson; Yanni
- Country of origin: United States
- Original language: English

Production
- Executive producers: David L. Wolper; Bernard Sofronski
- Producer: Vahan Moosekian
- Cinematography: Johnny E. Jensen
- Editor: Paul Rubell
- Running time: 91 minutes
- Production companies: Warner Bros. Television; David L. Wolper Productions

Original release
- Network: ABC
- Release: October 7, 1990

When You Remember Me is a 1990 American made-for-television biographical drama film directed by Harry Winer and starring Fred Savage, Kevin Spacey, and Ellen Burstyn. The film premiered on ABC on October 7, 1990. The screenplay is based on a story featured in Reader's Digest from writer Rena Dictor LeBlanc, and tells the story of Michael Patrick Smith, a young man who filed a lawsuit in the early 1970s that led to improved conditions for nursing home patients nationwide.

== Plot ==
Mike Mills is a teen with muscular dystrophy, whose destitute single mother who has three other children to care for, placed him in a state nursing home, where he contends with being a young person in the clinic and with an abusive head nurse (reminiscent of Nurse Ratched from One Flew Over the Cuckoo's Nest), while the nursing homes recreation director Wade Blank, a friend to Mike at the nursing home, started ADAPT, a grassroots national disability rights group in Denver in the 1980s.

== Cast ==
- Fred Savage as Mike Mills
- Kevin Spacey as Wade Blank
- Ellen Burstyn as Nurse Cooder
- Richard Jenkins as Vaughan
- Dwier Brown as John Harlen
- Lee Garlington as Joanne
- Ving Rhames as Leon
- Dean Norris as Bill

== Background ==
Michael Patrick Smith was diagnosed at age six as having Duchenne's muscular dystrophy. At age fourteen, his mother made the decision to place him in a nursing home, and he died two and a half years later on October 1, 1975. Before he died, with the help of Legal Aid lawyers, Smith filed a class-action suit on behalf of the civil rights of the disabled. The courts eventually found in the plaintiffs favor, eleven years after Smith had died. In 1987, a federal judge found U.S. Secretary of Health Otis Bowen in contempt of court for failing to set adequate standards for inspecting nursing homes.

Michael Patrick Smith was a severely disabled 21-year-old man living in a Lakewood, Colorado, nursing home. Michael had muscular dystrophy and was so gravely ill that he required hospitalization. While he was hospitalized, his $25 monthly Medicaid personal needs check was allegedly improperly endorsed and cashed by nursing home personnel without his permission. Also, Smith was a poet and complained that no one at the nursing home would take the time to write down the stanzas he composed in his head. These complaints, together with those of several other residents of the nursing home, led to the filing of a major class action lawsuit in May 1975. Michael's contact with the Legal Aid Society resulted in the threat of immediate eviction from his nursing home.

== Production ==
Savage relayed how he worked with a therapist who works with people who have muscular dystrophy, and "she helped me a lot in getting prepared for this". He noted that "you have to learn how to do certain movements and motions, because the character has Duchenne's muscular dystrophy, so it's not a case of teaching someone how to portray 'muscular dystrophy', each type immobilizes a specific part of the body, so it was really hard to do". Savage also recalled meeting with some boys who had Duchenne's, "to help me get the idea of what it was like". He additionally noted that the producers used "handicapped people as extras all through the movie".

Executive producer Bernard Sofronski said they had to portray Michael Patrick Smith a "few years younger than he was because we wanted Fred Savage to play the role ... the real Michael entered the home around age 12 and lived longer than we show". Sofronski stated the "events that took place in the home, they are absolutely true as dramatized ... in terms of who he is; right on the dime, his spunk, the games he played, how he got things done, all true". He also noted that the real social worker, Wade Blank, and the real lawyer, John Harlen, as well as the mother, "worked hand and foot with them every day on this film". Sofronski went on to say that the trio agreed "the conditions were worse than what we dramatized ... and we could have gone deeper, but nobody would watch the movie".

== Reception ==
American film critic Ray Richmond was impressed with Savage's acting skills, writing "his underappreciated acting range has never been more evident than it is in When You Remember Me, a shamelessly melodramatic and manipulative ABC telefilm that nonetheless works in moving you, because of Savage". Richmond went on to say that he was "compelled" by the film, and it is "impossible to ignore Savage and his dynamic work. He handles his role's physical demands with impressive and believable ease, and his emotive skills are right on target. A lesser actor would have stumbled. Savage did not. In fact, he keeps the film from washing away in a sea of hokum".

Mike Duffy of Knight-Ridder Newspapers was similarly impressed with Savage's acting, writing "Savage is one of the most likable young performers on television ... and the story delves into the sad, dark side of another character's bittersweet wonder years ... it is also a formula affliction-and-uplift TV movie featuring tears, courage and sentiment". He praised the film for being a "cut above the formula pack and so is Savage's performance ... and thanks to him, a superb supporting cast and the classy touches of production by David Wolper ... it is a well told story blessed with a touch of humanity ... and makes for good absorbing television".

In her review for the National Newspaper Association, Dianne Piastro says the film "does an excellent job of chronicling Michael Smith's story ... and although Savage is not disabled, he does a believable job of portraying Michael's disability and his emotional struggle, and while many viewers will find it hard to believe, the callous nursing home staff and dehumanizing conditions are also very realistically portrayed". She further opined that the message of the film was to "make us realize Michael Patrick Smith was a human being who deserved to be afforded as much dignity and control of his life as anyone else".

Paul Henniger of The Star-Ledger, highlighted Ellen Burstyn's character as being a "straight-laced, insensitive head nurse, reminiscent of Louise Fletcher's brilliant role in One Flew Over the Cuckoo's Nest, and she plays it to the hilt". He also complimented Savage's portrayal of "gregarious Mike that illuminates the film; he has mastered all the limited movements and mannerisms of a muscular dystrophy patient who is getting progressively worse ... and there's a parallel - though true-to-life here - to the fictional role Jack Nicholson played in Cuckoo's Nest ... young Mike stimulates in each of his fellow patients an awakening spirt of self-worth, freeing them from their passive acceptance of the domination by the nursing home authorities".

Paul Novoselick opined in The Muskegon Chronicle, that the "movie graphically showed how poor nursing home care can be; how badly patients can be abused through neglect and ignorance ... patients were daily lined up to receive doses of mind-numbing and mood-altering drugs ... their social security checks were seized before they could see them ... their television viewing was monitored ... they were shown with sometimes overflowing urine bags ... they were sometimes forced to lay naked on cots in public hallways while waiting for showers ... demeaning and disgusting, stripped of their dignity". He also felt that "Savage only did a marginal job of portraying a physically weakened young man with advanced stages of MD".

== See also ==
- Omnibus Budget Reconciliation Act of 1987
- Nursing Home Reform Act
