= Activities of daily living =

Healthcare term about self-care activities

Activities of daily living (ADLs) is a term used in healthcare to refer to an individual's daily self-care activities. Health professionals often use a person's ability or inability to perform ADLs as a measure of their functional status. The concept of ADLs was originally proposed in the 1950s by Sidney Katz and his team at the Benjamin Rose Hospital in Cleveland, Ohio. Since then, numerous researchers have expanded on the concept of ADLs. For instance, many indexes that assess ADLs incorporate measures of mobility.

In 1969, Lawton and Brody developed the concept of instrumental activities of daily living (IADLs) to capture the range of activities that support independent living. These are often utilized in caring for individuals with disabilities, injuries, and the elderly. Younger children often require help from adults to perform ADLs, as they have not yet developed the skills necessary to perform them independently. Aging and disabilities, affecting individuals across different age groups, can significantly alter a person's daily life. Such changes must be carefully managed to maintain health and well-being.

Common activities of daily living (ADLs) include feeding oneself, bathing, dressing, grooming, working, homemaking, and managing personal hygiene after using the toilet. A number of national surveys have collected data on the ADL status of the U.S. population. Although basic definitions of ADLs are established, what specifically constitutes a particular ADL can vary for each individual. Cultural background and education level are among the factors that can influence a person's perception of their functional abilities.

ADLs are categorized into basic self-care tasks (typically learned in infancy) or instrumental tasks generally learned throughout adolescence. A person who cannot perform essential ADLs may have a poorer quality of life or be unsafe in their current living conditions; therefore, they may require the help of other individuals and/or mechanical devices. Examples of mechanical devices to aid in ADLs include electric lifting chairs, bathtub transfer benches and ramps to replace stairs.

== Basic ==
Basic ADLs consist of self-care tasks that include:

- Bathing and showering
- Personal hygiene and grooming, which encompasses brushing, combing, and styling hair
- Dressing
- Toilet hygiene, which involves getting to the toilet, cleaning oneself, and getting back up
- Functional mobility, often referred to as "transferring." This includes the ability to walk, get in and out of bed, and get into and out of a chair. The broader definition covers moving from one place to another while performing activities and is useful for people with varying physical abilities who can still move around independently.
- Self-feeding, which is limited to the act of eating itself, as opposed to assisted feeding

The Functional Independence Measure (FIM) is a tool developed in 1983 that uses a 0 to 7 scale to evaluate different ADLs based on the level of assistance required. A score of 7 indicates that the individual is independent, while a score of 0 signifies that the individual cannot perform the activity without assistance.

The specific breakdown of the scale is shown below:

7 - Complete Independence

6 - Modified Independence

5 - Supervision or Setup

4 - Minimal Assistance

3 - Moderate Assistance

2 - Maximal Assistance

1 - Total Assistance

0 - Activity Does Not Occur

== Instrumental ==
Instrumental activities of daily living (IADLs) are not essential for basic day-to-day functioning, but they enable an individual to maintain a level of independence in a community.

- Cleaning and maintaining the house
- Managing money
- Moving within the community
- Preparing meals
- Shopping for groceries and other necessities
- Taking prescribed medications
- Using the telephone or other forms of communication

Occupational therapists often evaluate IADLs during patient assessments. The American Occupational Therapy Association identifies 12 types of IADLs, which may be performed individually or as co-occupations with others.

- Care of others (including selecting and supervising caregivers)
- Care of pets
- Child rearing
- Communication management
- Community mobility
- Financial management
- Health management and maintenance
- Home establishment and maintenance
- Meal preparation and cleanup
- Religious observances
- Safety procedures and emergency responses
- Shopping

== Therapy ==
Occupational therapists evaluate and use therapeutic interventions to rebuild the skills required to maintain, regain, or increase a person's independence in all Activities of Daily Living may have diminished due to physical or mental health conditions, injuries, or age-related impairments.

Physical therapists employ exercises to help patients maintain and improve independence in ADLs. The exercise program is tailored to the patient's specific deficits, which may include walking speed, strength, balance, and coordination. A slow walking speed has been linked to an increased risk of falls; thus, exercises that enhance walking speed are crucial for safer and more functional ambulation. After initiating an exercise program, it is important to maintain the routine. Otherwise, the benefits will be lost. For frail patients, regular exercise is vital in preserving functional independence and preventing the need for external assistance or placement in a long-term care facility.

== Assistance ==
Skills in assisting with ADLs are required in nursing and other professions, such as nursing assistants in hospitals, nursing homes, assisted living facilities, and other long-term care settings. This includes assisting in patient mobility, such as repositioning an activity-intolerant patient in bed. Hygiene assistance may involve giving bed baths and helping with urinary and bowel elimination. Personal care assistants are required to adhere to established standards of care. Personal assistance is defined as wagered support of 20 or more hours a week for people with impairments. A 2008 review suggested that personal assistance may offer benefits to some elderly individuals and their informal caretakers. Further research is required to evaluate the efficiency of different personal assistance models and their overall costs.

== Caretaker requirements ==
In community residential care settings, it is essential for personal assistants, doctors, and nurses to recognize that illness can alter a patient's mental state, affecting their reactions to change and possibly leading to behaviors such as fussiness or capriciousness. Providing care with patience, tact, concentration, discipline, and compassion is crucial to building trust with patients, maintaining their confidence, and supporting the success of their treatment and recovery.

Because nursing care requires a great deal of attention and energy, nursing staff in some countries are often required to have national license as nurses, such as having passed the NCLEX. Nursing care is usually divided into general and specialized care. Particular difficulties arise when caring for the severely ill. A healthy workspace is an important factor. If caregivers are mistreated or burnt out, it can lead to residents being neglected and mistreated.

== Special care needs ==
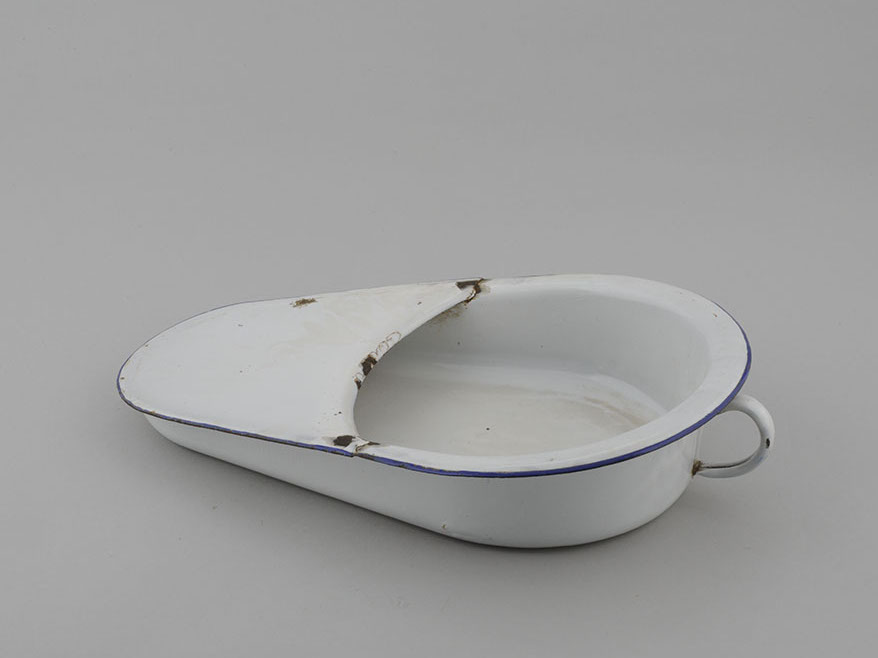
A fracture bedpan used for those with hip fractures

=== Mobility ===
Patients who are immobile should be repositioned at least every two hours to prevent the development of pressure ulcers, commonly known as bed sores. Repositioning hospitalized patients also offers additional benefits, such as a reduced risk of deep vein thrombosis, fewer pressure ulcers, and less functional decline. To protect the patient's head from injury during repositioning, a pillow is commonly placed at the head of the bed. To move a bedridden patient up in bed, caregivers utilize either a friction-reducing sheet or a draw sheet.

=== Bathing ===
A bed bath involves using a bath blanket to cover the patient, ensuring that only the area being washed is exposed at any given time. This practice maintains privacy and keeps the patient warm. Typically, the eyes are cleansed first, using water without soap to prevent irritation. Each eye should be cleaned from the inner corner near the nose outward, to avoid transferring debris to the tear duct. A clean section of the cloth is used, or the cloth is rinsed before cleaning the second eye, to prevent the spreading of any organisms. After washing, each area is dried before moving on to the next.

Perineal care follows a specific protocol to minimize the transfer of microorganisms. The perineum should be washed from the least contaminated area to the most contaminated area. In females, this involves spreading the labia and washing from the pubic area toward the anal area, never in reverse. For males, the tip of the penis is cleansed first, moving away from the urethral opening (meatus). The foreskin is gently retracted, washed, and then promptly returned to its original position to prevent restricting circulation. For children, the foreskin is not retracted to avoid injury.

=== Toileting ===
A bedpan is used for bed-bound patients for bowel elimination as well as urinary elimination for females. The head of the bed is raised to assist in voiding or defecating.

=== Dressing ===
For individuals with one side weaker than the other (e.g., due to a stroke), it is recommended to dress the weaker side first using the stronger arm. Conversely, when undressing, the stronger side should be undressed first.

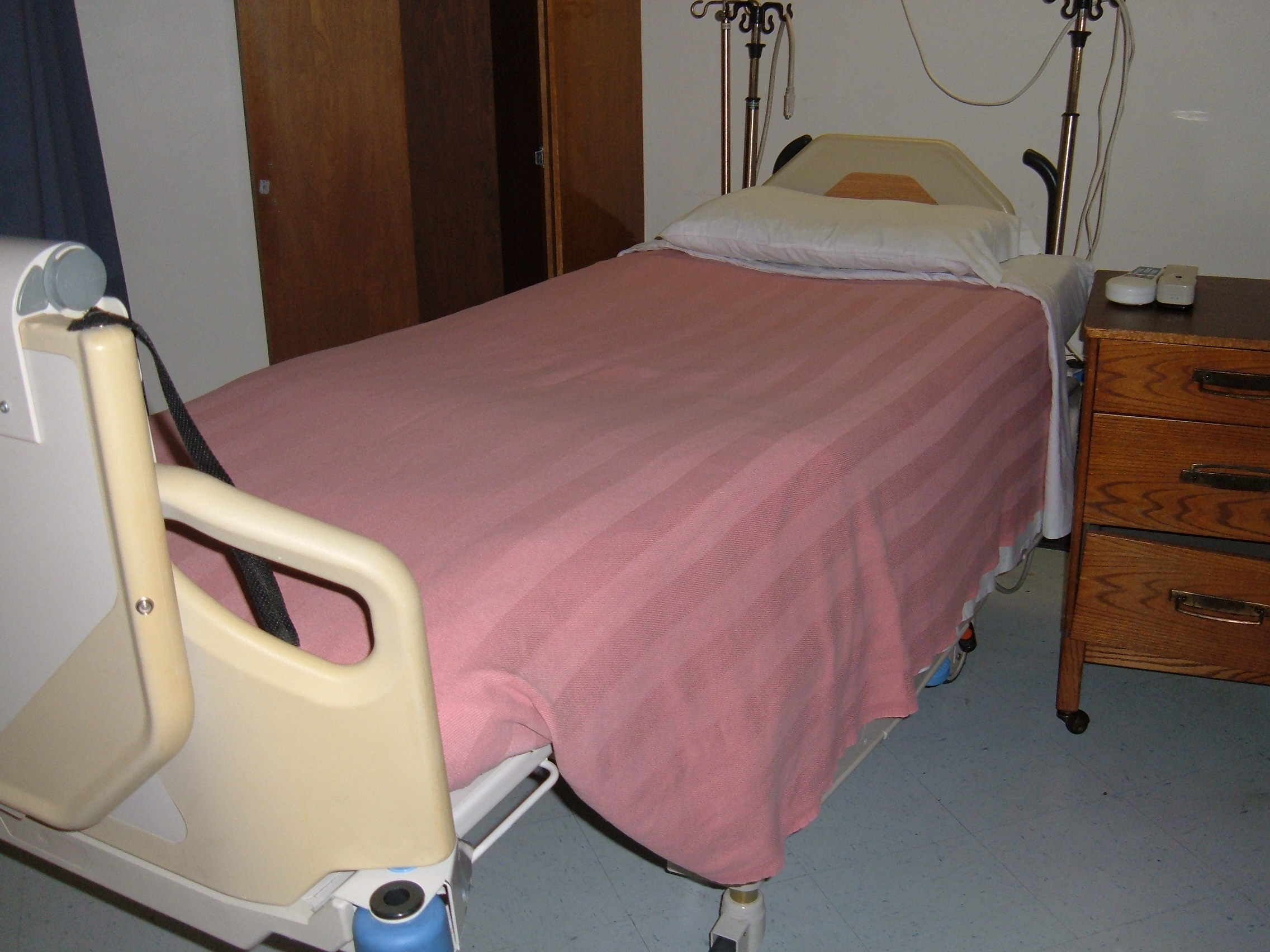
Hospital bed with mitred corners

When making an occupied bed, for instance for patients who cannot or have difficulty getting out of bed, the bed is made one side at a time. However, for patients for whom rolling to the side is contraindicated, such as those recovering from hip replacement surgery, the process is modified. These patients are assisted into a sitting position while the caregiver makes the top half of the bed. Once completed, the patient is then helped to lie back while the bottom half of the bed is made.

=== Feeding ===
To maintain self-esteem, patients are involved as much as possible in their care. Their preferences for the order of consuming their meal items are respected. Condiments are provided, and food is prepared according to each patient's preferences. Adequate liquid is supplied with the meal. Necessary aids such as dentures, hearing aids, and glasses are put in place before mealtime. Oral hygiene is important after eating and includes brushing teeth, cleaning dentures, and using mouthwash. For those with dysphagia, patients must be placed on aspiration precautions. The feeding rate and bite sizes are tailored to each patient's tolerance. Dietary modifications, as recommended by a nutrition consultation, can include chopping, mincing, pureeing, or adding thickeners to make swallowing easier. For patients with visual impairments, a clock face analogy is commonly used to describe the position of meal items. When not contraindicated by dysphagia, straws are provided to help prevent spills.

=== Suicide precautions ===
For individuals on suicide watch, meals are provided in plastic or paper containers accompanied by plastic utensils (excluding knives), and the use of sharp objects is permitted only under continuous staff supervision.

=== Bed making ===
A fitted sheet is placed over the mattress of a hospital bed. Often, a draw sheet (also known as a lift sheet) is laid on top of the fitted sheet at the center, where it will lie beneath the patient's midsection. The draw sheet is commonly used to assist in lifting or repositioning the patient. Sheets positioned under the patient are securely tucked in to prevent the formation of wrinkles, which can contribute to skin breakdown. A top sheet and a blanket are then placed over the bed, with the corners neatly mitered.

=== Wound care ===
Wound dressings can be categorized into several types, including hydrocolloid, hydrogel, alginate, collagen, foam, transparent, and cloth dressings.

== Evaluation ==
Several evaluation tools are available to assess Activities of Daily Living (ADL) and Instrumental Activities of Daily Living (IADL), including the Katz ADL scale, the Older Americans Resources and Services (OARS) ADL/IADL scale, the Lawton IADL scale, and the Bristol Activities of Daily Living Scale.

In the domain of disability, measures have been developed to capture functional recovery in performing basic activities of daily living. Amongst them, some measures like the Functional Independence Measure are designed for assessment across a wide range of disabilities. Others like the Spinal Cord Independence Measure are designed to evaluate participants in a specific type of disability.

Most models of health care service use ADL evaluations in their practice, including the medical (or institutional) models, such as the Roper–Logan–Tierney model of nursing, and the resident-centered models, such as the Program of All-Inclusive Care for the Elderly (PACE).

Pervasive computing technology was considered to determine the wellness of the elderly living independently in their homes. The framework of the intelligent system consists of monitoring important daily activities through the observation of everyday object usage. The improved wellness indices helped in reducing false warnings related to the daily activities of elderly living.

=== Research ===
ADL evaluations are increasingly used in epidemiological studies as a measure of health in later life that does not focus exclusively on specific ailments. Unlike studies investigating specific disease outcomes, research employing ADL assessments is sensitive to a wider range of health effects, including those with lower levels of impact. ADL is measured on a continuous scale, which simplifies the research process.

Sidney Katz conducted a study of 64 hip fracture patients over an 18-month period, collecting comprehensive data on their treatments, progression, and outcomes. Analysis of the data revealed that the patients perceived as most independent were able to perform a range of basic activities, from the more complex task of bathing to the simpler one of feeding themselves. Based on these findings, Katz developed a scale to evaluate a patient's capacity for living. This scale was first published in the 1963 Journal of the American Medical Association and has been cited over 1,000 times since its publication.

Although the scale offers a standardized measure of psychological and biological function, the process of arriving at this assumption has been criticized. Specifically, Porter has argued for a phenomenological approach noting that:

Katz et al. (1963) made a claim that became the basis for the ontological assumptions of the ADL research tradition. In their suggestion that there was an "ordered regression [in skills] as part of the natural process of aging" (p. 918), there was an implicit generalization, from their sample of older persons with fractured hips to all older persons.

Porter emphasizes the possible disease-specific nature of ADLs (being derived from hip-fracture patients), the need for an objective definition of ADLs, and the possible value of adding additional functional measures.

A systematic review examined the effectiveness of programmes designed to teach activities of daily living skills, specifically to individuals with schizophrenia:

Life skills programme compared to standard care
Summary
Currently, there is no good evidence to suggest ADL skills programmes are effective for people with chronic mental illnesses. More robust data is needed from studies that are adequately powered to determine whether skills training is beneficial for people with chronic mental health problems.

Outcome	Findings in words	Findings in numbers	Quality of evidence
Life skills – no important change
in household activity skills.; Follow-up: mean 12 weeks	Life skills programmes may reduce the risk of not improving in day-to-day functioning for general household activity skills when compared with standard care, but, at present, it is not possible to be confident about the difference between the two treatments and data supporting this finding are very limited.	RR 0.24 (0.01 to 4.72)	Very low
in laundry skills.; Follow-up: mean 12 weeks	Life skills programmes may reduce the risk of not improving in day-to-day functioning for laundry skills when compared with standard care, but, at present it is not possible to be confident about the difference between the two treatments and data supporting this finding are very limited.	RR 0.14 (0.01 to 2.38)	Very low
in self-care skills.; Follow-up: mean 12 weeks	Life skills programmes make no difference to self-care when compared with standard care, but, at present it is not possible to be confident about the difference between these two treatments. This finding is based on data of very limited quality.	RR 1 (0.28 to 3.54)	Very low
Leaving the study early
Leaving the study early Follow-up: 6 to 16 weeks	Life skills programme makes no clear difference to the risk of loss to follow-up compared with standard care. Data supporting this finding are very limited.	RR 1.16 (0.4 to 3.36)	Very low
Mental state
Average score. (Positive and Negative Syndrome Scale – positive syndrome). Follow-up: mean 24 weeks	People receiving life skills programme scored the same as people receiving standard care. Findings are based on data of very limited quality.*	MD 0 (3.12 lower to 3.12 higher )	Very low
Quality of life
Average score (Quality of Well-Being Scale index). Follow-up: mean 24 weeks	On average, people receiving a life skills programme scored 0.02 lower than people treated with standard care. There was no clear difference between the groups and this finding is based on data of very limited quality.*	MD 0.02 lower (0.07 lower to 0.03 higher)	Very low
	* At present the meaning of these scores in day-to-day care is unclear.		

== See also ==
- Schwab and England ADL scale
- Global Assessment of Functioning
- Long term care insurance
