= Issues for people with epilepsy =

Epilepsy is a condition defined by unprovoked or reflex seizures, often occurring without warning. The condition impacts much of a patient's life, including personal safety, memory, and views by others. Those who have active seizures live with the fact that they can have a seizure at any time. Those whose seizures are controlled by medication live with the underlying side effects and the need to remember to take the medication at the correct times.

== Mental health ==
=== Cognition ===
Most people with epilepsy have normal cognition levels at most times. When not during or immediately proceeding a seizure, a person with epilepsy generally is physically and mentally capable of everything a person without epilepsy can do.

A seizure can be disruptive to the process of normal life. During the seizure, depending on the type, the patient may be totally or partially unconscious, and out of commission to perform normal activities. Following the seizure the patient may be confused and disoriented for a period of time. The patient may also require rest after the seizure.

Following a seizure, many people do not have memory of a period of time immediately before the seizure.

=== Depression ===
Depression is very common among people with epilepsy, with rates as high as 20% for those whose seizures are successfully controlled, and 60% for those with uncontrolled seizures. Suicide is ten times as likely for people with epilepsy than it is for others.

== Personal safety ==
Personal safety is a major concern for persons with epilepsy. When sudden loss of consciousness occurs without warning, the patient is at risk for personal injury and possibly causing injury to others through loss of control or awareness of one's own body.

Many activities of daily living can be dangerous for people with epilepsy, such as bathing, cooking, or walking up or down steps. These can be remedied by taking showers as opposed to tub baths, cooking with a microwave oven rather than an open flame, and living on a ground level.

Certain high-risk sports, such as swimming, scuba diving, or snorkeling are considered dangerous for people with epilepsy. But they pose a level of danger for all participants. They can be equally safe for people with epilepsy and others if carried out with proper safety precautions.

=== Driving ===
The operation of a motor vehicle can be hazardous for people with epilepsy because the driver can lose consciousness behind the wheel, and therefore, control of the vehicle, putting themselves and the public at risk. For those whose seizures are successfully controlled, many of the medications have side effects that cause drowsiness, also impacting driving. As a result, many countries and states place restrictions on driving such as a necessity to be seizure-free for a period of time before being allowed to drive.

== Social issues ==
Epilepsy can have tremendous social issues for patients.

Social acceptance from others is a common challenge. Though persons with epilepsy are otherwise just like anyone else, there are stigmas associated with epilepsy that can affect one's acceptance among others.

Depression is common due to impaired social acceptance.

== Employment ==
Many people with epilepsy have trouble with employment due to safety performing job duties, loss of work time during and after seizures, and transportation to and from a place of employment.

== Children with epilepsy ==
The social stigma can stand in the way, as the child is more prone to bullying.

Epilepsy can force a child to be left out of activities common for children to be involved in, such as sports.

Epilepsy can affect a child's education. The child may be forced to miss a lot of school due to seizures. The seizures can impair a child's ability to memorize learning materials.
