= Nursing home residents' rights =

Human rights of people living in nursing homes

Nursing home residents' rights are the legal and moral rights of the residents of a nursing home. Legislation exists in various jurisdictions to protect such rights. An early example of a statute protecting such rights is Florida statute 400.022, enacted in 1980, and commonly known as the Residents' Rights Act.

Specific rights protected vary greatly by jurisdiction. Types of rights protected include: dignity, medical privacy, pecuniary, dietary and visitation rights. Process rights, such as right of complaint, are also sometimes protected.

== Motivations for residents' rights ==
In the United States, concerns about poor quality care and ineffective regulation of nursing homes date back to the 1970s. Early regulation focused on the ability of nursing homes to provide care, rather than on the quality of the care provided or the experience of the individuals receiving care. In the 1980s, particularly in response to an influential Institute of Medicine (IoM) report, the US federal government moved to address these concerns by enacting more resident-focused regulations, and among these were a number of new quality-of-life rights for residents of nursing homes. Similar concerns over quality of care motivated people in other countries to advocate for residents' rights.

== Australia ==
Advocates for residents' rights in Australia have established a Charter of Residents' Rights and Responsibilities and the Department of Health and Ageing provides an official unit to deal with complaints. In 1987, the government introduced substantial reform and regulation which included a program to monitor standards.

== Canada ==
Nursing home residents' rights in Canada appear to have been primarily legislated at the provincial level. In Ontario, for instance, the Long Term Care Homes Act 2007 contains a "Residents' Bill of Rights", including, inter alia, the rights to be treated with courtesy and respect; to privacy in treatment; to be informed of one's medical condition and treatment; to consent to or refuse treatment; to confidentiality of medical records and treatment; to receive visitors; and, when near death, to have family members present 24 hours a day.

== New Zealand ==
Since 1994, New Zealand has protected residents rights' (and rights of disabled people more broadly) under the Health and Disability Commissioner Act, including rights to respect, freedom from discrimination and coercion, dignity, communication in a language the resident can understand, information and informed consent, and right of complaint.

== United Kingdom ==
Residents' rights in the UK appear to have been primarily legislated at the country level. In England, for instance, the Care Quality Commission, the health and social care regulator for England, describes national minimum standards under the Care Standards Act 2000 for services in care homes, including dignity and privacy rights, dietary and pecuniary rights, and the right to complain if one is unhappy with the care provided.

== United States ==
Residents' rights in the US are protected at both the federal and state level. However, the legal rights of nursing home residents are currently controversial, as delegation clauses used in many nursing home contracts have been blamed for effectively permitting the rape of residents.

=== Federal law ===
In 1980 the Civil Rights of Institutionalized Persons Act was passed to protect the civil rights of, amongst others, residents of nursing homes and similar facilities.

In 1987, amendments known collectively as the Federal Nursing Home Reform Act, including a robust section on nursing home residents' rights, were attached to an Omnibus Budget Reconciliation Act of 1987 (OBRA '87) which was then enacted into law and codified at section 483 of Volume 42 of the Code of Federal Regulations and related United States Code sections. These required nursing homes to provide facilities to ensure that residents had a high quality of life, good physical and mental activities, and were able to participate in the administration of the home. Appeals to an ombudsman in case of dispute were to be facilitated. However, the act's protections may or may not apply to some nursing home residents whose nursing homes receive only state funds, and do not participate in Medicare or Medicaid. In Health and Hospital Corporation of Marion County v. Talevski, 599 U.S. 166 (2023), the United States Supreme Court held that the provisions of the Federal Nursing Home Reform Act (FNHRA) at issue unambiguously created rights enforceable under Section 1983 of the Ku Klux Klan Act (codified at 42 U.S.C. § 1983), and private enforcement under §1983 is compatible with the FNHRA's remedial scheme. The Supreme Court ruled that a plaintiff can file a federal civil rights claim because of violation of the Federal Nursing Home Reform Act.

Some rights provided by federal law as of 2010 include rights to dignity, privacy, freedom from discrimination, freedom from restraint, to be informed of medical care and treatment, pecuniary rights, visitation, rights of complaint and protection against transfer and unfair discharge. Specific rights include: choice of physician and involvement in treatment options; a right to be admitted without a third-party guarantee as a condition of admission; freedom from improper physical or chemical restraints; freedom from abuse; right to be treated with dignity; right to reasonable accommodation; right to participate in planning care and treatment and any changes in care and treatment; right to informed consent in language patient can understand; right to refuse treatment; right of family and Ombudsman to immediately access resident and have reasonable access to facility; right to privacy, confidentiality, and visitors; a right to not be transferred unless necessary to meet residents' needs, resident no longer requires care, safety of others is endangered, resident has failed to make own payments, or facility no longer operates; right to readmission; right to appeal hearings; right to have necessary care and services for highest practicable well-being; right to have adequate number of personnel; and, various rights respecting the residents' financial matters and need for proper notice and information.

=== State law ===
In addition to the rights required by federal law and regulation, additional rights and protections may be extended to residents of long-term care facilities under state law.

==== California ====
In California, certain rights are protected. As of 2010, these include: a contract will not require the resident to provide advance notice of voluntary discharge; arbitration agreements may not be required as a condition of admission; an arbitration agreement may be rescinded by the resident or his or her agent within 30 days of signing it; a third party guaranty of payment may not be a condition of admission; Facility may not transfer or discharge resident for switching to Medi-Cal, or while qualification for Medi-Cal is still being determined; resident has a right to be notified in writing about discharges and transfers; resident has a right to appeal discharge and transfer decisions; resident has a right to return to a facility after a temporary stay in a hospital—to the first available bed, with Medi-Cal paying for the first seven days; resident has the right to visitors, and to privacy; and, that there shall be an adequate number of personnel on staff.

There are still other protections for California residents, in part, because California incorporates federal law with respect to nursing home protections.

==== Florida ====
Florida enacted nursing home reform in 2016 through its Chapter 400 Residents' Rights legislation. The legislation allows for civil lawsuits brought on behalf of the victim or the victim's survivors, to enforce the resident's rights. This allowed nursing home corporations to be held accountable by juries, thereby creating a financial disincentive to bad nursing home care.

==== Illinois ====
In Illinois, residents in nursing homes have the right to be fully informed of available services and the charges of each service. They have the right to be informed of all facility rules and regulations, including a written copy of all residents rights. Illinois nursing home residents have the right to receive information in a language they understand: English, Spanish, Braille, or any other language they wish to receive it in.

Residents have the right to complain to the staff or any other person without the fear of reprisal and are able to file a complaint with the state survey and certification agency. They have the right to participate in one's own care which includes receiving adequate and appropriate care. And are also able to participate in their own assessment, care-planning, treatment and discharge. Residents are able to refuse any medication or treatments and is always able to review one's medical record. Residents have the right to privacy and confidentiality regarding all medical, personal, or financial affairs.

Residents also have the rights to make independent choices, these include: Making personal decisions such as what to wear and how to spend free time, choose their own physician, participate in community activities that are both inside and outside of the nursing home, organize and participate in a resident council, and manage one's own financial affairs.

==== Wisconsin ====
In Wisconsin, residents have the right to dignity. This means they have the right to be valued as an individual, to maintain and enhance their self-worth, to be treated with courtesy, respect and dignity, free from humiliation, harassment or threats. They have the right to privacy. They have the right to personal privacy during care and treatment, the right to confidentiality concerning their personal and medical information as well as the privacy to send and receive mail without interference. Residents have the right to access quality care for all residents, and to be told in advance about care and treatment, including all risks and benefits.

Residents have the right to remain in the facility unless there is a valid, legal reason for transfer or discharge and the resident will receive a 30-day written notice with the reason for the transfer or discharge, including appeal rights and information. Nursing home residents have the right to be offered choices and allowed to make decisions, and can expect that the facility will accommodate the individuals needs and preferences. Residents have the right to accept or refuse care and treatment, and are able to choose their own health care providers including their doctor and pharmacy of choice.

== See also ==
- Elder rights
