= Fallon Health =

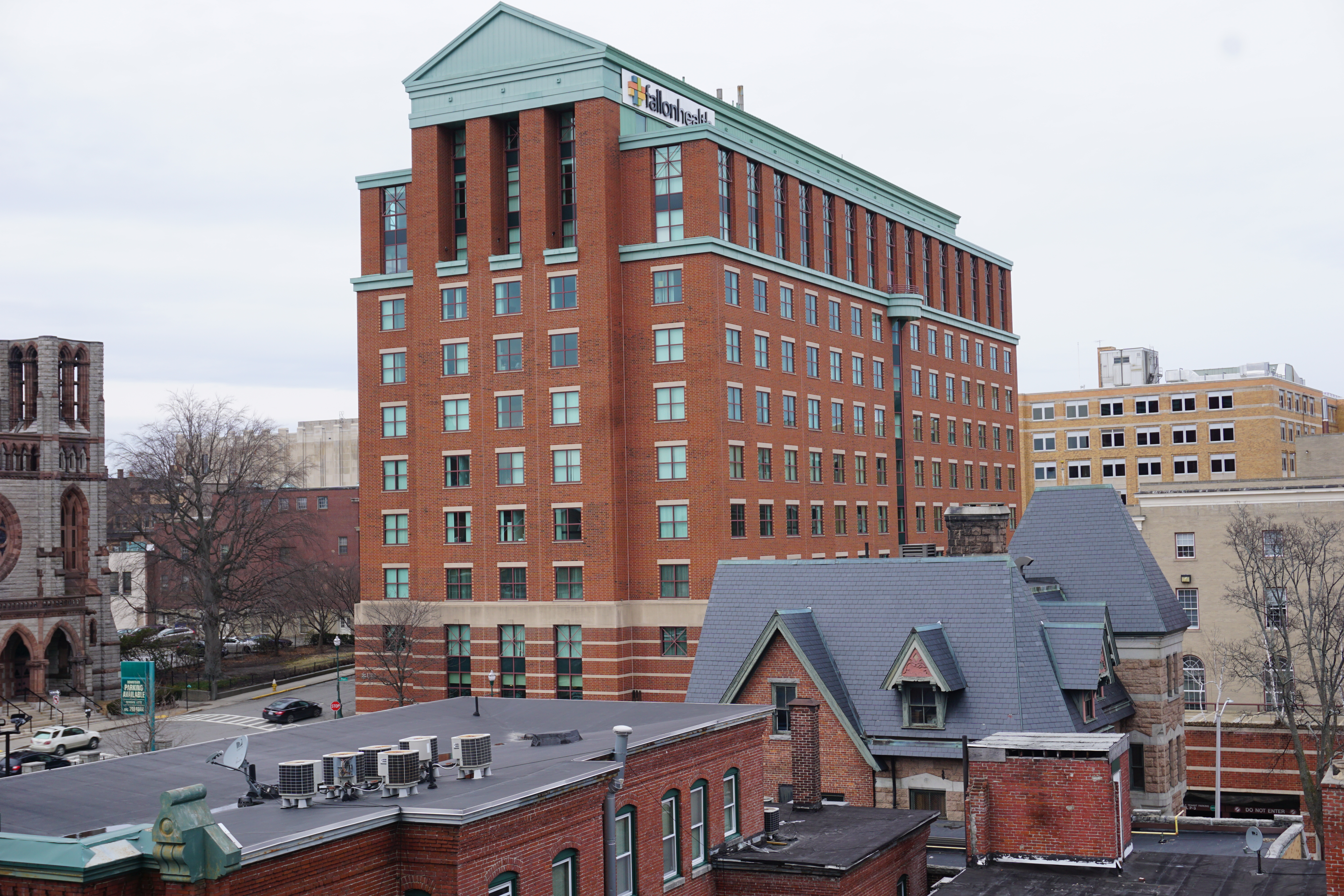
- Company type: Independent
- Industry: Health insurance
- Founded: 1977
- Headquarters: Worcester, Massachusetts
- Products: PPO, HMO, Medicaid, Medicare Advantage, Program of All-Inclusive Care for the Elderly
- Website: fallonhealth.org

Founded in 1977, Fallon Health (formerly Fallon Community Health Plan) is a Worcester, Massachusetts-based provider of health insurance and health care services. In partnership with Weinberg Campus, Fallon Health also operates Fallon Health Weinberg, a health insurance company based in Amherst, New York.

== Products ==
Fallon Health's product portfolio includes HMO, POS and PPO plans as well as Medicaid and Medicare Advantage plans. In addition, Fallon Health offers a Program of All-inclusive Care for the Elderly, called Summit ElderCare®, and a Medicare Advantage Special Needs Plan/Senior Care Options program, called NaviCare.

Fallon Health Weinberg offers a Program of All-Inclusive Care for the Elderly (PACE), a Managed Long Term Care (MLTC) plan and a Medicare Advantage Health Maintenance Organization Special Needs Plan (HMO SNP) to dual-eligible residents of the Western New York counties of Erie and Niagara.
