= Hoehn and Yahr scale =

Medical scale

The Hoehn and Yahr scale is a commonly used system for describing how the symptoms of Parkinson's disease progress. It was originally published in 1967 in the journal Neurology by Margaret Hoehn and Melvin Yahr and included stages 1 through 5. Since then, a modified Hoehn and Yahr scale was proposed with the addition of stages 1.5 and 2.5 to help describe the intermediate course of the disease. It has been shown that HY stage discrimination can be automated, even with patients who cannot support themselves.

Stage	Hoehn and Yahr Scale	Modified Hoehn and Yahr Scale
1	Unilateral involvement only usually with minimal or no functional disability	Unilateral involvement only
1.5	-	Unilateral and axial involvement
2	Bilateral or midline involvement without impairment of balance	Bilateral involvement without impairment of balance
2.5	-	Mild bilateral disease with recovery on pull test
3	Bilateral disease: mild to moderate disability with impaired postural reflexes; physically independent	Mild to moderate bilateral disease; some postural instability; physically independent
4	Severely disabling disease; still able to walk or stand unassisted	Severe disability; still able to walk or stand unassisted
5	Confinement to bed or wheelchair unless aided	Wheelchair bound or bedridden unless aided

The scale is a subset of the Unified Parkinson's Disease Rating Scale, specifically the UPDRS V, allowing a more nuanced assessment of daily activities and non-motor symptoms in the context of disease therapy.

== Time between stages ==
A 2010 study of 695 patients (mean age: 65.2, male: 57.3%) found the median time taken to transit H&Y stages as shown below:

Stage	Median Time to Transit (Months)
1	-
2	20
2.5	62
3	25
4	24
5	26
