= Functional Independence Measure =

- Test of: ascertain function after stroke (or cancer)

The Functional Independence Measure (FIM) is an assessment tool that aims to evaluate the functional status of patients throughout the rehabilitation process following a stroke, traumatic brain injury, spinal cord injury or cancer. Its area of use can include skilled nursing facilities and hospitals aimed at acute, sub-acute and rehabilitation care. Performed on admission to and departure from a rehabilitation hospital, it serves as a consistent data collection tool for the comparison of rehabilitation outcomes across the health care continuum. Furthermore, it aims to allow clinicians to track changes in the functional status of patients from the onset of rehab care through discharge and follow-up. The FIM's assessment of degree of disability depends on the patient's score in 18 categories, focusing on motor and cognitive function. Each category or item is rated on a 7-point scale (1 = <25% independence; total assistance required, 7 = 100% independence). As such, FIM scores may be interpreted to indicate level of independence or level of burden of care. The scale is used to assess how well a person can carry out basic activities of daily living and thus how dependent he or she will be on help from others. Other areas assessed include the physical like how well patients move and walk, and the cognitive, how well they interact with others, communicate, and process information. FIM was originally made for people who had had strokes, but is used to assess disability in other cases as well.
