= Unified Parkinson's Disease Rating Scale =

Rating scale consisting of a conglomerate of other rating scales

- Purpose: used to follow the longitudinal course of Parkinson's disease

The Unified Parkinson's Disease Rating Scale (UPDRS) is used to follow the longitudinal course of Parkinson's disease. The UPD rating scale is the most commonly used scale in the clinical study of Parkinson's disease.

The UPDRS is made up of these sections:

- Part I: evaluation of mentation, behavior, and mood
- Part II: self-evaluation of the activities of daily life (ADLs) including speech, swallowing, handwriting, dressing, hygiene, falling, salivating, turning in bed, walking, and cutting food
- Part III: clinician-scored monitored motor evaluation
- Part IV: complications of therapy
- Part V: Hoehn and Yahr staging of severity of Parkinson's disease
- Part VI: Schwab and England ADL scale

These are evaluated by interview and clinical observation. Some sections require multiple grades assigned to each extremity.

Clinicians and researchers alike use the UPDRS and the motor section in particular to follow the progression of a person's Parkinson's disease. Scientific researchers use it to measure benefits from a given therapy in a more unified and accepted rating system. Neurologists also use it in clinical practice to follow the progression of their patients' symptoms in a more objective manner.

Following the UPDRS scores over time provides insight into the patient's disease progression. For instance Michael J. Fox's symptoms started with a slight tremor, so his motor score would have been less than 10. For most patients, the "mentation, behavior and mood" scores increase later in the disease, but a subset exists for whom those symptoms develop early on.

== Similar rating scales ==
Other rating scales for Parkinson's disease are the Hoehn and Yahr scale and Schwab and England activities of daily living scale, although both of these measures are currently included within the UPDRS in modified format.

== MDS-UPDRS ==
In 2007, the Movement Disorder Society (MDS) published a revision of the UPDRS, known as the MDS-UPDRS. The revision became desirable after an MDS-sponsored Task Force on Rating Scales for Parkinson's Disease highlighted the limitations of the original UPDRS. Two major limitations include the lack of consistent anchor among subscales and the low emphasis on the nonmotor features of PD. The modified UPDRS retains the four-scale structure with a reorganization of the various subscales. Score ranges from 0 to 260, with 0 indicating no disability and 260 indicating total disability. The scales are:

- Part I: Nonmotor experiences of daily living: 13 items. Score range: 0–52, 10 and below is mild, 22 and above is severe.
- Part II: Motor experiences of daily living: 13 items. Score range: 0–52, 12 and below is mild, 30 and above is severe.
- Part III: Motor examination: 18 items. Score range: 0–132, 32 and below is mild, 59 and above is severe.
- Part IV: Motor complications: 6 items. Score range: 0–24, 4 and below is mild, 13 and above is severe.

Each item has 0–4 ratings: 0 (normal), 1 (slight), 2 (mild), 3 (moderate), and 4 (severe).
