= Gary Lopaschuk =

Canadian cardiac researcher (1955–2025)

- Born: June 4, 1955; Port Alberni, British Columbia, Canada
- Died: April 2, 2025 (aged 69); Edmonton, Alberta, Canada
- Awards: Fellow of the Royal Society of Canada (2007)

Academic background
- Education: University of British Columbia (BSc, 1978; MSc, 1980; PhD, 1983)
- Doctoral advisor: John McNeill and Sidney Katz

Academic work
- Discipline: Medicine
- Sub-discipline: Cardiac energy metabolism
- Institutions: University of Alberta

Gary David Lopaschuk (1955–2025) was a Canadian cardiac researcher whose work focused on cardiovascular energy metabolism. He was honoured as a Fellow of the Royal Society of Canada and finished his career as a Distinguished Professor at the University of Alberta.

== Early life and education ==
Gary David Lopaschuk was born on June 4, 1955, in Port Alberni to Bill and Toni Lopaschuk, and he grew up in Smithers, British Columbia with two siblings. He attended the University of British Columbia, from which he earned a Bachelor of Science in pharmacy (1978), Master of Science in pharmacology and toxicology (1980) and Doctor of Philosophy in pharmacology (1983). His doctoral research was supervised by John McNeill and Sidney Katz. Upon graduating, Lopaschuk took on a postdoctoral fellowship at the Penn State Milton S. Hershey Medical Center.

== Career ==
Lopaschuk began his career at the The Hospital for Sick Children, where he worked in pediatrics, pharmacology and cardiology.

Lopaschuk later transferred to the University of Alberta, where he had a long career in the Department of Pediatrics. His research predominantly focused on cardiac energy metabolism. In 2007, Lopaschuk was named a Fellow of the Royal Society of Canada. Three years later, the University of Alberta named him a Distinguished Professor. In 2020, he was awarded the University Cup, the "university's highest honour for faculty members".

In addition to his academic work, Lopaschuk co-founded and served as a board member for the Society of Heart and Vascular Metabolism.

== Personal life ==
Lopaschuk was married and had three children, one of whom died in 2005. He died unexpectedly in Edmonton on April 2, 2025.

After his death, the University of Alberta established the Dr. Gary Lopaschuk Mentorship Award in his honour.

== Books ==
- Lopaschuk, Gary David; Dhalla, Naranjan S., eds. (2014). Cardiac Energy Metabolism in Health and Disease. Springer. doi:10.1007/978-1-4939-1227-8. ISBN 978-1-493-91227-8.
