= On Lok =

On Lok, Inc.
- Formation: 1971
- Headquarters: San Francisco
- CEO: Grace Li
- Website: https://www.onlok.org

On Lok is a community-based organization in the San Francisco Bay Area that offers programs to help seniors stay healthy, active, and socially connected. Founded in 1971, the organization began as a grassroots effort to combat the lack of nursing homes and long-term services and supports for seniors in the Chinatown and North Beach neighborhoods of San Francisco. On Lok developed a new model of comprehensive health and social care that enables seniors to live independently, as an alternative to a nursing home or assisted living facility. The model was subsequently replicated across the United States and formally established as the Program of All-Inclusive Care for the Elderly (PACE).

Today, On Lok operates nine PACE centers across the Bay Area, plus a senior center, an adult day program, and senior housing in San Francisco.
