= Spinal Cord Independence Measure =

Outcome measure for spinal cord injury

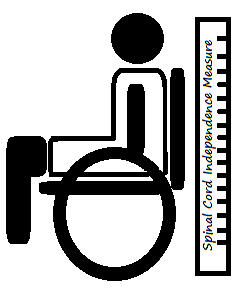
The Spinal Cord Independence Measure is used to assess functional independence after spinal cord injury.

The Spinal Cord Independence Measure (SCIM) is an outcome measure used in rehabilitation medicine to evaluate functional independence in individuals with spinal cord injury. Outcome measures are widely used to assess the severity of disability and to monitor changes in patient functioning over time. Such measures support clinical decision-making, research comparisons of rehabilitation interventions, and health policy evaluations.

The SCIM was developed specifically for individuals with spinal cord injury and assesses an individual's ability to perform basic activities of daily living safely and independently.

== Structure and psychometric properties ==
The SCIM consists of 19 items divided into three subscales: self care, respiration and sphincter management, and mobility. These domains capture functional abilities that are particularly relevant for individuals living with spinal cord lesions.

=== Psychometric properties ===
The most recent version of the instrument, SCIM III, has been evaluated in multiple multicenter trials and has demonstrated acceptable validity and reliability.

SCIM III has also been translated and culturally adapted into several languages, including Italian, Spanish, Greek, Portuguese, Thai, Turkish and Persian languages. Systematic reviews have suggested that SCIM III has acceptable psychometric performance for measuring functional outcomes in individuals with spinal cord injury.
