= Bristol Activities of Daily Living Scale =

- Synonyms: BADLS
- Purpose: ability of daily living activity(those with dementia)

The Bristol Activities of Daily Living Scale (BADLS) is a 20-item questionnaire designed to measure the ability of someone with dementia to carry out daily activities such as dressing, preparing food and using transport.
