= Schwab and England ADL scale =

Gauge of disability

- Purpose: assessing the capabilities of people with impaired mobility

The Schwab and England ADL (Activities of Daily Living) scale is a method of assessing the capabilities of people with impaired mobility. The scale uses percentages to represent how much effort and dependence on others people need to complete daily chores. The rating may be given by a professional or by the person being tested.

The scale was first presented in 1968 at Third Symposium on Parkinson's Disease, Royal College of Surgeons in Edinburgh, by co-authors R.S. Schwab and A.C. England.

== The scale ==
Percentage of independence	Description	Awareness of difficulties
100%; Completely independent	Able to do all chores without slowness, difficulty or impairment.	Unaware
90%; Completely independent	Able to do all chores, but with some degree of slowness, difficulty and/or impairment. One might take two times longer than normal to complete chores.	Somewhat aware
80%; Usually completely independent	Takes two times longer than normal to complete chores.	Aware
70%; Mostly independent	Faces more difficulty with some chores. One spends a large part of the day with chores and might take three to four times longer than normal.	Aware
60%; Somewhat independent	Can do most chores, but exceedingly slowly and with much effort. Errors are possible during the chores.	Aware
50%; Mostly dependent	Needs help with half of every chore. Everything is difficult to one.	Aware
40%; Very dependent	Can assist with chores, and can complete some alone.	Aware
30%; Very dependent	With help, can start chores. One can also complete few chores with effort and help.	Aware
20%; Very dependent	Can slightly help with chores, but cannot complete any alone.	Aware
10%; Fully dependent	Is helpless and somewhat comatose.	Aware
0%; Fully dependent	Is bedridden and helpless. One is almost completely comatose.	Aware

== See also ==
- Parkinson's disease — a disease with an intensity that varies that can be measured using the scale
- Unified Parkinson's Disease Rating Scale
