= Draw sheet =

Small bed sheet used in nursing

A draw sheet is a small bed sheet placed crosswise over the middle of the bottom sheet of a mattress to cover the area between the person's upper back and thighs, often used by medical professionals to move patients. It can be made of plastic, rubber, or cotton, and is about half the size of a regular sheet. It can be used in place of a mattress pad if a rubber mattress is used. The draw sheet may or may not be tucked into the sides of the bed. When a draw sheet is used to move patients, it is sometimes known as a lift sheet. Nursing manuals recommend that, when a plastic or rubber draw sheet is used, a cotton drawsheet is placed over it. If a folded sheet is used as a draw sheet, the folded edge of the sheet is positioned at the person's upper body. Draw sheets used as lift sheets are generally not tucked in, though sometimes after the move, they are.
