= Civil Rights of Institutionalized Persons Act =

United States federal law

The Civil Rights of Institutionalized Persons Act (CRIPA) of 1980 is a United States federal law intended to protect the rights of people in state or local correctional facilities, nursing homes, mental health facilities, group homes and institutions for people with intellectual and developmental disabilities.

CRIPA is enforced by the Special Litigation Section in the United States Department of Justice Civil Rights Division, which investigates and prosecutes complaints in terms of this legislation. The Special Litigation Section is allowed to investigate state or locally operated institutions in order to ascertain if there is a pattern or a practice of violations of a residents' federal rights. The section is not allowed to investigate private facilities. They are also not allowed to represent individuals or address specific individual cases, but they are able to file lawsuits against facilities as a whole.

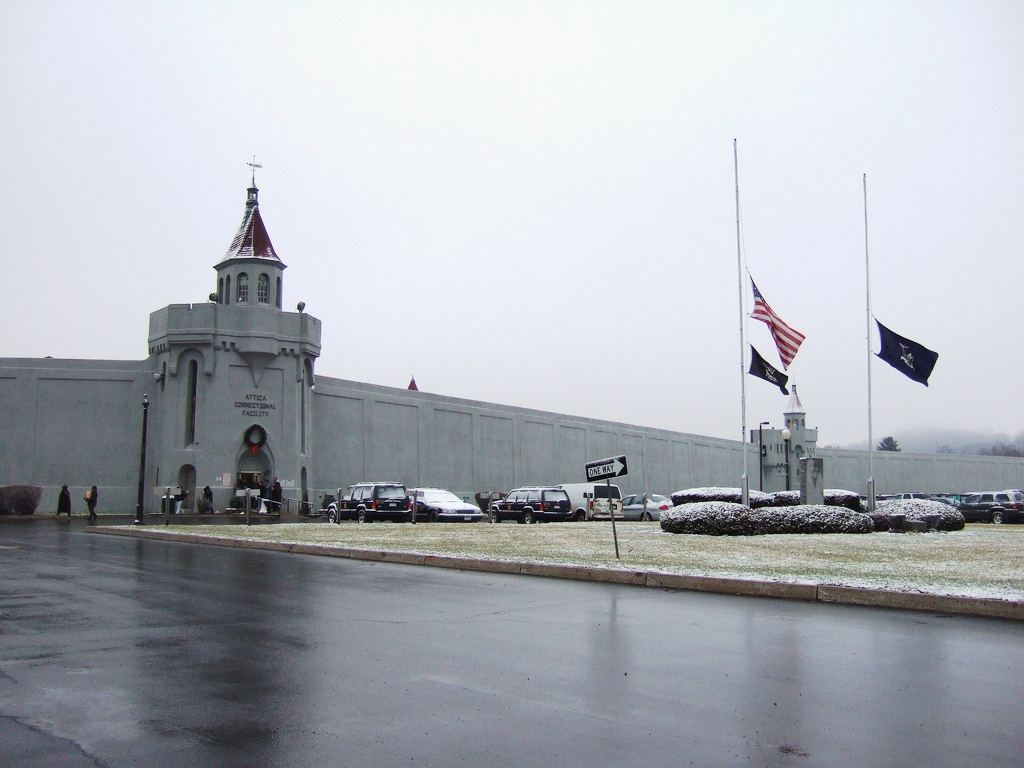
Attica, New York (Picture of Attica Correctional Facility. Run by the State of New York, inhabitants of Attica are ensured their rights under CRIPA.)

== Background ==
The Civil Rights of Institutionalized Persons Act (CRIPA) was enacted into law in 1980, and enabled the Department of Justice to protect the rights of those individuals who were in the care of state institutions. Such institutions include state and locally operated jails and prisons, juvenile correctional facilities, public nursing homes, mental health facilities and institutions for individuals with intellectual disabilities. The law allows for the attorney general to intervene on behalf of institutionalized people whose rights may have been repressed or violated. This law was enacted to give statutory authority to the Department of Justice to protect the civil rights cases of institutionalized people.

CRIPA does not create any new rights; Instead, it allows the attorney general to enforce already established rights of institutionalized persons.

== How a Case is Brought About ==
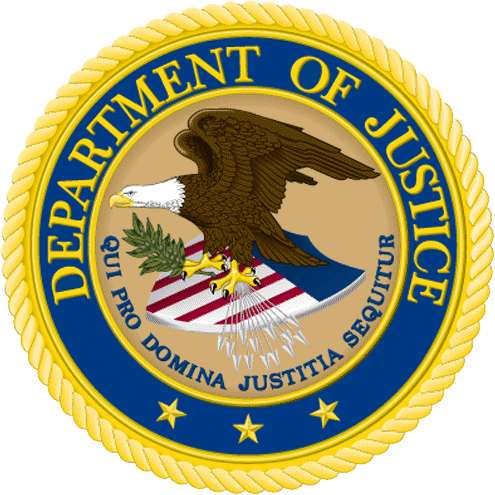
Seal of the United States Department of Justice, the federal agency tasked with CRIPA oversight.

The Department of Justice (DOJ) discovers possible civil rights violations in a number of ways. These reports can range from a number of informal means such as news reports, family members, the prisoners or inhabitants themselves, and from former and current employees of the institution.

After the DOJ has learned of a possible violation, the Civil Rights Division (CRT) of the DOJ must determine if it has the authority to conduct an investigation. Usually, the first question they ask is whether the institution in question is a public institution or not. To qualify as a public institution, there are two requirements that must be satisfied:

1. An institution must be owned, operated or managed by or provides services on behalf of any state or political subdivision of the state.

2. An institution must be one of the five types of facilities described in the statute.

Once a facility is determined to have met the requirements, the CRT reviews all complaints to determine whether the allegations merit a more extensive investigation. The attorney general has delegated the Assistant Attorney General to have the final decision on whether an investigation is warranted. In general, allegations against publicly operated facilities result in an investigation when the Division has received sufficient evidence of potential systemic violations of Federal rights, such as physical abuse, neglect, or lack of adequate medical or mental health care or education.

== Conducting an Investigation ==
Once it has been determined that there is need for an investigation, the attorney general must give the State or municipality at least one weeks notice. Following the notice, the DOJ must contact State or Local government parties and arranges for a tour of the facility or facilities and may ask the parties to produce any number of documents that are deemed relevant to the case.

If, after the investigation, no civil rights violations are uncovered, the DOJ notifies jurisdiction and closes the investigation.

If a pattern of civil violations is uncovered, the Assistant Attorney General sends a "findings letter" that states the alleged violations, explains evidence that was found to support the findings and defines the minimum steps required to correct the violations. The CRT attorneys then meet with State and Local officials to discuss how to rectify violations.

== Settlements and Litigation ==
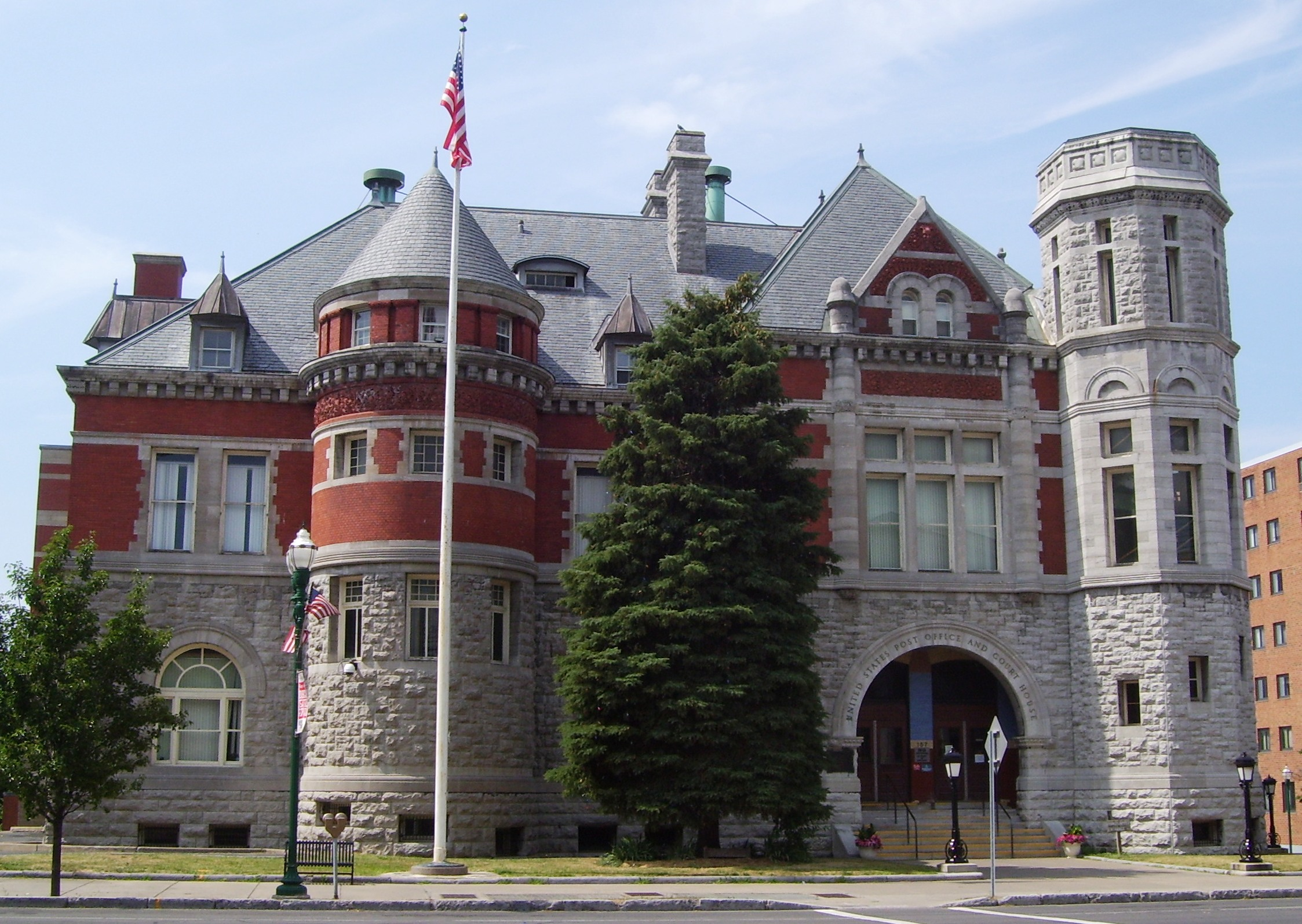
The Old Post Office and Court House in Auburn, New York, serves as the courthouse for the United States District Court representing the Northern District of New York. CRIPA litigations and settlement are resolved in District courthouses when negotiations fail.

When Congress enacted CRIPA, they recognized that although it was not an ideal solution, litigation represented "the single most effective method for redressing systematic deprivations of institutionalized persons' Constitutional and Federal statutory rights." Congress was aware of possible tensions relating to federalism with CRIPA, so they built in a window of negotiations that allow States the ability to avoid undue involvement of the federal judicial system. Congress believed that States should have the opportunity to fix conditions through certain processes voluntarily and informally. Thus, CRIPA strongly emphasizes negotiation and as a result, a majority of all CRIPA cases are settled in one form or another.

As a result, the DOJ must wait 49 days after issuing a findings letter before they can file a suit against an institution. The DOJ, within the 49-day period, must make a good faith effort to work with the facility and ensure that it has had reasonable time to take corrective action. This is to ensure that every effort has been exhausted before filing a complaint. Although Congress' intent was not to wait months or years to file suit, the attorney general has no timetable as to how long they must negotiate with institutions prior to filing suit, other than the 49-day period. Therefore, some investigations and negotiations can last for years.

Many investigations result in court-endorsed agreements called consent decrees. They are either filed with the court in conjunction with a CRIPA complaint, or they can be filed after a CRIPA complaint has been filed and the case has been through numerous steps of litigation. The attorney general must certify that CRIPA's procedural requirements of notification have been met and that a CRIPA action is in the best interest of the public.

CRIPA allows only for equitable relief as a remedy to any violations. These may include the institutions being given an injunction to stop certain practices, being ordered to upgrade facilities or increasing the size of the staff. The attorney general may seek the minimum necessary to ensure the rights of institutionalized people are guaranteed.

== Juvenile Correctional Facilities ==
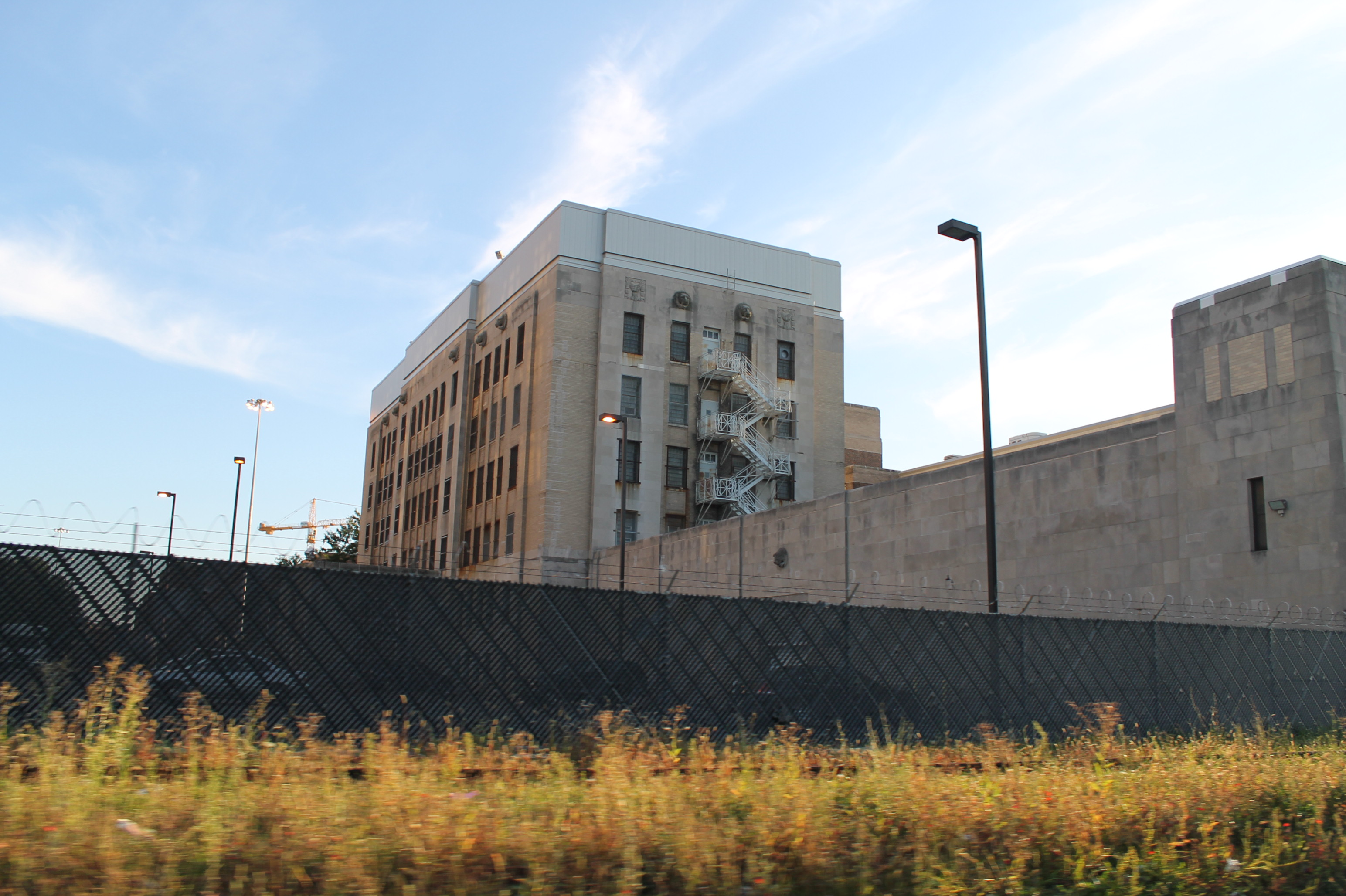
Juvenile Temporary Detention Center in Cook County, Illinois. CRIPA ensures protections for juvenile offenders.

As opposed to state adult institutions, juvenile correctional facilities are subject to more robust federal protections that regulate the treatment of youth, and thus are easier to bring investigations against when the DOJ is notified.

In addition to actions under CRIPA, the attorney general has the power to enforce parts of the Violent Crime Control and Law Enforcement Act of 1994, which allows the attorney general to file lawsuits against administrators of juvenile justice systems who violate the rights of incarcerated juveniles.

Juveniles are guaranteed the right of protection from violent residents and abusive staff members. They are to be provided sanitary living quarters, and they are not to be excessively isolated or unreasonably restrained. Juvenile offenders must also receive proper medical and mental health care. They also have the right to be educated, to have access to legal counsel, and to have family communication, recreation, and exercise.

== CRIPA Investigative Breadth ==
At the start of 2017, there were 26 outstanding CRIPA investigations at some phase of the litigation process. These include 18 in the adult correctional docket, three in the juvenile rights docket, and five in the disabled rights docket. The following examples highlight the extent of litigious reach that CRIPA allows the DOJ in civil rights investigations.

Pennsylvania Department of Corrections

On May 31, 2013, the Department of Justice issued its findings of the Pennsylvania Department of Corrections (PDC), which concluded, "use of long term and extreme forms of solitary confinement on prisoners with serious mental illness at Cresson…, violated their rights under the Eighth Amendment to the Constitution of the United States." The investigation was closed on April 14, 2016, following significant administrative improvements made by the PDC.

This was a rare example of the DOJ bringing a case against the entire corrections system of a state. Generally the vast majority of cases are brought against individual facilities or counties. Also significant was the PDC's compliance with improvements. The enforcement mechanism of the CRIPA Act makes effective change difficult and extensively litigious, a key flaw in applicability.

U.S. versus the Territory of Guam

Another case of significance stems from the United States using the CRIPA Act to investigate jails and prisons within the Territory of Guam. The suit was brought in 1991 to make reforms in "the areas of fire safety, security, sanitation, and the provision of medical, mental, and dental health care." As of January 2015, the Territory has complied with the majority of provisions with a few outstanding issues still to fix. This case highlights the breadth of correction the CRIPA Act covers, as well as the universal applicability to any institutional facilities resting within the U.S. territorial hemisphere.
