= Program of All-Inclusive Care for the Elderly =

Health care program in the United States

Program of All-inclusive Care for the Elderly (PACE) is a comprehensive model of health and social services for adults in the United States aged 55 and over who are sufficiently frail to be categorized as "nursing home eligible" by their state's Medicaid program. PACE plans include all Medicare and Medicaid benefits with the ultimate goal of keeping older adults out of nursing homes and within their communities for as long as possible. Services generally include medical care, nursing, nutrition, therapy (occupational, physical, speech, behavioral, etc.), pharmaceuticals, day health center activities, home care, transportation, minor modifications to the home to accommodate disabilities, and anything else the program determines is medically necessary to maximize a member's health.

== History ==
PACE was originally developed by On Lok, a not-for-profit community-based organization launched in the early 1970s in the Chinatown-North Beach area of San Francisco, California.

1971–1978

On Lok Senior Health Services was created in 1971 to address the long-term care needs of older immigrants in San Francisco's Chinatown-North Beach neighborhood. After its founding, between 1973 and 1975, On Lok expanded to include day centers, in-home care, home-delivered meals, and housing assistance. In 1974, On Lok started being reimbursed by Medicaid for its provision of adult day health services. Later, in 1978, these health services were broadened to include comprehensive medical care for older adults certified to be nursing home-eligible.

1979

The Department of Health and Human Services provided a four-year grant to On Lok to develop a model of care delivery for individuals with long-term care needs.

1986-1987

10 other organizations implemented the care delivery model developed by On Lok, with approval from the federal level. In 1987, the 11 existing sites received funding from the Robert Wood Johnson Foundation, John A. Hartford Foundation, and Retirement Research Foundation.

1990

The care delivery model developed by On Lok became known as "Program of All-Inclusive Care for the Elderly" or PACE. The first replication sites received Medicare and Medicaid waivers.

1994

The National PACE Association (NPA) was formed.

1997

The Balanced Budget Act of 1997 (P.L. 105–33, Section 4801-4804) established PACE as a permanent part of the Medicare program and an option under state Medicaid programs.

2005-2006

The Deficit Reduction Act (DRA) of 2005 authorized a Rural PACE initiative and in 2006, the Centers for Medicare and Medicaid Services (CMS) announced 15 rural PACE grantees.

2015

President Obama signed the PACE Innovation Act into law.

2019

As of 2019, there were 130 PACE organizations in 31 states, serving over 50,000 individuals.

== Eligibility ==
To be eligible for PACE, individuals must be at least 55 years old; be certified to need nursing home-level care by the state; reside near a PACE program; and be able to safely reside in the community with the help of PACE.

== Program description ==
PACE delivers patient-centered, comprehensive care to frail and elderly adults through a collaborative team of providers, including but not limited to physicians, nurses, registered dietitian, physical therapists, and social workers. The goal of the team is to help PACE members to reside in their community independently as long as possible by providing them with tailored services or resources that support their physical wellbeing, mental health, Activities of Daily Living (ADL), and Instrumental Activities of Daily Living (IADL). PACE programs emphasize on prevention and health promotion that can impact members' end-of-life care and prevent more expensive care from skilled nursing facilities.

With funding from CMS, PACE provides all services covered by the Medicare and Medicaid. PACE may also cover services outside the scope of Medicare and Medicaid funding, as long as the providers deem the service necessary. Most PACE participants have comorbidities such as cardiovascular diseases, diabetes, and hypertension. PACE provides services including primary care, home care, labs, medications, recreational therapy, social services, counseling, transportation to care facilities, and more.

PACE programs organize their services in PACE Centers. As of 2021, there are 272 PACE Centers in 30 states, serving around 55,000 participants. PACE Centers serve as comprehensive care centers that include services that would otherwise require accessing primary care offices, social services, rehabilitation centers, recreational facilities, and others. Services such as routine care, exercise programs, dietary monitoring, strength training, and mental health services are provided. The goal is to reduce burnout from caregivers and provide support for the members. The centers are regularly accessible to members; they can participate daily, weekly, or monthly depending on their customized care plan, developed collaboratively between participants, their interdisciplinary care team, and their caregivers.

== Financing ==
PACE receives payment from CMS via risk-adjusted per-member per-month (PMPM) payments, known as capitation. Medicaid covers the monthly premium of long-term care. For PACE participants who are qualified for Medicare but not Medicaid, they are responsible for monthly premium equal to the Medicaid capitation fee and the premium for medications under Medicare Part D. Participants who do not have Medicare or Medicaid are eligible for PACE but are responsible for the full cost of the program.

== Outcomes ==
Several studies point to the numerous benefits that PACE programs have had on their patient populations, including allowing them to live safely within their communities.

Research on effectiveness centers on outcomes of interest tied to PACE programs. These include greater adult day health care use along with decreased numbers of hospitalizations and nursing home admissions. In fact, patients were less likely to be institutionalized when compared to those who waived 1915(c) home- and community-based services.

Similarly, it has been noted that patients remain in contact with primary care longer; have greater survival rates, better health, better functional status, and better quality of life as reflected by increased social interaction; and experience less depression and fewer concerns after enrollment.

One prevalent concern among prospective PACE participants is ending their established relationship with a primary care physician.

== See also ==
- Nursing home
