= Nursing Home Reform Act =

US federal law

The Nursing Home Reform Act, also known as the Federal Nursing Home Reform Act (FNHRA) or the Federal Nursing Home Amendments Act of 1987, is a part of the Omnibus Budget Reconciliation Act of 1987 which gives guidelines to regulate nursing home care in the United States. The act was intended to advance nursing home residents' rights.

== Background ==
A 1986 study organized by the Institute of Medicine found that people in nursing homes were not getting fair or adequate health care or personal treatment. The Institute of Medicine responded to the study by proposing broad and deep reforms in the regulation of nursing homes. These reforms were integrated into the Omnibus Budget Reconciliation Act of 1987 and passed as part of that law.

The Nursing Home Reform Act provides guidelines and minimal standards which nursing homes must meet. It also created a Nursing Home Residents' Bill of Rights.

== Impact ==
A 2004 survey reported a range of improvements attributed to the act. A 2007 study by the Kaiser Family Foundation reviewed outcomes of the act.

== Related Supreme Court case ==
In Health and Hospital Corporation of Marion County v. Talevski, 599 U.S. 166 (2023), the United States Supreme Court held that the provisions of the Nursing Home Reform Act at issue unambiguously created rights enforceable under Section 1983 of the Ku Klux Klan Act (codified at 42 U.S.C. § 1983), and private enforcement under §1983 is compatible with the Nursing Home Reform Act’s remedial scheme. The Supreme Court ruled that a plaintiff can file a federal civil rights claim because of violation of the Nursing Home Reform Act. The Supreme Court case was regarding a man with dementia.
