= Omnibus Budget Reconciliation Act of 1987 =

- Long title: A bill to provide for reconciliation pursuant to section 4 of the concurrent resolution on the budget for the fiscal year 1988.
- Acronyms (colloquial): OBRA-87
- Enacted by: the 100th United States Congress

Citations
- Public law: 100–203
- Statutes at Large: 101 Stat. 1330 thru 101 Stat. 1339

Legislative history
- Introduced in the House as the "Budget Reconciliation Act of 1987" (H.R. 3545) by William H. Gray III (D–PA) on October 26, 1987; Committee consideration by Budget; Passed the House on October 29, 1987 (206–205); Passed the Senate on December 11, 1987 (Voice); Reported by the joint conference committee on December 21, 1987; agreed to by the House on December 21, 1987 (237–181) and by the Senate on December 22, 1987 (61-28); Signed into law by President Ronald Reagan on December 22, 1987

The Omnibus Budget Reconciliation Act of 1987 (or OBRA-87) was a federal law that was enacted by the 100th United States Congress and signed into law by President Ronald Reagan. It includes (among other things) the Nursing Home Reform Act.

== Specifics ==
=== Title I: Agriculture and Related Programs ===
- Subtitle A: Adjustments to Agricultural Commodity Programs
- Subtitle B: Optional Acreage Diversion
- Subtitle C: Farm Program Payments
- Subtitle D: Rural Electrification Administration Programs
- Subtitle E: Miscellaneous

=== Title III: Education Programs ===
- Subtitle A: Guaranteed Student Loan Program Savings
- Subtitle B: Sale of College Facilities and Housing Loans

=== Title IV: Medicare, Medicaid, and Other Health-Related Programs ===
- Subtitle A: Medicare
- Subtitle B: Medicaid
- Subtitle C: Nursing Home Reform
- Subtitle D: Vaccine Compensation
- Subtitle E: Rural Health

=== Title V:Energy and Environment Programs ===
- Subtitle A: Nuclear Waste Amendments
- Subtitle B: Federal Onshore Oil and Gas Leasing Reform Act of 1987
- Subtitle C: Land and Water Conservation Fund and Tongass Timber Supply Fund
- Subtitle D: Reclamation
- Subtitle E: Panama Canal
- Subtitle F: Abandoned Mine Funds in Wyoming
- Subtitle G: Nuclear Regulatory Commission User Fees

== Legislative history ==
The bill was introduced in the House on October 26, 1987. It was passed in the House on October 29, 1987, and passed in the Senate on December 11, 1987. President Reagan signed the bill into public law on December 22, 1987.
