= Henry Viscardi Achievement Awards =

- Awarded for: "To recognize exemplary leaders within the global disability community and their extraordinary societal contributions"
- Country: United States
- Presented by: The Viscardi center
- First award: 2013
- Website: www.viscardiawards.org

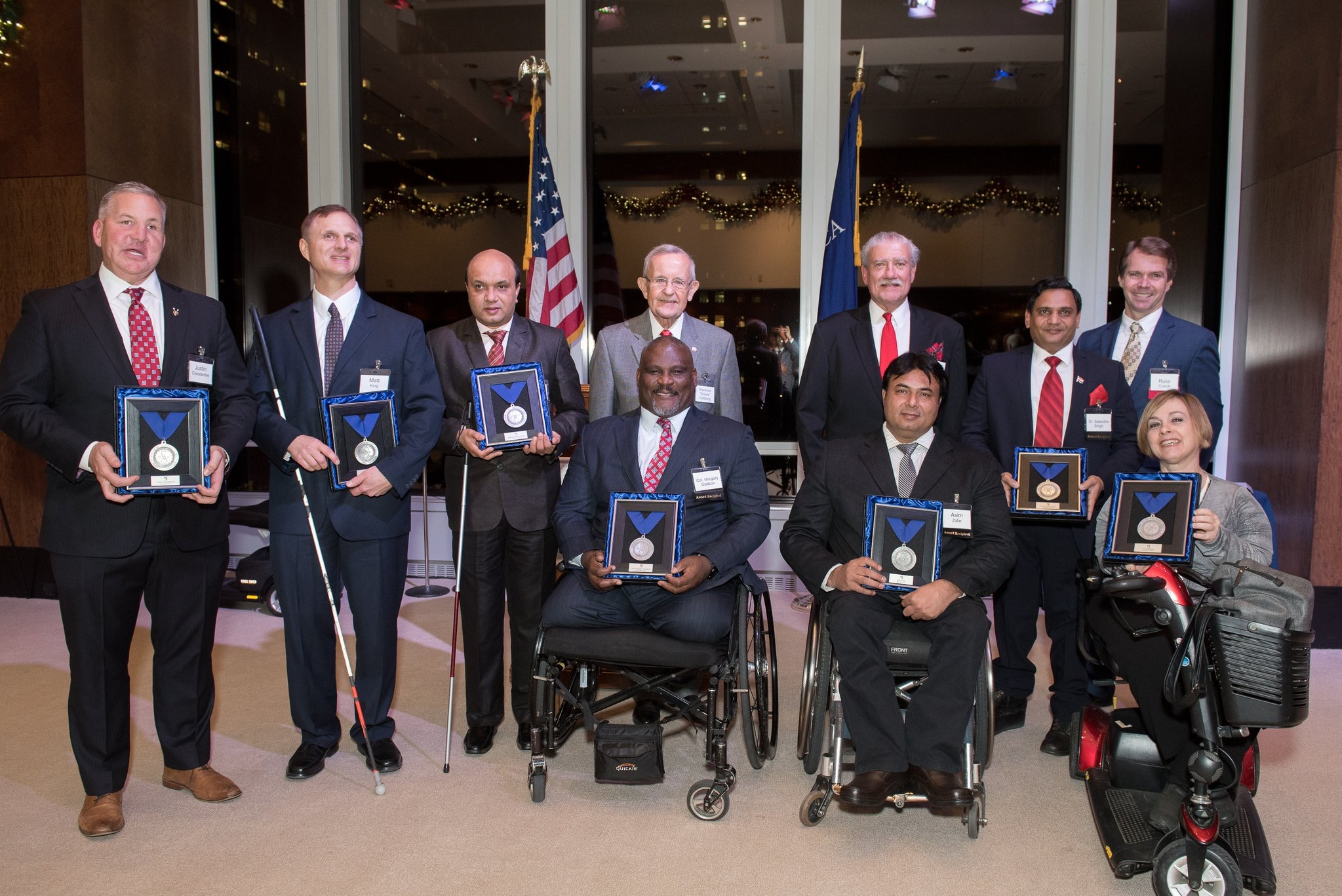
2017 Henry Viscardi Achievement Awardees

The Henry Viscardi Achievement Awards were established to honor the legacy of the founder of the Viscardi Center, Dr. Henry Viscardi, Jr., a leading disability rights advocate who wore prosthetic limbs. These international Awards, first conferred in 2013, recognize exemplary leaders in the disability sector around the globe who have had a profound impact on changing the lives of people with disabilities and championing their rights. Considered as most prestigious, these global awards honor champions of disability activism.

== List of awardees ==
Year	Awardee	Country
2021
2021	Lalit Kumar - Evara Foundation	India
2021	Rebecca Cokley - Ford Foundation	United States
2021	Paul W. Schroeder - American Printing House for the Blind	United States
2021	Dani Bowman - DaniMation Entertainment	United States
2021	Deepak KC - World Bank Group Nepal/National Paralympic Committee of Nepal	Nepal
2021	Miguel Tomasín - Reynols	Argentina
2021	Scott Michael Robertson - ODEP	United States
2020
2020	Nguyen Thi Lan Anh - Action to the Community Development Institute	Vietnam
2020	Caroline Casey (activist) - The Valuable 500	Ireland
2020	James R. “JR” Harding - Florida State University	United States
2020	Judith Heumann - The Heumann Connection	United States
2020	Andrew J. Imparato - Disability Rights California	United States
2020	Braam Jordaan - Convo Communications	South Africa
2020	Jaime Huerta Peralta - Universidad Privada del Norte	Peru
2020	Edmund “EQ” Sylvester - United States Adaptive Golf Alliance	United States
2020	Faʻatino Masunu Utumapu - Nuanua O Le Alofa	Samoa
2020	Duong Thi Van - Hanoi Association of People with Disabilities	Vietnam
2020	James J. Weisman - United Spinal Association	United States
2019
2019	Major Jas Boothe - Final Salute Inc	United States
2019	SFC Joseph Bowser - U.S. Army	United States
2019	Virginia A. Jacko - Miami Lighthouse for the Blind	United States
2019	Kamran Khan - Saaya Association of Persons with Disabilities	Pakistan
2019	Abha Khetarpal - Cross the Hurdles	India
2019	Dinesh Palipana - Gold Coast Health	Australia
2019	Chano Park - Seoul Center for Independent Living	South Korea
2019	Ali Stroker - Tony Award-Winning Actress	United States
2019	Yves Veulliet - IBM	Belgium
2019	Dr. Hoang-Yen Thi Vo - Disability Research and Capacity Development	Vietnam
2018
2018	Maria Town - Mayor’s Office for People with Disabilities, Texas	United States
2018	Alireza Darvishy - Zurich University of Applied Sciences	Switzerland
2018	Ilan Gilon - The Knesset	Israel
2018	Frederick M. Franks, Jr. - Retired Four-Star General of the U.S. Army, Florida	United States
2018	Prudence Mabhena - Prudence Mabhena Music, Zimbabwe	Zimbabwe
2018	Thomas A. Hoffer - Regional Health Command – Pacific, Washington	United States
2018	Bonface Ophiyah Massah, Association of Persons with Albinism in Malawi	Malawi
2018	Jawaid Rais - Disabled Welfare Association, Pakistan	Pakistan
2018	Glen W. White - Delta Air Lines Advisory Board on Disability, Kansas	United States
2018	Mohammed Yousuf - EquallyAble Foundation, Washington	United States
2017
2017	Gregory D. Gadson - U.S. Army Veteran, Patriot Strategies, VA	United States
2017	Dr Satendra Singh – Disability Rights Activist, University College of Medical Sciences, Delhi	India
2017	Justin Constantine- Inspirational speaker, Constantine Group, New York	United States
2017	Yuval Wagner – founder Access Israel	Israel
2017	Hendrietta Bogopane-Zulu- Deputy Minister, Department of Social Development	South Africa
2017	Matt King – Facebook, CA	United States
2017	Vashkar Bhattachearjee – Young Power in Social Action	Bangladesh
2017	Thomas J. Wlodkowski – ComCast, PA	United States
2017	Asim Zafar – Saaya Association	Pakistan
2016
2016	Jim Mayer - U.S. Army/Vietnam Veteran (ret.), Walter Reed Hospital, Washington, DC	United States
2016	Hiroyasu Itoh - Chairman, Japan Abilities, Tokyo	Japan
2016	Dr. Louise Sinden-Carroll - International Federation of Hard of Hearing People, Auckland	New Zealand
2016	Juan Pablo Salazar Salamanca, President, National Council on Disability and Presidential Advisor, Bogotá	Colombia
2016	PJ Edington - IBM Government & Regulatory Affairs Executive, Washington, D.C.	United States
2016	Dave McGill - VP, Reimbursement & Compliance, Ossur, Centerport, NY	United States
2016	Saima Aslam - National Forum of Women with Disabilities	Pakistan
2016	Senarath Attanayake, Uva Provincial Council, Colombo	Sri Lanka
2016	Peggy Chenoweth, Author/Advocate/Blogger, Gainesville, Virginia	United States
2016	Curtis Pride, former Major League Baseball player, MLB’s Ambassador for Disability Inclusion, New York City	United States
2015
2015	Jim Gibbons President & CEO, Goodwill Industries International	United States
2015	Mark Johnson Chair, ADA Legacy Project and Director of Advocacy at Shepherd Center	United States
2015	Mark Wafer President, Megleen, operating as Tim Hortons	Canada
2015	David Krupa CEO, The Range of Motion Project	United States
2015	Ed Lucas – Founder, The Ed Lucas Foundation; Sports Journalist	United States
2015	Winfred G. Mugure – University of Nairobi	Kenya
2015	Toby Olson – Executive Secretary to the Governor’s Committee on Disability Issues and Employment for the State of Washington	United States
2015	Lonnie C. Moore – U.S. Army Warrior Transition Command	United States
2015	Marilyn E. Saviola – Senior Vice President for Advocacy and the Women’s Health Program	United States
2014
2014	Marlee Matlin – Academy Award & Golden Globe Award-winning Actress	United States
2014	Yevgeniy Tetyukhin – Professor at the Petropavlovsk North Kazakhstan State University	Kazakhstan
2014	Jim Abbott – Former MLB Pitcher & Gold Medal Olympian	United States
2014	Maryanne Diamond – General Manager Advocacy and Engagement at Vision Australia	Australia
2014	Marca Bristo – President & CEO of Access Living of Metropolitan Chicago	United States
2014	Ron McCallum – Emeritus Professor at The University of Sydney	Australia
2014	Rory A. Cooper – Distinguished Professor at the University of Pittsburgh	United States
2014	Neil Jacobson – Founder & CEO of Abilicorp	United States
2014	Arlene Mayerson – Attorney at the Disability Rights Education and Defense Fund	United States
2014	Thomas Porter – Volunteer at Walter Reed National Military Medical Center	United States
2014	Susan Sygall – Co-founder & CEO of Mobility International USA (MIUSA)	United States
2014	Mary Verdi-Fletcher – President & Founding Artistic Director of Dancing Wheels	United States
2013
2013	Laurie Ahern – President, Disability Rights International	United States
2013	Tony Coelho – Primary Sponsor of the Americans with Disabilities Act of 1990	United States
2013	Rosangela Berman Bieler – Senior Advisor on Children with Disabilities, UNICEF	United States
2013	Michael Ashley Stein – Executive Director, Harvard Law School Project on Disability	United States
2013	Kathleen Martinez – Assistant Secretary, U.S. Department of Labor	United States
2013	Patrick D. Rummerfield – Community Liaison, International Center for Spinal Cord Injury, Kennedy-Krieger Institute	United States
2013	Yoav Kraiem – Chairman, National Council for Community Relations – Mental Health	United States
2013	Lex Frieden – Director, Independent Living Research Utilization program at TIRR Memorial Hermann	United States
2013	U.S. Rep. James R. Langevin – Rhode Island’s 2nd Congressional District	United States

== See also ==
- List of awards for contributions to society
- Viscardi center
- Henry Viscardi, Jr.
- Henry Viscardi School
- John D. Kemp
