= John Lee Cronin =

American entrepreneur born about 1996

John Cronin
- Born: John Lee Cronin; 1996 (age 29–30)
- Education: Huntington High School
- Occupation: Co-founder of John's Crazy Socks
- Years active: 2016 – present
- Father: Mark X. Cronin
- Website: johnscrazysocks.com

John Lee Cronin is an American entrepreneur and advocate who has Down syndrome. He is the co-founder of John's Crazy Socks, a social enterprise with a mission to spread happiness. Cronin is the first entrepreneur with Down syndrome to win the Ernst & Young Entrepreneur of the Year Award and is also the recipient of the Henry Viscardi Achievement Award. He was named an alternate to the U.S. National Snowshoe Team for the Special Olympics World Games in March 2017.

== Early life and education ==
Cronin was born in 1996 in Queens to Carol and Mark X. Cronin. Cronin has two older brothers, Patrick and James.

Cronin began his education in the pre-school program at ACDS and moved on to the Huntington School system, which he completed in June 2017. During his last three years, Cronin split his days between Huntington High School and Wilson Tech, where he studied office skills and retailing. After school, Cronin participated in the Grand-Friends Club and the Relay for Life events. Wilson Tech also named Cronin their Outstanding Student of the Year.

== John's Crazy Socks ==
In the fall of 2016, Cronin entered his last year of high school. He began looking for work after high school and could not find anything he liked. Instead, he suggested to his father, Mark X. Cronin, that they go into business together. After rejecting John's initial ideas of a "fun store" and a food truck, John suggested they sell socks. The pair opened John's Crazy Socks on December 9, 2016.

They grew the business into what has been called the World's Largest Sock Store. They are known for employing disabled people — more than half their colleagues are disabled — and for their Giving Back Program that donates money to groups like the Special Olympics, the National Down Syndrome Society and the Autism Society of America.

Cronin became "sock buddies" with former President George H. W. Bush and the two exchanged letters and socks. President Bush tweeted out pictures of sock that Cronin had sent him and wore socks he gave him to the funeral of his wife, Barbara Bush.

Cronin has been recognized as the EY Entrepreneur of the Year and the Long Island Chapter of the Entrepreneurs Organization named him Young Entrepreneur of the Year. He was named the Millennial of the Year by the Long Island Business News.

Cronin is a frequent speaker at business events and schools and universities about business. He has delivered two TEDx Talks.

Cronin has been profiled in two documentaries: Sock Guys and Igniting Impact.

== An advocate for people with disabilities ==
John Cronin is a well-known advocate for disabled people. He has testified twice before the U.S Congress and spoken twice at the United Nations. He received the 2022 Henry Viscardi Achievement Award from the Viscardi Center. Cronin serves on the Board of the National Down Syndrome Society and is a member of the CEO Commission for Disability Employment. In 2019, he was awarded the Ernst & Young Entrepreneur of the Year Award in New York and became the first entrepreneur with Down syndrome to win the award.

== Filmography ==
=== Documentary ===
Year	Title	Role
2019	Igniting Impact	Self
2019	Sock Guys	Self

== Personal life ==
John lives with his parents in Huntington, New York.

== Awards ==
- Henry Viscardi Achievement Award from the Viscardi Center
- Ernst & Young Entrepreneur of the Year Award
