= Marilyn Golden =

American disability rights activist (1954–2021)

- Born: March 22, 1954; San Antonio, Texas
- Died: September 21, 2021 (aged 67); Berkeley, California
- Occupations: Disability rights activist Researcher and author

Marilyn Golden (March 22, 1954 – September 21, 2021) was an American disability rights activist, most notably in the area of transportation. For many years she was a policy analyst at the Disability Rights Education and Defense Fund (DREDF). She served on the U.S. Architectural and Transportation Barriers Compliance Board from 1996 until 2005. She had previously worked as the Director of Access California, which was a "resource center on architectural accessibility run by the City of Oakland". She also worked as Co-Coordinator of the Disabled International Support Effort, which aided disability organizations in developing nations. She opposed assisted suicide and fought against assisted suicide legislation in California, Hawaii, and Vermont. She also lobbied for the Americans with Disabilities Act of 1990.

Golden was the daughter of Aaron and Clarice (Lerner) Golden. She grew up in San Antonio, Texas, and was Jewish. While a student at Brandeis University, she had a fall that severely injured her back, and following a long rehabilitation she used a wheelchair. She graduated from Brandeis University in 1977. Her companion was Rabbi David J. Cooper, and she had two stepchildren Talia Cooper and Lev Hirschhorn. In 2015 she was honored by the White House as a transportation "Champion of Change."

== Selected publications ==
- Golden, Marilyn; Kilb, Linda; Mayerson, Arlene B. (1994). Explanation of the contents of the Americans With Disabilities Act of 1990. Disability Rights Education and Defense Fund. OCLC 29879962.
- Mudrick, Nancy R.; Breslin, Mary Lou; Golden, Marilyn; West, Jane; Doctor, Deborah (June 27, 2000). Promises to keep: A decade of federal enforcement of the Americans with Disabilities Act (PDF) (Report). National Council on Disability.
- Golden, Marilyn; Zoanni, Tyler (January 2010). "Killing us softly: the dangers of legalizing assisted suicide". Disability and Health Journal. 3 (1): 16–30. CiteSeerX 10.1.1.695.4344. doi:10.1016/j.dhjo.2009.08.006. PMID 21122765.
- Henderson, Susan; Golden, Marilyn (November 2, 2015). Self-Driving Cars: Mapping Access to a Technology Revolution (PDF) (Report). National Council on Disability.
