= Silvia Quan =

Guatemalan disability rights advocate

- Occupations: Executive; Disability rights activist
- Employers: Colectivo Vida Independiente; Oficina de Procurador de los Derechos Humanos; UN Committee on the Rights of Persons with Disabilities; International Disability Alliance
- Known for: Disability rights activism; collaborating on UNCRPD
- Movement: Disability rights movement, Independent living movement
- Board member of: Disability Rights International; Committee on the Rights of Persons with Disabilities (2011-2016)
- Awards: International Advocate Award

Silvia Quan is a Guatemalan disability rights advocate recognized for her contributions to advancing the rights of persons with disabilities. Quan is president of Colectivo Vida Independiente. She was involved in drafting the UN Convention on the Rights of Persons with Disabilities (CRPD). She was awarded with the International Advocate Award by the U.S. International Council of Disabilities (USICD).

== Career ==
From 2003 to 2013, Quan led the disability rights unit within Guatemala's Procurador de los Derechos Humanos Office. She later worked as a consultant for organizations such as Humanity & Inclusion (formerly Handicap International) and the International Disability Alliance (IDA). Between 2017 and 2019, she was IDA's Senior Human Rights Advisor in Geneva.

Quan served as vice-chairperson of the United Nations Committee on the Rights of Persons with Disabilities (CRPD) from 2015 to 2016. Before this, she was an independent expert on the committee from 2011 to 2016.

== Commentary ==
She has criticized the conditions at Federico Mora National Hospital. She has also advocated for gender equality.
