= Viscardi =

Viscardi is a surname. Notable people with the surname include:

- Chris Viscardi, American screenwriter. See Will McRobb and Chris Viscardi
- Davide Viscardi (born 1990), Italian male short track speed skater
- Giovanni Antonio Viscardi (1645–1713), Swiss Baroque architect
- Henry Viscardi Jr. (1912-2004), American disability rights advocate
- Michael Viscardi (born 1989), American mathematician
- Viscardi Andrade Guimarães (born 1984), Brazilian mixed martial artist

== See also ==
- Henry Viscardi School, special school in the United States
