= Cleburne =

Cleburne may refer to:

== Places ==
- Cleburne, Texas
- Cleburne County, Alabama
- Cleburne County, Arkansas

== People with the surname ==
- Patrick Cleburne (1828–1864), Irish Confederate general

== See also ==
- City of Cleburne v. Cleburne Living Center, Inc.
