= Saviola =

Saviola is a surname. Notable people with the surname include:

- Camille Saviola (1950–2021), Italian-American actress and singer
- Javier Saviola (born 1981), Argentinian footballer
- Marilyn Saviola (1945-2019), American disability rights activist
