= Caroline Casey =

Caroline Casey may refer to:

- Caroline Casey (activist), Irish activist and social entrepreneur
- Caroline Casey (soccer) (born 1994), American goalkeeper

== See also ==
- The Caroline Case
