= John's Crazy Socks =

Social enterprise selling socks

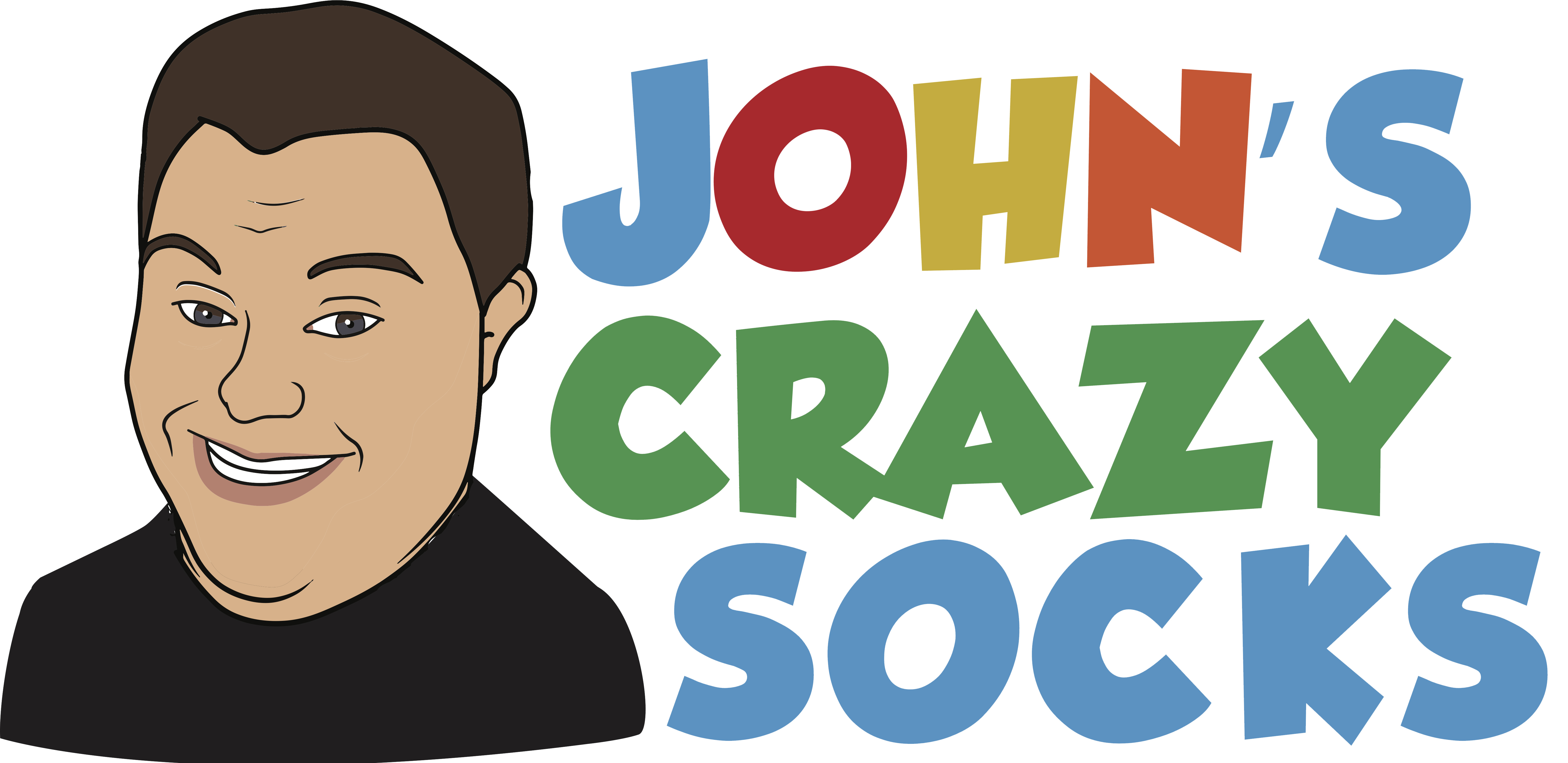
- Founded: December 9, 2016
- Founder: John Lee Cronin; Mark X. Cronin
- Products: Socks
- Website: johnscrazysocks.com

John's Crazy Socks is a New York-based social enterprise selling socks. It was founded by a father-son duo in 2016 and is known for hiring disabled people, donating to charity partners and their customer service.

== History ==
John's Crazy Socks was co-founded by a father-son duo, Mark X. and John Cronin, in Huntington, New York on December 9, 2016. John, who has Down syndrome, suggested to his father that they go into business together; his first suggestion was a fun store, followed by a food truck. Eventually, they settled on an idea of selling colorful and fun socks, which John calls his "crazy socks."

During their first month, John's Crazy Socks delivered 452 orders many by making home deliveries. Within three months, they had grown the business to ship over 10,000 orders and made their first move to Melville. They continue to grow and have shipped over 450,000 orders to 88 different countries out of a new facility in Farmingdale.

With 4,000 different socks,

The company donates five percent of earnings to the Special Olympics, from the sale of their Sock of the Month club, and creating "Awareness Socks" that raise awareness for causes and money for charity partners like the National Down Syndrome Society, the Autism Society of America, and the Williams Syndrome Association, among other groups, under their giving back program.

In March 2018, Former U.S. President George H.W. Bush tweeted a photo of himself wearing a pair of Cronin's Down Syndrome Awareness Superhero Socks on World Down Syndrome Day. He also wore a pair of John's Crazy Socks to the funeral of his wife, Barbara Bush. In 2019, John's Crazy Socks was recognized by Huntington Councilwoman Joan Cergol at a Town Board meeting.

The company is known for the Unity Socks they made urging members of Congress to come together. They introduced those socks at an event with two members of Congress, a Republican and a Democrat. They sent a pair of those socks to every member of Congress.
