= Victor Pineda =

Victor Pineda may refer to:

- Victor Pineda (activist) (born 1978), American scholar and disability rights advocate
- Victor Pineda (soccer) (born 1993), American soccer player
