= White Lightning =

White Lightning may refer to:

== Music ==
- White Lightning (band), an American psychedelic rock band
- "White Lightning" (Def Leppard song), 1992
- "White Lightning" (The Big Bopper song), 1959
- White Lightnin' (duo), fiddler Byard Ray and banjoist Obray Ramsey
- White Lightning (Upchurch song)

== Film ==
- White Lightnin', a 2009 film
- White Lightning (1953 film), a 1953 film directed by Edward Bernds
- White Lightning (1973 film), a 1973 film starring Burt Reynolds

== Other uses ==
- White Lightning (cider), the brand name of a cheap, strong, white cider once sold in the United Kingdom
- White Lightning (car), an electric car
- White Lightning (roller coaster), a wooden roller coaster at Fun Spot America in Kissimmee, Florida, United States
- White Lightning WLAC-1, an American kitplane design
- Allan Donald (born 1966), South African cricketer nicknamed "White Lightning"
- A slang term for moonshine
- The name given to a batch of white LSD tablets produced by Owsley Stanley
