= Eric Rosenthal =

Eric Rosenthal may refer to:

- Eric Rosenthal (activist), American activist, lawyer, and author
- Eric Rosenthal (historian) (1905–1983), South African historian and author
