= Disability in Samoa =

According to data collected in 2006, roughly 2,100 people live with disabilities in Samoa. The country's constitution does not specifically address or protect the rights of persons with disabilities, nor does it prohibit discrimination against them. Samoa, while not currently a signatory to the UN Convention on the Rights of Persons with Disabilities, has expressed an interest in possibly acceding to it in the future.

In response to the needs of persons with disabilities, the Samoan government established a National Disabilities Taskforce. This group is responsible for developing and implementing programmes designed to assist individuals with disabilities. The taskforce operates under the guidelines set by the National Policy and National Plan of Action for Persons with Disabilities, which were instituted in 2009. Furthermore, the leading disability rights advocacy organisation in the country, Nuanua O Le Alofa, was founded in 2001. It served as the host for the 5th Pacific Regional Conference on Disability in 2017.

On the international sports stage, Samoa has been represented in each Summer Paralympics since the 2000 Summer Paralympics, although the country has not yet participated in the Winter Paralympic Games.

== Demographics ==
The main national source of disability statistics is the 2018 Samoa Disability Monograph, based on information collected in the 2016 Population and Housing Census. The study used questions based on the Washington Group approach to identify difficulties with seeing, hearing, walking, remembering, communicating and self-care.

According to the monograph, disability prevalence varied depending on the level of functional difficulty used. The National Policy for Persons with Disabilities reported that approximately 2% of the population experienced a lot of difficulty or were unable to perform certain functions, while the figure increased to 7.1% when people reporting some difficulty were included.

The study also found that disability was more common among older people than younger age groups.

== History and policy ==
Samoa's approach to disability has developed from a welfare-based model towards a framework based on human rights and social inclusion. The National Policy on Disability 2011–2016 was an earlier government framework addressing the rights and participation of people with disabilities.

Samoa ratified the CRPD in 2016. The convention establishes international standards relating to equality, accessibility, education, healthcare, employment and participation in society.

In 2021, the government adopted the National Policy for Persons with Disabilities 2021–2031. The policy identifies priorities including inclusive education, employment, healthcare, assistive devices, accessibility and public awareness.

== Education ==
Education for children with disabilities is provided through mainstream schools and specialist education services. The National Policy for Persons with Disabilities identifies inclusive education as a national priority and calls for improved access to educational facilities, learning materials and specialist assistance.

Organisations involved in disability education include Loto Taumafai Society for People with Disabilities, Aoga Fiamalamalama and SENESE Inclusive Education Support Services.

In its 2026 review of Samoa, the United Nations Committee on the Rights of Persons with Disabilities reported that 19% of children with disabilities aged 5–17 had never attended school. It also raised concerns about school accessibility, teacher training, discrimination and access to higher education.

== Employment ==
People with disabilities experience barriers to employment and economic participation in Samoa. The 2018 disability monograph found that 58% of people with disabilities were not economically active, compared with 17% of people without disabilities.

The government introduced the National Action Plan for Employment of Persons with Disabilities 2021–2031 to address employment participation. The United Nations Committee on the Rights of Persons with Disabilities identified inaccessible workplaces, discrimination and limited vocational training as continuing issues in its 2026 review.

== Healthcare and social protection ==
Healthcare and rehabilitation services for people with disabilities are provided through the national health system and disability-related programmes. The National Policy for Persons with Disabilities identifies access to rehabilitation, assistive devices and health services as areas requiring attention.

The Ministry of Health has established a Mobility Device Service to assist people requiring mobility equipment.

In 2021, Samoa introduced a Disability Benefit Scheme providing monthly financial assistance to eligible registered people with disabilities and their caregivers. The National Provident Fund Amendment Act 2023 provides for the administration of the Disability Benefit Fund.

== Disability organisations ==
Disability organisations contribute to advocacy, education, representation and services in Samoa.

Nuanua o le Alofa (NOLA), established in 2001, is a national disability advocacy organisation. It represents people with different disabilities and works on disability rights, public awareness and government policy. Its affiliated organisations include the Samoa Blind Persons Association, Deaf Association of Samoa and Persons with Physical Disabilities Association Samoa.

Other organisations involved in disability-related services and education include Loto Taumafai Society for People with Disabilities, SENESE Inclusive Education Support Services and Aoga Fiamalamalama.

== Accessibility and discrimination ==
Accessibility remains an issue for people with disabilities in Samoa. Barriers include inaccessible buildings, transportation, public facilities and information. The National Policy for Persons with Disabilities identifies improvements in physical accessibility, communication and public services as policy priorities.

In its 2026 concluding observations, the United Nations Committee on the Rights of Persons with Disabilities recommended stronger legal protections against disability discrimination and improvements to accessibility standards. It also raised concerns about access to sign language interpretation and information in accessible formats.

== Disability and disasters ==
Samoa is exposed to natural hazards, including tropical cyclones, earthquakes and flooding. In its 2026 review, the United Nations Committee recommended greater involvement of people with disabilities in disaster planning and improved access to emergency warnings, evacuation procedures and shelters.

== See also ==
- Samoa
- Human rights in Samoa
- Convention on the Rights of Persons with Disabilities
- Disability rights
- Inclusive education

== See also ==
- Faʻatino Masunu Utumapu
