= Jim Gibbons (businessman) =

American businessman

- Education: BA in industrial engineering
- Occupation: Businessman
- Known for: CEO and president of Goodwill Industries
- Term: 2008–2018

Jim Gibbons is an American nonprofit executive and was the CEO and president of Goodwill Industries from 2008 to 2018.

== Biography ==
Gibbons earned his bachelor of science degree in industrial engineering from Purdue University, and attended the Harvard Graduate School of Business Administration, where he was the first blind person to receive an MBA. Before coming to Goodwill in April 2008, he was CEO for ten years of the National Industries for the Blind. Prior to NIB, Gibbons was the president and CEO of Campus Wide Access Solutions, a subsidiary of AT&T.

Gibbons is a member of the Forbes Nonprofit Council and also serves as a member of the board of directors for the Independent Sector, the National Workforce Solutions Advisory Board and SourceAmerica.

He lives in Indianapolis, Indiana.

== Honors ==
On December 14, 2010, he was named to the newly established White House Council for Community Solutions. In 2015, he won the Henry Viscardi Achievement Awards given to leaders in the disability sector.
