= Arlene B. Mayerson =

American civil rights attorney

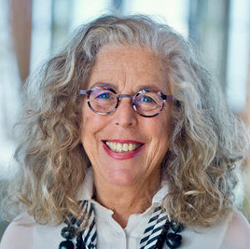
- Born: Cincinnati
- Occupation: Civil rights attorney
- Known for: Americans with Disabilities Act

Arlene B. Mayerson is an American civil rights attorney focused on disability rights. She is the Directing Attorney of Disability Rights Education & Defense Fund (DREDF), a position she has held since 1981. She has provided representation, consultation to counsel, and coordination of amicus briefs on key disability rights cases before all levels of federal court, including the U.S. Supreme Court. She was appointed by the Secretary of the U.S. Department of Education to the Civil Rights Reviewing Authority, responsible for reviewing civil rights decisions of the Department.

Mayerson has been called upon to give testimony to several committees of Congress on both the Individuals with Disabilities Education Act (IDEA) and the Americans with Disabilities Act of 1990 (ADA). Scholar Lennard J. Davis noted Mayerson's contributions as the "brains behind the Americans with Disabilities Act."

== Early life and education ==
Mayerson was born and raised in Cincinnati, Ohio. She attended Boston University, where she received a degree in political science, from 1968 to 1971. She attended the University of California Boalt Hall School of Law, where she graduated Order of the Coif in 1977. As a law student she worked for Judge W. Arthur Garrity, who was overseeing Boston's bussing program to achieve racial desegregation of the city's public school system. From 1977 to 1978 she attended Georgetown University in Washington, D.C., where she obtained her Master of Laws degree and worked as a graduate fellow for the Institute for Public Representation, Georgetown University Law Center.

== Career ==
Mayerson joined the legal staff of the Disability Law Resource Center, of the Berkeley Center for Independent Living, in 1978, the predecessor of the Disability Rights Education and Defense Fund (DREDF). She served as the Directing Attorney with DREDF from 1981 through 2019.

As DREDF's Directing Attorney, Mayerson represented members of Congress, former government officials and the disability community in the U.S. Supreme Court in cases interpreting federal disability rights laws. She served as party co-counsel in the high court consideration of Alexander v. Choate, 569 U.S. (1985) (scope of Section 504). She represented members of Congress in high court amicus filings in Sutton v. United Air Lines, 527 U.S. 471 (ADA definition of disability); Bragdon v. Abbott, 524 U.S. 624 (1998) (ADA definition of disability); and School Bd. of Nassau County v. Arline, 480 U.S. 273 (1987) (scope of Section 504). She represented former U.S. Attorney General Thornburgh in amicus filings in United States v. Georgia, 546 U.S. 151 (2006) (ADA constitutionality) and Tennessee v. Lane, 541 U.S. 509 (2004)(ADA constitutionality). She also represented the disability community in high court amicus filings in Toyota v. Williams, 534 U.S. 184 (2002) (ADA definition of disability); Lane v. Pena, 518 U.S. 187 (1996) (Section 504 coverage of federal government); City of Cleburne v. Cleburne, 473 U.S. 432 (1985) (level of constitutional scrutiny afforded to disability); and Consolidated Rail Corp. v. Darrone, 465 U.S. 624 (1984) (scope of Section 504).

She led litigation that resulted in an opinion finding that Internet only businesses like Netflix are covered by the ADA. National Ass'n of the Deaf v. Netflix, Inc., 869 F.Supp.2d 196 (D. Mass. 2012). This ruling enabled DREDF to attain agreements on captioning with all of the other major streamers, changing a major source of entertainment for millions of deaf and hard of hearing people. Mayerson was also a lead counsel on litigation against Harvard University and the Massachusetts Institute of Technology for failing to caption videos intended for the public. The recent settlements in those cases, after five years of litigation, now set the standard for universities across the nation.

Mayerson brought the first ADA case challenging the failure of preschools to assist children with diabetes in basic diabetes care. The case challenged the idea that licensed personnel were needed to provide basic care, performed at home by parents and siblings. The victory led to litigation challenging the California Department of Education (CDE) and local school districts for failing to provide diabetes care in grades K-12. This litigation led to a settlement with the CDE to ensure that all students in public schools receive the care they need to be safe at school. The settlement established a statewide policy that recognized the preeminence of the ADA and the IDEA over State licensing rules. The policy was challenged by the nurses unions. After years of litigation, the California Supreme Court unanimously upheld the rights of school children with diabetes to receive the care they need at school.

Her work includes the development of special education-related legal remedies to challenge restraint and seclusion in K-12 schools, and to combat the school-to-prison pipeline that disproportionately affects African American boys in public schools.

She also served as plaintiff counsel in Sacramento City Unified School Dist. Bd. of Ed. v. Holland, 14 F.3d 1398 (9th Cir. 1994), cert. denied 512 U.S. 1207 (1994), an early landmark case upholding the rights of children with disabilities to be fully included with their non-disabled peers in school. Other class action cases include Emma C. v. Eastin, Civ. No. 96-4179-TEH (N.D. Cal.) (educational rights); Mark Chambers, et al. v. City and County of San Francisco, Case No. C-06-06346 WHA (N.D. Cal.) (community integration); K.C., et al. v. O'Connell, et al. Case No. 05- CV-04077 MMC (N.D. Cal.) (educational rights).

In addition to her position at DREDF, Mayerson has served as a lecturer in disability law at the University of California, Berkeley, Boalt Hall School of Law (now Berkeley Law) since 1987. She also taught at Stanford, Golden Gate, Santa Clara, and Davis law schools. In 1995, she was appointed by the Secretary of the U.S. Department of Education, Secretary Riley, to the Civil Rights Reviewing Authority, responsible for reviewing all civil rights decisions of the Department of Education, and she served in that capacity for two three year terms.

== Publications ==
- Americans with Disabilities Act Annotated-Legislative History, Regulations & Commentary – A three-volume treatise which sets forth the legislative history and regulations for each provision of the ADA.
- Disability Rights Law: Roots, Present Challenges, and Future Collaborations – Disability rights and legal aid lawyers must collaborate to fix the damage caused by the US Supreme Court's decisions narrowing the protections and remedies for people with disabilities. Clearinghouse Review, Vol. 41, Nos.5-6, Sept-Oct 2007.
- The History of the ADA, A Movement Perspective 1992

== Awards and recognition ==
- The American Diabetes Association Public Policy Award (1997)
- The John and Elizabeth Boalt Lecturer Award (2013)
- The Henry Viscardi Achievement Award (2014)
- The Starkloff Disability Institute's Open Door Award (2015)
- The American Bar Association Paul G. Hearne Award for Disability Rights (2016)
- National Women's History Project Honoree (2018)

== Supreme Court cases ==
- Alexander v. Choate (1985) – Mayerson served as party co-counsel in this case regarding the scope of Section 504 of the Rehabilitation Act.
- Board of Trustees of Univ. of Alabama v. Garrett (2001) – Mayerson served as party co-counsel.
- School Board of Nassau County v. Arline (1987) – Mayerson represented members of Congress in an amicus brief regarding the scope of Section 504.
- Sutton v. United Air Lines (1999) – Mayerson represented members of Congress in an amicus brief regarding the ADA definition of disability.
- Bragdon v. Abbott (1998) – Mayerson represented members of Congress in an amicus brief regarding the ADA definition of disability.
- United States v. Georgia (2006) – Mayerson represented former U.S. Attorney General Thornburgh in an amicus brief regarding ADA constitutionality.
- Tennessee v. Lane (2004) – Mayerson represented former U.S. Attorney General Thornburgh in an amicus brief regarding ADA constitutionality.
- Toyota v. Williams (2002) – Mayerson represented the disability community in an amicus brief regarding the ADA definition of disability.
- Lane v. Pena (1996) – Mayerson represented the disability community in an amicus brief regarding Section 504 coverage of the federal government.
- City of Cleburne v. Cleburne Living Center (1985) – Mayerson represented the disability community in an amicus brief regarding the level of constitutional scrutiny afforded to disability.
- Consolidated Rail Corp. v. Darrone (1984) – Mayerson represented the disability community in an amicus brief regarding the scope of Section 504
