= Mary Lou Breslin =

American disability rights law and policy advocate and analyst

Mary Lou Breslin (born in 1944) is a disability rights law and policy advocate and analyst. She is an adjunct faculty member at the University of San Francisco in the McLaren School of Business Executive Master of Management and Disability Services Program. She is the co-founder of the Disability Rights Education and Defense Fund (DREDF), a leading national civil rights law and policy center led by individuals with disabilities and parents of children with disabilities. She served as the DREDF's deputy and executive director, and president and chair of board of directors.

Breslin was the driving force behind DREDF's leadership in the enactment of the 1990 Americans with Disabilities Act (ADA), the Fair Housing Act, and the Civil Rights Restoration Act. She currently serves as the senior policy advisor with DREDF, focusing on their healthcare research initiatives.

== Early life ==
Mary Lou Breslin was born in October 1944 and is a well-known figure in the disabled community through her activism and achievements for changing the way people with disabilities live their daily lives. She grew up with a polio-related disability in the 1950-1960s and had to face society's harsh psychological and physical obstacles that came along with her visible physical disability. Through these obstacles, she remained optimistic even through the post war culture that would be reflected in the 1970s onward and wanted to take matters into her own hands. Although she got admitted to various universities, her options were limited because most of the schools would not accommodate her. She ended up attending University of Illinois Urbana-Champaign from 1962 to 1966 and earned her Bachelor of Arts in Sociology because they were more accessible than the rest of her options. Her first jobs included being a psychiatric state worker and working for an employment opportunity program that served the low-income population in Chicago. She was involved in the Vietnam war opposition and the 1968 Democratic Convention. In 1975, she was hired for the Physically Disabled Students Placement Project at UC Berkeley. It was in Berkeley that she began to learn about the few disability-related laws that existed at the time.

== Activism ==
Mary Lou Breslin has been an advocate for disability rights law and policy for about 40 years. Breslin co-founded the Disability Rights Education and Defense Fund (DREDF), a national disability rights law and policy center established in 1979. Breslin played a crucial role in the creation of groundbreaking legislation – including the 1990 Americans with Disabilities Act and inclusion of accessibility requirements in the 2010 Affordable Care Act.

In the early 2000s, Breslin turned her attention to the reformation of health care for individuals with disabilities. She wanted to shift the viewpoints circulating in the healthcare industry and find ways that could better accommodate patients with physical disabilities, for example a height-adjustable exam table, to ensure there was no discrimination based on disability. There is often a lack of disability awareness among MCO's and providers regarding physical and programmatic accommodations; advocates and federal policy makers are finding new pathways to improve access and raise disability cultural awareness through means of provider education and new training requirements

Mary Lou Breslin also worked with feminist policies and creating a more inclusive space. She has committed herself towards the fight for justice and advancing the social progress for women, disabled people, and disabled women.

== Career ==
Mary Lou Breslin served as a researcher, trainer, and policy consultant in addition to lecturing on disability and related civil rights topics. Earlier in her career, Breslin taught graduate courses at the University of San Francisco and was an editor and researcher for Disability Rights and the Independent Living Project stemming in Berkeley, California. Besides work in the US, Breslin has provided consultations for disability rights leaders in Russia and Japan.

== Trainings and DREDF ==
In 1978, Breslin began running trainings about Section 504 of the Rehabilitation Act, a law which prohibits discrimination against people with disabilities in federally funded programs. In 1979, the DREDF separated from the Center for Independent Living. In 1980, Breslin assisted in creating a Washington office for the DREDF (which was previously located only in Berkeley). They were able to meet with members of the United States congress and discuss issues regarding Section 504. In addition, they formed alliances with disability organizations across the United States. In 1993, Breslin founded the DREDF Development Partnership, which supports and secures DREDF's programs.

== Research ==
During her career as a policy consultant, researcher, and trainer, Breslin taught graduate courses at the University of San Francisco Masugang Graduate School of Management. In 1996–2004, she served as editor and researcher with the Disability Rights and Independent Living Project of the Regional Oral History Office of the Bancroft Library, UC Berkeley. Her research has consisted mainly of written publications on various disability topics, specifically healthcare throughout the more recent years. In 2004, she became focused on health inequality for individuals with disabilities after a friend who used a wheelchair died from cancer after suffering from inadequate care, medical equipment, and lack of disability awareness from her medical provider. Since then, Breslin has successfully pushed for changes in policy and standards at the state and federal level. She has worked with selected Medicaid managed care organizations to develop model disability policies in California, and in Washington her research was vital for the inclusion of accessibility requirements in the 2010 Affordable Care Act.

== Awards and recognition ==
Mary Lou Breslin received the Eunice Kennedy Shriver Award from the University of California, San Francisco in 2015 which acknowledged DREDF's advocacy on behalf of people with developmental disabilities. Earlier in her career she received a Mary E. Switzer Merit Fellowship in 1995. The Physical and Mental Disability Rights Committee of the American Bar Association awarded her and DREDF the Paul A. Hearne Award in 2000 and the community leadership award from the San Francisco foundation in 2009 for improving the lives of people with disabilities. In 2013, Breslin was named a Fellow by Encore.org.

== See also ==
- Disability Rights Education and Defense Fund
- Disability Rights Movement
