= American Association of People with Disabilities =

Non-profit organization

- Abbreviation: AAPD
- Formation: July 25, 1995; 31 years ago
- Legal status: 501(c)(3) nonprofit organization
- Headquarters: Washington, D.C., U.S.
- Website: www.aapd.com

The American Association of People with Disabilities (AAPD) is an American non-profit organization which advocates for the legal rights of people with disabilities, based in Washington, D.C.

The mission of AAPD is to increase the political and economic power of people with disabilities. As a national disability-led and cross-disability rights organization, AAPD advocates for full civil rights for over 60 million Americans with disabilities. AAPD promotes equal opportunity, economic power, independent living, and political participation for people with disabilities.

One of the primary goals of AAPD is to further the implementation of the provisions of the Americans with Disabilities Act.

== History ==
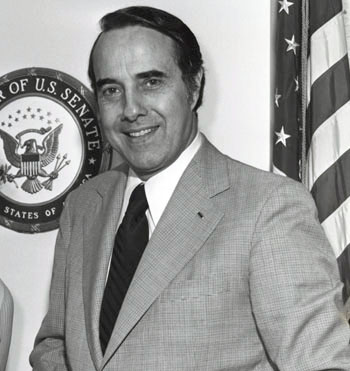
Senator Bob Dole, one of the founders of AAPD.

AAPD was founded on July 25, 1995, by Paul Hearne, Senator Bob Dole, John D. Kemp, Justin Dart, Tony Coelho, Pat Wright, Jim Weisman, Lex Frieden, Sylvia Walker, Paul Marchand, Fred Fay, I. King Jordan, Denise Figueroa, Judi Chamberlin, Bill Demby, Deborah Kaplan, Nancy Bloch, Max Starkloff, Mike Auberger, Neil Jacobson, Ralph Neas, Ron Hartley, and others.

== Activities ==
=== Policy and advocacy ===
AAPD advocates for full civil rights for Americans with disabilities. AAPD has four core policy principles, including community integration, equal opportunity and economic self-sufficiency, equal rights and political participation, and the right to quality, comprehensive, and affordable healthcare. AAPD advocates for people with disabilities on many policy issues, including topics like community integration, COVID-19, education, employment, health, housing, international issues, technology, transportation, and veteran issues.

=== Housing ===
AAPD advocates for those with disabilities to ensure that they have access to safe and affordable housing. It works to assure that the Fair Housing Act, Rehabilitation Act, and the Americans with Disabilities Act are being followed.

=== Civic engagement and voting ===
AAPD's REV UP (Register, Educate, Vote, Use your Power!) campaign works to increase voter registration and turnout among people with disabilities, fight election barriers and voter suppression, and educate voters on issues facing the disability community. AAPD works with the non-partisan VoteRiders organization to spread state-specific information on voter ID requirements.

==== Disability Vote Project ====
Led Jim Dickson, a former Vice President for Organizing and Civic Engagement for AAPD, the Disability Vote Project consisted of 36 national disability-related groups whose goal was to provide equal political participation to those with disabilities. The project's main objectives include election reform, Get-Out-The-Vote campaigns, voter education, and polling site accessibility.

==== Disability Voting Rights Week ====
AAPD hosts Disability Voting Rights Week (DVRW) every year in September. AAPD's DVRW page states that "Disability Voting Rights Week is all about protecting the rights of people with disabilities to participate fully." DVRW activities include hosting a voter registration or education event, sharing materials and resources on voting, and asking local government leaders to issue a proclamation for Disability Voting Rights Week.

Disability Voting Rights Week previously was known as National Disability Voter Registration Week. AAPD held the first National Disability Voter Registration Week (NDVRW) in 2016, prior to the 2016 US Presidential Election.

=== Disability Mentoring Day (DMD) ===
Following a 1999 proclamation from President Bill Clinton, Disability Mentoring Day (DMD) was established to provide mentorship and career advice for people with disabilities. AAPD administers the program as part of National Disability Employment Awareness Month. Every October, Mentoring Day is observed nationwide, with over 10,000 young people with disabilities taking part in activities supported by over 1,500 commercial, charitable, governmental, and educational institutions.

== Opportunities ==
=== Internship Programs ===
Launched in 2002, the AAPD Summer Internship Program places college students, graduate students, law students, and recent graduates with disabilities in paid summer internships with Congressional offices, federal agencies, nonprofit and for-profit organizations within the Washington, DC area. Additionally, interns are matched with a mentor, and participate in a Disability Advocacy Certificate Program.

On March 3, 2023, AAPD announced the launch of the AAPD Fall Internship Program with funding from the Arconic Foundation. The Fall Internship Program runs from October to December. Interns complete remote, paid internships at pre-selected sites. Like the summer program, interns are matched with a mentor and participate in a Disability Advocacy Certificate Program.

Notable alumni of the internship program include Ly Xīnzhèn M. Zhǎngsūn Brown, Ari Ne'eman, Stacey Milbern and Leah Katz-Hernandez.

=== Paul G. Hearne Emerging Leader Awards ===
Named for disability rights activist Paul G. Hearne, who served as director of the National Council on Disability, founded the first legal services office for the disabled, directed Just One Break Inc. from 1979 to 1989, and contributed to the drafting of the historic Americans With Disabilities Act of 1990. The Paul G. Hearne Emerging Leader Award recognizes emerging leaders with disabilities. Recipients receive funding to further a new or existing project or initiative that increases opportunities for people with disabilities. Past recipients include Claudia L Gordon, Lauren Ridloff, Jerry White, Cheri Blauwet, Victor Pineda, Maureen McKinnon-Tucker, Anjali Forber-Pratt, Jason DaSilva, Alice Wong and Ly Xīnzhèn M. Zhǎngsūn Brown.

=== NBCUniversal Tony Coehlo Media Scholarship ===
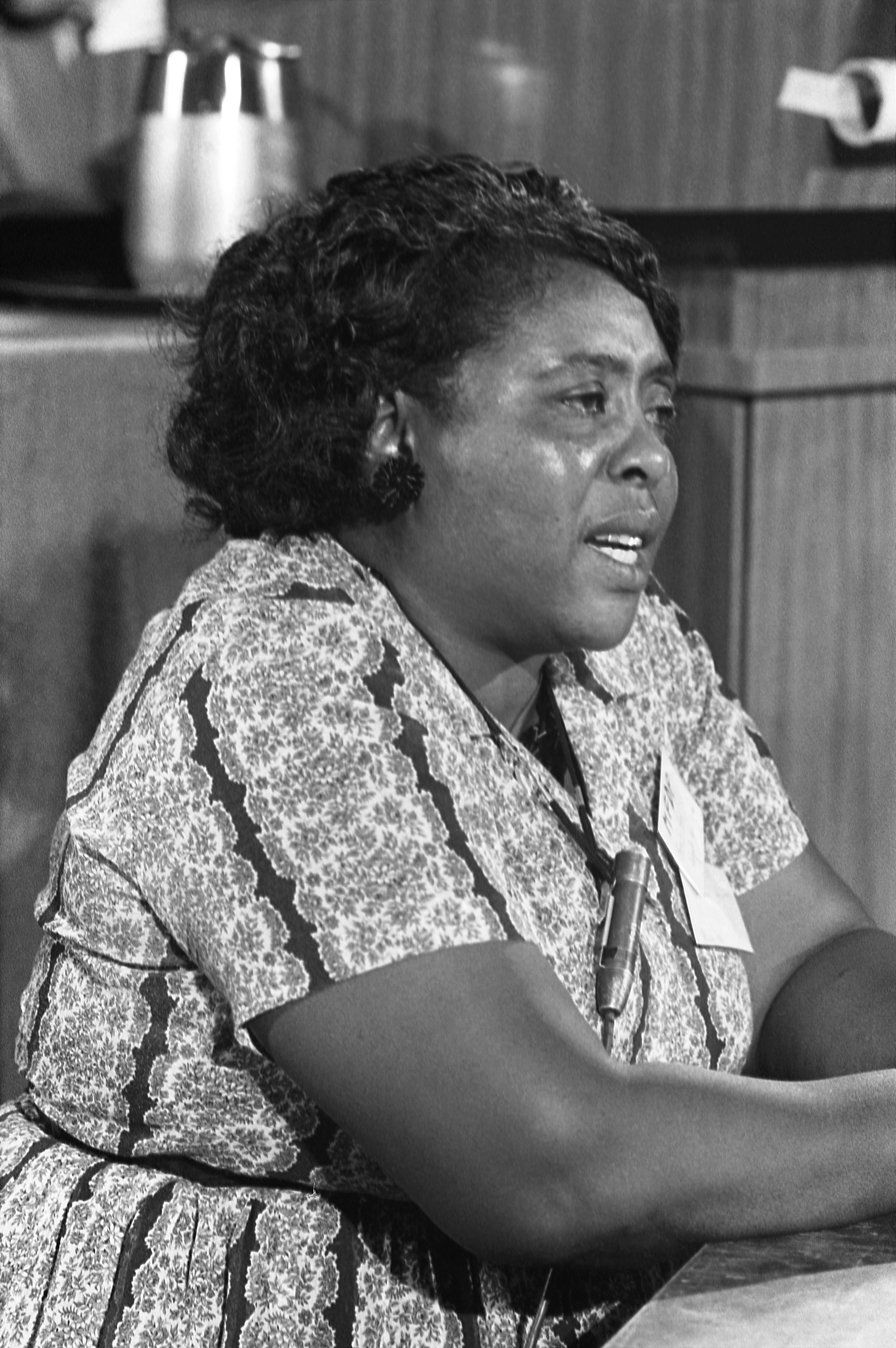
Fannie Lou Hamer, whom the Leadership Program is named after.

Named for former United States Representative and primary sponsor of the Americans with Disabilities Act, Tony Coehlo, this scholarship is funded by NBCUniversal. Eligibility is restricted to students with disabilities who are pursuing careers in media, communications, or entertainment industries.

=== Disability Rights Storytellers Fellowship ===
Managed by Rooted in Rights, the fellowship program provides the opportunity for individuals to combine disability advocacy with digital media storytelling.

=== Fannie Lou Hamer Leadership Program ===
Named for black disabled civil rights and voting rights activist Fannie Lou Hamer who worked as a field secretary for the SNCC, contributed to the creation of welfare programs, and was determined to obtain federal commodities for African Americans. The leadership program provides stipends to young black disabled advocates to create national campaigns that promotes voter registration and participation.
