= Justin Constantine =

United States Marine Corps officer

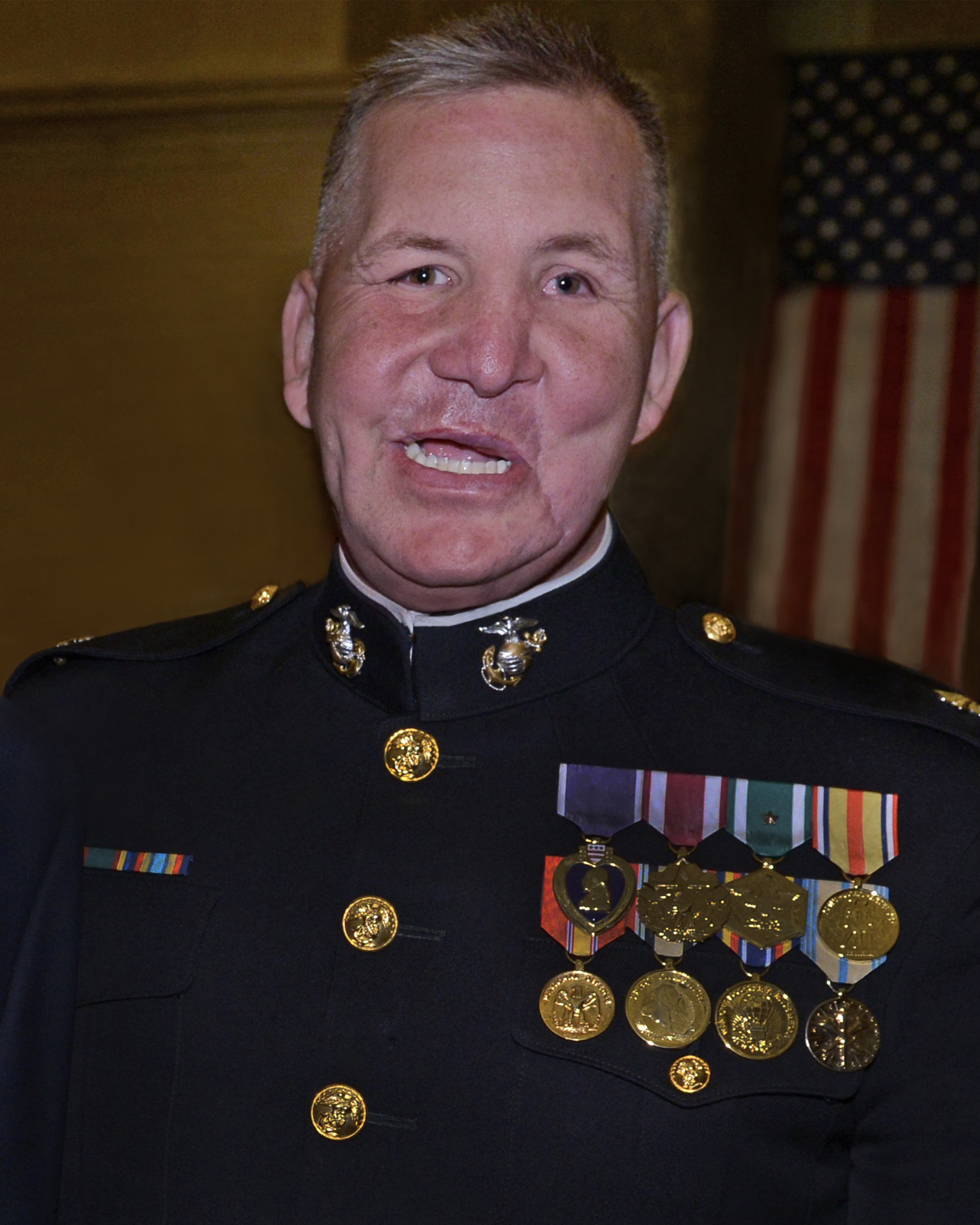
- Constantine in uniform, 2013
- Born: November 22, 1969
- Died: May 2, 2022 (aged 52)
- Education: James Madison University; University of Denver School of Law; Georgetown University Law Center; Marine Corps University
- Military career
- Allegiance: United States
- Branch: United States Marine Corps
- Service years: 1997–2013
- Rank: Lieutenant Colonel
- Conflicts: Iraq War
- Awards: Purple Heart; Meritorius Service Medal; Navy and Marine Corps Commendation Medal; Combat Action Ribbon
- Other work: Inspirational speaker
- Website: www.justinconstantine.com

Justin Constantine (November 22, 1969 – May 5, 2022) was a lieutenant colonel in the United States Marine Corps and an attorney. While deployed to Iraq as a civil affairs officer attached to a Marine infantry battalion for Operation Iraqi Freedom in 2006, he suffered a gunshot wound to the head, from which he recovered. He then went on to be an inspirational speaker and executive at a firm that helps veterans find jobs.

== About ==
The son of a first-generation Romanian immigrant, Constantine grew up between Europe and Fairfax, Virginia. He was a former Marine and attorney who worked as an inspirational speaker and leadership consultant and served as a liaison between the corporate and military communities. He was most recently the chief business development officer at JobPath, a tech firm that helps with veteran recruitment and retention. He served on the board of directors of the Wounded Warrior Project, PsychArmor, the U.S. Veterans Chamber of Commerce, and SemperMax. He also served on the Military Advisory Council for First Data and was a brand ambassador for JDog Junk Removal and USA Cares. In 2015, Constantine co-founded the Veteran Success Resource Group, a military nonprofit aimed at supporting veterans in their transition to the private sector. Constantine was also one of the wounded warriors painted by former president George W. Bush in his book "Portraits of Courage".

== Military career ==
Constantine joined the U.S. Marine Corps in 1997 during his second year of law school at the University of Denver. While on active duty, he served as a Judge Advocate specializing in criminal law and was stationed in Okinawa, Japan, and Camp Pendleton, California. He left active duty in 2004 but volunteered as a reservist for deployment to Iraq in 2006, performing civil affairs work while serving as a team leader in Al-Anbar Province. After recovering from his injury, Constantine stayed in the Marine Corps Reserve until he medically retired in 2013 at the rank of lieutenant colonel.

== Injury ==
On October 18, 2006, Constantine was on a routine patrol in the Al-Anbar Province. He had just stepped out of his Humvee to warn a journalist about a sniper working in the area when the sniper shot his left ear. Assisted by Lieutenant Colonel Todd Desgrosseilliers, Navy Corpsman George Grant performed an emergency tracheotomy on Constantine, and then Corporal Buhler risked his life driving over 70 mph to get Constantine to an aid station. Constantine recovered at the Walter Reed National Military Medical Center with the help of his future wife, Dahlia. As a result of his injuries, Constantine could not see out of his left eye, was missing most of his teeth and the end of his tongue, and could not speak with perfect clarity. He also could not run because doctors removed bones from his legs to use in reconstructing his upper and lower jaws. His first surgery was 19 hours long and he has since had two dozen reconstructive surgeries.

== Post-injury career ==
After recovering from his injuries, Constantine worked with the Department of Justice. From 2009 to 2011, Constantine served as counsel for the Senate Veterans' Affairs Committee. He then served as assistant general counsel for the national security law branch of the Federal Bureau of Investigation from 2011 to 2013. In 2012, he started The Constantine Group, originally focusing on inspirational and motivational speaking. The company now also provides a variety of IT services. In 2014 Justin cofounded the Non Profit Veteran Success Resource Group with Scott Davidson and created the Veteran and Military Spouse Networking and Resource Event called "Bourbiz" which has served thousands of Veterans/Military spouses. In 2015, he gave a lecture entitled "You Are Stronger Than You Think You Are" at TEDxBeaconStreet and published "My Battlefield, Your Office; Leadership Lessons From the Front Lines," a leadership book focusing on mid-level managers in the private sector. In 2018, the Society for Human Resource Management published Justin's second book, "From ‘We Will’ to ‘At Will’: A Handbook for Veteran Hiring, Transitioning, and Thriving in the Workplace."

== Awards ==
Constantine received the George C. Lang Award for Courage from the Wounded Warrior Project in 2011 and the Commitment to Service Award from Give an Hour in 2012. He received the inaugural 2014 Lincoln Award for his outstanding achievement and excellence in providing opportunities and support to his nation's veterans and military families. He has also been named a Champion of Change by the White House, and was presented with the All-American Hero Award at the 2013 All-American Inaugural Ball. In 2012, the Virginia state legislature passed a joint resolution highlighting Constantine's work for veterans. In 2017, he received the Henry Viscardi Achievement Award for shaping attitudes, raising awareness and improving the quality of life for people with disabilities; the Veterans Advantage HeroVet award for significantly contributing to the veteran community though ongoing service and leadership; GI Go Fund's Annual Veteran of the Year Award; and VetHack's Annual Battle of Fallujah Award. In 2018, Justin received the Veteran Owned Business of the Year Award from The American Legion, Department of New Jersey.
