= John D. Kemp =

American disability rights leader (born 1949)

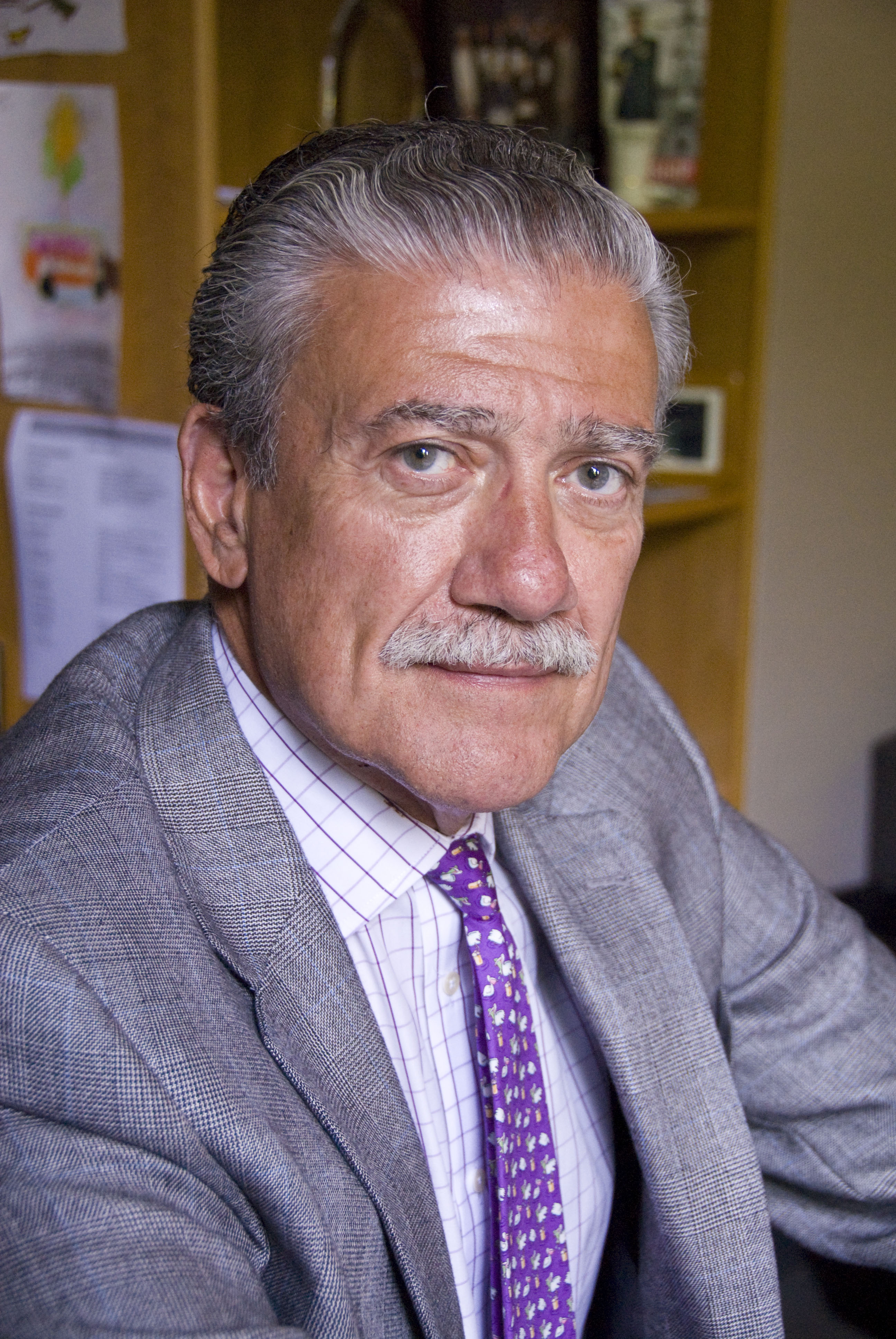
- Kemp in 2011
- Born: 1949 (age 76–77)
- Organization(s): Viscardi Center, Henry Viscardi School

John D. Kemp (born 1949) is an American disability rights leader who co-founded the American Association of People with Disabilities and is currently the president and chief executive of the Lakeshore Foundation in Birmingham, Alabama.

Owing to a congenital anomaly, he was born without arms and legs and uses four prostheses, and he is widely respected for inspiring and empowering people with disabilities. He has occupied several top posts in the leading disability and nonprofit organizations. In 2011, he was hired as president and CEO of the Viscardi Center and the Henry Viscardi School.

== Awards ==
In 1991, he received the Horatio Alger Award from the Horatio Alger Association of Distinguished Americans. In 2006, he received the Henry B. Betts Award, America's top award in disability leadership. In 2014, the Elizabeth Dole Foundation recognized his contribution with the Dole Leadership Prize.

== See also ==
- Viscardi Center
- Henry Viscardi School
- Henry Viscardi Achievement Awards
