= Yuval Wagner =

Israeli Air Force combat pilot

- יובל וגנר
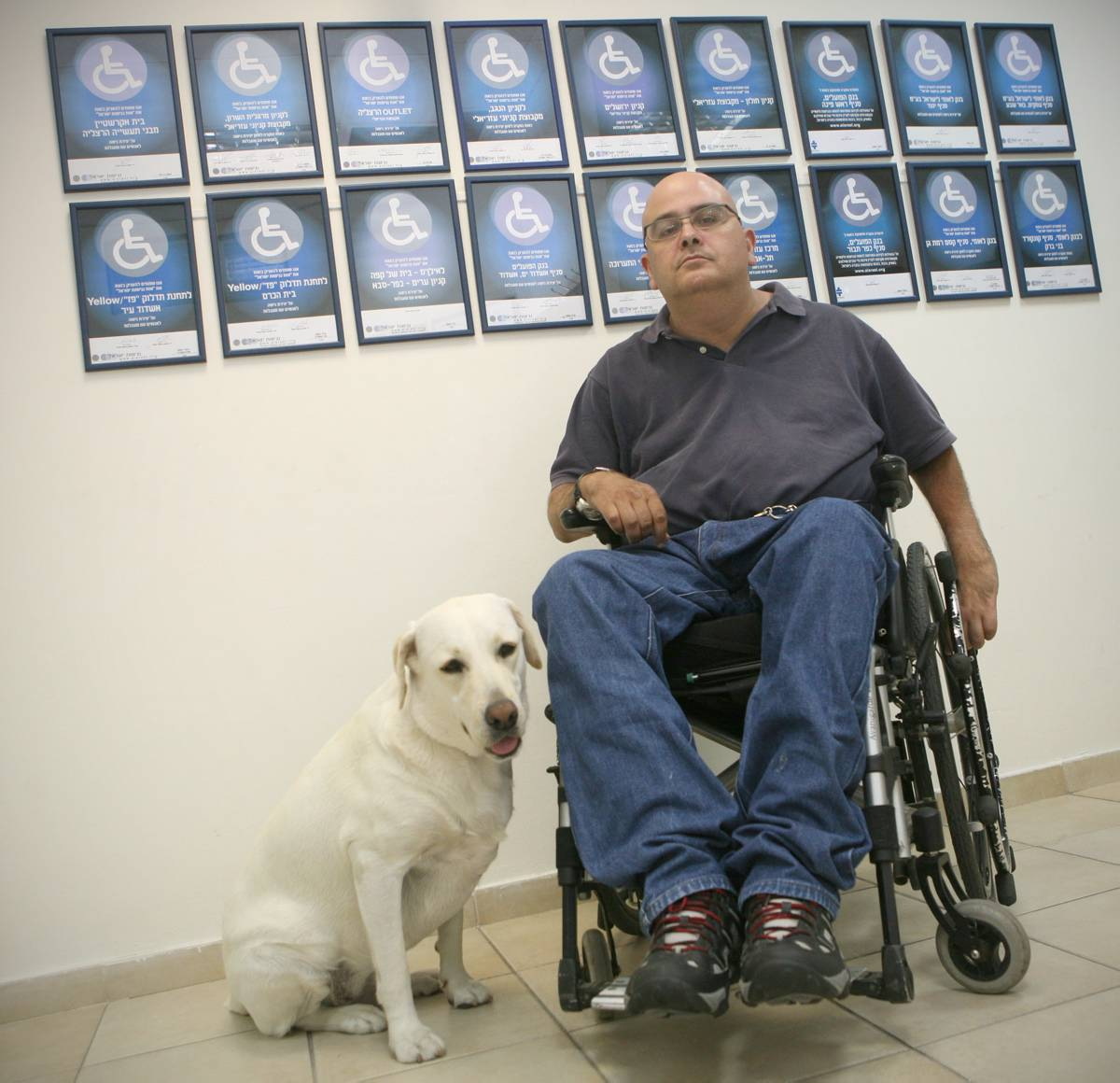
- Wagner in 2009
- Years active: 1999–present
- Organization: Access Israel
- Known for: Disability activism
- Awards: Henry Viscardi Achievement Award

Yuval Wagner (Hebrew: יובל וגנר) is an Israeli Air Force combat pilot who was injured in a helicopter crash in 1987. It left him paralysed and he was reliant on a wheelchair. He realised the lack of accessibility in Israel for people with disabilities, and started Access Israel, a non-profit organization, in 1999. It works for accessibility to people with disabilities.

== Achievements ==
Wagner won the Globes' Social Entrepreneurial Award in 2006, and a Rick Hansen Foundation Difference Maker Award in 2011. He also received the Henry Viscardi Achievement Awards given to leaders in disability sector.
