= Sylvia Walker =

American professor and disability rights activist (1937–2004)

- Born: July 18, 1937; New York City
- Died: February 6, 2004 (aged 66); New York City
- Education: Queens College, B.A in education, early childhood and social science Hunter College, M.S in education of the physically handicapped Teachers College of Columbia University, M.Ed. and Ed.D in amdination and educational of health impaired persons
- Occupations: Professor Emeritus of the School of Education and the Graduate School of Arts and Sciences at Howard University Director of the Center for Disability and Socioeconomic Policy Studies and the Howard University Research & Training Center Vice-Chair of the US President's Committee on the Employment of People with Disabilities under President Clinton
- Known for: Disability-Rights Activist

Sylvia Walker (July 18, 1937 – February 6, 2004) was a disability rights activist and professor with the School of Education at Howard University.

Born in New York City as a blind African American woman, Walker experienced ableism in her early education and worked to combat this discrimination in her professional career. Walker established the Howard University Centre for Disability and Socioeconomic Policy Studies, which is currently known as the Centre for the Study of Handicapped Children and Youth. Walker oversaw the Howard University Research and Training Centre (HURTC), which specialised in preparing low-income, disabled African American students for future employment, while she was at Howard. She also served as the department of psychoeducational studies chairman.

In 1995, Walker cofounded the American Association of People with Disabilities along with Bob Dole and Justin Dart Jr. In that same year, President Bill Clinton appointed Ronald W. Drach and Walker as vice-chairs of the President's Committee on Employment of People with Disabilities after Walker had served on the subcommittee on employee disability concerns, starting in 1987.

== Early life ==
Walker grew up in Far Rockaway, Queens, a then-predominantly white neighbourhood in New York City. Walker was adopted in early infancy and had no connection with her birth mother but described her adoptive mother as her "dominant nurturing influence" in her life. Walker was born with a visual impairment, and her eyesight deteriorated throughout her life and past the age of 14, she was considered legally blind.

Due to her family's low-income status, Walker was unable to buy her first pair of glasses until she was in the fifth grade. Walker cites this as the reason why she was placed in a specialized program for children who experienced difficulties with reading in her early education and high school career. In her second year of high school, Walker's reading skills improved and she was placed in an advanced English class. After high school, she worked multiple factory and office jobs before enrolling in college.

== Education ==
Walker completed her undergraduate degree at Queens College, City University of New York where she obtained a Bachelor of Arts in social science and education with a focus on the study of early childhood. After completing her graduation, she pursued her master's degree in Education of Physically Disabled People from Hunter College in New York. She continued her study at Teachers College, Columbia University, where she received her M.Ed. in supervision and administration and her Ed.D. in the education of disabled and health-impaired people.

She wrote her doctoral dissertation on disability studies in Ghana where she traveled multiple times in the 1970s. She described her research in Ghana as "combining [her] specialization in administration and the education of persons with disabilities with [her] knowledge of comparative and international education". This interest in international education continued when she conducted multiple training programs and research trips throughout South America and Africa.

== Early work ==
After obtaining her doctorate, Walker taught at the University of Cape Coast in Ghana as well as at Hunter College before serving her multiple roles at Howard University. During her time at Howard, Walker won multiple research grants, including a $270,000 grant in support of a "Howard University Model to Prepare Teachers of Minority and Bilingual/Bicultural Handicapped Children", as well as a $500,000 grant in support of a "Howard University Model to Improve Rehabilitation and Services for Minority Persons with Handicapping Conditions".

== Research and advocacy ==
The Howard University Research and Training Center opened in 1988 with a $2.2 million grant from the National Institute on Disability and Rehabilitation Research within the U.S. Department of Education. Under the direction of Walker, the center focused on disabled minorities, as people of color make up a significant percentage of the total disabled population in the United States. Upon analysis of this demographic information, Walker and her team concentrated their research and program development efforts on updating and providing service models for rehabilitation, that specifically address the needs of people of color, particularly black Americans. The HURTC also works to create job training for disabled minorities and conducts employment research in order to inform Congress on policy decisions.

Under Walker, the HURTC worked to identify the contributing factors that led to the disproportionate representation of low-income people of color within the disabled population. Their research showed that in areas with large black, Hispanic, or Native American populations, health and educational resources were lacking. They found that low-income African Americans in particular had less access to adequate healthcare and nutrition, resulting in a higher percentage of babies being born underweight, which can lead to chronic health problems in the long term.

Walker continued to study the intersection of poverty, race, and disability at the center. The center reported that low-income non-white populations were more likely to be employed in more physically demanding and potentially dangerous jobs than white Americans, increasing their risk of becoming physically disabled at some point in life. Unstable or inadequate housing and substance abuse also play an important role in understanding disability issues within low-income populations.

Walker and her team also found that black Americans and other people of color are more likely to be victims of violent crime than white Americans within their lifetimes, which puts them at higher risk for mental and physical health problems. Walker identifies mental health as a key category within disability, and the center conducted research and programs meant to ease the suffering caused by depression and anxiety, especially among black youth. The Center focused particularly on the issue of youth suicide. As a part of the Youth Jobs Corps program, each teenager was administered a psychological evaluation in order to identify early warning signs of suicidal ideation.

The work of Walker and her team at the Howard University Research and Training Center contributed to the drafting and passage of the Americans with Disabilities Act which was signed into law on July 26, 1990, by President George H. W. Bush.

== Personal philosophy ==
Walker's describes the mission statement for the Howard University Research and Training Center as focusing "on the needs of persons who are outside the mainstream in order to give them equal access to opportunity" and "to develop every individual to his or her fullest potential". Walker described the HURTC as viewing itself "as a catalyst for bringing attention to the needs of people with disabilities from diverse racial/ethnic backgrounds". Walker believed that race, income, or disability of any kind could not prevent anyone from receiving resources and care they needed if these services were appropriately tailored to them.

Walker summarized the work of the HURTC in four categories. Firstly, the center focused on the specific needs and statuses of people of color who are disabled. Secondly, the center worked to reduce the barriers people of color face in seeking health care and education and rehabilitation services. Thirdly, Walker stressed the importance of empowerment and community uplift through self-advocacy, career training and employment opportunities. Lastly, the Center worked to train people of color to begin careers in rehabilitation, education or healthcare related services. As a disability rights activist, Walker advocated for people-first language.

=== Race and the disability rights movement ===
Prior to the 1990s, the disability rights movement of the 1960s and 1970s focused around forming a communal disabled identity and finding empowerment through the ideas of the independent living movement. Unlike the federally funded HUTRC, independent living activists rejected the ideas of federal disability policy claiming that it made disabled people dependent on the government and thus made assumptions about their capabilities. They argued that government social programs like Social Security excluded disabled people who were deemed unable to work. Walker identified this same problem in her own work and sought to create programs where people with any kind of disability, regardless of the severity, could be prepared for suitable employment in the field of their choice. Walker's own work with the HURTC reflects some of the goals of the independent living movement which included creating a network of centers for disabled people to learn self-advocacy and determination as well as create a united disabled community with a political voice.

However, unlike the majority white leaders of the independent living movement as well as the Center for Independent Living, Walker centered her research and work on disabled people of color, stressing that race is an important factor when meeting their needs. Race and white supremacy play a role in discussions of disability and disability policy. In the nineteenth and twentieth centuries, scientific racism equated whiteness with physical superiority and fitness and used race, as well as disability, to exclude people of color from public protections. In a congressional debate on the Americans with Disabilities Act of 1990, the racially coded language of welfare recipient was used to argue that the good in the bill came from turning people with disabilities from dependents on the government to productive and employable citizens. The independent living movement failed to include black disability rights activists in their work and their push for a singular disabled identity excluded the particular issues facing disabled people of color.

== Death and legacy ==
Within the disability rights movement, Walker is considered a significant figure, based on her career dedicated to uplifting disabled people of color whose needs had previously gone unaddressed.

In 2000, Walker received the Keeper of the Flame Award from the NAACP in honor of her work with black disabled youth. Walker died on February 6, 2004, in New York City due to health complications.
