= Deborah Kaplan (disability activist) =

American lawyer and activist (born 1950)

- Born: January 17, 1950 (age 76); Cleveland, Ohio, U.S.
- Education: University of California, Santa Cruz; University of California, Berkeley (JD)
- Occupations: Attorney; activist
- Mother: Nadia Kaplan

Deborah Kaplan (born January 17, 1950) is an American disability rights activist and attorney. She is a quadriplegic. She is currently the deputy director of programmatic access at the Office of Disability and Accessibility in San Francisco, California.

== Early life and education ==
Deborah Kaplan was born on January 17, 1950, in Cleveland, Ohio. She is of Russian descent; her mother Nadia Kaplan was a first–generation immigrant. Her family was constantly on the move due to her father's educational and work prospects. From third to seventh grade she lived in Cohasset, Massachusetts but eventually her family moved to Littleton, Colorado where she attended junior high and high school. After high school, Kaplan and her family moved to California in 1967 so she could attend University of California, Santa Cruz and so her father could teach at Stanford University. She graduated from UC Santa Cruz in 1971, and had majored in religious studies.

Kaplan received her teaching credentials and was a substitute teacher at a public school for a while. She then started working as a house cleaner and waitress at downtown Santa Cruz. However, after several months of working these jobs, she decided to go to law school and was back at home with her parents in nearby Los Altos, California. During her stay with her parents, she worked as a secretary for a publishing company.

In May 1972, she went backpacking with her friends in Santa Cruz Mountains. Since it was summer, she and her friends decided to swim in a creek and Kaplan dove into a creek that caused her to break her neck and left her quadriplegic. Kaplan then spent eight to nine months in rehab at the Santa Clara Valley Medical Center. She sent in her law applications and also decided to apply to University of California, Berkeley due to it being the only place that had disabled students program. She did her undergraduate study at UC Santa Cruz and obtained her J.D. degree from UC Berkeley.

== Career ==
In 1974 she co-founded the Disabled Women's Coalition at the University of California, Berkeley, with Susan E. Sygall and in the same year she co-founded the Disability Rights Center with Ralph Nader. She participated in the Section 505 sit-ins in Washington, D.C., in 1977.

From 1980 until 1985 she was an attorney for the Disability Rights Education and Defense Fund (DREDF). In 1997, she became the executive director of the World Institute on Disability. She served in that role until 2005.

She has also worked with the Center for Independent Living, the Disability Law Resource Center, and the Disabled Women's Support Group.

In addition, Kaplan led the Accessible Technology Initiative for the California State University System. She also served as the Section 508 Policy Lead and Agency-wide Section 508 Coordinator in the Office of the Chief Information Officer at the U.S. Department of Health and Human Services.

In 2020, she joined the San Francisco Mayor's Office on Disability (now known as the Office on Disability and Accessibility). In her role, she has pushed for more accessible city websites for all residents, better used disability data, and helped open the nation's first Disability Cultural Center in San Francisco.
