= Abha Khetarpal =

Indian disability rights activist

Abha Khetarpal (born 10 June 1968) is an Indian disability rights activist and counsellor based in New Delhi, India. She is the founder of Cross The Hurdles – a counselling/educational resource website and mobile application designed for people with disabilities.

She has won a 2016 National Award for empowerment of persons with disabilities: Best Role Model. She is also the recipient of the Henry Viscardi Achievement Awards, 2019 and 100 Women Achievers Award, 2019 by the Ministry of Women and Child Development, India.

Abha was one of the four protagonists in the documentary Accsex. She has authored Disabled Lives Matter, Warrior on Wheels and several other books and research publications.

== Personal life ==
Abha Khetarpal was born in Ambala, Haryana to parents who were migrants from Burma. Both her parents were teachers. Khetarpal contracted polio at the age of three. She has been using assistive technology like leg braces, spinal braces, and a wheelchair for mobility. Khetarpal went through therapies, reconstructive surgeries, and procedures including hip correction and procedures to improve scoliosis. After attending four years of regular school, she faced inaccessibility and continued her higher studies through distance education.

Khetarpal started writing poetry in Hindi at the age of 18.

== Education ==
Khetarpal was home-schooled by both her parents, who were teachers, up until 9th grade. She was able to join a regular school that made arrangements for the classroom to be shifted to the ground floor so that she could attend the classes.

== Career ==
In 2010, Khetarpal founded Cross The Hurdles, a non-profit working in counselling and resource building for people living with disabilities. Her disability rights work involves counselling people with disabilities for better employment opportunities, sexual health, and confidence building. She also advocates for people with disabilities in India, critiquing the government schemes and policies, and mainstreaming disability in the sustainable development goals implementation. She also highlighted how people with disabilities faced additional challenges during COVID including the difficulty of finding home nurses.

In 2016, when the Department of Empowerment of Persons with Disabilities under the Ministry of Social Justice and Empowerment was named Divyangjan Khetarpal publicly critiqued the use of the word divyangjan, highlighting how it is disrespectful and othering to people living with disabilities. She has also spoken about the negative portrayal of women living with disabilities in cinema and media, and how it desexualizes them. Khetarpal has called attention to the lack of representation and misrepresentations of people with disabilities in media and the lack of adequate coverage of the different types of violence that women with disabilities face.

Khetarpal is also a sexuality trainer. She has addressed the gap in sexuality education for people with disabilities by developing and offering a self-paced course on Cross the Hurdles. She has authored several books and publications on menstrual management and hygiene as well as Sexual and Reproductive Health and Rights of Women with Disabilities in India.

Khetarpal has challenged societal stereotyping of people with disabilities as asexual and as victims, in need of over-protection. She conducted a needs assessment survey of 50 disabled women from Delhi showing the neglect of their sexual and reproductive health. Along with providing counselling on sexuality, Khetarpal also advocates for the sexual and reproductive rights of women with disabilities.

== Publications ==
Khetarpal has authored several articles for the America Times, Feminism In India.

- Warrior on Wheels, 2022: A book co-authored by Khetarpal with Rachana Jogar Pahadiwala for the National Book Trust India. The book covers the life of Dr. Kanubhai Hansmukhbhai Tailor, a disability rights activist.
- Manual on Sexual and Reproductive Health and Rights of Women with Disabilities, 2020 A project supported by Women's Asia Fund
- Disabled Lives Matter, (year unknown) An anthology of articles written by Khetarpal over a period of 10 years, including her articles written for various platforms and publications including Feminism in India, Youth Ki Awaaz, Medium, Point of View, and SexDis.
- Going With The Flow, 2016 A handbook on menstrual management and hygiene for women with disabilities. The book is available both in Hindi and English.
- Keeping you Abreast: A Handbook on Breast Cancer Self Examination for Women with Disabilities, 2013
- Tax Concessions and Exemptions for Persons with Disabilities in India, 2012

== Awards ==
- 2016 National Award for empowerment of persons with disabilities: Best Role Model
- 100 Women Achievers Award, 2019 By Ministry of Women and Child Development
- Henry Viscardi Achievement Awards, 2019 - These international Awards, first conferred in 2013, recognize exemplary leaders in the disability sector around the globe who have had a profound impact on changing the lives of people with disabilities and championing their rights.
- D-30 Disability Impact List 2020 Honoree
- FemiList100 2021: a curated list of 100 women from the Global South, working in the fields of foreign policy, peacebuilding, law, activism, and development.

== Media and popular culture ==
In 2013, Khetarpal was featured in the documentary "Accsex" directed by Shweta Ghosh which explores themes of sexuality and desire through the experiences of four women with disabilities. In her interview for the film, she narrates growing up with disability in a conservative society where sex and sexuality conversation was a taboo, also powerfully relating her experience with healthcare, of being treated a "human body, not a human being" and debunking essential myths about how disabled women desire and express said desire.
