= Susan E. Sygall =

American disability rights activist

Susan E. Sygall is an American disability rights advocate and civil rights leader. She is the CEO of Mobility International USA (MIUSA), which she co-founded in 1981.

== Biography ==
Sygall has been a wheelchair rider since the age of 18. She attended the University of California, Berkeley. In 1974 she co-founded the Disabled Women's Coalition at the University of California, Berkeley, with Deborah Kaplan. During her time at Berkeley she also founded a recreational sports program for students with disabilities. In 1975 she spent a year as an exchange student at the University of Queensland in Australia through a goodwill ambassador program of the Rotary Club. She received her B.S. degree in 1976 and earned her M.S. in therapeutic recreation from the University of Oregon in 1981.

Sygall's experiences traveling abroad led her to co-found the 501(c)(3) non-profit organization Mobility International USA with Barbara Williams in 1981. MIUSA received funding from the United States Information Agency in 1995 to start the National Clearinghouse on Disability and Exchange. The organization runs an exchange program and promotes the inclusion of people with disabilities in international volunteer exchanges.

Sygall won the prestigious Henry Viscardi Achievement Awards in 2014 for her work in the disability sector. She was the recipient of a MacArthur Foundation Fellowship in 2000. She was named an Ashoka Fellow in 2013. She has served as an editor for Transitions Abroad.
