= Sandra Schnur =

- Born: July 30, 1935
- Died: February 2, 1994 (58 years old)
- Education: Hunter College; New York University
- Years active: 1960s–1994
- Known for: Disability rights advocacy
- Notable work: "New York With Ease" (1963)
- Movement: Disability Rights
- Spouse: Marvin Wasserman (m. 1983)

Sandra Schnur (July 30, 1935 – February 2, 1994) was a pioneer American disability rights leader and author, working mainly in New York City.

== Early life ==
Schnur was born on July 30, 1935, in New York City to a Jewish family. Schnur contracted polio in 1950 at age 15. The disease rendered her a quadriplegic. She had a long period of rehabilitation, including much time spent in an iron lung. After a period in residence at Warm Springs, she was home schooled to complete her high school education.

In 1952, Schnur was evaluated by the New York Vocational Education program, and was advised to become a basket weaver. Schnur requested instead to be allowed to attend college. The program advisor did not like her refusal to accept his recommendation, and marked her as "uncooperative".

== Career as activist for disabled persons ==
In 1963 Schnur published "New York With Ease", a wheelchair-access guide to the City of New York, published by the Easter Seals Society. She was employed in the Mayor's Office for the Handicapped, under Eunice K. Fiorito.

In 1965 the State of New York agreed to allow Schnur to attend college. She attended Hunter College and New York University, earning a Bachelor's degree and Master's degree in Counseling.

Schnur became Director of the New York City Half-fare Program for the Handicapped. As one of the few disabled administrators in the Department of Transportation at this critical time, she played an important role in providing wheelchair-accessible buses and vans to nonprofit organizations, as well as the introduction of pedestrian ramps/curb cuts and lift-equipped city buses.

In the late 1970s, New York City officials decided that they no longer wished to provide direct personal assistance services for seniors and persons with disabilities, but would oversee contracts with private nonprofit vendors. By this time Schnur had written several position papers with the assistance of Marilyn Saviola on what she called "self-direction," — severely disabled persons with disabilities had the capacity to manage their own personal assistance services, as opposed to the "medical model" where the agency is the employer and the consumer is not in charge of his or her own household. She brought together a group of individuals, which included Marilyn Saviola, Muriel Zgardowski, Vincent Zgardowski, Ira Holland, Ed Litcher, Daniel Ginsburg, and Gertrude Schleier, to demand consumer-directed personal assistance services.

This group protested (with attached ventilators) outside a Board of Estimate hearing. When Schnur was about to be honored as an "outstanding" city employee by Mayor Abraham Beame in a ceremony at Gracie Mansion, home care administrators, hearing of her plan to denounce the pending vendorizing of home care services, told her that it was unnecessary because she had won her point.

Schnur believed that consumers should have even greater independence. She formulated a paper calling for a voucher program, a precursor to the Consumer-Directed Cash and Counseling project that was eventually adopted in several states, which she presented to the administration of Governor Mario Cuomo. In Schnur's voucher program, severely disabled individuals would receive one check, which could be used without restrictions, including management of home care needs, including personal care services. Although the program was adopted by the Governor and passed by the State Legislature, no startup funding was provided.

In 1980, following a series of meetings with consumers and Department of Social Services administrators, this group agreed to create the Client Maintained Plan, the pioneer Consumer Directed Personal Assistance Program, and have it administered by Concepts of Independence, Inc.

During this period, Schnur was a founder of Women with Disabilities United, received appointments to the Mayor's Commission on the Status of Women, and as the only consumer on the Governor's Home Care Council.

=== Concepts of Independence ===
Concepts of Independence is a consumer organization that was co-founded in 1977 by Schnur, Marilyn Saviola, Victoria Holland, Ira Holland and Ed Lichter, formulated to be a Fiscal-Intermediary: to receive Medicaid funds and to pay salaries, taxes, and benefits to personal care workers based upon information provided by the consumer. In addition to saving government/taxpayer money, the client was enabled and authorized to "hire, fire and train a home attendant." Sylvia Friedman, for a while, served as Program Director.

Subsequent to the death of Victoria Holland in 1979 and the adoption of the new Consumer Board of Directors in 1980, Schnur became the President of Concepts of Independence. Schnur served this role until her death from melanoma on February 2, 1994.

== Personal life and legacy ==
Schnur married Marvin Wasserman in 1983.

Schnur was inducted into the New York State Disability Rights Hall of Fame in 2019.

Concepts of Independence awards an annual plaque in memory of Schnur, the Sandra Schnur Emerging Leadership Award.

Schnur's husband also began hosting an annual memorial Seder after her death, to which large groups are invited.

== Works ==
- "New York With Ease" (1963)

== See also ==
- List of people from New York City
- List of disability rights activists
