= Eric Rosenthal (activist) =

American lawyer and activist

Eric Rosenthal is an American lawyer and activist. He is the founder and executive director of Disability Rights International (DRI).

He is the main author of several major reports on international disability rights and has published numerous academic articles on the international human rights of people with disabilities. Rosenthal has also served as a consultant to the World Health Organization (WHO), UNICEF, the United Nations Special Rapporteur on Disability, and the US National Council on Disability. In 2015-2016, Eric Rosenthal served as the Robert F. Drinan Chair in Human Rights at the Georgetown University Law Center. He received an honorary doctor of law from Georgetown in 2016.

== US International Council on Disability ==
Rosenthal is a board member and former Vice-President of the US International Council on Disability (USICD), and he chaired the USICD Committee working for US ratification of the UN Convention on the Rights of Persons with Disabilities (CRPD).

== Background and education ==
Rosenthal has a BA degree with honors from University of Chicago and a J.D. degree cum laude from the Georgetown University Law Center.

== Awards received ==
- Honorary Doctorate of Law from Georgetown University Law Center (2016)
- Father Robert Drinan Chair in International Human Rights Law and visiting professor at Georgetown University Law Center, 2015-2016.
- Phillips Exeter Academy, John Phillips Award, October 2015
- Disability Rights Legal Center, Charles D. Siegal President’s Award, November 2013.

- Charles Bronfman Prize
- Washington Psychiatric Society, Senator Paul and Mrs. Sheila Wellstone Mental Health Visionary Award, November 20, 2009 (accepted award on behalf of DRI).
- Echoing Green Public Service Fellowship
- Thomas J. Dodd Prize in International Justice and Human Rights (accepted on behalf of DRI), 2007
- Ashoka Fellowship
- American Psychiatric Association's Human Rights Award

- University of Chicago Public Service Award
- Ford Foundation Fellowship in International Law
- Humanitarian Award from the Mental Health Association of New York
- Henry B. Betts Award (2008) from the American Association of People with Disabilities
- Association for the Help of Retarded Children, AHRC Humanitarian Award, May 10, 2006.
- Kornfeld Fellowship in Bioethics, November 2000-November 2001.
- Public Interest Law Scholar, Georgetown University Law Center, 1990-1992.
- Raoul Wallenberg Scholarship, Hebrew University of Jerusalem, 1989.
