= Caroline Casey (activist) =

Irish disability activist and management consultant

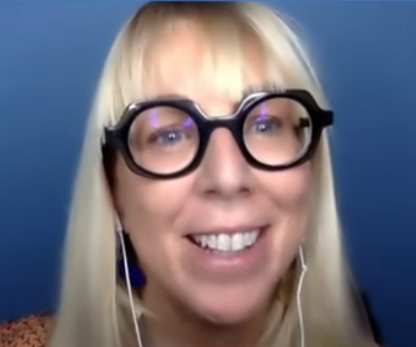
- Speaking at the 2021 World Economic Forum
- Born: 20 October 1971 (age 54)
- Education: University College Dublin
- Occupations: Activist, management consultant

Caroline Casey (born 20 October 1971) is an Irish activist and management consultant. She is legally blind due to ocular albinism. In 2000, aged 28, she left her job in Accenture to launch the Aisling Foundation, with an aim to improve how disability is treated. In 2001, she trekked across India, solo, on elephant back for c.1,000 km, raising €250k for The National Council for the Blind of Ireland and Sightsavers. Casey became the first female mahout from the west. The journey was the subject of a National Geographic documentary Elephant Vision and a TED Talk.

== Background ==
Casey was diagnosed with ocular albinism as a child but was not personally informed until her 17th birthday. She graduated from University College Dublin with BA, DBS and MBS degrees. She worked at a couple of jobs including as a management consultant for Accenture.

== Aisling Foundation/Kanchi ==
The Ability Awards, styled as the O2 Ability Awards for sponsorship reasons, were set up by the foundation in 2005 to recognise organisations that promote disability inclusion. In 2011, the Telefónica Ability Awards were launched in Spain, with further versions planned for other countries in Europe. In 2008 the foundation was renamed in honour of the elephant "Kanchi" used on the Indian expedition.

== The Valuable 500 ==
Casey founded The Valuable 500, an organisation that aims to get disability on the leadership agenda.

== Recognition ==
- Henry Viscardi Achievement Awards 2020
- Rehab Young Person of the Year (joint), 2002 (joint)
- JCI Ten Outstanding Young Persons of the World, 2002
- Ashoka Fellow, 2006
- WEF Young Global Leaders, 2006
- Honorary Doctor of Laws, University College Dublin, 2006
- Eisenhower Scholarship, 2007
- Speaker at:
  - Global Competitiveness Forum, Riyadh
  - Clinton Global Initiative, New York City
  - TEDWomen

== Affiliations ==
- Board member of 98FM
- Board member of Sightsavers
- Former board member of Comhairle/Citizens Information Board (2002-?)
- Former board member of Jack and Jill Children's Foundation
- Former board member of FÁS (2001-?)
- Former board member of Irish Charity Tax Reform Group/Charities Institute Ireland
