= Disability Rights International =

Disability Rights International (DRI), formerly Mental Disability Rights International, is a Washington, DC–based human rights advocacy organization. DRI documents conditions, publishes reports, and promotes international oversight of the rights of persons with disabilities.

DRI was founded in 1993 by attorney Eric Rosenthal and jointly established by the Washington College of Law Center for Human Rights and the Bazelon Center for Mental Health Law. Since 1993, DRI has expanded offices into three countries including Serbia, Mexico, and Ukraine.

== Reports and press coverage ==
Since its founding, DRI has published reports on conditions and experiences of persons with disabilities including:

- Human Rights and Mental Health: Uruguay (1995)
- Human Rights and Mental Health: Hungary (1997)
- Human Rights and Mental Health, Mexico (2000)
- Human Rights of People with Mental Disabilities, Kosovo (2002)
- Human Rights and Mental Health in Peru (2004)
- Behind Closed Doors: Human Rights Abuses in the Psychiatric Facilities, Orphanages and Rehabilitation Centers of Turkey (2005)
- Hidden Suffering: Romania's Segregation and Abuse of Infants and Children with Disabilities (2006)
- Ruined Lives: Segregations from Society in Argentina's Psychiatric Asylums (2007)
- Torment Not Treatment: Serbia's Segregation and Abuse of Children and Adults with Disabilities (2007)
- The Rights of Children with Disabilities in Vietnam: Bringing Vietnam's Laws into compliance with the UN Convention on the Rights of Persons with Disabilities (2009)
- Torture Not Treatment: Electric Shock and Long-Term Restraint in the United States on Children and Adults with Disabilities at the Judge Rotenberg Center (2010)
- Abandoned and Disappeared:Mexico's Segregation and Abuse of Children and Adults with Disabilities (2010)
- Guatemala: Precautionary Measures Petition to the Inter-American Commission on Human Rights (2012)
- The Rights of Persons with Mental Disabilities in the new Mexican Criminal Justice System (2013)
- Left Behind: The Exclusion of Children and Adults with Disabilities from Reform and Rights Protection in the Republic of Georgia (2013)
- Twice Violated: Abuse and Denial of Sexual and Reproductive Rights of Women with Psychosocial Disabilities in Mexico (2015)
- No Justice: Torture, trafficking and segregation in Mexico (2015)
- No Way Home: The Exploitation and Abuse of Children in Ukraine's Orphanages (2015)
- After the Fire: Survivors of Hogar Seguro Virgen de la Asunción at risk (2017)
- Still in Harms Way: International voluntourism, segregation and abuse of children in Guatemala (2018)
- Infanticide and Abuse: Killing and confinement of children with disabilities in Kenya (2018)
- At the Mexico-US Border and Segregated from Society: Children and adults with disabilities subject to arbitrary detention, abuse and early death inside Mexican orphanages and institutions (2019)
- A Dead End for Children - Bulgaria's Group Homes (2019)
- Crimes Against Humanity: Decades of Violence and Abuse in Mexican Institutions for Children and Adults with Disabilities (2020)
- Serbia's Forgotten Children (2021)
- Still at Risk - Death and Disappearance of Survivors of the Fire at Hogar Seguro Virgen de la Asunción (2021)
- Left Behind in the War: Dangers Facing Children with Disabilities in Ukraine's Orphanages (2022)
- Families Find A Way: Children with disabilities in war-torn Ukraine (2023)
- Voices: Women, Children and Disabilities (2025)

In 2026, Disability Rights International submitted a petition for an official UN Inquiry into human rights violations in Mexico's institutions for children with disabilities. As a result, the United Nations released a report of legal findings and recommendations for reform that Mexico must take to meet its obligations under the UN Convention on the Rights of Persons with Disabilities (CRPD).

DRI has an article in UNICEF's 2013 State of the World's Children Report focused on children with disabilities.

On June 27, 2009, MindFreedom International announced that Laurie Ahern had been named president of DRI.

== Strategic Litigation ==
DRI uses international human rights law to protect persons with disabilities and ensure their full inclusion in society.

In 2025, the Inter-American Commission on Human Rights announced a decision against Guatemala in the case of Federico Mora Patients v. Guatemala ordering reparations for children and adults at the facility, demanding Guatemala end detention at the facility and create a national system of community-based care, and striking down Guatemala's guardianship law. This case was brought by Disability Rights International, Colectivo Vida Independiente and The Center for Health and Human Rights, O'Neill Institute of Georgetown University Law.

Prior to this case, DRI won two precautionary measures cases against Guatemala to protect persons with disabilities in the Federico Mora National Hospital and Hogar Seguro Virgen de la Asuncion. DRI took legal action in the Inter-American Commission on Human Rights following the fire at the facility on March 8, 2017 which left 41 dead and 20 injured, most of the victims minors being held at the facility.

== Serbia controversy ==
In November 2007, DRI released a controversial report on conditions in psychiatric institutions in Serbia. DRI's report, which showed pictures of emaciated children and adults tied to beds, called many of the abuses "tantamount to torture". On an NBC News report before the report released, a Serbian official admitted that problems existed. Following the release of the report however, Serbian Prime Minister Vojislav Kostunica described the allegations raised as "malicious". Five days after the report released, members of the European Committee for the Prevention of Torture arrived to assess the problem of abuse in mental institutions in Serbia. Serbian government representatives promised to improve conditions in Serbian institutions.

== Awards ==
Purpose Prize Award (2015)

Laurie Ahern, President of DRI, won the Purpose Prize in 2015 for her pioneering work in global advocacy to protect the rights of children with disabilities from abuse and isolation in institutions. The Purpose Prize, created by Encore.org (now CoGenerate), honors extraordinary individuals who use their life experience and passion to solve tough social problems.

Phillips Exeter Academy John Phillips Award (2015)

Eric Rosenthal, Founder and Executive Director of Disability Rights International, was awarded the John Phillips Award from Phillips Exeter Academy. Each year, the John Phillips Award recognizes an Exeter alum whose life demonstrates the school’s ideal of goodness and knowledge united in noble character and usefulness to mankind.

Top Non-profits (2013)

Disability Rights International was identified by 74 experts, through Philanthropedia (a division of Guidestar), in the top ten high-impact nonprofits working in the field of people with disabilities.

Henry Viscardi Achievement Awards (2013)

Laurie Ahern, President of DRI received the award given by Viscardi center to leaders in the field of disability activism.

Charles Bronfman Award (2013)

DRI was awarded the Charles Bronfman Award recognizing DRI's work in "awakening the world's conscience to protect the human rights of children and adults with disabilities; documenting the segregation and abusive treatment of people with disabilities in dozens of countries; training and inspiring disability and human rights activists; and appealing to governments and world bodies to protect a vulnerable and overlooked population."

Senator Paul and Mrs. Sheila Wellstone Mental Health Visionary Award (2009)

Disability Rights International was awarded the 2009 Wellstone Award. The Award was established by the Washington Psychiatric Society to recognize visionary work and actions benefiting parity in mental health, and fighting the stigma of discrimination of mental illness.

American Psychiatric Association's Human Rights Award (2009)

Disability Rights International was awarded the APA's 2009 Human Rights Award, bestowed by the Council on Global Psychiatry, a component of the APA. The Human Rights Award was established in 1990 to recognize individuals and organizations that exemplify the capacity of human beings to protect others from damage related to the professional, scientific, and clinical dimensions of mental health, at the hands of other human beings. Past recipients of the APA Human Rights Award include President Jimmy Carter and Roselyn Carter, Senators Paul Wellstone and Pete Domenici, Justice Richard Goldstone and Physicians for Human Rights.

Henry B. Betts Award (2008)

Eric Rosenthal, executive director of Disability Rights International was awarded the prestigious Henry B. Betts Award by the American Association of People with Disabilities. The Betts Award is named in honor of Henry B. Betts, M.D., a pioneer in the field of rehabilitation medicine who started his career with the Rehabilitation Institute of Chicago in 1964 and has devoted himself to improving the quality of life for people with disabilities.

Thomas J. Dodd Award in International Justice and Human Rights (2007)

The Thomas J. Dodd Research Center at the University of Connecticut awarded Disability Rights International the 2007 Thomas J. Dodd Prize in International Justice and Human Rights Prize. Disability Rights International was awarded for its efforts in advancing the cause of international justice and global human rights.
