= Victor Pineda (activist) =

Venezuelan scholar (born 1978)

Victor Santiago Pineda
- Born: November 17, 1978 (age 47); Caracas, Venezuela
- Education: University of California, Berkeley, University of California, Los Angeles
- Occupations: President, Pineda Foundation / World Enabled

Victor Santiago Pineda (born November 17, 1978) is a Venezuela-born social development scholar, serial social impact entrepreneur and disability rights expert. He is also an international speaker and consultant on accessibility related issues. Early in his career, he served as the youngest government delegate to participate in the drafting of the United Nations Convention on the Rights of Persons with Disabilities and thereafter launched the World Enabled Global Initiative, a disability affiliate program that combines the reach of the world's most active disabled persons' organizations (DPOs) and intergovernmental agencies. He also launched the Pineda Foundation, a voluntary non-profit that promotes the rights and dignities of young people with disabilities. Both were established in 2003. Since 2024 he serves as the executive director of the Center For Independent Living at Berkeley, CA.

== Background ==
Victor Santiago Pineda was born in Caracas, Venezuela, to, Julio Cesar Pineda, a law professor, TV anchor of Globovision and former Venezuelan Ambassador to Kuwait, South Korea, and Libya and Dubravka Purkarevic, a visiting professor at the US Naval Postgraduate School (NS) and former Miss Venezuela. At the age of two, Pineda was hospitalized with a high fever and for the next five years he demonstrated gradual weakening of his skeletal muscles. By age four, his weakened muscles caused him to fall repeatedly and by age seven, he stopped walking completely. His muscular deterioration would continue and eventually affect his breathing. By the time he was in high school, he needed to use a ventilator at night, and by the time he started his doctoral program in his late-twenties, he required a ventilator twenty-four hours per day.

As a child, Pineda was diagnosed with spinal muscular atrophy (SMA-Type II), a form of muscular dystrophy. However, as an adult, he was examined by a neurophysiologist who, with the use of electromyography, determined that there was no evidence to suggest Spinal muscular atrophy. The specific cause of Pineda's muscle weakness was identified as collagenopathy VI, resulting from an extremely common genetic mutation.

== Education and advocacy ==
Pineda attended Corona Del Mar High School in Newport Beach, California, and was selected by his graduating class as a commencement speaker. Upon graduating in 1997, Pineda attended the California Youth Leadership Forum for Students with Disabilities (YLF). As a freshman at the University of California Berkeley, he received specialized support services provided by the Disabled Students Office (DSP) and participated in the Disabled Students Residence Program (DSRP).

While at UC Berkeley was elected senator for the ASUC student government, defended ethnic studies, with the leadership of Andrew Berk, he helped resurrect the long dormant Disabled Students Union (DSU). During this time he established the Disability Media Initiative (DMI) and the Pineda Foundation to provide 21st century workforce skills to youth with disabilities. Pineda earned a B.A. in political economy, a B.S. in business administration and, eventually, a master's degree in city and regional planning (MCP) with a concentration in regional economic development. He then accepted an internship in Washington, D.C., where he served as a summer associate at the US Treasury's Department of International Affairs.

In 2006, Pineda received a graduate equity and diversity fellowship to pursue a doctoral degree in urban planning at the Luskin School for Public Affairs at the University of California, Los Angeles (UCLA) where he wrote his doctoral dissertation in the field of social policy formation. In 2009, he was awarded the US Department of Education's Fulbright-Hays Doctoral Dissertation Research Abroad Fellowship and the Sheikh Saud Qassimi Public Policy Fellowship at the Dubai School of Government. His dissertation made theoretical, methodological and empirical contributions to the fields of urban planning, human rights, and development. Pineda received his PhD with distinction in 2010 for his dissertation entitled, The Capability Model of Disability: Assessing the Success of UAE Federal Law No. 29 of 2006 in the Emirate of Dubai.

== Philanthropy ==
As a student at UC Berkeley, Pineda received an award for a short form documentary he directed about life in Cuba. and has subsequently used film as a platform to discuss human rights issues in Serbia, Bosnia, Thailand, Yemen, Kenya, Syria, Qatar, Armenia and other parts of the world.

Pineda formed an artist collective called, Babylon Arts Group that featured noted artists like Jasko Begovic. The mission of the group was to aid in the development of artists across a variety of disciplines including literature, music, film, and textile arts.

Through the Pineda Foundation, Pineda has helped direct 2.5 million dollars towards programs that support youth with disabilities. Through successful partnerships with UNICEF, UNESCO, the World Bank, the Pineda Foundation has elevated global attention on including youth with disabilities into development programs. Among the foundation's most significant accomplishments are the creation of "It's Our Story", the US National Flagship project that contains over 1,300 video testimonials and thousands of still photos on the current experience of living in America with a disability, the launch of World Enabled (WE) as a platform for information and inspiration sharing innovative user generated videos and success stories for disabled youth, and the Open Hands Initiative Comic Book, which launched in Damascus, Syria on August 1, 2010, and brought together disabled rights advocates from the US and Syria to work with disabled Syrian children to develop a new comic book character. Co-sponsored by Liquid Comics, with the endorsement of former President Bill Clinton, the project led to the creation of the comic book, Silver Scorpion.

== Publications ==
Pineda has authored work for diverse audiences from children's material to academic journals to the mainstream media. Through a partnership between his World Enabled Initiative and UNICEF, in 2007 Pineda authored an educational publication for children, "It's About Ability", to generate increased attention on youth with disabilities and to explain the Convention on the Rights of Persons With Disabilities. The booklet was translated in 8 languages (English, French, Spanish, Japanese, Khmer, Russian, Arabic, Serbian) with the goal of teaching disabled children about their rights. In 2010, Pineda published a substantial research project, The Capability Model of Disability: Assessing the Success of UAE Federal Law No. 29 of 2006 in the Emirate of Dubai', for his dissertation.

== Awards and honors ==
In 2009, Pineda was awarded the American Association of People with Disabilities Paul G. Hearne Award. Pineda's "It's About Ability" project was honored on February 17, 2011, in Montenegro for the Best Humanitarian Action by UNICEF. Also in 2011, he received the prestigious Mark Bingham Award for Excellence in Achievement by a Young Alumnus/a, Cal Alumni Association for his work in education and human rights.
