= Pat Rummerfield =

First person to fully recover from quadraplegia

Patrick "Pat" Rummerfield (born September 7, 1953) is the first spinal cord injury (SCI) quadriplegic in history to recover full physical mobility. He has numerous athletic accomplishments, and works as a motivational speaker.

== Early life ==
Rummerfield was born in Vallejo, California in 1953. At an early age, Rummerfield was separated from his siblings and raised in an Idaho orphanage. He was adopted at age seven. Shortly afterwards, Rummerfield's adoptive father enrolled him at YMCA, where he participated in athletics.

== Injury and rehabilitation ==
On September 20, 1974, at age 21, Rummerfield and a friend were in a near fatal car accident while traveling at 135 miles per hour (217 km/h). He has admitted he had been drinking before the accident. He was paralyzed and given less than 72 hours to live. While surviving despite his doctor's expectations, he had fractured all his ribs, broken his neck in four places, shattered his collar bone, suffered massive head injuries, and had one of his eyes placed back into its socket. As he was unable to move from the neck down, his chances of long-term survival were not good, and doctors recommended he be sent to a convalescent home. He decided not to follow the doctors' orders, and chose intensive rehabilitation. While learning to operate a wheelchair with his mouth he experienced his first rehabilitative breakthrough. He recalls, "I was lying in bed one night, thinking how much I loved to play basketball and dreamed of driving a race car one day when my big toe moved." He spent the next three years learning to walk and to use his hands again.

Over the next fourteen years, he struggled with balance and coordination problems caused by the accident. He eventually regained the ability to jog and ride a bicycle without falling down. He went through six knee surgeries and total reconstruction of his right ankle and right wrist. To this day, nerve damage to the right side of his body has left him with an off-kilter gait.

Doctors have partially credited his recovery to his commitment to a then daily regimen of intensive physical therapy, including weightlifting, jump rope, and stationary bicycle. However, this level of recovery from quadriplegia was at that time unknown.

After seventeen years of intensive rehabilitation, he is now capable of essentially normal walking, despite having over 85% of his spinal cord destroyed at C-4.

Rummerfield is sometimes described as "the world's only fully recovered quadriplegic". While his physical mobility is essentially normal, Rummerfield still experiences loss of sensation in his lower legs, impaired bowel and bladder function, reduced strength in his hands, and difficulty regulating body temperature.

== Achievements ==
In 1991, he began to compete in triathlons. In 1992, he participated in the IronMan Triathlon in Hawaii – a 2.5-mile (4.0 km) swim, 112-mile (180 km) bicycle ride and 42.195-kilometre (26.219 mi) marathon. He became the first SCI quadriplegic to participate in and complete the Hawaii IronMan.

In 1997, he ran the Antarctica Marathon – one of only 82 people to complete the 42.195-kilometre (26.219 mi) course which crosses glaciers, icy streams, rock beds and soggy beaches in sub-zero temperatures and 45 mph winds. Pat became the first SCI quadriplegic to participate and complete a marathon.

Rummerfield is the holder of the FIA World Land Speed Record for a Class III electric vehicle (over 1000 kg), at 245.5 miles per hour (395 km/h), in White Lightning, set October 22, 1999.

He is the recipient of the 2000 ESPN's Aréte Amateur Athlete of The Year Award, the United States Marines Corps "Lead By Example Medallion" and the distinguished Human Spirit Award at the 2000 Christopher Reeve/Gateway To A Cure Awards Ceremonies. He has thrown out the first pitch at a Chicago Cubs baseball game. He completed the Los Angeles Marathon. He was chosen by the Coca-Cola Company to be part of the 2004 Summer Olympics torch relay, and was the national spokesman for all the runners in the relay.

He began attending racing schools, including the Bob Bondurant School of High Performance Driving, and in October 2009 he accomplished another first by becoming the first SCI quadriplegic to participate in a professional motorsport, racing a dragster during the 2009 ADRL World Finals.

He was the first physically disabled athlete to participate and finish a stage in an adventure race, a particularly challenging athletic event.

== Motivational work and public appearances ==
Rummerfield has said about his initial injury from drunk driving, "I made a huge mistake and take full responsibility for my irresponsible actions."

His athletic endeavors raise money for a number of charities. He is co-founder of the NextSteps Foundation and of "Adventures on Wheels".

As a lecturer, Rummerfield travels nationwide to share his story and to encourage others to set goals and to "Never Give Up". Rummerfield has said, "Whenever I meet someone in a wheelchair, I make a point of letting them know that there truly is nothing special about me. I am no more deserving of a miracle than anyone else."

He has appeared on Ty Pennington's Extreme Makeover: Home Edition in support of a fellow paraplegic's recovery efforts at the Kennedy Krieger Institute.

Rummerfield was on the team at Washington University in St. Louis credited with helping Christopher Reeve regain function. He has been featured on the Discovery Channel and Ripley's Believe It or Not, among other media.
