= White Lightning (car) =

The White Lightning was the world's fastest electric car. On October 22, 1999, the car set a world land speed record for an electric-powered vehicle of 245.523 mph (395.131 km/h) over a distance of one mile at the Bonneville Salt Flats race track near Wendover, Utah.

Two electric motors with controllers and a complex 420 volt battery pack consisting of 6,120 nickel-metal hydride, AA sized batteries power the car. The two 150-kilowatt (201 hp) rated motors provide roughly the equivalent of 400 hp (298 kilowatts). Dempsey's World Record Associates (DWRA) built the car, which Pat Rummerfield, known as the first fully recovered quadriplegic in the world, drove to world records.

In October 2003, the Buckeye Bullet surpassed White Lightning's record. The Buckeye Bullet again surpassed the White Lightning's record in October 2004, increasing the electric record to 315.958 mph (508.485 km/h).
