= Marilyn Saviola =

American disability rights activist (1945–2019)

- Marilyn Saviola, from a 1965 publication
- Born: Marilyn Elizabeth Saviola; July 13, 1945; Manhattan, New York, US
- Died: November 23, 2019 (aged 74); Brooklyn, New York, US
- Education: Long Island University, BA; New York University, MA
- Occupation: Disability rights activist

Marilyn E. Saviola (July 13, 1945 – November 23, 2019) was an American disability rights activist, executive director of the Center for the Independence of the Disabled in New York from 1983 to 1999, and vice president of Independence Care System after 2000. Saviola, a polio survivor from Manhattan, New York, is known nationally within the disability rights movement for her advocacy for people with disabilities and had accepted many awards and honors for her work.

== Early life and education ==
On July 13, 1945, Saviola was born in Manhattan at the New York Hospital. Her parents, Peter Saviola and Camilla 'Millie' Saviola, who had no other children, were Italian immigrants who ran a candy shop/luncheonette in the Bronx. In August 1955, a few weeks after her tenth birthday, Saviola contracted polio. She was hospitalized at Willard Parker Hospital, a communicable disease hospital, and placed in an iron lung for two months. The polio caused her quadriplegia; she used a wheelchair and a ventilator.

"I don't think my friends really saw me as an equal," she recalled in 2001. "I know my family never accepted it, [they] totally didn't, and always thought of it as if I prayed enough, and they were good enough, they said enough novenas or whatever, ... I would be cured."

Because her family's home was not accessible, Saviola lived at Goldwater Memorial Hospital on Roosevelt Island during her teen years. Saviola was part of creating the hospital's ward for young adult patients, with more age-appropriate routines, activities and outings. She attended Long Island University, earning a bachelor's degree in psychology in 1970. For her freshman year, she and another Goldwater patient attended classes remotely, by telephone, and took tests by mail, an arrangement "believed to be the first of its kind used in a hospital in the state". She later earned a master's degree in rehabilitation counseling from New York University. She met activist Judy Heumann at LIU, where they were both students.

== Career ==
Saviola was a rehabilitation counselor for 11 years at Goldwater Memorial Hospital in the 1970s and early 1980s. While working at Goldwater Memorial, Saviola assisted individuals with severe physical disabilities and helped them with transitioning from living in the hospital to living in the community. She was executive director of the Center for the Independence of the Disabled in New York from 1983 to 1998, and vice president of Independence Care System after 2000. She chaired the Manhattan Borough Disability Advisory Group, and served on the boards of the Association of Independent Living Centers in New York, Disabled in Action, and the New York City Medicaid Managed Care Task Force. Saviola worked for state legislation to support community living and independence for disabled New Yorkers.

Saviola had particular interest in disabled women's rights and health issues. In 1979, she spoke at one of the first conferences on disabled women's lives, sponsored by the New York City Commission on the Status of Women and the Mayor's Office for the Handicapped. Her fellow speakers included disability rights activists Sandra Schnur, Maria Nardone, and Frieda Zames. Her advocacy work was credited in 2019 at the opening of a new radiology unit at NYC Health + Hospitals' Morrisania location in the Bronx, which featured accessible examination tables and mammography equipment.

She helped found Concepts of Independence in 1977, which The New York Times described as a non-profit corporation "to enable users of home care services to interview, hire, supervise and dismiss their own assistants." In 2015, she received the Henry Viscardi Achievement Award for her lifetime of work in disability rights and in 2017, the New York State Disability Rights Hall of Fame inducted Saviola as part of their inaugural class of inductees.

== Personal life ==
On November 23, 2019, Saviola died at her home in Brooklyn at age 74 years. At the time Robert Geraghty was her long-term partner. An oral history interview with Saviola, about her life and activism, was recorded in 2001, is archived with the Disability Rights and Independent Living Movement (DRILM) Oral History Project at the Bancroft Library in Berkeley, California.

== See also ==
- List of polio survivors
