= Henry Viscardi Jr. =

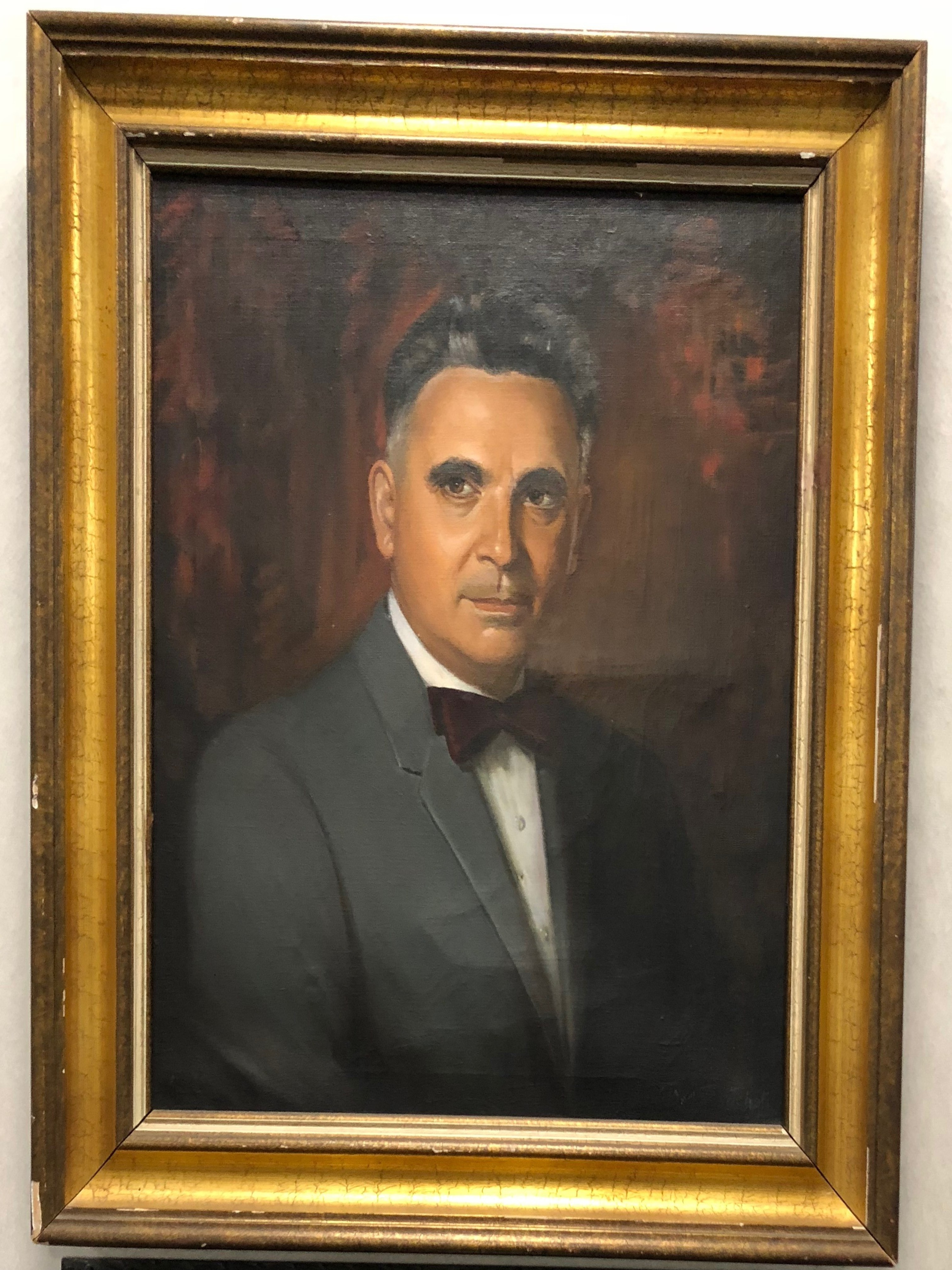
- Born: Henry Viscardi Jr. May 10, 1912; United States
- Died: April 14, 2004 (aged 91); United States
- Occupation: Disability rights activist
- Spouse: Lucile
- Children: 4

Henry Viscardi Jr. (1912-2004) was an American disability rights advocate who championed the cause of equality and employment of disabled people in workforce. In 1952, on Eleanor Roosevelt's advice, he founded Abilities, Inc. which has now expanded to the Viscardi Center - a non-profit organization and global leader advocating for the empowerment of people with disabilities. To provide equal educational opportunities to children with disabilities of all ages, he founded the Human Resources School in Albertson, New York in 1952, which was later renamed the Henry Viscardi School in his honor. He served as advisor to several US presidents bringing many policy changes in the disability sector. He is also the author of the book Give Us The Tools. In his honour, the Viscardi Center in 2013 started the Henry Viscardi Achievement Awards to identify and recognize exemplary leaders from the disability community.

== See also ==
- Viscardi Center
- Henry Viscardi School
- Henry Viscardi Achievement Awards
