= Federico Mora National Hospital =

Psychiatric hospital in Guatemala

Coordinates: 14.6648°N 90.4780°W

Federico Mora National Hospital, located in Guatemala City, Guatemala, serves as the primary public psychiatric facility in Guatemala. It provides mental health care to individuals from across the country and also houses persons transferred from the nearby prison system, including those deemed mentally unfit to stand trial. People have written about their experiences volunteering at the hospital.

== Human rights concerns ==
The hospital has faced criticism from international organizations and human rights advocates. Reports have highlighted issues such as overcrowding, unsanitary conditions, and inadequate staffing. Disability Rights International (DRI) raised concerns about the treatment of patients, including allegations of abuse and neglect. The Inter-American Commission on Human Rights (IACHR) has been involved in addressing concerns related to the hospital. Scholars have written about the hospital and wider system.

=== Deaths ===
In 2020, during the COVID-19 pandemic, Patient #10451 died at the hospital. He was transferred to the hospital in 1991 where he lived for over three decades before his death.
