= Henry Viscardi School =

Coordinates: 40.768549°N 73.658094°W

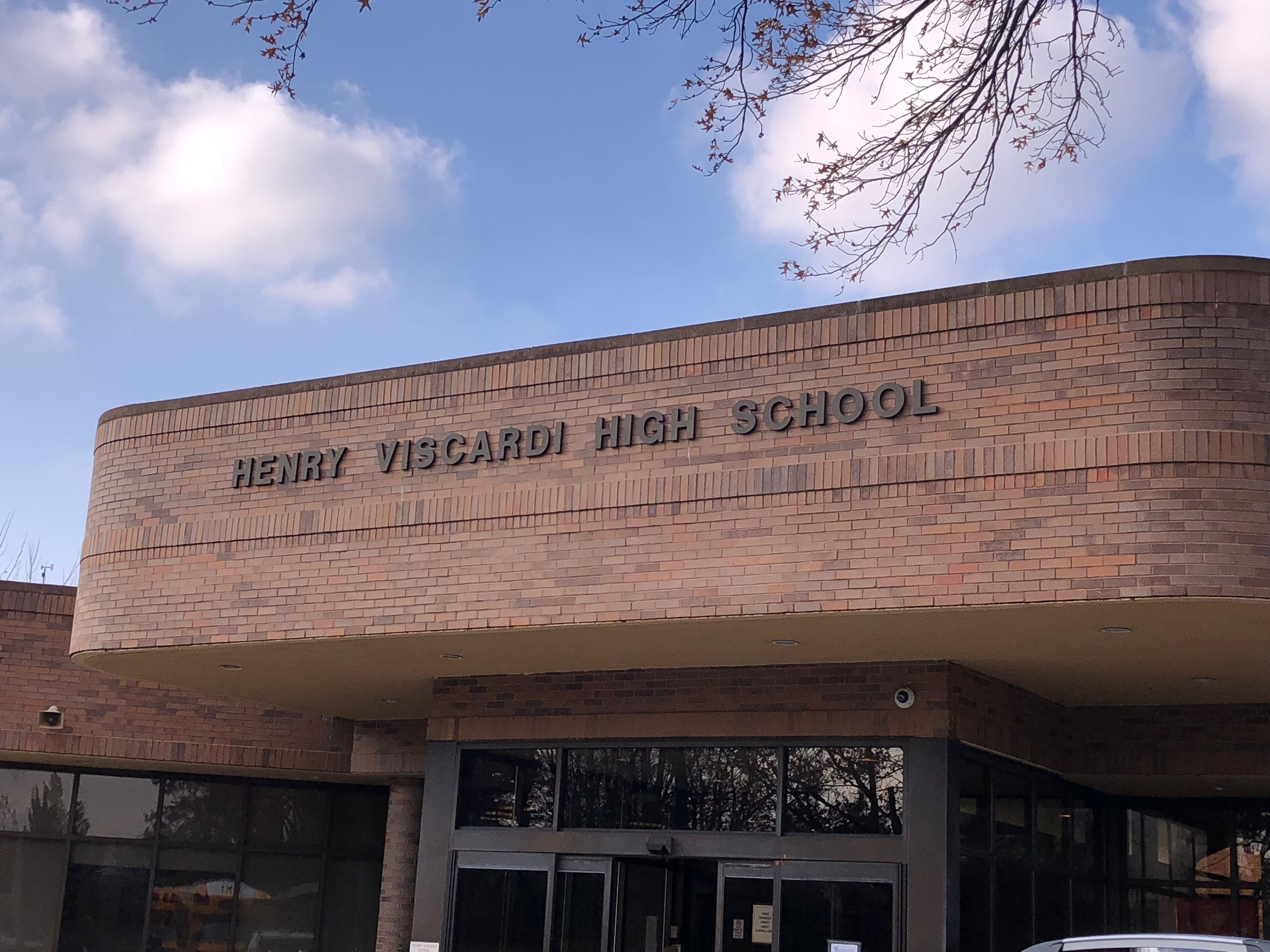

Location
- 201 I.U. Willets Road, Albertson, NY 11507; Searingtown, New York, United States

Information
- Established: 1962
- Enrollment: 185
- Student to teacher ratio: 9:1:1
- Website: School website

Henry Viscardi School is a state supported special school in Searingtown, New York operated by the Viscardi Center in New York for severely disabled students requiring a specialized educational setting with medical supports. The school is located in Searingtown, New York.

== Description ==
The school enrolls students in grades pre-K through 12. The school was originally called The Human Resources School. Founded by Henry Viscardi Jr. and supported by public and private initiatives, the tuition-free school was the only one of its kind in the world. It was renamed in honor of its founder.

The school's president, John D. Kemp – himself born without full arms or legs, has won the Henry B. Betts award known as the USA's highest honor for disability leadership and service and the 2014 Dole Leadership Prize for public inspiration.

== Academics ==
The Henry Viscardi School is a state-accredited institution of learning. All students are classified for special education and provided services mandated by the Individuals with Disabilities Education Act (IDEA). It is attended by physically disabled students with high academic performance.

== See also ==
- Henry Viscardi Jr.
- Viscardi Center
- Henry Viscardi Achievement Awards
- John D. Kemp
