= National Down Syndrome Society =

American nonprofit organization

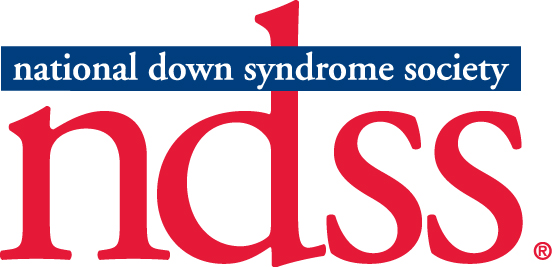
- NDSS Logo
- Abbreviation: NDSS
- Formation: 1979
- Purpose: Disability Advocate
- Headquarters: Manhattan, New York City, New York, US
- Official language: English, Spanish
- President & CEO: Kandi Pickard
- Affiliations: 375
- Budget: $2,000,000+
- Website: www.ndss.org

The National Down Syndrome Society (NDSS) is an American organization that offers support to people with Down syndrome, their families, friends, teachers, and coworkers, and educates the general public about Down syndrome. The mission of the NDSS is to be the leading human rights organization for all individuals with Down syndrome.

== History ==
The NDSS was founded by Betsy Goodwin and Arden Moulton. Goodwin's daughter, Carson was born in 1978 with Down Syndrome. The parents soon discovered that the support and resources available to parents with children with Down syndrome were very limited. Goodwin and Arden created the NDSS, which gained official nonprofit status in 1979. The National Down Syndrome Society envisions "a world in which all people with Down syndrome have the opportunity to enhance their quality of life, realize their life aspirations and become valued members of welcoming communities."

== Areas of programming ==
NDSS focuses on four items of programming to enhance the quality of life for those with Down syndrome.

- The National Policy Center creates systematic change through legislative policy.
- The National Buddy Walk Program honors and celebrates individuals with Down syndrome in their communities.
- The Public Awareness Initiatives bring new and positive presentations of Down syndrome to the public.
- The Community Programs provide information and resources about Down syndrome.

== Other Initiatives ==
- NDSS holds an annual Times Square Video Presentation to highlight individuals with Down syndrome and promote acceptance and inclusion. Approximately 500 individuals from around the world are celebrated each year, in Times Square, during their hour-long video presentation.
- NDSS has garnered recognition for its "National Advocacy & Policy Center's" legislative agenda. NDSS' advocacy team has worded to pass legislation intended to help people with Down syndrome overcome stated challenges. This includes a bill 2021 bill that was introduced called "Charlotte Woodward Organ Transplant Discrimination Prevention Act". The Act's intent is to prevent transplant discrimination at the State and Federal level, against people with Down Syndrome.
- NDSS collaborated with Mattel on their first Barbie doll with Down Syndrome in 2023.

== Public Webinar ==
In January 2019, the NDSS offered a free public webinar on facilitated communication held by Christine Ashby. This communication method is based on the theory that many people that are unable to speak and are not cognitively impaired, but are simply unable to produce the sounds for speech. A helper or "facilitator" assists by guiding the non-speaking person's hand over a keyboard. Many masked independent tests and studies have suggested that the facilitator is actually the one doing the typing, and not the person with the disability. Stuart Vyse, reporting for Skeptical Inquirer, commented that "Given NDSS's mission of being 'The leading human rights organization for all individuals with Down syndrome,' it is not surprising the organization supports a communication method that [Christy] Ashby [PhD] described as a 'human right and a civil right.' Nonetheless, it is unfortunate that a leading Down syndrome advocacy group is promoting a belief system over evidence-based methods that work."
