= Faʻatino Masunu Utumapu =

Faʻatino Mataafa Utumapu
- Born: 1982 (age 43–44)
- Education: Wesley College, Manurewa High School
- Awards: Pasifika Award (2017)

Faʻatino Mataafa Utumapu (born 1982) is a disability rights activist from Samoa.

== Background ==
Utumapu, the daughter of Reverend Taito Masunu and Senerita Utumapu of Tuanaʻi, grew up in Safotu, on the island of Savaiʻi. She attended Wesley College (in Apia) and Manurewa High School.

== Career ==
In 2014, her advocacy around the value of identifying people with disabilities led to Samoa being the first Pacific country to collect information on disability. As a result, disability was included in the country's 2014 Demographic and Health Survey and 2016 National Census. In 2016 Utumapu also led the registration of people with disabilities during the national elections in Samoa, the first time the category had been included during an election.

Utumapu's advocacy work has also supported the creation of the Wheelchair Users Association of Samoa and Samoa Association of the Deaf.

Utumapu was selected as one of ten disability leaders in the Pacific region to facilitate in the regional implementation of the Convention on the Rights of Persons with Disabilities. She is the Co-chair for the Pacific committee of youth with disabilities, a member of the Pacific Disability Forum's Resource Team.

Utumapu currently works with Nuanua O Le Alofa, an advocacy organisation for persons with disabilities in Samoa, and represented the organisation at the 60th Session of the Commission on the Status of Women in New York.

As a female matai, she is considered a community leader. She is also an executive member of the Samoa Umbrella for Non Governmental Organisations.

== Awards ==
In 2017 Mataafa received the Pacific Disability Forum's Pasifika Award. In January 2021 she was announced as one of the Samoa Observer's "people of 2020".
