= City of Cleburne v. Cleburne Living Center, Inc. =

- Supreme Court of the United States

Argued March 18, 1985 Decided April 23, 1985
- Full case name: City of Cleburne, Texas, et al. v. Cleburne Living Center, et al.
- Citations: 473 U.S. 432 (more) 105 S. Ct. 3249; 87 L. Ed. 2d 313

Holding
- Possessing an intellectual disability is not a quasi-suspect classification calling for a heightened level of scrutiny, but nevertheless, the requirement of a special use permit for a proposed group home for people with intellectual disabilities violated the Equal Protection Clause of the Fourteenth Amendment because no rational basis for the discriminatory classification could be shown, and in the absence of such justification, the classification appeared to be based on irrational prejudice against the intellectually disabled.

Court membership
- Chief Justice Warren E. Burger Associate Justices William J. Brennan Jr. · Byron White; Thurgood Marshall · Harry Blackmun; Lewis F. Powell Jr. · William Rehnquist; John P. Stevens · Sandra Day O'Connor

Case opinions
- Majority: White, joined by Burger, Powell, Rehnquist, Stevens, O'Connor
- Concurrence: Stevens, joined by Burger
- Concur/dissent: Marshall, joined by Brennan, Blackmun

Laws applied
- U.S. Const. amend. XIV

City of Cleburne v. Cleburne Living Center, Inc., 473 U.S. 432 (1985), was a U.S. Supreme Court case involving discrimination against intellectually disabled people.

In 1980, Cleburne Living Center, Inc. (CLC) submitted a permit application seeking approval to build a group home for intellectually disabled people. The city of Cleburne, Texas refused to grant CLC a permit on the basis of a municipal zoning ordinance. CLC then sued the City of Cleburne on the theory that the denial of the permit violated the Fourteenth Amendment Equal Protection rights of CLC and their potential residents.

Applying rational basis review, the U.S. Supreme Court struck down the ordinance as applied to CLC. The Court declined to rule that intellectually disabled people were a quasi-suspect or suspect class.

== Background ==
In July 1980, Jan Hannah purchased a building at 201 Featherston Street, within the city limits of Cleburne, with the intent of leasing it to CLC so that they could operate it as a group home for intellectually disabled people. The home was intended to house a total of thirteen mentally disabled men and women. CLC staff would supervise the residents at all times. The house itself had four bedrooms and two baths, with another half bath to be added.

The city of Cleburne informed CLC that a special use permit would be required for a group home such as this, and so CLC submitted the permit application. The city's zoning regulations required that a special use permit, renewable annually, was required for the construction of "[hospitals] for the insane or feeble-minded, or alcoholics or drug addicts, or penal or correctional institutions" (436). The city had classified the group home as a "hospital for the feebly minded" (437). The Planning and Zoning Commission denied the request, and CLC's Hannah, Bobbie Northrop, and David Southern moved their request to the City Council.

The city of Cleburne held a public hearing on the meeting, after which they denied the special use permit to CLC on a vote of 3 to 1.

== Case history ==
After their special use permit was denied CLC filed suit in Federal District Court against the city, alleging that the zoning ordinance was invalid on its face and as applied because it discriminated against intellectually disabled people in violation of the equal protection rights of CLC and its potential residents. The Federal District Court found that if the potential residents of CLC's group home had not been intellectually disabled the permit would have been granted. However, they upheld the city's ordinance and actions as constitutional. The District Court held that intellectually disabled people were neither a suspect nor a quasi-suspect class and therefore the rational basis test should be applied. The court held that the ordinance was rationally related to the city's legitimate interest in "the legal responsibility of CLC and its residents, . . . the safety and fears of residents in the adjoining neighborhood," and the number of people to be housed in the home.

The Federal Court of Appeals for the Fifth Circuit reversed the decision of the District Court. The Court of Appeals held that an intellectual disability was a quasi-suspect class and therefore intermediate scrutiny should be applied to the ordinance. Applying the heightened scrutiny standard to the ordinance, the court held it was unconstitutional on its face and as applied. The city appealed the decision to the Supreme Court, which granted certiorari.

== Supreme Court opinion ==
Justice White's majority opinion invalidated the ordinance as applied to CLC, holding that the denial of the permit was based on irrational prejudice against intellectually disabled people and hence was invalid under the Equal Protection Clause of the Fourteenth Amendment.

Unlike most cases where the Court uses rational basis review, the Court did not accept the city's claimed interest. Some commentators have referred to this investigation into the actual reasons for passing the law as "rational basis with bite".

The Court declined to grant intellectually disabled people status as a suspect or quasi-suspect class because they are a "large and diversified group" amply protected by state and federal legislatures. Therefore, any legislation that distinguishes between intellectually disabled people and others must be rationally related to a legitimate government interest in order to withstand equal protection review. This is also known as rational basis review and is the lowest level of review under the Equal Protection Clause of the Fourteenth Amendment.

Justice Marshall, dissenting in part and concurring in the result of invalidating the statute, argued that due to the history of discrimination against intellectually disabled people, the Court should employ a higher standard of scrutiny (see Equal Protection scrutiny) when examining laws that regulated those with mental disabilities.

== Significance ==
Although the Supreme Court declined to classify those with mental disabilities as a suspect or quasi-suspect class, the decision is one of the few instances in which the Supreme Court has held government legislation to be unconstitutional when it applied a rational basis level of review. Another example of the Supreme Court holding that government legislation was unconstitutional when it applied to rational basis level of review was the landmark gay-rights decision in Romer v. Evans.

== See also ==
- Department of Agriculture v. Moreno (1973)
- Romer v. Evans (1996)
