= Viscardi Center =

Non-profit in Albertson, New York, US

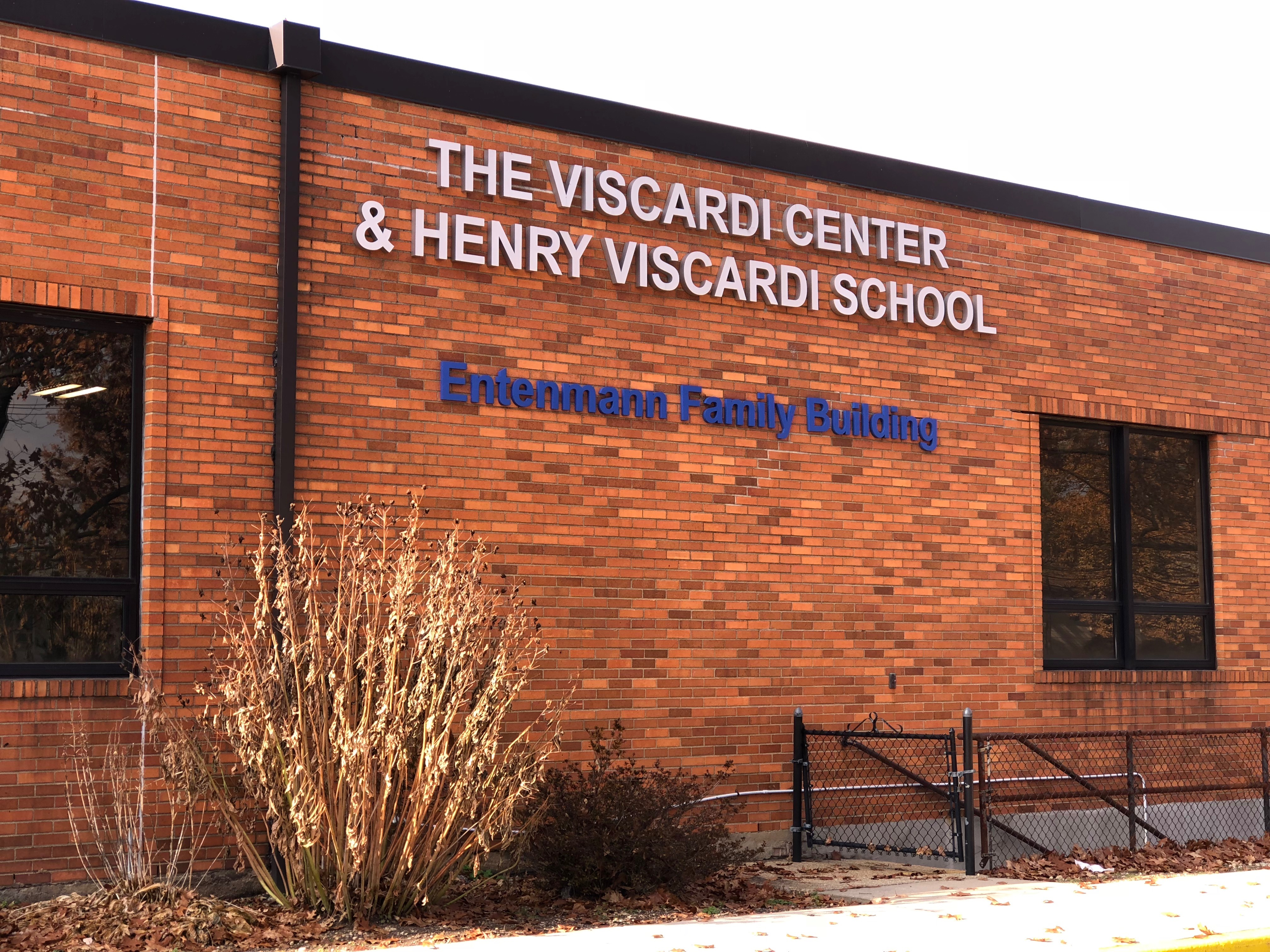
Viscardi Center

The Viscardi Center is a non-profit organization in Albertson, New York, dedicated to educating, empowering and employing people with disabilities. It was founded in 1952 by Henry Viscardi, Jr., a noted disability activist, who was also advisor to eight US Presidents on matters pertaining to disability policies. John D. Kemp is the current President of the Viscardi Center.

To provide a lifespan of services, the Viscardi Center comprises:

- Abilities, Inc. for entry or reentry into the workforce for adults with disabilities through job training.
- Henry Viscardi School for children with disabilities.
- National business & disability council streamline adult with disabilities into businesses.
- Nathaniel H. Kornreich Technology Center (KTC), a state-of-art assistive technology service provider for people with disabilities.

== See also ==
- Henry Viscardi Achievement Awards
