= Disability Rights Education and Defense Fund =

American advocacy group

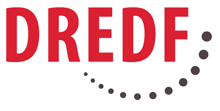
- Abbreviation: DREDF
- Formation: 1979
- Website: dredf.org

The Disability Rights Education and Defense Fund (DREDF) is a national cross-disability civil rights law and policy center directed by individuals with disabilities and parents who have children with disabilities. Founded in 1979, DREDF attempts to advance the civil and human rights of people with disabilities through legal advocacy, training, education, and public policy and legislative development. It has offices in Berkeley, California and Washington, D.C.

The directing attorney is Arlene B. Mayerson.

== History ==
=== 1980s ===
DREDF's early efforts focused on:

- Alliances with national civil rights leadership
- Preventing the Reagan administration's Task Force on Regulatory Relief's attempts to deregulate Section 504 of the Rehabilitation Act of 1973

=== 1990s ===
Following the passage of the ADA, DREDF focused on preserving the law and shaping its implementation by providing nationwide training and technical assistance, as well as writing and publishing a legal series that presented ADA legislative history and commentary. In a series of cases, DREDF won the right of children with disabilities who require healthcare assistance (such as diabetes and asthma) to receive such assistance in pre-school and recreational settings.

In an effort to promote community integration, DREDF works with community and legal groups to challenge the institutionalization of disabled residents at San Francisco's Laguna Honda Hospital and to create community-based alternatives. Other ADA litigation has opened movie theaters, hotels, banking services, and gas stations to disabled individuals.

DREDF represented Members of Congress in cases involving the definition of disability under the ADA. Continuing its commitment to IDEA implementation, DREDF secured court judgments that established a national precedent for the full inclusion of children with disabilities in regular classes in Holland v. Sacramento City School District and established educational rights for children with disabilities in East Palo Alto, California. As interest in disability rights gained international momentum, disability rights leaders from 17 countries invited legal and policy staff to consult and collaborate on strategies for advancing policy in their countries.

=== 2000s ===
Other litigation succeeded in requiring the U.S. Social Security Administration to provide all notices to beneficiaries in alternative formats.
