= List of disability rights activists =

A disability-rights activist or disability-rights advocate is someone who works towards the equality of people with disabilities. Such a person is generally considered a member of the disability-rights movement and/or the independent-living movement.

== A ==
- Javed Abidi – director of the National Centre for Promotion of Employment for Disabled People (NCPEDP) in India
- Abia Akram – disability rights activist from Pakistan; founder of the National Forum of Women with Disabilities in Pakistan; prominent figure in the disability rights movement in the country, as well as in Asia and the Pacific; named one of the BBC's 100 Women in 2021
- Ola Abu Al Ghaib – disability activist from Palestine, focusses on inclusion, gender and disability rights
- Hiljmnijeta Apuk – founding director of the Little People of Kosovo
- Fatima al-Aqel – opened a school for blind women in Yemen in 1995
- Keith Armstrong (activist) – campaigned for transport and housing rights and photographed disability rights protests.

== B ==
- Mel Baggs – autism rights activist and blogger
- Safiya al Bahlani – Omani artist, graphic designer, disability rights activist, and motivational speaker
- Jamala al-Baidhani – created the Al-Tahadi Association for Disabled Females, the first group in Yemen devoted to helping girls with disabilities
- Julia Bascom – autistic rights activist and former executive director of the Autistic Self Advocacy Network
- Andrew Batavia – ADA regulations drafter, co-founder of AUTONOMY, Inc.
- Giselle Bellas – Cuban-American singer-songwriter; Alzheimer's disease advocate
- Sister Sponsa Beltran – worked with children and people with disabilities in Liberia
- Dana Bolles – spaceflight engineer and advocate for those with disabilities in STEM
- Shahar Botzer – Israeli activist who promoted a law to provide equal right to education for children with disabilities
- Tiffany Brar – founder of Jyothirgamaya Foundation, a not for profit NGO for visually impaired
- Gabriela Brimmer – had cerebral palsy; life chronicled in the American-Mexican drama film Gaby: A True Story (1987), directed by Luis Mandoki
- Marca Bristo – cofounded the (American) National Council on Independent Living (NCIL) with Max Starkloff and Charlie Carr
- Ly Xīnzhèn M. Zhǎngsūn Brown – autistic activist and writer
- Sheletta Brundidge – children's author and autism advocate

== C ==
- Jane Campbell, Baroness Campbell of Surbiton – commissioner of the British Disability Rights Commission
- Charlie Carr – cofounder of National Council on Independent Living, Boston Center for Independent Living and founder and CEO of The Northeast Independent Living Program in Lawrence, Massachusetts; went on to become Commissioner of the Massachusetts Rehabilitation Commission under Governor Deval Patrick
- Liz Carr – British actress, comedian, broadcaster and international disability rights activist
- Bob Casey, Jr. – United States Senator from Pennsylvania, widely recognized as a leading advocate for people with disabilities expansion of Medicaid home and community-based services
- Mama Cax – American-Haitian model and disabled rights activist
- Judi Chamberlin – American activist, leader, organizer, public speaker and educator in the psychiatric survivors movement; her political activism followed her involuntary confinement in a psychiatric facility in the 1960s; author of On Our Own: Patient-Controlled Alternatives to the Mental Health System, a foundational text in the Mad Pride movement
- James I. Charlton – activist and author of Nothing About Us Without Us
- María Soledad Cisternas – Chilean disability rights activist, member of the committee that drafted the Convention on the Rights of Persons with Disabilities and served as the chairperson on the Committee on the Rights of Persons with Disabilities; in 2017, was appointed the Special Envoy on Disability and Accessibility for the United Nations
- Claudia Cockburn – British activist for transportation accessibility
- Tony Coelho – former congressman from California, primary author and U.S. House sponsor of the Americans with Disabilities Act
- Rebecca Cokley – Executive Director of the National Council on Disability
- Kitty Cone – disability rights activist and staff member of the Disability Rights Education and Defense Fund
- Merry Cross – Founding member of Liberation Network of People with Disabilities and member of Disabled People Against Cuts
- Lois Curtis – American activist and the lead plaintiff in a U.S. Supreme Court case about unjustified segregation of people with disabilities in healthcare institutions

== D ==
- Andrea Dalzell – American nurse and disability rights activist
- Paul Darke – British academic and international disability rights activist
- Justin Whitlock Dart Jr. – co-founder of the American Association of People with Disabilities
- Lilian Dibo Eyong – Cameroonian model, disability rights activist, women's rights advocate, mental health advocate and educator.
- Nyle DiMarco – activist and spokesperson for LEAD-K, 'Language Equality and Acquisition for Deaf Kids' campaign for American Sign Language and English in education setting
- Rich Donovan – economist and founder of the Return On Disability Index
- Theresa Ducharme – founder of the disabled-rights advocacy group People in Equal Participation Inc. in 1981; the organization's chair for many years thereafter
- April Dunn – helped pass Act 833 in Louisiana which helped provide alternatives to graduation for students who cannot pass the standardized tests

== E ==
- Anne Emerman – director of the New York City Mayor's Office for Disabilities (MOPD) during the administration of David Dinkins
- Dominick Evans – filmmaker, activist, founder of #FilmDis; Media & Entertainment advocate for Center for Disability Rights in New York
- Edward Evans – Chairman of the UK Ministry of Health Health Advisory Committee on Handicapped Persons 1949–1960

== F ==
- Fred Fay – American advocate for disabled persons
- Chai Feldblum – lead attorney on legal team that drafted the Americans with Disabilities Act of 1990
- Julie Fernandez – actress with osteogenesis imperfecta; founded The Disability Foundation; active in presentation of disabled people
- Vic Finkelstein – South African born activist and academic, pioneer of the social model of disability
- Catherine Frazee – co-director of Ryerson University's Institute for Disability Studies Research and Education
- Lex Frieden – Chairman of the National Council on Disability 2002–2006; key developer of the Americans with Disabilities Act
- Judy Fryd – founded group in 1946 for parents of children with a learning disability; the group later became Mencap

== G ==
- Haben Girma – first deafblind graduate of Harvard Law School
- Marilyn Golden – disability transportation activist
- Miro Griffiths – disabled academic and activist
- Chen Guangcheng – Chinese civil rights activist

== H ==
- Rick Hansen – former Canadian Paralympian; raised $20 million for spinal cord research, rehabilitation and wheelchair sports by travelling by wheelchair through 34 countries
- Adam Harris – autistic founder of AsIAm
- Laura Hershey – protested MDA Labor Day Telethon; a feminist born with a form of muscular dystrophy
- Judith Heumann – wheelchair user who co-founded the World Institute on Disability; served as its co-director 1983–1993; became the Special Advisor for International Disability Rights at the U.S. Department of State
- Paul Hunt (activist) – was an early disability rights activist and leader of disabled people's campaigns in the UK against residential institutions and for independent living. Edited a seminal volume on disability, Stigma: The Experience of Disability.

== I ==
- Tonya Ingram – brought awareness through her writing to subjects such as chronic illness, organ donation, Lupus, kidney failure, the COVID-19 pandemic's impact on disabled people, mental illness, suicide, depression, and disability rights
- Davina Ingrams, 18th Baroness Darcy de Knayth – British Paralympian and Representative peer
- Malvika Iyer – bilateral amputee, disability rights activist, and member of United Nations IANYD's Working Group

== J ==
- Casar Jacobson – Norwegian-Canadian autism, disability, and gender equality rights activist; UN Women Youth Champion; former Miss Canada (2013); bilaterally deaf and uses American Sign Language
- Tommy Jessop - British actor and activist with Down syndrome, who was the main spokesperson behind the campaign for the Down Syndrome Act 2022
- Harriet McBryde Johnson – a New Mobility "Person of the Year"; disability-rights attorney and anti-euthanasia activist
- I. King Jordan – first deaf president of Gallaudet University

== K ==
- Helen Keller – American deaf-blind political activist, writer, and lecturer
- Dom Kelly – American disability rights and justice activist, founder of New Disabled South, musician, writer, and organizer with cerebral palsy
- John D. Kemp – American disability-rights activist; President and CEO of Viscardi center and the Henry Viscardi School
- Abha Khetarpal – Indian disability-rights activist, founder of Cross The Hurdles, the first-ever counselling/educational resource website and mobile application designed exclusively for people with disabilities
- Lizzie Kiama – Kenyan founder of This-Ability Trust
- Bonnie Sherr Klein – directed the documentary film Shameless: The ART of Disability (2006)
- Raul Krauthausen – German disability rights activist

== L ==
- Frank Larkin – activist who, inspired by the frustrations of living with spina bifida, sought to improve the lives of others with the condition; attended the European Parliament and other continental-level events
- Paul K. Longmore – American history professor and activist; instrumental in the establishment of disability studies as an academic discipline, and in changes to Social Security that granted people with disabilities more rights
- Carrie Ann Lucas – disability rights attorney

== M ==
- Neil Marcus – actor and playwright active in the development of disability culture
- Robert Martin – activist for independent living for disabled people
- Noor Al Mazroei – chef and disability rights activist from Qatar
- Ron McCallum – member of Committee on the Rights of Persons with Disabilities; has been on the National People with Disabilities and Carers Council; Chair of Radio for the Print Handicapped of New South Wales Co-operative Ltd.; the first totally blind person to have been appointed to a full professorship at an Australian university
- Anne McDonald – activist for independent living for disabled people
- Kathryn McGee – American activist who founded the National Association for Down Syndrome and the National Down Syndrome Congress; her daughter Tricia had Down syndrome
- Eva Middleton – Belizean advocate for disability rights and involved with the Belize Assembly for Persons with Diverse Abilities (BAPDA)
- Jillian Mercado- model
- Stacey Milbern – American activist who helped establish the disability justice movement
- Paul Steven Miller – American civil rights lawyer, activist and law professor, was a Commissioner of the US Equal Employment Opportunity Commission and author of the Genetic Information Nondiscrimination Act
- Leroy F. Moore Jr. – African American writer, poet, community activist, feminist, and the founder of Krip-Hop
- Alf Morris – introduced the Chronically Sick and Disabled Persons Act and first "Minister for the Disabled" in Great Britain or anywhere else

== N ==
- Sainimili Naivalu – Fijian table tennis medallist and activist
- Karen Nakamura – American academic, author, filmmaker, photographer and the Robert and Colleen Haas Distinguished Chair of Disability Studies and Professor of Anthropology at University of California, Berkeley
- Neema Namadamu – women's rights and disability rights activist in the Democratic Republic of the Congo (DRC)
- Ari Ne'eman – co-creator of the Autistic Self Advocacy Network
- Yetnebersh Nigussie – blind lawyer and disability rights and anti-AIDS activist from Ethiopia; founded the Ethiopian Center for Disability and Development (ECDD)

== O ==
- Corbett O'Toole – disability rights activist and author in Berkeley, California; established the National Disabled Women's Educational Equity Project
- Mary Jane Owen – disability rights activist, philosopher, policy expert and writer who has lived and worked in Washington, D.C. since 1979

== P ==
- Dinesh Palipana - quadriplegic doctor and lawyer
- Jean-Christophe Parisot – founder of Collectif des Démocrates Handicapés
- Ajith C. S. Perera – Chief Executive Idiriya in Sri Lanka activist in favour of the social model of disability and Inclusive Society
- Richard Pimentel – activist for workplace rights for disabled people
- Victor Pineda – American activist, participated as government delegate in the drafting of the Convention on the Rights of Persons with Disabilities

== R ==
- Dinah Radtke – German activist in the disability rights movement
- Alan Reich – founder of the National Organization on Disability
- Maria Verónica Reina (1960s–2017) – Argentine educational psychologist and disability rights activist
- Gilberto Rincón Gallardo – Mexican politician with shortened arms who worked on disability issues
- Edward Roberts – first quadriplegic to attend the University of California, Berkeley; his fight for access at Berkeley spread into seeking access in the community and the development of the first Centre for Independent Living
- John Elder Robison – autism rights activist and author
- Jay Ruderman – President of the Ruderman Family Foundation, advocating for the rights of people with disabilities in the United States and in Israel

== S ==
- Ali Saberi – member of the City Council of Tehran and one of the highest-paid lawyers in Iran with a fee around $1.7 million
- Yuliia Sachuk – Ukrainian activist for the rights of the disabled people
- Peggy S. Salters – first survivor of electroshock treatment in the United States to win a jury verdict and a large money judgment ($635,177) in compensation for extensive permanent amnesia and cognitive disability caused by the procedure
- Sandra Schnur – director of the New York City Half-fare Program for the Handicapped; wrote an early guide for disabled in the city; had quadriplegia
- Judy Castle Scott – blind advocate and activist in the field of vision loss
- Annie Segarra – American YouTuber and intersectional activist
- Nabil Shaban – Jordanian-British actor, journalist, and founder of The Graeae, a theater group which promotes disabled performers
- D. P. Sharma – Indian disability rights activist working for equal opportunity in education, tech enabled education access, and transformation in education and employment policies
- Muhammad Atif Sheikh – a global disability rights activist from Pakistan; promoter of disability rights since 1997; founder of Special Talent Exchange Programme; named to the D-30 Disability Impact List in 2023 compiled by Diversability.
- Eunice Kennedy Shriver – lifelong advocate for people with intellectual disabilities who founded Special Olympics International in 1968
- Jim Sinclair – coordinator and founder of Autism Network International, advisor to Syracuse University's Disability Cultural Center
- Satendra Singh – doctor with disability and founder of Enabling Unit
- Max Starkloff (1937–2010) – founded Paraquad, one of the first independent living centers in the United States; advocated for the Americans with Disabilities Act in 1990
- John Franklin Stephens – actor, athlete, and activist with Down syndrome
- Simon Stevens – disability issues consultant known for his high-profile work around disability issues in the UK

== T ==
- Joni Ericson Tada – evangelical Christian author, radio host, and founder of Joni and Friends, an organization "accelerating Christian ministry in the disability community"
- Sunaura Taylor – artist, writer, and activist
- Jack Thorne – English screenwriter and playwright
- Lauren Tuchman – first blind woman ordained as a rabbi and advocate for disability justice and inclusive Torah

== U ==
- Chris Underhill – a founder of Thrive and ADD International (Action on Disability and Development)

== V ==
- Susanna van Tonder – Luxembourgish disability-rights activist, patient advocate and blogger with multiple sclerosis
- George Veditz - former President of the National Association of the Deaf and advocate for the preservation of sign language
- Lizzie Velásquez – author and public speaker on themes of self-esteem and bullying of young people with disabilities
- Henry Viscardi Jr. – American disability-rights activist; advisor to eight US presidents on disability matters

== W ==
- Yuval Wagner – President of Access Israel
- Kat Watkins – Welsh disability rights activist and campaigner
- Ron Whyte – playwright who was on the President's Committee for the Employment of the Handicapped
- Alice Wong – founded the Disability Visibility Project
- Grace Woodhead – care in the community in 1890 in the UK
- Patrisha Wright – known as "the General" for her work in coordinating the campaign to enact the Americans with Disabilities Act

== Y ==
- Benafsha Yaqoobi – commissioner at the Afghan Independent Human Rights Commission (AIHRC) until she fled Afghanistan with her husband in 2021
- Cara Elizabeth Yar Khan – disability advocate, public speaker and United Nations humanitarian
- Emmanuel Ofosu Yeboah – Ghanaian cyclist with one leg who rode across Ghana to raise awareness and works to increase the number of wheelchairs in his country
- Stella Young (1982–2014) – Australian journalist, comedian, and disability activist, used a wheelchair for most of her life, editor of the ABC online magazine Ramp Up

== Z ==
- Frieda Zames – mathematics professor, writer and advocate for access to all aspects of public life, especially transportation; as an official of Disabled in Action, campaigned for wheelchair access on New York City buses, ferries and taxis and buildings like the Empire State Building; with her sister, Zames, wrote the book, The Disability Rights Movement: From Charity to Confrontation
- Maysoon Zayid – Palestinian actress, comedian, and disability rights activist known for her Ted Talk, "I've Got 99 Problems...Palsy is Just One"
- Hale Zukas – architectural and transportation barriers consultant, known for his pioneering work in Berkeley, California; lobbied for the creation and adoption of the Americans with Disabilities Act of 1990
