= Richard Donovan =

Richard Donovan may refer to:

- Richard Donovan (speed skater) (1901–1985), American speed skater
- Richard J. Donovan, member of the California legislature
- Dick Donovan (1927–1997), Major League Baseball pitcher
- Richard Donovan (runner) (born c. 1966), Irish runner and marathoner
- Richard II O'Donovan (died 1829), Irish general
- Rich Donovan, expert in business development issues surrounding disability and accessibility
- Richard Donovan (rugby union) (born 1963), Welsh rugby union player
- Richard Donovan (composer) (1891–1970), American composer and organist
