= Eyong =

Eyong can be both a masculine given name and a surname. Notable people with the name include:

- Eyong Enoh (born 1986), Cameroonian footballer
- Karl Etta Eyong (born 2003), Cameroonian footballer
- Lilian Dibo Eyong, Cameroonian wheelchair model
