= Disability and poverty =

People in poverty are significantly more likely to have or incur a disability within their lifetime compared to more financially privileged populations. The rate of disability within impoverished nations is notably higher than that found in more developed countries. Since the early 2010s there has been growing research in support of an association between disability and poverty and of a cycle by which poverty and disability are mutually reinforcing. Physical, cognitive, mental, emotional, sensory, or developmental impairments independently or in tandem with one another may increase one's likelihood of becoming impoverished, while living in poverty may increase one's potential of having or acquiring disability in some capacity.

== Extent ==
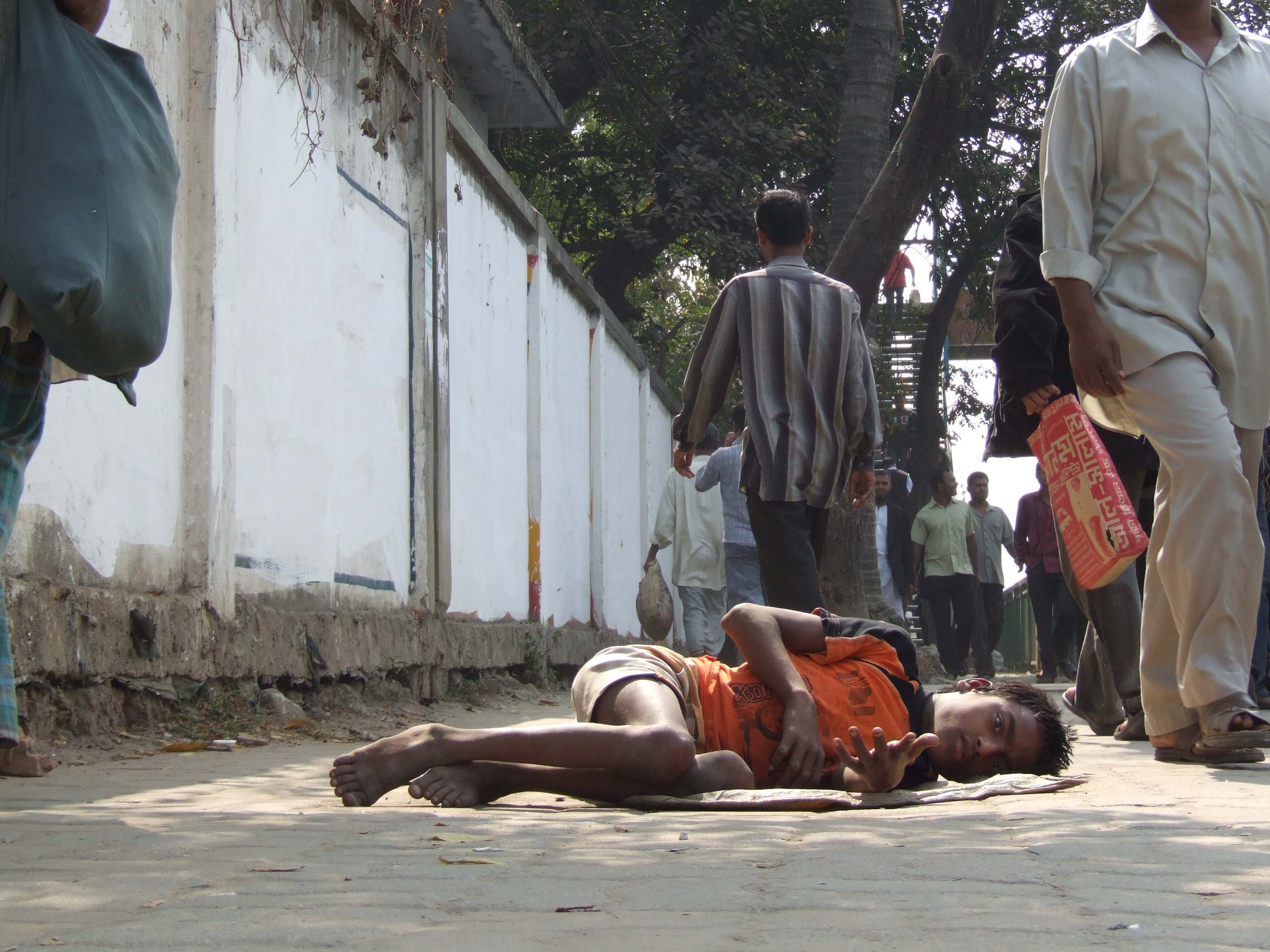
Man with disabilities in Bangladesh

A multitude of studies have been shown to demonstrate a significant rate of disability among individuals living in poverty. The evidence on the association between disability and poverty was recently reviewed in the United Nations' first Flagship Report on Disability and Development The association between disability and poverty has been shown to be stronger when poverty is measured multidimensionally as multiple deprivations compared to when it is measured through income or consumption expenditures. World Bank President James Wolfensohn has stated that this connection reveals a link that should be broken. He stated, "People with disabilities in developing countries are over-represented among the poorest people. They have been largely overlooked in the development agenda so far, but the recent focus on poverty reduction strategies is a unique chance to rethink and rewrite that agenda." The link between disability and development has been further stressed by Judith Heumann, the World Bank's first advisor for international disability rights, who indicated that of the 650 million people living with disabilities today eighty percent live in developing countries. Additionally, some research investigations with proved social impact are opening venues that lead to establish enabling factors to break the cycle of deprivation faced by poor people with disabilities. According to the United Kingdom Department for International Development, 10,000 individuals with disabilities die each day as a result of extreme poverty, showing that the connection between these two constructs is especially problematic and deep-seated. This connection is also present in developed countries, with the Disability Funders Network reporting that in the United States alone those with disabilities are twice as likely to live below the poverty line than those without disability.

== Causes ==
According to the World Bank, "Persons with disabilities on average as a group experience worse socioeconomic outcomes than persons without disabilities, such as less education, worse health outcomes, less employment, and higher poverty rates." Researchers have demonstrated that these reduced outcomes may be attributed to a myriad of institutional barriers and other factors. Furthermore, the prevalence of disabilities in impoverished populations has been predicted to follow a cyclical pattern by which those who live in poverty are more likely to acquire a disability and those who have a disability are more likely to become impoverished.

=== The vicious circle ===
Experts from the United Kingdom Disabled Persons Council attribute the connection between disability and poverty to many systemic factors that promote a "vicious circle". Statistics affirm the mutually reinforcing nature of disability and low socioeconomic status, showing that people with disabilities are significantly more likely to become impoverished and people who are impoverished are significantly more likely to become disabled. Barriers presented for those with disabilities can lead individuals to be deprived of access to essential resources, such as opportunities for education and employment, thus causing them to fall into poverty. Likewise, poverty places individuals at a much greater risk of acquiring a disability due to the general lack of health care, nutrition, sanitation, and safe working conditions that the poor are subject to.

Experts assert that this cycle is perpetuated mainly by the lack of agency afforded to those living in poverty. The few options available to the poor often necessitate that these individuals put themselves in harms way, consequently resulting in an increase in the acquisition of preventable impairments. Living in poverty is also shown to decrease an individual's access to preventive health services, which results in an increase in the acquisition of potentially preventable disabilities. In a study by Oxfam, the organization found that well over half of the instances of childhood blindness and hearing impairment in Africa and Asia were considered preventable or treatable. Another estimate released by Oxfam provides further evidence of this vicious circle. They found that 100 million people who in poverty also have impairments acquired due to malnutrition and lack of proper sanitation.

=== Discrimination ===
Prejudice held against individuals with disabilities, otherwise termed ableism, is shown to be a significant detriment to the successful outcomes of persons in this population. According to one study following the lives of children with disabilities in South Africa, the children in the sample described "discrimination from other children and adults in the community as their most significant daily problem." Additional forms of discrimination may lead disability to be more salient in already marginalized populations. Women and individuals belonging to certain ethnic groups who have disabilities have been found to more greatly suffer from discrimination and endure negative outcomes. Some researchers attribute this to what they believe is a "double rejection" of girls and women who are disabled on the basis of their sex in tandem with their disability.

The stereotypes that accompany both of these attributes lead females with disabilities to be seen as particularly dependent upon others and serve to amplify the misconception of this population as burdensome. In a study done by Oxfam, the societal consequences of having a disability while belonging to an already marginalized population were highlighted, stating,

"A disabled women suffers a multiple handicap. Her chances of marriage are very slight, and she is most likely to be condemned to a twilight existence as a non-productive adjunct to the household of her birth... it is small wonder that many disabled female babies do not survive."

Additionally, women with disabilities are particularly susceptible to abuse. A 2004 UN survey in Orissa, India, found that every women with disabilities in their sample had experienced some form of physical abuse. This double discrimination is also shown to be prevalent in more industrialized nations. In the United States, for example, 72 percent of women with disabilities live below the poverty line. The intensified discrimination individuals with disabilities may face due to their sex is especially important to consider when taking into account that, according to the Organisation for Economic Co-operation and Development, women report higher incidence of disability than men. Furthermore, the connection between disability and poverty holds particular significance for the world's women, with females accounting for roughly 70 percent of all individuals living in poverty. Institutional discrimination also exists as there are policies existing in organizations that result in inequality between a disabled person and non-disabled person. Some of these organizations systematically ignore the needs of disabled people and some interfere in their lives as a means of social control.

=== Health care ===
Another reason individuals living with disabilities are often impoverished is the high medical costs associated with their needs. One study, conducted in villages in South India, demonstrated that the annual cost of treatment and equipment needed for individuals with disabilities in the area ranged from three days of income to upwards of two years' worth, with the average amount spent on essential services totaling three months worth of income. This figure does not take into account the unpaid work of caregivers who must provide assistance after these procedures and the opportunity costs leading to a loss of income during injury, surgery, and rehabilitation. Studies reported by medical anthropologists Benedicte Ingstad and Susan Reynolds Whyte have also shown that access to medical care is significantly impaired when one lacks mobility. They report that in addition to the direct medical costs associated with disability, the burden of transportation falls most heavily on those with disabilities. This is especially true for the rural poor whose distance from urban environments necessitates extensive movement to obtain health services. Due to these barriers, both economic and physical, it is estimated that only 2 percent of individuals with disabilities have access to adequate rehabilitation services.

The inaccessibility of health care for those living in poverty has a substantial impact on the rate of disability within this population. Individuals living in poverty face higher health risks and are often unable to obtain proper treatment, leading them to be significantly more likely to acquire a disability within their lifetime. Financial barriers are not the only obstacles those living in poverty are confronted with. Research shows that matters of geographic inaccessibility, availability, and cultural limitations all provide substantial impediments to the acquisition of proper care for the populations of developing countries. Sex-specific ailments are particularly harmful for women living in poverty. The World Health Organization estimates that each year 20 million women acquire disabilities due to complications during pregnancy and childbirth that could be significantly mitigated with proper pre-natal, childbirth, and post-natal medical care.

=== Institutional barriers ===
Researchers assert that institutional barriers play a substantial role in the incidence of poverty in those with disabilities.

==== Accessibility ====
The accessibility of the physical environment may be a large determinant in one's ability to access ladders of success or even basic sustenance. Professor of urban planning Rob Imrie concluded that most spaces contain surmountable physical barriers that unintentionally create an "apartheid by design", whereby individuals with disabilities are excluded from areas because of the inaccessible layout of these spaces. This "apartheid" has been seen by some, such as the United Kingdom Disabled Persons Council, as especially concerning with regard to public transportation, education and health facilities, and perhaps most relevantly places of employment. Physical barriers are also commonly found in the home, with those in poverty more likely to occupy tighter spaces inaccessible to wheelchairs. Beyond physical accessibility, other potential excluding agents include a lack of braille, sign language and shortage of audio tape availability for those who are blind and deaf.

==== Education ====
The roots of unemployment are speculated to begin with discrimination at an early age. UNESCO reported in 1995 that 98 percent of children with disabilities in developing countries are denied access to formal education. This statistic is even more jarring for women with disabilities, with the United Nations Development Program reporting that the global literacy rate for this population is a mere 1 percent. This may be attributed to the fact that, according to the World Health Organization, boys with disabilities are significantly more likely to receive an education than similarly abled girls. Beyond simply the skills obtained, experts such as former World Bank advisor Judith Heumann speculate that the societal value of education and the inability of schools to accommodate special needs children substantially contributes to the discrimination of these individuals. The deprivation of education to individuals with special needs may not be solely an issue of discrimination, but an issue of resources. Children with disabilities often require special education resources and teaching practices largely unavailable in developing countries.

==== Employment ====
Some sociologists have found a number of barriers to employment for individuals with disabilities. These may be seen in employer discrimination, architectural barriers within the workplace, pervasive negative attitudes regarding skill, and the adverse reactions of customers. According to sociologist Edward Hall, "More disabled people are unemployed, in lower status occupations, on low earnings, or out of the labour market altogether, than non-disabled people." The International Labour Organization estimates that roughly 386 million of the world's working age population have some form of disability, however, up to eighty percent of these employable individuals with disabilities are unable to find work. For women with disabilities, the employment rate is even lower. Statistics show that individuals with disabilities in both industrialized and developing countries are generally unable to obtain formal work. In India, only 100,000 of the country's 70 million individuals with disabilities are employed. In the United States, 14.3 of a projected 48.9 million people with disabilities were employed, with two-thirds of those unemployed reporting that they were unable to find work. Similarly in Belgium, only 30 percent of persons with disabilities were able to find gainful employment. In the United Kingdom, 45 percent of adults with disabilities were found to live below the poverty line. Reliable data on the rate of unemployment for persons with disabilities has yet to be determined in most developing countries. Trends suggest that employment rate for persons with disability would continue to fall unless addressed with policies that consider such factors as technological progress and climate change.

Sociologists Colin Barnes and Geof Mercer demonstrated that this exclusion of persons with disabilities from the paid labor market is a primary reason why the majority of this population experiences far greater levels of poverty and are more reliant on the financial support of others. In addition to the economic gains associated with employment, researchers have shown that participation in the formal economic sector reduces discrimination of persons with disabilities. One anthropologist who chronicled the lives of persons with disabilities in Botswana noted that individuals who were able to find formal employment "will usually obtain a position in society equal to that of non-disabled citizens." Because the formal workplace is such a social space, the exclusion of individuals with disabilities from this realm is seen by some sociologists to be a significant impediment to social inclusion and equality.

Equity in employment has been strategized by some, such as sociologists Esther Wilder and William Walters, to depend on heightened awareness of current barriers, wider use of assistive technologies that can make workplaces and tasks more accessible, more accommodating job development, and most importantly deconstructing discrimination.

Creating inclusive employment that better facilitates the participation of individuals with disabilities is demonstrated to have a significantly positive impact on not only the lives of these individuals, but also the economies of nations who implement such measures. The International Labour Organization estimates that the current exclusion of employable individuals with disabilities is costing countries possible gains of 1 to 7 percent of their GDP.

== Implications ==
The relationship between disability and poverty is seen by many to be especially problematic given that it places those with the greatest needs in a position where they have access to the fewest resources. Researchers from the United Nations and the Yale School of Public Health refer to the link between disability and poverty as a manifestation of a self-fulfilling prophecy where the assumption that this population is a drain of resources leads society to deny them access to avenues of success. Such exclusion of individuals on the basis of their disability in turn denies them the opportunity to make meaningful contributions that disprove these stereotypes. Oxfam asserts that this negative cycle is largely due to a gross underestimation of the potential held by individuals with disabilities and a lack of awareness of the possibilities that each person may hold if the proper resources were present.

The early onset of preventable deaths has been demonstrated as a significant consequence of disability for those living in poverty. Researchers show that families who lack adequate economic agency are unable to care for children with special medical needs, resulting in preventable deaths. In times of economic hardship studies show families may divert resources from children with disabilities because investing in their livelihood is often perceived as an investment caretakers cannot afford to make. Benedicte Ingstad, an anthropologist who studied families with a member with disabilities, asserted that what some may consider neglect of individuals with disabilities "was mainly a reflection of the general hardship that the household was living under." A study conducted by Oxfam found that the rejection of a child with disabilities was not uncommon in areas of extreme poverty. The report went on to show that neglect of children with disabilities was far from a deliberate choice, but rather a consequence of a lack of essential resources. The study also demonstrated that services necessary to the well-being of these children "are seized upon" when they are made available. The organization thus concludes that if families had the capacity to care for disabled children they would do so willingly, but often the inability to access crucial resources bars them from administering proper care.

== Current initiatives ==
Initiatives on the local, national, and transnational levels addressing the connection between poverty and disability are exceedingly rare. According to the UN, only 45 countries throughout the world have anti-discrimination and other disability-specific laws. Additionally, experts point to the Western world as a demonstration that the association between poverty and disability is not naturally dissolved through the development process. Instead, a conscious effort toward inclusive development is seen by theorists, such as Disability Policy expert Mark Priestley, as essential in the remediation process.

Disability rights advocate James Charlton asserts that it is crucial to better incorporate the voices of individuals with disabilities into the decision-making process. His literature on disability rights made popular the slogan, "Nothing about us without us", evidencing the need to ensure those most affected by policy have an equitable hand in its creation. This need for agency is an issue particularly salient for disabled people who are often negatively stereotyped as dependent upon others. Furthermore, many who are part of the disability rights movement argue that there is too little emphasis on aid designed to eliminate the physical and social barriers those with disabilities face. The movement asserts that unless these obstacles are rectified, the connection between disability and poverty will persist.

Employment is seen as a critical agent in reducing stigma and increasing capacity in the lives of individuals with disabilities. The lack of opportunities currently available is shown to perpetuate the vicious cycle, causing individuals with disabilities to fall into poverty. To address these concerns many recent initiatives have begun to develop more inclusive employment structures. One example of this is the Ntiro Project for Supported and Inclusive Employment. Located in South Africa, the project aims to eliminate the segregationist models prevalent in the country through coordinated efforts between districts, NGOs, and community organizations. The model stresses education and pairs individuals with intellectual disabilities with mentors until they have developed the skills necessary to perform their roles independently. The program then matches individuals with local employers. This gradualist model ensures that people who may have been deprived of the resources necessary to acquire essential skills are able to build their expertise and enter the workforce.

The United Nations has been at the forefront of initiating legislation that aims to deter the current toll disabilities take on individuals in society, especially those in poverty. In 1982 the UN published the World Programme of Action Concerning Disabled Persons, which explicitly states "Particular efforts should be made to integrate the disabled in the development process and that effective measures for prevention, rehabilitation and equalization of opportunities are therefore essential." This doctrine set stage for the UN Decade of the Disabled Person from 1983 to 1992, where, at its close, the General Assembly adopted the Standard Rules of the Equalization of Opportunities for Persons with Disabilities. The Standard Rules encourages states to remove social, cultural, economic, educational, and political barriers that bar individuals with disabilities from participating equally in society. Proponents claim that these movements on behalf of the UN helped facilitate more inclusive development policy and brought disability rights to the forefront.

== Criticisms ==
Critics assert that the relationship between disability and poverty may be overstated. Cultural differences in the definition of disability, bias leading to more generous estimates on behalf of researchers, and the variability in incidences that are not accounted for between countries are all speculated to be part of this mischaracterization.

These factors lead some organizations to conclude that the projection asserting 10 percent of the global population belongs to the disability community is entirely too broad. Speculation over the projection of a 10 percent disability rate has led other independent studies to collect varying results. The World Health Organization updated their estimate to 4 percent for developing countries and 7 percent for industrialized countries. USAID maintains the initial 10 percent figure, while the United Nations works off half of that rate with a projection of 5 percent. The percentage of the world's population with disabilities remains a highly contested matter. The most recent estimates on global prevalence for adults stand at about 15 percent.

The argument that development should be channeled to better the agency of individuals with disabilities has been contested on several grounds. First, critics argue that development is enacted to harness potential that most individuals in this population do not possess. Second, the case that health care costs for disabled people are simply too great to be shouldered by the government or NGOs has been made, especially with regard to emerging economies. Furthermore, there is no guarantee that investing in an individual's rehabilitation will result in substantial change in their agency. Lastly is the proposition of priorities. It is argued that most countries in need of extensive development must focus on health ails such as infant mortality, diarrhea, and malaria that are widespread killers not limited to a specific population.

Critique with respect to potential solutions has also been made. In regards to implementing change through policy, critics have noted that the weak legal standing of United Nations' documents and the lack of resources available to aid in their implementation have resulted in a struggle to achieve the goals set forth by the General Assembly. Other studies have shown that policy on a national level has not necessarily equated to marked improvements within these countries. One such example is the United States where sociologists Esther Wilder and William Walters purport that "the employment of disabled individuals has increased only marginally since the Americans with Disabilities Act was passed." The smaller than anticipated impact of the Americans with Disabilities Act and other policy-based initiatives is seen as a critical flaw in legislation. This is because many issues surrounding disability, namely employment discrimination, are generally reconciled through the legal system necessitating that individuals engage in the often expensive process of litigation.

== See also ==
- Convention on the Rights of Persons with Disabilities
- Disability rights movement
- Disability studies
- Diseases of poverty
- Invisible disability
- Social justice
- Special education
- World report on disability
