= Shahar Botzer =

Israeli venture capitalist

- שחר בוצר
- Born: July 2, 1982 (age 44); Israel
- Occupations: Entrepreneur, activist
- Known for: Co-founding "Good Company", promoting disability rights in Israel

Shahar Botzer (Hebrew: שחר בוצר; born July 2, 1982) is the co-founder and managing partner of "Good Company", a purpose driven venture capital fund. Former managing partner of the impact investing fund, 2B-Community, and former chair of the Issta Lines Group. Botzer also served as the CEO of Shaham – National Actors' Association, deputy chair of the National Union of Israeli Students and chair of the Student Union of the Tel Aviv University. Botzer, who was born with muscular dystrophy and gets around with a wheelchair, proposed the "Botzer Bill" which constituted a breakthrough for the rights of people with disabilities and accessibility in Israel, and was the first person in Israel with a congenital disability to be elected in a direct election to head a public body not connected to the rights and struggle of people with disabilities.

== Biography ==
Botzer was born in 1982, the eldest son of David (formerly a professional military officer and currently a lawyer) and Leah (formerly Deputy Chief of Mental Health Services in the Ministry of Health and currently administrative director of Sha'ar Menashe Mental Health Center), and an older brother to Tal and Or.

He was born with muscular dystrophy, which manifests in under-functional limbs, and an inability to stand. Since childhood, he has been mobile using a motorized wheelchair. In the 1980s, his family lived in the Ramat Eshkol neighborhood of Jerusalem. In 1991, the family moved to the communal settlement of Maccabim-Reut. The settlement was then in its infancy and the public buildings were planned to be wheelchair accessible. The school he attended was not fully accessible and after his parents submitted several complaints and received no response, Botzer proposed a bill, with assistance from the organization Bizchut, entitled Shahar Botzer vs. Local Council Maccabim-Reut. Botzer was represented before the High Court by his father, who was not yet a lawyer. The High Court panel, headed by then Supreme Court President Aharon Barak, accepted his petition. In his ruling in 1996, Justice Barak stated: “The petitioner is not requesting charity, but rather is seeks to realize his rights...Ensuring equal opportunities for people with disabilities costs money. A society established on the principles of human dignity, freedom and equality is willing to cover the necessary costs.”

Following the ruling, all schools in Israel were required to provide accessibility for people with disabilities. In addition, this ruling served as the basis for the proposed Bill of Equal Rights for Persons with Disabilities, which was later approved by the Knesset. The Botzer Bill is currently taught in schools that award professional degrees in law, social work and education.

Botzer set another precedent when he requested permission to learn to drive at age 17, just like other Israeli youth. He was supposed to learn to drive using a specially-adapted car for people with wheelchairs, but according to the National Insurance regulations then in force, persons with disabilities could learn to drive only from 18 years of age. Following Botzer's request the regulations were changed so that people with disabilities could begin to learn to drive at the age of 17, just like the general population.

After graduating from high school in Maccabim-Reut, and despite being exempted from conscription to the IDF, Botzer volunteered for military service at the Israel Defense Forces and was assigned to the computer unit of the Home Front Command. He completed his military service and even served several additional months of professional military service.

After completing military service Botzer began studying at Tel Aviv University. At first, he studied accounting, but after a year and a half switched to economics and communications. In his freshman year he became involved in the "New Generation" students' union, affiliated with the Labor Party, and the Students' Union of Tel Aviv University, where he served as chairman of the finance committee, head of public relations and vice-chairman. On September 21, 2009, he was elected chairman of the students' union, and thus became the first person in Israel with a congenital disability to be elected in a private and direct election as the head of a public entity unrelated to the rights and struggle of people with disabilities. In September 2010, he was elected deputy chairman of the National Union of Israeli Students. In March 2011 he was appointed CEO of Shaham – National Actors’ Association. In September 2014, he completed his role at Shaham and was appointed CEO of 2B-Community, the impact investing fund. In October 2015 he became a managing partner of 2B-Community. From May 2013 to May 2017 he served concurrently as Chairman of the Issta Lines Group. In 2017 he was chosen by Globes magazine as one of Israel's 40 most young and promising men and women. In November 2020 he became a managing partner of "Good Company", a purpose driven venture capital fund. "Good Company" was Co-Founded by Botzer and his Partner Ido Fishler, investing in early-stage companies that leverage software centric technologies to solve the world's biggest problems: Future of work, Digital health, Future of Energy, Circular economy, Agriculture.
