= Andrew Batavia =

Disability rights activist

Andrew I. Batavia
- Born: June 15, 1957; Brooklyn, New York, US
- Died: January 6, 2003 (aged 45); Miami, Florida, US
- Education: Harvard Law School, Stanford University Medical School, University of California, Riverside
- Known for: Disability rights activist; author on disability rights, health care policy and finance, assisted dying, independent living movement; drafted regulations for the Americans with Disabilities Act of 1990, Title III; co-founder of Autonomy, Inc.; filed U.S. and Florida supreme court amicus briefs on assisted dying
- Political party: Independent, Republican; Bull Moose Party
- Spouse: Cheryl Batavia
- Children: 2
- Awards: Chancellor's Award, University of California, Riverside (1995), White House Fellowship (1990-91), Distinguished Handicapped American (1988), Mary E. Switzer Distinguished Research Fellowship (1986-87)

Andrew ("Drew") I. Batavia (June 15, 1957 – January 6, 2003) was a disability rights activist, health policy researcher, author, and associate professor at Florida International University who, at the age of 16, sustained a spinal cord injury. He earned a JD from Harvard Law School and an MS in health services research from Stanford University Medical School, and as a White House Fellow (1990) worked under Attorney General Dick Thornburgh to draft regulations for the Americans with Disabilities Act. In 2002, he co-founded Autonomy, Inc., to represent persons with disabilities who wanted choices and control over their lives, including the choice to end it for those with disabilities who were terminally ill.

== Early life ==
Batavia was born at Beth-El Hospital (now Brookdale) in Brooklyn and lived in the Italian-Jewish neighborhood of Bensonhurst on 80th street until he was eight years old. In 1966, the family moved to Yonkers, New York, where he attended fourth grade at Public School 21. Later he attended Lincoln High School and in May 1973, at age 15, completed the Yonkers Marathon.

== Car accident and physical rehabilitation ==
In the summer of 1973, at age 16, Batavia was hired as a camp counselor for children with intellectual disabilities at Camp Lee Mar in Lackawaxen, Pennsylvania. On a day off from work in early August, he went to Monticello with two other counselors. At the end of the day, they hitchhiked back to camp. The car that picked them up crashed, and Batavia flew through the front windshield, breaking his neck. He was transported to Wayne County Memorial Hospital in Honesdale, Pennsylvania, but after initial care, he was transferred in mid-August to Montefiore Medical Center in the Bronx, where his spinal cord injury (at the C2-C3 level) could be better managed. In 1974, following his acute care at Montefiore, he was admitted for physical rehabilitation to the Rusk Institute of Rehabilitation Medicine in the city of New York for almost a year. He was later discharged with a wheelchair to his home in Yonkers, New York, where he completed his senior year at Lincoln High School (1974–75), and was elected co-president of his senior class.

== Higher education ==
On graduating high school, Batavia matriculated at the University of California, Berkeley, which had a program for disabled students. After one year, he transferred to Strawberry Creek College, a smaller division of the university, which offered a more personal educational experience. The following year he transferred to UC Riverside, which offered a more wheelchair-accessible campus, and majored in both economics and sociology. After receiving a BS at Riverside, Batavia attended Harvard Law School for two years. The following summer, he interned as an associate at the Wall Street firm Fried, Frank, Harris, Shriver & Jacobson. After two years at Harvard, he took a leave to get an MS degree in health services research at Stanford Medical School (1980-1983), where he studied under Victor Fuchs and Alain Enthoven. While at Stanford, he joined and served as president of the Stanford Disabled Students to address disability policy issues at the campus. Batavia then completed his final year of law school at Stanford (1983-1984) while still receiving his JD degree from Harvard Law School in 1984.

== Initial career ==
Batavia's first job after law school was in the office of the general counsel at the Department of Health and Human Services (HHS), where he promulgated regulations, reviewed proposals, and litigated. After two years working for HHS, he left and joined the National Rehabilitation Hospital (now Medstar) as associate director of health services research under Gerben Dejong in Washington, D.C. (1987-1989). In 1986–87, he was funded as a Mary E. Switzer Research Fellow and started his career as a health policy researcher, publishing, together with Gerben, in the area of rehabilitation.

== White House Fellowship ==
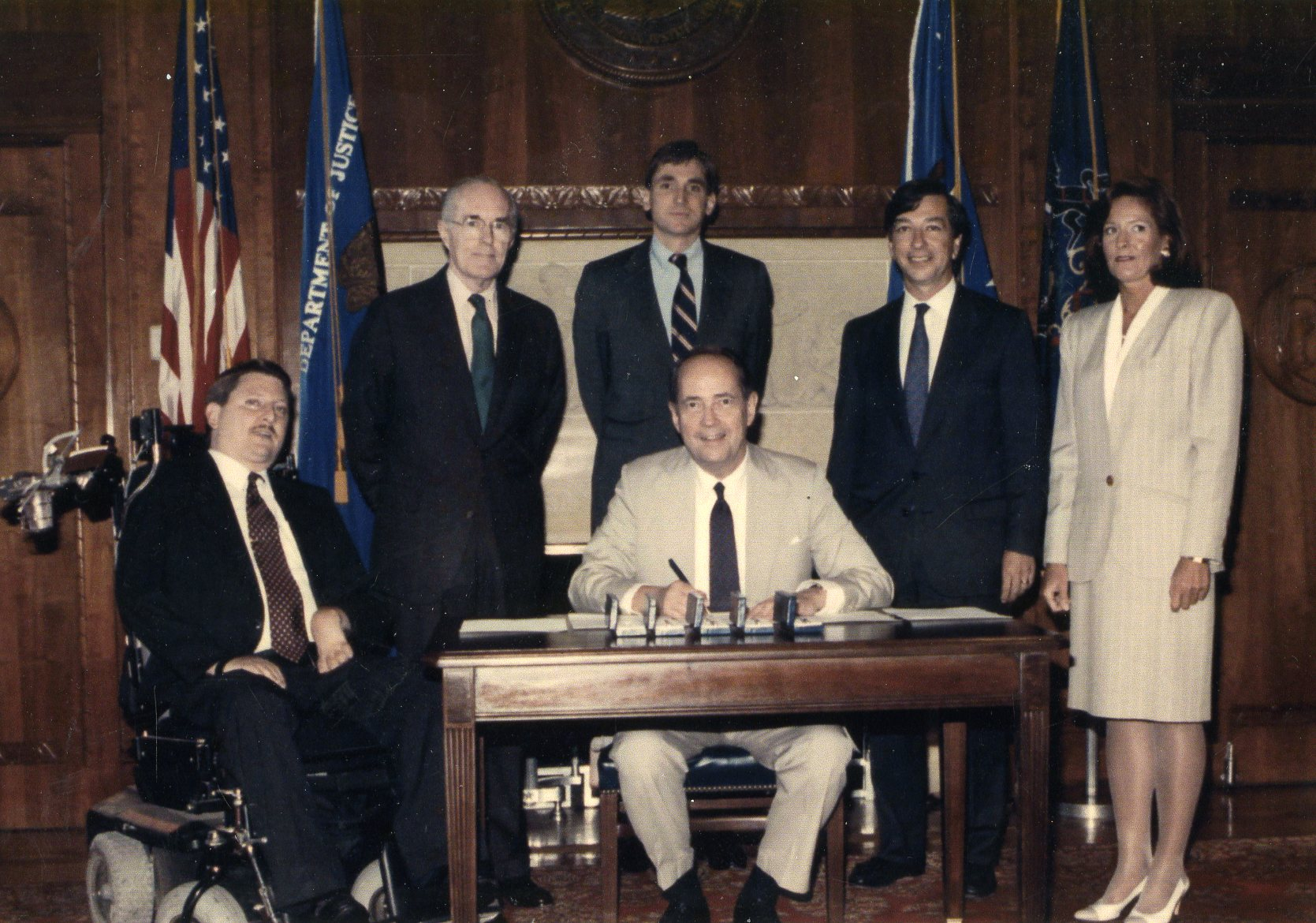
1991 signing of the ADA regulations by U.S. Attorney General Dick Thornburgh (Andrew I Batavia on left side of photo)

Batavia was one of twelve White House Fellows selected for the 1990–91 period. He served as special assistant to Attorney General Richard Thornburgh, writing regulations to effectuate the implementation of the Americans with Disabilities Act (ADA) of 1990.

== Government and policy work ==
Following the WHF, Batavia accepted a position as senior staffer on the Domestic Policy Council in the White House (1991-1992), under President George H. W. Bush, where he wrote a proposal for national universal health care. In 1992, he served a year as research director for disability and rehabilitation policy at ABT Associates, Inc., in Bethesda, Maryland (1992-1993) and later, he served as executive director at the National Council on Disability (1993). From 1993 to 1995, Batavia served as a legislative assistant to Senator John McCain of Arizona, where he focused on domestic economic and health policy issues.

== Miami Herald columnist ==
In 1992, Batavia and his longtime personal assistant, Cheryl Nicholson, were married at their home in Washington, D.C. In 1995, they moved to Miami Beach, where Batavia wrote a column about disability issues for the Miami Herald. They adopted a Russian brother and sister, Joe and Katey, in 1996.

== Involvement in assisted-dying debate ==
While working as counsel at the law firm McDermott Will & Emery from 1995 to 1997, he filed amicus briefs and served as the attorney of record to protect the rights of individuals who were terminally ill and who wished assistance to end their lives. Batavia served as co-counsel on the brief amici on behalf of Autonomy, Inc. in the Supreme Court of the United States case of Oregon v. Ashcroft in 2002, and in the appeal to the Ninth Circuit Court of Appeals. He also served as attorney of record on the brief amici in Washington v. Glucksberg, and Vacco v. Quill before the U.S. Supreme Court in 1996, as well as on the brief amici for Krischer v. McIver in the Supreme Court of Florida in 1997.

== University teaching ==
Batavia joined Florida International University (FIU) in September 1997 as an associate professor of health care law and policy (1997-2002) in the School of Policy and Management, where his main office was located on North Miami's Biscayne campus. There, he continued to publish articles and the book Independent Living: A Viable Option for Long-Term Care, which described three models of care for persons with disabilities.

== Autonomy, Inc. ==
In 2002, he became president and cofounded with Hugh Gallagher, Autonomy, Inc., a not-for-profit organization to represent people with disabilities who wanted choices and control over their lives, including the choice to end it for persons with disabilities who were terminally ill.

== Death ==
Batavia died at Jackson Memorial Hospital in Florida, on January 6, 2003, from sepsis, at age 45. His memorial service was held a week later at Beth Israel Memorial Chapel in Delray Beach. He was awarded tenure and posthumously promoted to full professor in January 2003.

== Memoirs ==
In 2015, fourteen chapters of Batavia's unfinished memoir were discovered on a hard drive. The family completed the memoir, which Batavia had titled Wisdom from a Chair. In the preface, Batavia wrote his life's mission:

My mission in this world is to try to ensure that all people, including people with disabilities, have greater choices in and control over their lives. I believe that achieving this mission will make the world a slightly better place than it was before I got here. p. xvii
