= Abia Akram =

Pakistani disability rights activist

Abia Akram (Urdu: ابیہ اکرم; born c. 1985) is a Pakistani disability rights activist. She is the founder of an organisation called National Forum of Women with Disabilities in Pakistan, and a leading figure within the disability rights movement in the country as well as in Asia and the Pacific. She was named as one of the BBC's 100 Women in 2021. Her brother, Muhammad Atif Sheikh, is also a disability rights activist.

== Life ==
Abia Akram was born in Pakistan and grew up with her parents and siblings in Islamabad. She was born with the genetic form of rickets, due to which she uses a wheelchair. She began her education at an education centre for people with disabilities, before she started to attend a mainstream school, from which she graduated with the highest honours. The time at the mainstream school made her realize the lack of knowledge among teachers, and the importance of systematic training of teachers. In 1997 she got involved in disabled people's organizations, and founded the National Forum of Women with Disabilities, in order to work for a change. She got involved in Handicap International, and founded what is called the Ageing and Disability Task Force, which is a coalition of twelve organizations that all work for a mainstreaming of concerns around ageing and disability across humanitarian agencies. During the 2010 Pakistan floods, Akram played a central role as coordinator for the Ageing and Disability Task Force to make sure that disability inclusiveness was a part of the UN Humanitarian Emergency Response in the country.

Akram is recognized as a leading figure within the disability rights movement in as well Pakistan as Asia and the Pacific. She is the head and founder of the National Forum of Women with Disabilities in Pakistan. She is also founding member and coordinator of the Special Talent Exchange Program (STEP) and the Asia Pacific Women with Disabilities United (APWWDU). On top of this, she is the chair of the UNICEF Global Partnership for Children with Disabilities, and the Women's Coordinator of Disabled Peoples' International in the Asia-Pacific region. She was also the first woman from Pakistan, as well as the first woman with disabilities, to be nominated to Commonwealth Young Disabled People's Forum's coordinator.

She received a Master of Arts in Gender and International Development from the University of Warwick in England in 2011. She has also conducted research work in Japan. She was the first woman with a disability from Pakistan to get a Chevening Scholarship. She was named as one of the BBC's 100 Women in 2021.
