= World Youth Student and Educational Travel Confederation =

The World Youth Student and Educational Travel Confederation was formed in 2006. It has a network of 5000 locations in 118 countries.

The International Student Travel Confederation was a non-profit organisation founded in 1949 with a goal to secure and inform students of cheaper and or tax free travel. Working in more than 100 countries. It merged with the Federation of Youth Travel Organisation in 2006 to form a new organisation based in Amsterdam.

== Local Associations that belong to ISIC (partial list) ==
- Argentina: ASATEJ
- Australia: STA Travel
- Belarus: Youth Travel Centre
- Belgium: Connections
- Brazil: STB Student Travel Bureau
- Peru: ISIC - INTEJ
- Canada: Canadian Federation of Students-Services (CFS-Services)
- Denmark: STA Travel Denmark
- France: Wasteels Voyages
- India: STIC Travels
- Israel: Issta
- Japan: University Coop. Federation
- Lebanon: Campus Travel
- Mexico: SETEJ Mexico A.C.
- New Zealand: STA Travel
- Poland: Almatur
- South Africa: STA Travel
- United Kingdom: STA Travel
