= Noor Al Mazroei =

Qatari chef and activist

- نور المزروعي
- Citizenship: Qatar
- Education: Qatar University
- Occupation: Chef
- Employer: Consultant chef

Noor Al Mazroei (Arabic: نور المزروعي) is a chef and disability rights activist from Qatar, who is an expert on Qatar's culinary heritage. Her specialty is adapting traditional Qatari recipes to provide gluten-free and vegan alternatives. She is a chef at Rosado Café and was taught to cook as a child by her mother and grandmother.

In 2021, she collaborated with Park Hyatt Doha to launch a festive cake for Ramadan. In 2022, she guided David Beckham through Qatar's markets as part of his promotional work for Qatar Tourism.

Prior to her culinary career, Al Mazroei was director of a disability service and continues to campaign for increased rights and representation for disabled people. She has an MA in special needs education, as well as a BA in management information systems, both from Qatar University.
