= Frank Larkin =

Irish disability rights activist (1972–2020)

- Born: 1972
- Died: 27 March 2020 (aged 47–48)
- Known for: Disability rights activism
- Spouse: Pauline
- Children: None
- Parents: Frank Snr (father); Brighdin (mother)

Frank Larkin (1972 – 27 March 2020) was an Irish disability rights activist. He was one of the most prominent such figures in his country.

== Biography ==
Larkin was born with the birth defect spina bifida. He stated that his "will to campaign" came from "the frustrations I experience relating to having a disability".

He ran for Letterkenny Town Council as a Fine Gael candidate in the 2009 elections, but was unsuccessful.

He attended a hearing on disability issues at the European Parliament in 2012. Larkin was elected chairperson of his country's national campaign for disabilities in 2013.

He was one of twenty participants from fourteen different countries chosen to attend a conference in Budapest in March 2014.

In 2015, Larkin became involved in a dispute with Facebook over posts it decided were not offensive, among which was an advertisement for a spina bifida doll that encouraged the buyer to abuse it. He thought about deleting his account but instead he led a petition against the posts, which was ultimately successful.

In 2016, Larkin became involved in a dispute with the makers of Coronation Street over the language used by character David Platt to his grandmother Audrey Roberts in an episode of the TV series. Also that year, he worked on an accessibility guide for his local area.

He represented his country at the European Network for Independent Living in Brussels in 2019.

Larkin was a sports enthusiast who followed the English association football team Liverpool.

Among the issues he spoke out against were being sent two tickets for each football game he attended, one of which he had to pay for and intended for a companion which he did not need; illegal parking in disabled spaces; measures imposed by government on disabled people; discrimination by taxi drivers; and securing parking spaces outside court for disabled people.

Larkin died suddenly in hospital in 2020 at the age of 48. He had been active in calling for disability access to polling stations in the weeks before his death. Days before he died, he had been admiring the weather. He was survived by his wife Pauline, his mother Brighdin, his father Frank Snr and his siblings: Louise, Geraldine, Olga, Sharon, Linda, Paul and Gareth.

== See also ==
- List of disability rights activists
