= Cara Elizabeth Yar Khan =

Indian disability advocate

Cara Yar Khan
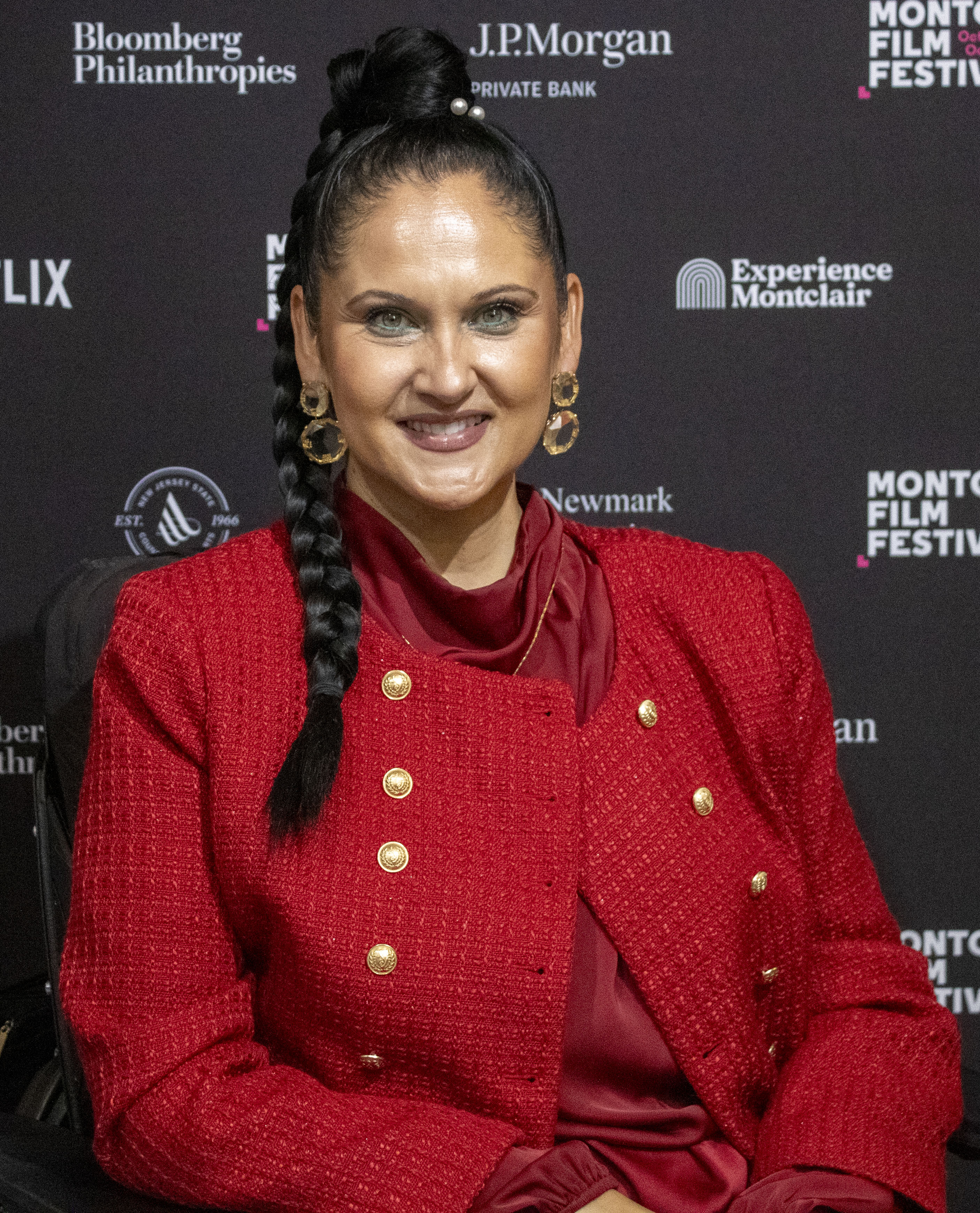
- Yar Khan at the Montclair Film Festival in 2024
- Born: Hyderabad, India
- Education: University of Guelph (BA); Johns Hopkins University (MPP)
- Website: www.carayarkhan.com

Cara Elizabeth Yar Khan is a disability advocate, public speaker and United Nations humanitarian.

Yar Khan was born in Hyderabad, India to an Indian father and English mother, and was raised in Canada.

Her interest in humanitarianism began while watching a telethon to raise money for children in Africa, when she was six years old.

== Education and career ==
Yar Khan studied at the University of Guelph, earning a B.A. in international development, before attending Paul H. Nitze School of Advanced International Studies in Italy. After graduating college, earning her master's in public policy, she travelled in 2001 with the United Nations World Food Programme to Ecuador to begin her career as a humanitarian. For 15 years she worked in different humanitarian roles in 10 different countries, including work as a fundraising officer and child protection specialist for UNICEF.

In 2007, at age 30, Yar Khan was diagnosed with the rare muscle-wasting disease hereditary inclusion body myopathy. While at first she hid her diagnosis, fearing people would begin to doubt her capabilities, she began to open up as the disease progressed. She was advised to quit her career to go home and move in with her parents upon her diagnosis, but instead continued working, travelling to Angola with UNICEF. The next year, when Yar Khan travelled to China as member of the 2008 Sichuan earthquake emergency response, she needed the use of a leg brace. Two years later, in 2010, she used two canes and two leg braces on a humanitarian trip to Haiti in response to the earthquake.

Currently, Yar Khan works at the International Human Trafficking Institute, part of the National Center for Civil and Human Rights in Atlanta.

In 2019, she gave a TED Talk discussing the importance of courage and fear coexisting together.

== Achievements and awards ==
Yar Khan began horseback riding in 2014, and was recognized as the Professional Association of Therapeutic Horsemanship International's 2015 Adult Equestrian of the Year. To demonstrate two common themes from her public speaking career, courage and fear, Yar Khan embarked on a 12-day trip at the Grand Canyon, including four days spent descending the area on horseback and another eight days white water rafting in the Colorado River.

In 2015, she was given the Driving Force Award by Porsche North America and the National Center for Civil and Human Rights, for her activism and community engagement.

Atlanta magazine named Yar Khan as one of their Women Making A Mark, in 2018. That same year, she was honored with an Outstanding Voice Award from the Atlanta Business Chronicle for advancing equality in the business community in Atlanta.

As of July 2022, a documentary about Yar Khan, called Her Inescapable Brave Mission, created with filmmaker Sam Pollard and executive producer Brenda Robinson, was in the works.

== See also ==
- List of disability rights activists
