= Jyothirgamaya Foundation =

Blindness organization based in India

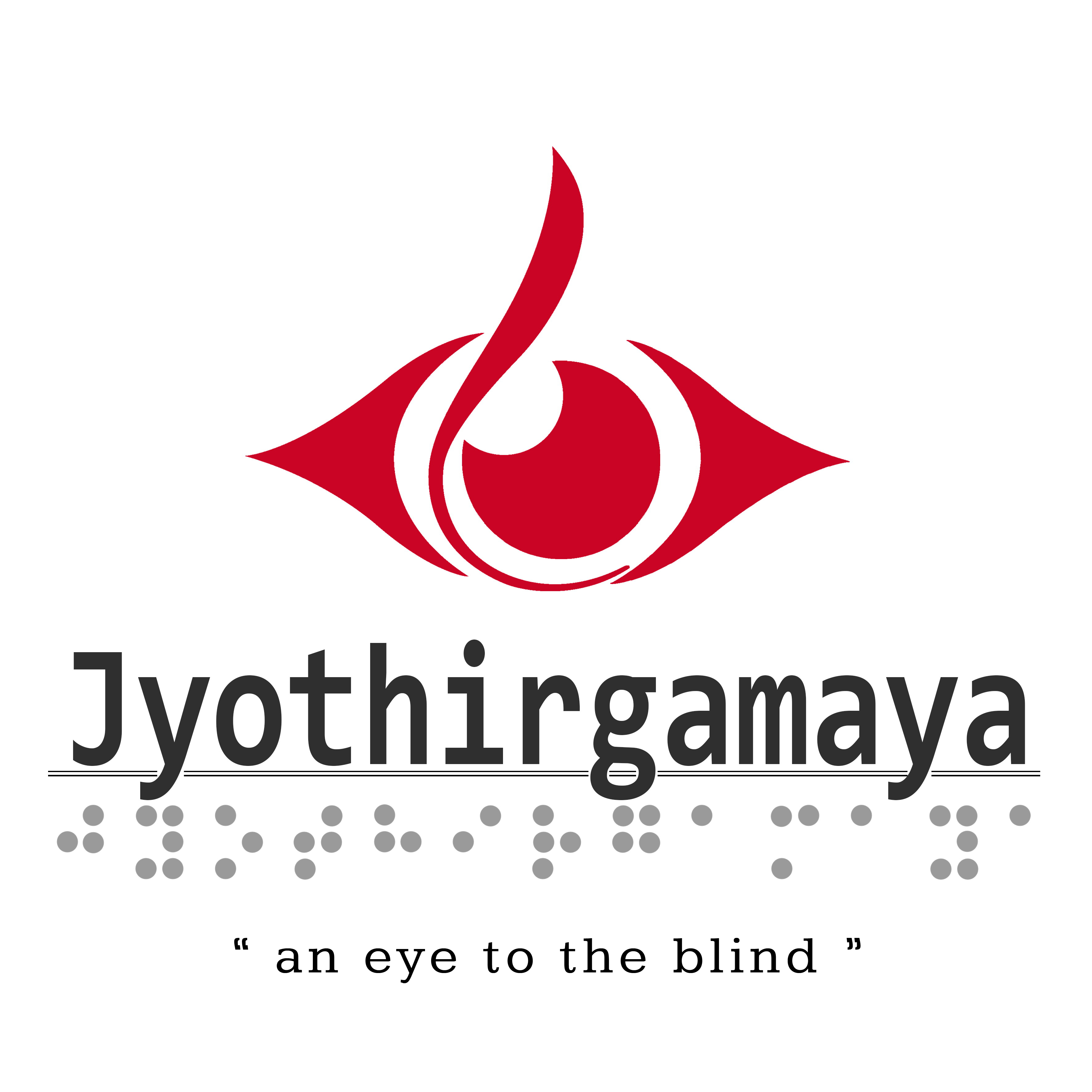
- Founded: 2015
- Founder: Ms. Tiffany Brar
- Type: Non-Governmental Organisation
- Purpose: Visual impairment, Disability
- Location: Trivandrum, Kerala, India
- Award: Kerala State Award from Chief Minister
- Website: www.jyothirgamayaindia.org

Jyothirgamaya Foundation is a nonprofit organization, based in Thiruvananthapuram Kerala which is actively involved in the empowerment of persons with visual impairment founded in 2015 by Tiffany Brar. The project started as a mobile blind school in 2012. Tiffany Brar (visually impaired) herself, traveled through rural areas in public transport in search of blind people of all ages in rural areas in India, with the aim of bringing out of the four walls of their house, to which they are confined, and brings a new light to their eyes, which has nothing to do with their eyesight. Jyothirgamaya Foundation holds Special consultative status with United Nations.

== Jyothirgamaya, the word ==
Jyothirgamaya(ज्योतिर्गमय) is a Sanskrit word which means leading to the light. The philosophy behind this concept of leading to a light, is to bring the blind who are confined within their homes, out and give them a healthy exposure to the outside world, and enlighten them in various fields, so that they may not be in a world of darkness, but become well informed productive citizens.

== History ==
Jyothirgamaya Foundation was first started as a mobile blind school, with the philosophy, that "if blind cannot go to school, let the school go to them" and with this innovative idea a converted rickshaw is hired to carry computer, printer, Braille slates and white canes to homes of the blind students across the city of Trivandrum. Tiffany went from house to house in public transport with her white cane seeking the blind and trying to rehabilitate them, integrate them, and bring them to the forefront of society.

== Founder ==
Tiffany Brar, born on 14 September 1988. She became blind due to carelessness of her doctor, as she had a retinal disease. She lost her sight six months after birth due to oxygen overdose, due to constant battles of discrimination and stigmatization on account of her disability, decided to attempt in making a small difference in the lives of her blind colleagues, and so with the knowledge she possessed she started the Jyothirgamaya Foundation to bring her community to the forefront. However, as her father was an Indian military officer she had the opportunity to travel to many places due to postings of her father and being visually impaired verbal communication was necessary and in this process she became multilingual as she learned to speak five Indian languages fluently in her childhood. She did her education in special schools and military schools which were not equipped to handle blind students like her. She continued her studies in Mary Scot Homes for the Blind, Darjeeling, after completion of her primary education in Kerala as her father was transferred there. She pursued her degree in English Literature from the Government Women's College, Thiruvananthapuram, in 2006 after completion of her schooling and after graduating in 2009, she started working with an organisation called Braille without Borders.

== The Approach ==
Tiffany Brar receiving National Award from the Honourable President of India, Dr. Ram Nath Kovind

Over the years, Jyothirgamaya has adopted a need-based approach, where participants aged 10 to forty, are trained in accordance with their needs, skills, and capability. As she travelled to various organisations she observed many visually impaired people confined to their homes as they lacked skills and training and this motivated her to start the Jyothirgamaya Foundation which provides training in computers as well as the use of the internet, social media, Braille, basic Maths, English communication, life skills including personal hygiene and grooming and mobility training. The main part of teaching is using white canes for children as many of them are dependent on others. Till year 2018 the organisation had trained more than 300 blind people in activities relating to daily living, mobility, the realms of access technology and interpersonal skills through camps. In the year 2019, the organisation introduced vocational training like basket weaving, making dream catchers and others. Additionally, the organisation also offers English language sessions, blind yoga sessions with International instructors and also a lot of representatives and volunteers from companies also take soft-skill and interpersonal skills classes. The organisation had also designed residential programmes incl food and accommodation, with a duration of 4–5 months of 4 batches with a maximum of 8-10 students in each batch, participating in a year and has trained over 1100 students. The organisation also reached out to their students for online training courses for subjects like Advanced Android Learning and also to connected families for support with food and regular needs. The foundation is also working to sensitise schools and colleges about promoting disability rights and make them aware about the needs of disabled students in addition to collaborating with Social Justice Department about updates to be made in the legal structure to accommodate the needs of disabled people.

== Advocacy ==
Jyothirgamaya advocates for rights for persons with disabilities, and creating an accessible environment for them and raising awareness among the general public towards disabilities.

== Awards and recognition ==
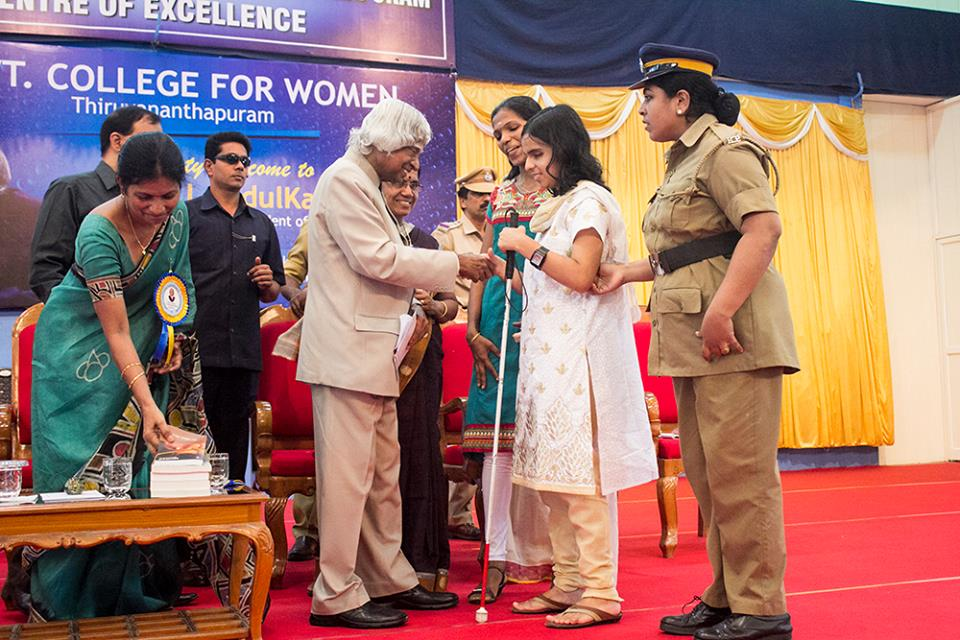
Tiffany Brar with former President of India Dr. APJ. Abdul Kalam in 2012

- Make a Difference Award from Rotary International
- Vocational Excellence Award from Rotary International
- Received Kerala State Award for Best Institution for the empowerment of Persons with Disabilities from the Chief Minister of Kerala Mr. Pinarayi Vijayan In 2019
- The Spindle Award, 2019
- Special consultative status from United Nations, 2020

== See also ==
- Kalvialaya
