= Jean-Christophe Parisot =

French political scientist (1967–2020)

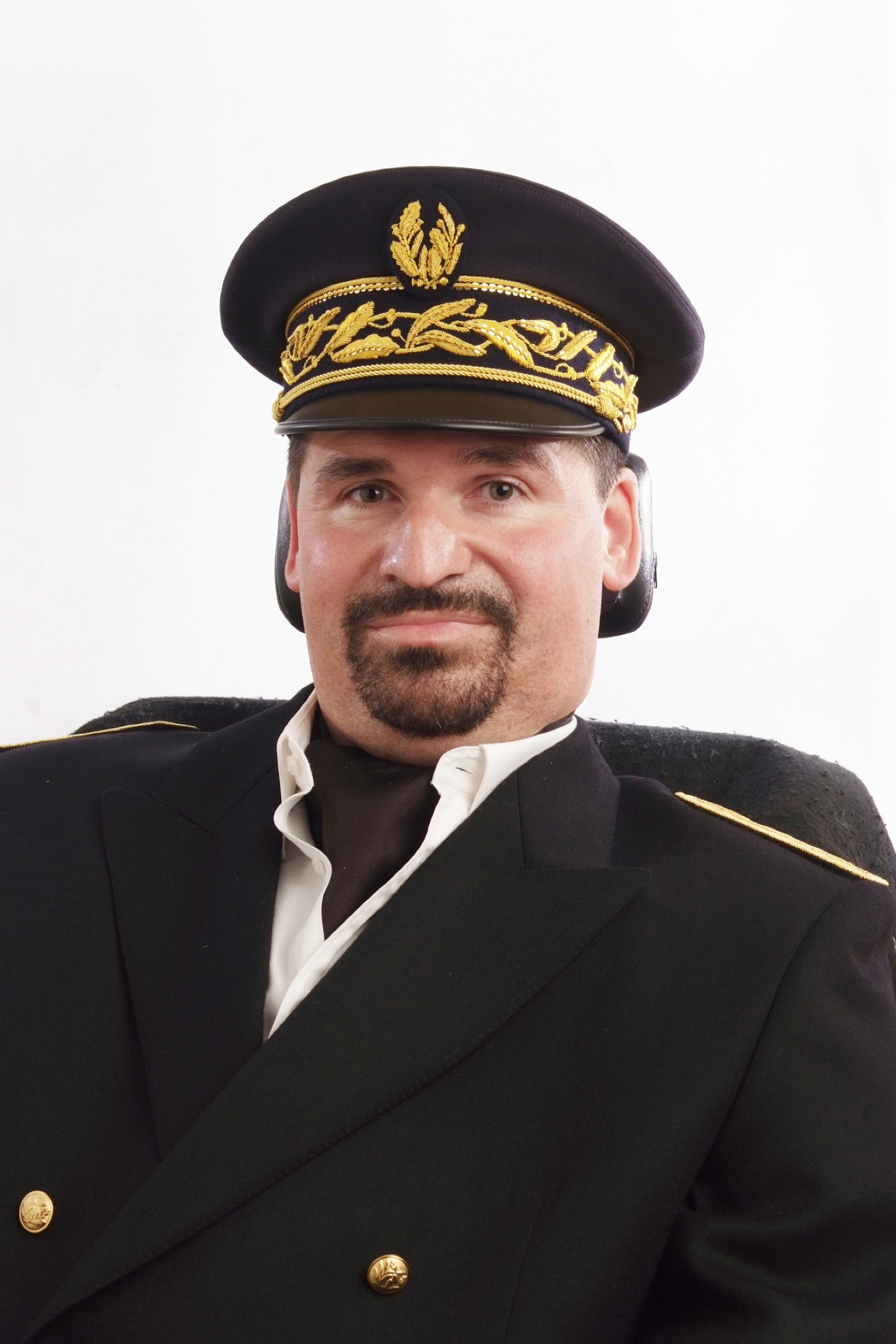
- Jean-Christophe Parisot in 2008
- Born: 20 June 1967; Douala, Cameroon
- Died: 18 October 2020 (aged 53); Montpellier, France
- Occupations: • Disability activist • Political scientist
- Years active: Late 20th into 21st century

Jean-Christophe Parisot de Bayard (20 June 1967 – 18 October 2020) was a French political scientist and disability activist with tetraplegia due to myopathy.

== Early life and education ==
He was born in Douala, Cameroon. At ten he was diagnosed with limb-girdle muscular dystrophy. His two sisters also have this condition. In 1989 he became the first disabled student to graduate from the Sciences Po.

. In 1997 he established the National League of Disabled Students. He graduated in 1995 and became a doctor in political science.

== Career ==
Parisot served as a ministerial delegate in the French Ministry of Employment and Disability Integration. He was also the president and founder of the Collectif des Démocrates Handicapés (Collective of Disabled Democrats). in 2002 and 2007 he ran for presidency just to show that disabled people also can take difficult tasks.

Parisot died on 18 October 2020 at the age of 53.

== See also ==
- List of disability rights activists
- List of French people
- List of physically disabled politicians
- List of political scientists
