= Peggy S. Salters =

First American recipient of electroconvulsive therapy

Peggy S. Salters, from South Carolina, in 2005 became the first recipient of electroconvulsive therapy in the United States to win a jury verdict and a large money judgment ($635,177) in compensation for extensive permanent amnesia and cognitive disability caused by the procedure.

Salters had received outpatient ECT treatment in 2000 (13 shocks in 19 days), and reported losing all her memories of the past 30 years as a result, including all memories of her deceased husband.

She once worked as a psychiatric nurse.
