= Kalvialaya =

Indian NGO

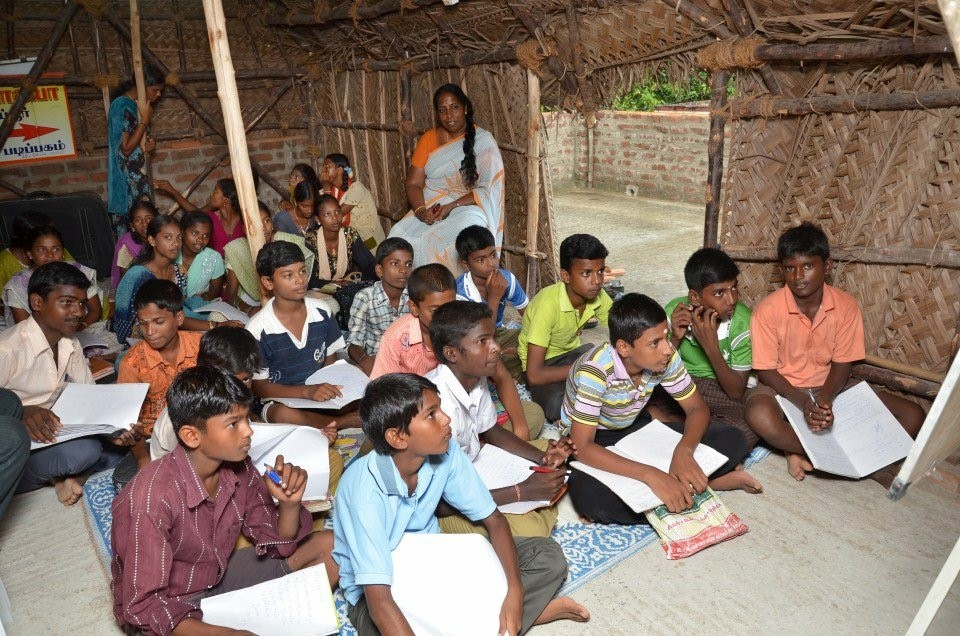
Initially, Kalvialaya rented an open terrace of a student's house and built a class room with the thatched roof. After the roof had been severely damaged in a storm, Kalvialaya built a proper classroom in 2010

Kalvialaya is a NGO registered in 2010, an initiative by M Selvakumar, an alumnus of PSBB school, to help the rural and disadvantaged children of India get education, coaching and guidance. The program helps young people learn to communicate, to build self-esteem, and to make healthy decisions for their futures. It also teaches professional skills to give them greater opportunities for employment, thus lowering their likelihood of future delinquency. The organisation works for the benefit of poor communities of villages in and around Pilapur near Chengelpattu, Kanchipuram District, Madhuranthakam Taluk to combat the continuous adoption of child labour, low daily wages, domestic and community violence, and high levels of unemployment.

== History ==
M Selvakumar, himself a beneficiary of the school institution's benevolence towards the under-privileged, started the Kalvialaya in the year 2010. He was awarded the Shiksha Seva Ratna award for the activities of Kalvialaya by Dr (Mrs) Y. G. Parthasarathy, Dean and Director of PSBB schools.

== Activities ==
Situated in Pilapur village, Chenglepet, Tamil Nadu, India, Kalvialaya helps the rural under-privileged stand on one's own feet through education. Personality development with skills like communication is imparted to the Students there.

Kalvialaya functions as three wings.

Primary Wing: Exclusive wing for helping the children in the Dalit colony (all classes) in studies. Coaching for Board Exams : The main center trains and prepares the tenth, eleventh and twelfth standard students for their Board level exams Training and Personality Development: The third wing strives hard to train the college going students in acquiring the necessary skills, to face interviews and secure employment.
