= Ola Abu Al Ghaib =

Palestinian disability rights activist

- علا أبو الغيب
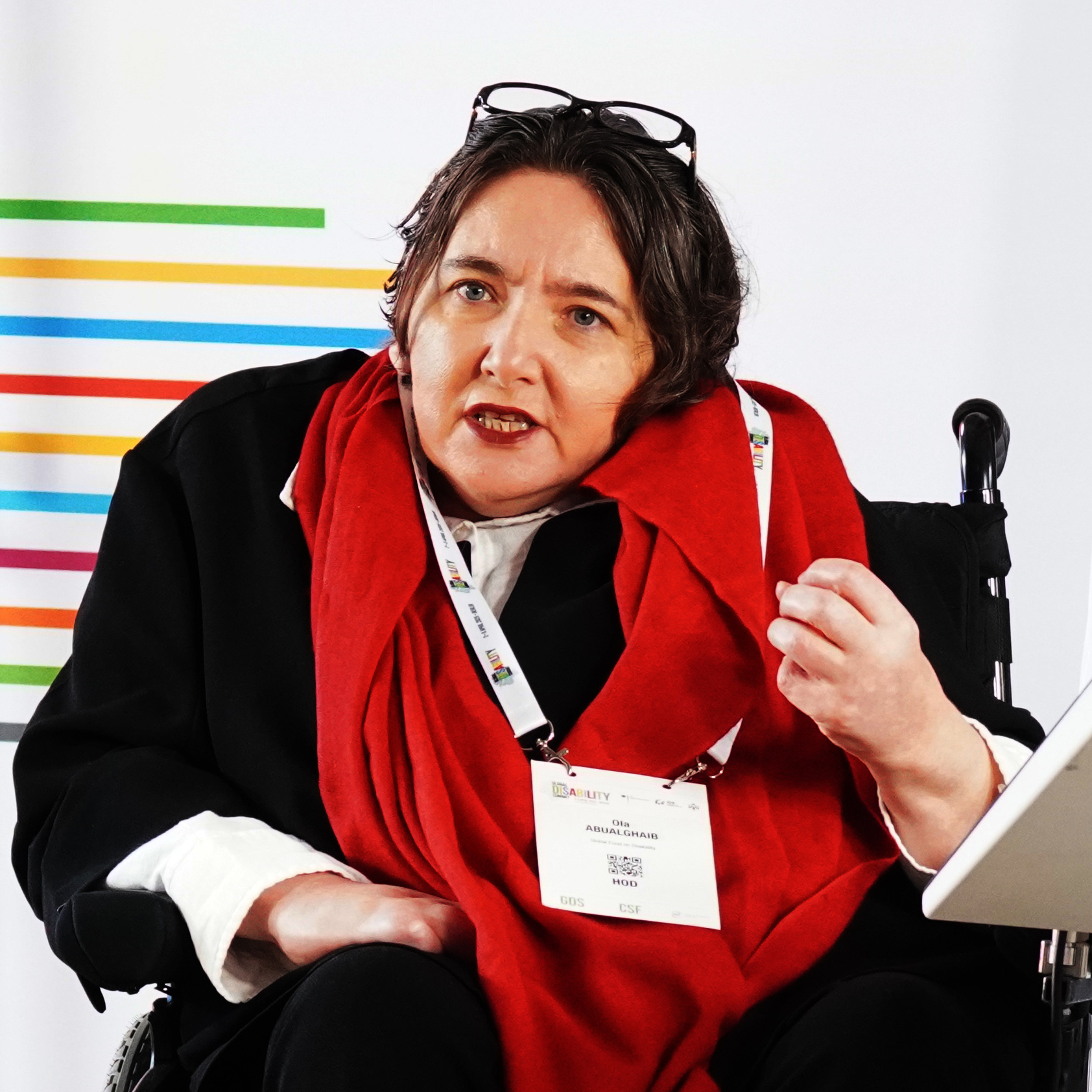
- Ola Abualghaib at the Global Disability Summit 2025 in Berlin.
- Born: Nablus, West Bank, Palestine
- Education: Bethlehem University (BA); Bir Zeit University (MA); Sussex University (MA); University of East Anglia (PhD)
- Occupation: Disability rights advocate

Ola Abu Al Ghaib or Ola Abualghaib (Arabic: علا أبو الغيب) is a disability rights advocate. In August 2019, she was appointed Director of the Technical Secretariat of the Global Disability Fund, formerly the United Nations Partnership on the Rights of Persons with Disabilities (UNPRPD).

Dr. Abualghaib led the organization's development and implementation of the Strategic Operational Framework (SOF) for 2020–2025 and 2025–2030, positioning the Fund as a key global partner advancing disability inclusion. Under her direction, over 100 million USD has been invested in over 100 countries across five regions.

Abualghaib was featured in Apolitical's Gender Equality Top 100 list of the most influential people in global policy in 2019.

== Early life and education ==
Born in Nablus, West Bank, Palestine, Abu Al Ghaib was twelve when she lost the use of her legs. Owing to these life-changing circumstances, she was forced to stay home for three years without schooling. When nearby schools declined to enroll her due to her health conditions, she moved to Bethlehem, where she enrolled in a private school. Initially an observational student, she was officially accepted after earning the highest marks in her class.

During high school, Abu Al Ghaib worked with the physiotherapy department at Bethlehem University to include disabled characters in a few well-known children's stories. She was awarded a scholarship from the Palestinian Ministry of Social Affairs and a German organization for the disabled in recognition of her active role within the disabled students' community in Palestine.

Abu Al Ghaib went on to obtain a bachelor's degree in English Literature and Education from Bethlehem University, a master's degree in project management from Bir Zeit University at Ramallah, a master's degree in Power, Participation and Social Change Institute of Development Studies from Sussex University, and a Ph.D. in Social Protection Policies and Disabilities in Lower Middle-Income Countries from the University of East Anglia.

== Career ==
Abu Al Ghaib started her career advocating for her right to an accessible campus during her university studies. Her efforts earned her a position on the campus construction committee, through which she adapted the university campus to disabled students.

Abu Al Ghaib founded the Stars of Hope Society in 2007, which is run for and by women with disabilities in Palestine. The organization works to protect the rights of disabled women and ensures they have equal opportunities.

She has played a key role in promoting the rights of persons with disabilities, particularly women with disabilities, in development in fragile and crisis-affected settings in the Arab States, Africa and Asia.

Throughout her career, Abu Al Ghaib has supported mainstreaming disability inclusion in collaboration with the United Nations system at national, regional, and international levels. She has worked as a consultant with the World Bank and other United Nations agencies, including the World Health Organization (WHO); International Labour Organization (ILO); United Nations Educational, Scientific and Cultural Organization (UNESCO); and United Nations Children's Fund (UNICEF).

Before joining UNPRPD MPTF, Abu Al Ghaib was the deputy director of LCD International and Global Head of Influencing, Impact, and Learning at Leonard Cheshire Disability – UK from 2016 to 2018, when she was promoted to Global Director. Her responsibilities included policy analyses, program design, management evaluation, research, and the creation of advocacy strategies. She led the organization's efforts in disability-inclusive development.

In 2019, Abu Al Ghaib was appointed Manager of the Technical Secretariat of the UNPRPD MTPF.

== Other activities and recognitions ==
- Board Member at the Global Disability and Innovation Hub – London (2017–present)
- Vice Chair at the International Disability and Development Consortium (IDDC) Brussels (2017–2019)
- Core Group Member at Together2030, New York, USA (2017–2019)
- Board Member at ADD UK (2015–2017)
- Synergos Fellow (Arab World Social Innovators – AWSI) (2011)
- International Woman of Courage Award awarded by the American Consulate (2011)
- Board Member at the Disability Rights Fund Boston, USA (2008–2020)
- Ashoka Fellow (Social Entrepreneur) (2007)
- Global advisory member at UK Research and Innovation (UKRI) and Fordham University (USA)
- Visiting lecturer at the School of International Development at the University of East Anglia

== Publications ==
- Carew, Mark T.; Abualghaib, Ola; Groce, Nora; Kett, Maria (2021). "The Role of Teachers and Caregivers in Adolescent Girls with Disabilities' Sex Education in the Lakes Region of Kenya". Sexual and Reproductive Health of Adolescents with Disabilities. Palgrave Macmillan, Singapore. pp. 103–124. doi:10.1007/978-981-15-7914-1_6. ISBN 9789811579141. S2CID 238029611.
- Cieza, Alarcos; Kamenov, Kaloyan; Al Ghaib, Ola Abu; Aresu, Alessandra; Chatterji, Somnath; Chavez, Facundo; Clyne, Jarrod; Drew, Nathalie; Funk, Michelle; Guzman, Andrea; Guzzi, Eleonora; Khasnabis, Chapal; Mikkelsen, Bente; Minghui, Ren; Mitra, Gopal; Narahari, Priyanka; Nauk, Gisela; Priddy, Alice; Sabeh, Alaa; Reyes, Maria Soledad Cisternas; Vasquez, Javier; Widmer-Iliescu, Roxana (2021). "United Nations workstream on COVID-19 disability inclusive health response and recovery". Archives of Public Health. 79 (1). Arch Public Health 79, 148: 148. doi:10.1186/s13690-021-00656-7. PMC 8377454. PMID 34416912.
- "Impact of Cash Transfers on Access to Employment of People with Disabilities. Employment and Disability: Issues, Innovations, and Opportunities". Labor and Employment Relations Association. 2019.
- "Disability Data Collection: Emerging Opportunities from Recent Global Initiatives. Disability and International Development: Data and Disability". Behinderung und Entwicklungszusammenarbeit e.V. (bezel). 2019.
- Abualghaib, Ola; Groce, Nora; Simeu, Natalie; Carew, Mark T.; Mont, Daniel (2019). "Making visible the invisible: Why disability-disaggregated data is vital to leave no-one behind. Sustainability". Sustainability. 11 (11). 3091: 3091. doi:10.3390/su11113091.
- "Every child counts: understanding the needs and perspectives of children with disabilities in the State of Palestine". UNICEF. December 2016.
- "Paralympic Games: Should the bidding criteria change? | Leonard Cheshire Disability". Leonardcheshire.org. 8 September 2016. Archived from the original on 2017-03-27.

== See also ==
- Rula Hassanein
