= Eva Middleton =

Belizean disability rights activist

- Born: Eva Narcisa Middleton c.1953 Punta Gorda, Belize
- Died: March 25, 2018 (aged 65); Karl Heusner Memorial Hospital
- Resting place: Lord Ridge Cemetery
- Occupation: disability rights activist
- Known for: Belize Assembly for Persons with Diverse Abilities (BAPDA)
- Notable work: co-founder, Breast is Best (BIB); helped create Living Independently in Full Existence (LIFE)

Eva Narcisa Middleton (c. 1953 – March 25, 2018) was a Belizean disability rights activist. Middleton began her career working with non-governmental organizations promoting breastfeeding and later served as a polyclinic administrator. In 2010, she joined the Belize Assembly for Persons with Diverse Abilities (BAPDA) where she played a key role in increasing membership and became the "voice and face of BAPDA." Middleton also started an organization to help the elderly, Living Independently in Full Existence (LIFE).

== Biography ==
Middleton was born in Punta Gorda. She lived in Lake Independence and was involved in various community activities and was a co-founder of Breast is Best (BIB). BIB helped promote breastfeeding with new mothers, provided information and breast pump rental. She also worked in San Antonio, Cayo as a polyclinic administrator.

Middleton returned to Belize City in 2010 and began to work as a disability rights activist. Middleton became a leader and driving force behind the disability rights organization, the Belize Assembly for Persons with Diverse Abilities (BAPDA). Middleton turned BAPDA, a dormant organization, into one that had around 400 members. She was considered the "voice and face of BAPDA," according to BAPDA president, Roxanne Anthony Marin. As an advocate, she made multiple calls to Belize morning shows, sharing various activities carried out by BAPDA. She was known for her lectures during Disability Week. Middleton helped organize prosthesis clinics in Belize with BAPDA, partnering with Prosthetic Hope International Belize. Middleton herself was an amputee and had a prosthetic leg.

Later, Middleton co-founded create Living Independently in Full Existence (LIFE), an organization to aid the elderly in the country. Today, LIFE is managed by the Sisters of Charity of Nazareth.

Middleton died at age 65 on March 25, 2018, in the Karl Heusner Memorial Hospital, where she was being treated following a stroke. She was buried in Lord Ridge Cemetery.
