= James Charlton (activist) =

American disability rights activist

James I. Charlton is an American author, disability rights activist, and Executive Vice President of Access Living in Chicago.

He holds that disability is socially constructed. He created a model of the disability rights movement that differentiates between a number of different kinds of organizations.

== Career ==
He has a graduate degree from the University of Chicago. Charlton has been Director of Programs, Executive Vice President and Acting President of Access Living since 1985. Charlton is an assistant professor in the Department of Disability and Human Development at the University of Illinois at Chicago. He is a member of the Chicago Transit Authority's board of directors.

In 2000, he published the book Nothing about us without us: disability oppression and empowerment.

Charlton authored the journal article Peripheral Everywhere about disabled persons as "double outcast".

== See also ==
- List of disability rights activists
- List of disability rights organizations
