= Julie Fernandez =

British actress and model

Julie Mare Fernandez (born 20 April 1974 in Hampstead, London) is a British actress and model best known for her role as Brenda in the BBC comedy The Office. Fernandez has been working full time as an Access Coordinator since April 2022. Fernandez was hired by Casarotto Ramsay & Associates in 2023 as an agent to represent, train and develop talent, supporting all those with access requirements across the film, television and theatre industries.

== Early life ==
Fernandez was born with osteogenesis imperfecta and uses a wheelchair. She was a student at Treloar School in Hampshire. Her father is Argentinean and her mother is English.

At the age of 14, Fernandez appeared on the popular BBC television series Jim'll Fix It. In October 2012, following a series of sexual abuse allegations made against the series' late host Jimmy Savile, Fernandez claimed that Savile had touched her inappropriately during the recording.

== Career ==
Her acting career began in 1992 when she starred as Vanessa Lockhead in the short-lived BBC soap opera Eldorado. She went on to play Sean Maguire's girlfriend in BBC1 drama Dangerfield before landing the role of Brenda in The Office.

In 2004, Fernandez formed a television production company called The Wheelie Good Company and has spent the time since working on new programme ideas. The company was set up by Fernandez to improve the representation of disabled people in the media but no longer focus on disability-related material.

She appeared as a regular guest on the quiz show HeadJam.

Fernandez also runs an arts and craft small business in Cambridgeshire, Bee Crafty, specialising in patchwork and quilting.

== Personal life ==
Fernandez is married to Andrew Elliott. She and her husband are foster parents.

Fernandez is a disability rights activist in the United Kingdom and has supported campaigns for the Disability Rights Commission and Scope. She set up The Disability Foundation, a British pan-disability charity boasting one of the largest disability information databases in the UK. In January 2003, she co-hosted the opening ceremony for the European Year of People with Disabilities in Athens.
