= The Disability Foundation =

Non-profit organization in the UK

The Disability Foundation (TDF) is a United Kingdom based non-profit organization.

The foundation was founded in 1998 by the British actress Julie Fernandez. TDF began as a limited company and registered charity (1998) and gained charitable status in 1999. All of its therapists are fully qualified and undergo DBS checks.

Its aim is to improve the lives of disabled people and anyone with a chronic health issue or medical condition. They also support families and those involved in disabled people's care by offering complementary therapy treatments. The foundation has a clinic on the grounds of the Royal National Orthopedic Hospital (RNOH) in Stanmore.

Treatments on offer include: Remedial and Therapeutic Massage, Aromatherapy, Acupuncture, Reflexology, Chiropody, Counselling, Osteopahty, Reiki and Craniosacral Therapy.

TDF also provides information about conventional and complementary treatments and therapies.
