= Neema Namadamu =

Women's and disability rights activist

Chief Advisor to Congo's Minister of Gender and Family
- In office before 2007

Founder of the Maman Shujaa (Hero Women) movement
- In office 2012

Personal details
- Born: Marunde, South Kivu Province
- Occupation: activist

Neema Namadamu is an advocate for peace and a women's rights and disability rights activist in the Democratic Republic of the Congo (DRC). She founded the Maman Shujaa Media Center to empower women and give them voices to tell their stories.

== Biography ==
Namadamu was born in the High Plains of Itombwe in South Kivu Province. When she was two, she contracted polio and became physically disabled because of the disease. Because of this, her father decided to take a second wife because in the DRC, disabled children are "often regarded as a curse." She recalls that as a child, she did not have crutches, so her mother, Polline Nyirambarato, carried her on her back to school when road conditions were poor. Namadamu started promoting awareness for people with disabilities when she was in high school and had her own radio show. Later, when she went to college, she became the first woman with disability from her tribe to graduate from university in DRC.

After she graduated, she was chosen as a Deputy to represent South Kivu Province in the National Assembly. After serving in Parliament, she became the Technical Advisor for the DRC Minister of Gender and Family.

When Namadamu's daughter was twenty-five, she was attacked by members of the Congolese National Army and beaten. Namadamu recalls that she "felt a strong desire for violent revenge," however, she chose to break the cycle of revenge and instead of fighting individuals, "We are fighting the system," she said. Namadamu founded the Maman Shujaa Media Center which works in connection with World Pulse, a global women's empowerment network. The organization is located in Bukavu, where she is able to provide digital literacy education for women. Maman Shujaa means "Hero Women" and the project is designed not only to educate women, but to give them a platform to share their stories with the world. Each woman learns to become a "digital activist" in the DRC. Her work shows "the resilience and importance of women in Congo who live in an environment that is violently oppressive to women."

== Awards ==
In November 2023, Namadamu was named to the BBC's 100 Women list.
