= Lizzie Kiama =

Kenyan disability rights activist

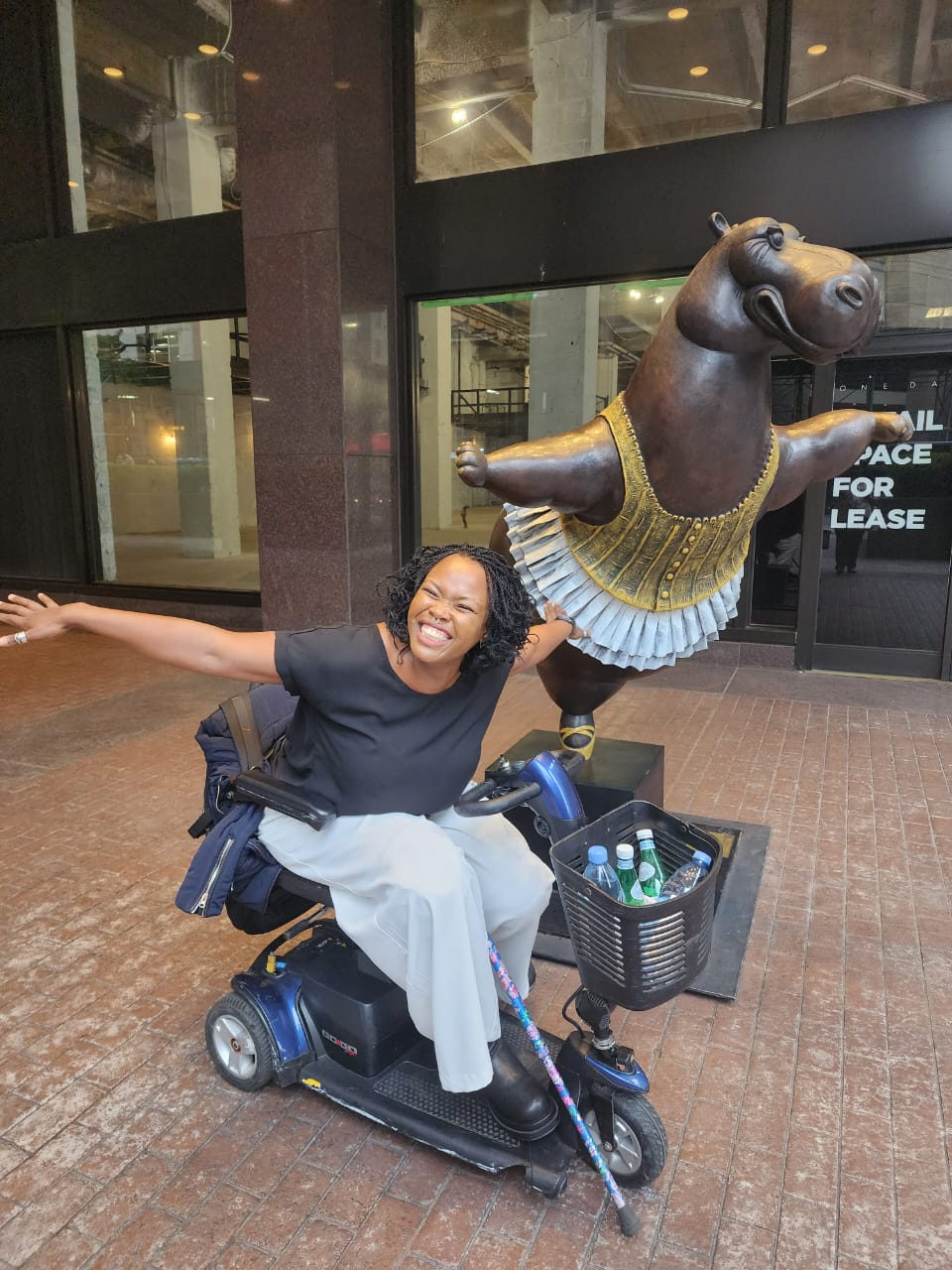
Lizzie Kiama at the World Bank, New York

Lizzie Kiama is a Kenyan disability rights activist and founder of a disability rights organization.

== Early life and education ==
Kiama is from Mombasa and was the first born of four children. She has a bachelor's degree in Business Administration from the United States International University.

At the age of 18, Kiama was injured in a car crash, which resulted in a physical disability. Complications while giving birth a few years later resulted in her disability becoming permanent.

== Career ==
Kiama founded This Ability Trust, in 2012, to support companies with inclusion of people with disabilities and to empower women and girls with disabilities, and to promote rights enshrined in the Convention on the Rights of Persons with Disabilities.

In 2016 Kiama coordinated national advocacy efforts towards advancing sexual reproductive health rights of women and girls with disabilities in Kenya using the Convention on the Elimination of Discrimination Against Women (CEDAW) which received specific recommendations on the rights of women and girls with disabilities in the Concluding Observations to the State report. In 2018, as the director of gender and disability at This Ability, she was one of several activists chosen to attend the 62nd session of the Commission for the Status of Women (CSW).

In 2019, This Ability organized a side event on the sexual reproductive health rights of women and girls with disabilities in Africa under the auspices of the ICPD+25 Nairobi Summit and contributed to SRHM article "Actions, not words: progress since ICPD on disability and SRHR".

As a panelist during a 2020 webinar related to sexual and reproductive health and rights during the COVID-19 pandemic, Kiama discussed the impacts of the pandemic on access to essential services for the disability community. In 2021, she was a contributor to a UNFPA report, "My body is my own: Claiming the right to autonomy and self-determination." In April 2021, with support from UNFPA, This Ability established a confidential toll-free service for women with disabilities seeking sexual and reproductive health services, known as Mama Siri.

Kiama is an Ashoka fellow.

== Family ==
Kiama is married and has one daughter.
