= Tiffany Brar =

Indian social activist

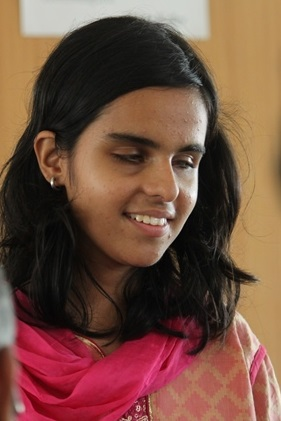

Personal details
- Born: Tiffany Maria Brar Chennai, Tamil Nadu
- Education: Government College for Women, Thiruvananthapuram, Ramakrishna Mission Vivekananda University, Coimbatore
- Occupation: Founder of Jyothirgamaya Foundation, Disability Rights Activist
- Profession: Social worker, Special educator
- Known for: Social activist, Motivational Speaker, Inclusion, Disability rights and Advocacy
- Awards: National Award from the President of India for Best Role Model, Holman Prize, Nari Shakti Puraskar the highest civilian Honour for women in India from the President of India

Tiffany Brar is an Indian community service worker who became blind as an infant due to oxygen toxicity. Brar is the founder of the Jyothirgamaya Foundation, a non-profit organization that teaches life skills to blind people of all ages. She is a trainer, a campaigner for disability awareness and an advocate for an inclusive society.

== Early life and education ==
Tiffany Brar is the only daughter of General T. P. S. Brar and Leslie Brar. Tiffany was born in Chennai, India, where her father was posted, and grew up in Punjab.

Tiffany Brar had Terry Syndrome and became blind six months after her birth. Due to her father's military occupation, Brar travelled widely. Because she was blind, verbal communication was important and she became multilingual.

During her childhood, Brar learnt to fluently speak five Indian languages. She started her education in Great Britain while her father was posted there. When her family returned to India, Brar studied in schools for the blind, in integrated schools and in military schools. After completing her primary education in Kerala, her father was transferred to Darjeeling, where Tiffany studied at the Mary Scott Home for the Blind.

As a blind person, Brar found school difficult. She was made to sit at the back of the class and was sometimes not allowed to answer questions. Her Braille notes either arrived late or did not arrive at all. She was looked after by her parents.

At her schools, Brar experienced segregation and isolation by other pupils, and was excluded from events. She reached first position in the CBSE board exam in 12th grade in a school alongside sighted counterparts.

After completing school in 2006, Brar joined for the bachelor's degree programme in English literature at Government College for Women, Thiruvananthapuram, affiliated to the University of Kerala. After graduating in 2009, Brar started working for Braille Without Borders as a telephone operator. She travelled to various organizations where she came across many underprivileged blind people who were confined to their homes and lacked proper training. During one trip, she found roads are slippery or covered with stones, making them unsuitable for blind people, and that in some parts of India, blind people are confined to their homes by unsupportive societies. This encouraged her to found the Jyothirgamaya Foundation to support the education of blind and partially sighted children. In Kerala, visually impaired children are trained in Malayalam, the regional language, through text-recognition software but do not attend special schools and are taught neither Braille nor English. Brar campaigns though Jyothirgamaya to change the system.

After working for two years, Brar pursued her B.Ed in special education (visual impairment) from Sree Ramakrishna Mission Vivekananda University in Coimbatore. In July 2012, she began running the Jyothirgamaya (meaning "leading to light") mobile school for the blind. The idea for the organization came from a retired police officer from Tamil Nadu, N. Krishnaswamy, to help children constrained by poverty, disability, or distance.

In 2018, the Government of India praised Brar for her efforts during flooding in Wayanad, where she collected materials for relief camps.

Brar now travels alone throughout India and abroad.

== Career ==
Tiffany Brar's first job was as a receptionist, after which, she studied for a B.Ed in special education at Ramakrishna Mission Vivekananda University then went on to found the Jyothirgamaya Foundation in July 2012 to improve the lot of blind and partially sighted people in Kerala.

Brar set up a mobile school for blind children, saying; "If the blind cannot go to school then the school shall go to them." She was inspired with this idea after her leadership training at Kanthari run by a German lady, Sabriye Tenberken and her Dutch partner, Paul Kronenberg at Vellayani.

Through the Jyothirgamaya Foundation, Brar trains blind people in Braille, mobility, basic computer use, and life skills. She has also recently initiated a project, Road to Independence, which holds training camps in Kerala. She is an artist, teacher and motivational speaker, and has served as an ambassador for the WWF's 2016 Earth Hour campaign in India. In 2020 she, became the first Indian to receive Holman Prize from the US-based organisation LightHouse for the Blind and Visually Impaired.

In 2019, Brar opened a preparatory school and kindergarten for visually-impaired children in Thiruvananthapuram, which was inaugurated by Kerala Health Minister K.K.Shailaja.

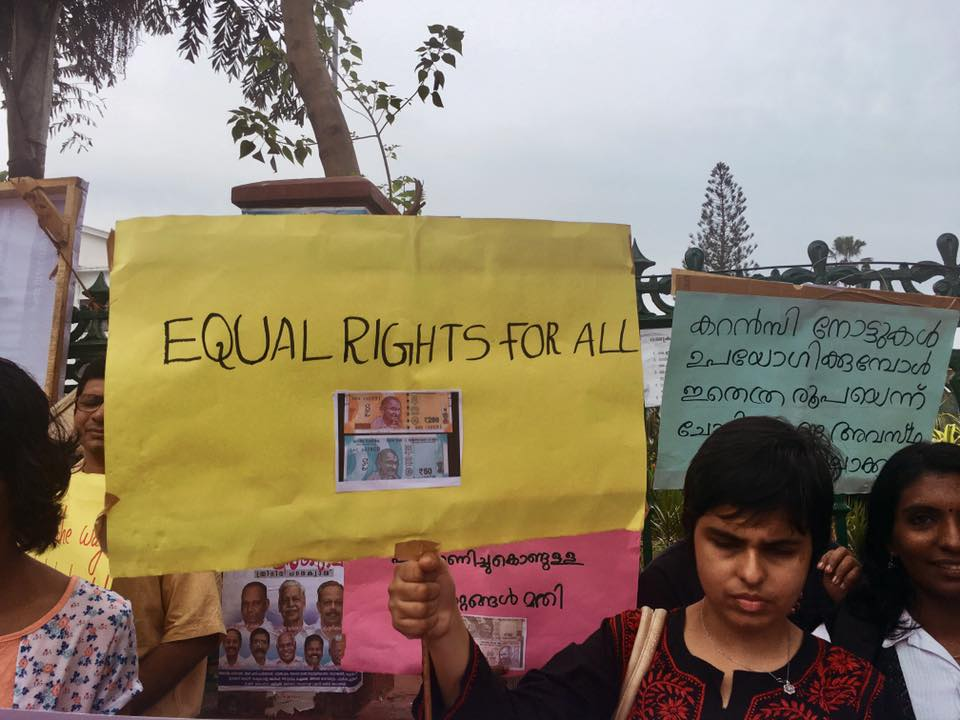
Tiffany Brar while protesting for accessible currency in Trivandrum,2018

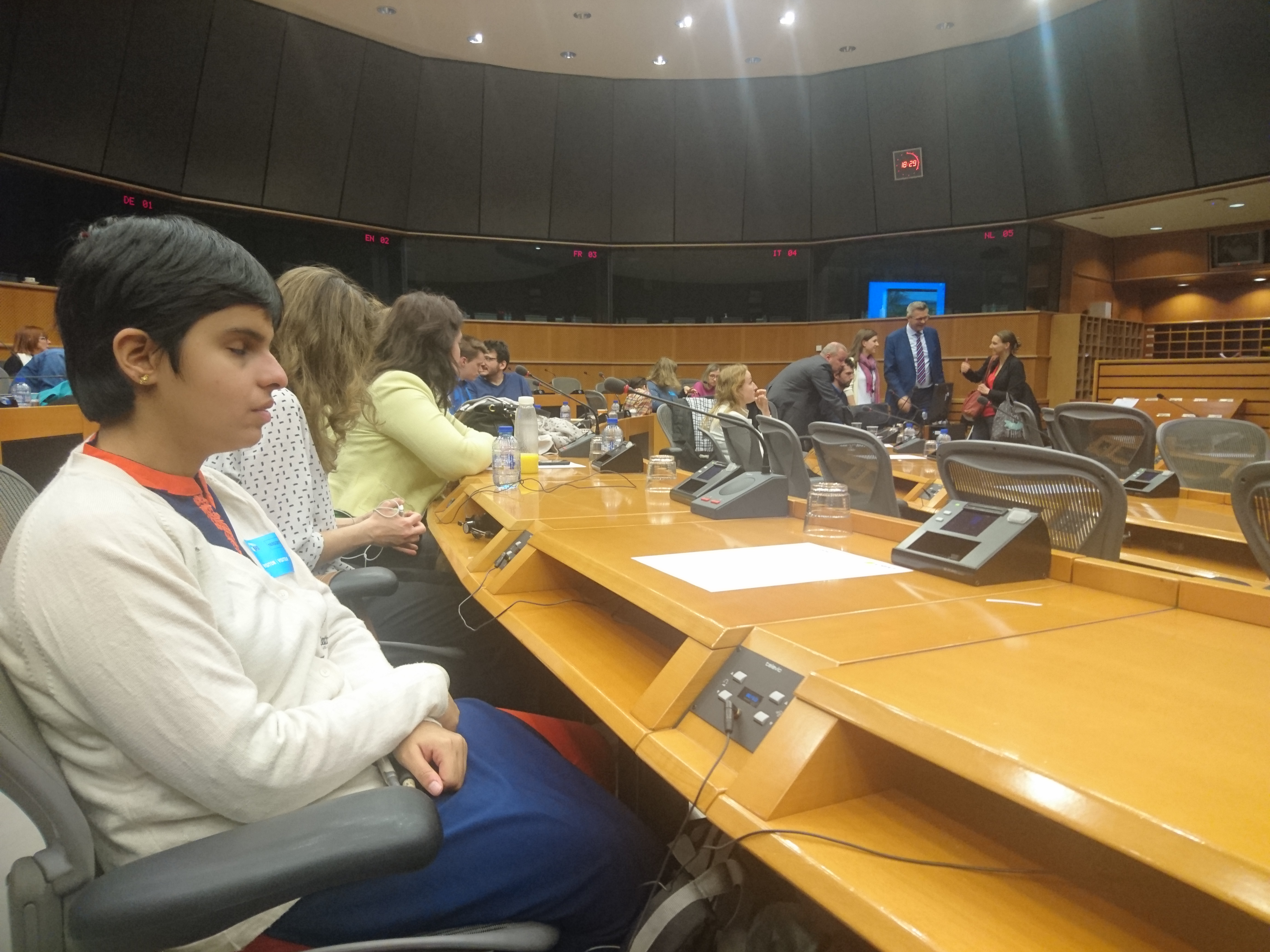
Brar attending the screening of a documentary about social change makers around the world at the European Parliament in Brussels, Belgium in 2017

Brar designed the Tiffy template, which was built by inventor Paul D'Souza; it is a small template that identifies Indian currency notes to prevent blind people from being cheated by traders.

== Awards ==
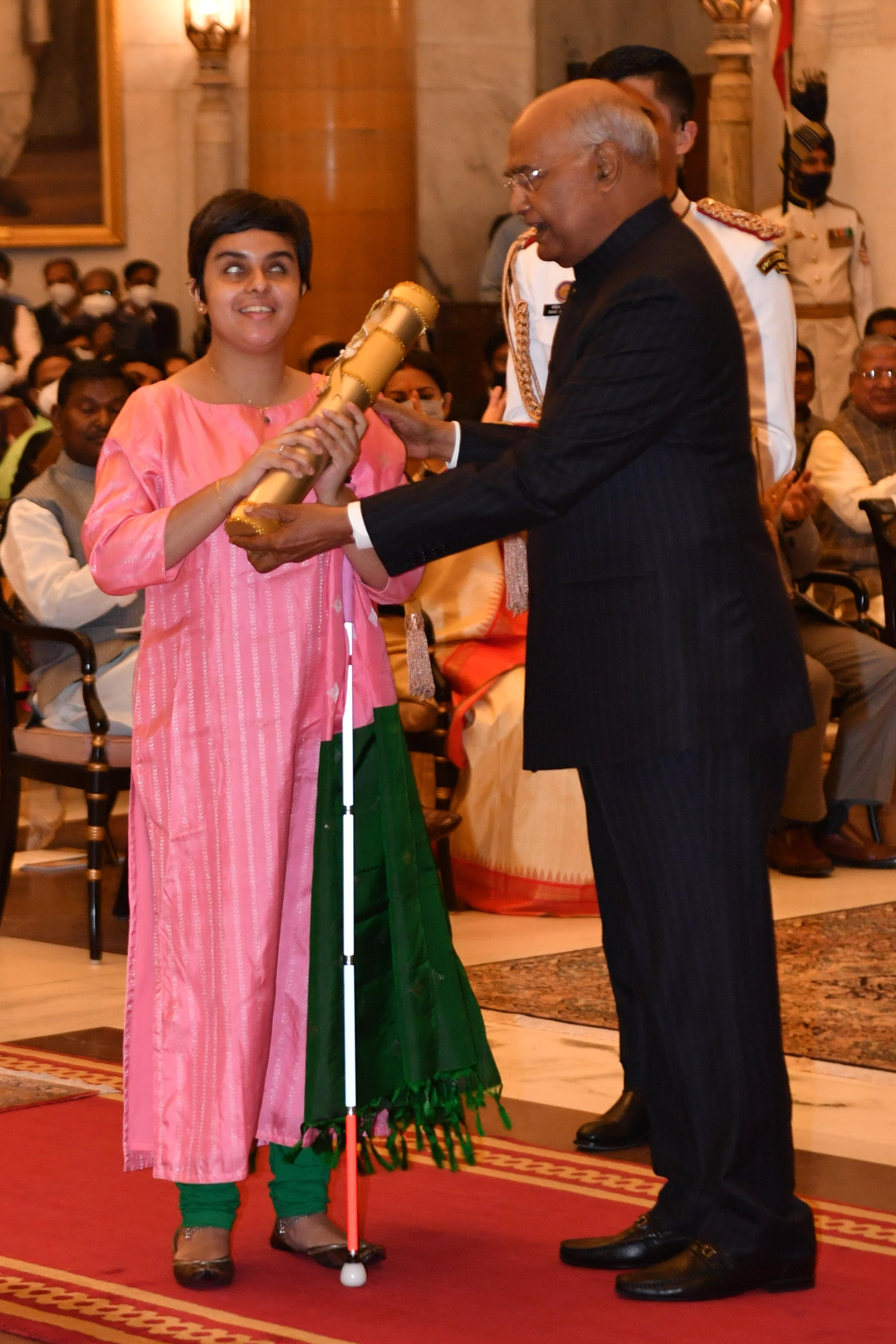
Tiffany Brar receiving the Nari Shakti Puraskar, the Highest Civilian Honor for Women for outstanding contribution to women's empowerment from the Honorable President of India Ram Nath Kovind on 8 March 2022 on the occasion of International Women's Day

Tiffany Brar receiving National Award for Best Role Model from the Honourable President of India, Dr.Ram Nath Kovind on 3 December 2017 on the occasion of International Day of Persons with Disabilities

- In 2023 she received International Woman's day Award from the Delhi Commission for women
- In 2022 she was awarded the Nari Shakti Puraskar for empowering visually impaired rural women.
- In 2021, she received the Inspiring Woman Award from eiT NASSCOM.
- In 2020, she received The Holman Prize from the Lighthouse for the Blind, United States.
- In 2020, She received the Spirit Awards from World Pulse, United States.
- In 2019, she received The Spindle Award for Project Jyothirgamaya From Voice, Netherlands.
- In 2019, she received World of Difference International Award from The International Alliance for Women, Australia.
- In 2019, she received Iconic women for making the world a better place Award from Women Economic Forum.
- In 2019, she received the Award for Excellence in social service from the Kochouseph Chittilappilly Foundation, awarded by Kochouseph Chittilappilly.
- In 2019, she received the Wonder Woman Award for her Community service from Ladies Circle India.
- In 2019, she received the Neelam Khurshid Kanga Award from the National Association for the Blind, awarded by John Abraham.
- In 2018, she received the Helen Keller award from the National Centre for Promotion of Employment for Disabled People (NCPEDP), awarded by Dr. Sathya Pal Singh, Honorable Minister of State for Human Resource Development.
- In 2018, she received karma Rathna Award for Outstanding social worker from Palm International.
- In 2018, she received the Real Hero Award by ZEE TV from Vivek Oberoi, Omung Kumar and Huma Qureshi.
- In 2018, she received the Vocational Excellence Award from Rotary International.
- In 2018, she received the Phoenix Award from Padma Shri Mammooty.
- In 2018, she received the Women of Vision Kerala vanitha Rathna Award.
- In 2018, she received the Make A Difference Award from Rotary International.
- In 2018, she received the Women of the Year Award from Job Day Foundation.
- In 2017, she received the National Award for being a 'Best role model' from the President of India
- In 2017, she received the Age of Unknown Award by TEDx vazthacaud.
- In 2017, she received the Sarojini Trilok Nath-National Best Role Model Award from National Association for the Blind.
- In 2017, she received the Bold and Beautiful Award from Doordarshan.
- In 2016, she received the Prestigious Saarthak Naari Women Achievers Award.
- In 2016, she received the For the Sake of Honour Award, Rotary International's highest award.
- In 2015, she received the Women of the Year Award from Hope Trust.
- In 2012, she received the Kerala State Award for Social Worker.

== Recognition ==
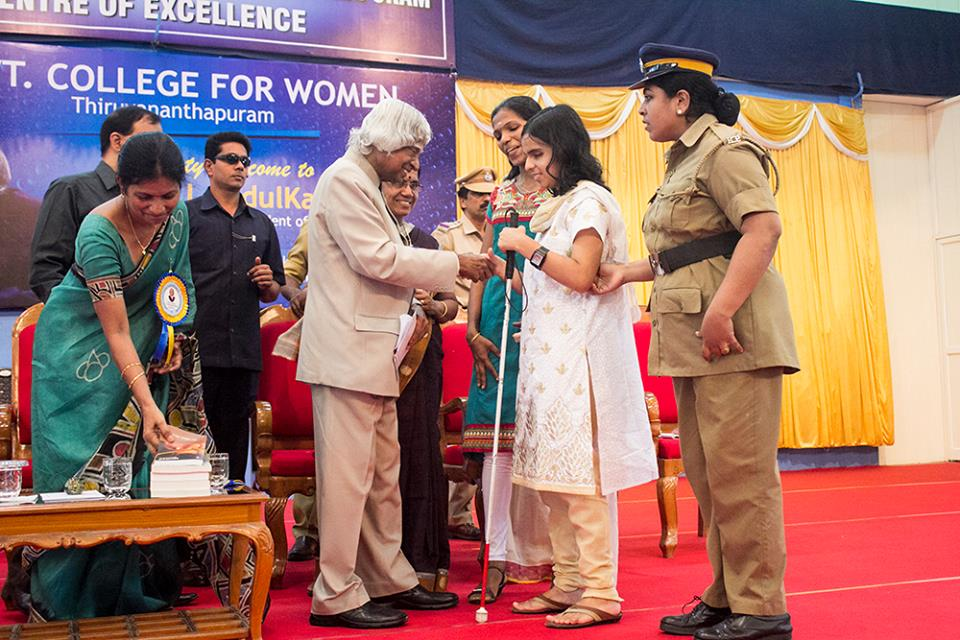
Tiffany Brar with former president of India Dr.A. P. J. Abdul Kalam during his visit in Government College for Women, Thiruvananthapuram

- Ram Nath Kovind, President of India calls her while addressing the Nation during his speech on United Nations' International Day of Persons with Disabilities when she received the National Award, in 2017, for the Best Role Model. He recognized her achievements in the field of social service and adventurous activities.
- A.P.J.Abdul Kalam former president of India, appreciated Tiffany Brar for her efforts to empower her fellow visually impaired people around the world.
- Tiffany Brar was felicitated for her achievements by the Malayalam actor Padma Shri Mohanlal, in his talk show Lal Salam. He called Brar "A miraculous woman".
