= Issta =

Israeli tourism company

Issta Lines Ltd.
- 155
- Type: Public (TASE)
- Traded as: TASE: ISTA
- Industry: Tourism
- Founded: 1956
- Headquarters: Tel Aviv, Israel
- Revenue: ▲ est. 1,500 million ILS
- Number of employees: 1,100
- Website: www.issta.co.il

Issta Lines is a public traded tourism company founded in 1956. Its shares are traded on the Tel Aviv Stock Exchange. The Issta Group has over 60 branches, call centers, and online travel services throughout Israel. The Group employs over 1000 permanent employees in Israel and abroad. In 2014 the Group had a turnover of approximately $650 million.

== History ==
Issta is an acronym which stands for Israeli Student Travel Association, a name which reveals its initial purpose: a student exchange organization which began operating at the Technion – Israel Institute of Technology in 1956. Issta's first commercial step was marketing discounted seats for students in Zim Integrated Shipping Services passenger ships (formerly ZIM Israel Navigation Company). In 1958, Issta began operating as an independent company owned by the Technion Student Body. In the same year Issta leased airplanes and began marketing cheaper flights to Athens, Greece. Issta continued functioning as a charter operator and cruise retailer, and during the 1960s turned Athens Airport into its hub.

Following the increase of incoming Student Travel and Volunteering in Israel during the 1960s, Issta began providing services for Incoming Tourism: Bus Tours around Israel, hostels, hotels and printed matter. Following a model outlined by the International Student Travel Confederation, Issta signed long-term contracts with various airlines and began marketing specially-priced seats for youth and students in regular flights.

In the summer of 1978, Issta leased an aircraft from El Al for a season and operated student charter flights from Tel Aviv to European destinations. In the summer of 1979 Issta leased a 260-seat aircraft from Capitol Airlines and operated its first trans-Atlantic flight to New York. Later that summer Issta operated 2 weekly flights to New York in an aircraft leased from 'El Al Charter Services Ltd.' (later Sun d'Or International Airlines).

In 1985, Issta joined the Israeli Travel Agent Association. In 1987 Issta owned eight branches and employed 120 workers. Its annual revenue reached $9 million and for the first time it granted scholarships for students. In 1989 Issta began launching branches in Israel's suburban and peripheral towns. Computerization of the company began in the late 1980s. Issta Direct Call Centre began operating as an informational telephone line in the beginning of the 1990s.

In 1995, Issta's gross revenue reached $90 million. The company employed 300 workers in 20 branches. In May 1996 the company was issued in Tel Aviv Stock Exchange. In 1999 Nofesh Yashir call center began operating. The Issta Internet travel website was launched in 2000.

Issta operates through a group structure that includes divisions in tourism, real estate, and business travel. Subsidiaries include Issta International Hotels, Academy Travel, and American Express Travel Israel. In 2022, the National Union of Israeli Students sold a 16% stake in the company, ending its position as a controlling shareholder. That same year, Issta launched an employee stock option plan granting equity to approximately 350 employees.

In 2022, Issta reported a net profit of ₪244 million, the highest in the company’s history, representing a 128% increase over 2021.

In the 2020s, Issta expanded its aviation-related activity through commercial arrangements with Israeli airlines. In 2025, the company signed a five-year agreement with Israir involving advance payments and block seat allocations across long-haul routes, including aircraft in Israir’s new wide-body fleet.

In parallel with its core travel operations, Issta developed tourism real estate ownership in Israel and internationally. In 2017, it partnered with Fattal Hotels to acquire three hotels in Paphos, Cyprus. As of 2025, Issta owns or manages fifteen hotels, including properties in Greece, Cyprus, and Portugal.

Issta and Israel Credit Cards (CAL) announced the establishment of a joint online hotel booking platform intended to compete with international booking providers. The platform integrates booking functionality with payment services. Industry publications have noted that the company also issues travel vouchers that are redeemable through its booking channels.

In 2025, Issta launched “Daniel AI,” a virtual travel agent operating via WhatsApp. Israeli media described it as the first AI-based travel agent of its kind in the local travel industry. According to company statements, Daniel AI generated over 1 million in vacation package bookings within its first two months.
