= Kat Watkins =

Welsh disability activist

- Education: University of Portsmouth
- Occupations: Activist, nonprofit executive
- Known for: Disability rights

Kat Watkins is a Welsh disability rights activist and campaigner who has championed equal access for disabled people in politics. She works for the charity Disability Wales and has worked with a variety of organisations to improve disability access.

== Background ==
Watkins grew up in a village near the Brecon Beacons with four siblings. They were raised by their father who worked as a security guard for the Ministry of Defence. She studied Leisure Management and Marketing as an undergraduate at the University of Portsmouth and has a masters in Development and Human Rights.

Watkins has osteogenesis imperfecta and lives in Swansea.

== Work ==
Watkins has worked for Disability Wales for several years, serving as their Disability Officer and UNCRDP Development Officer. In this role she worked with schools in Wales to help educate children about disability rights as part of the Curriculum for Wales. She has also worked on the charity's Access to Politics Charter, as their Access to Politics Project Officer. The charter, which was published in 2026, sets out recommendations to ensure disabled people are able to participate in politics. Watkins has also worked with disability support networks to support disabled people who want to get involved in politics.

Watkins is the chair of the Swansea Disability and Inclusion Panel. She has worked with Swansea Access for Everyone (SAFE), a group that has previously worked with Swansea Council to make pathways more accessible, with the NHS to provide information on changing places in Swansea, and provided feedback on the redevelopment of Swansea railway station.

Since 2023 she has served as a director of Social Firms Wales, an organisation that supports social enterprises that are seeking to become more inclusive. She has organised for YesAbertawe, the Swansea branch of YesCymru.

== Activism ==
Watkins has been a strong advocate for disability rights, using her own experiences to highlight inequalities disabled people in Wales face. This includes ableism she has faced at her GP, and issues she's faced when travelling with Transport for Wales Rail. She has since become a member of Transport for Wales' accessibility panel.

Watkins has advocated for a ban on cars parking on pavements, due to the risks it causes for wheelchair users. Watkins has spoken widely about the issues this has caused for her, including one time where she crashed into a lamppost while checking a map, causing her to break several bones.

She is supportive of the Motability scheme and has warned that reductions could isolate disabled people. When "luxury" cars including BMW's and Mercedes were removed from the scheme, Watkins told the BBC that she was almost left without a car, as she had only just leased a Mercedes-Benz Vito the week before. The Mercedes was the only car on the scheme that had a suitable wheelchair lift for her needs.
