= Yuliia Sachuk =

Ukrainian activist (born 1982)

Yulia Sachuk
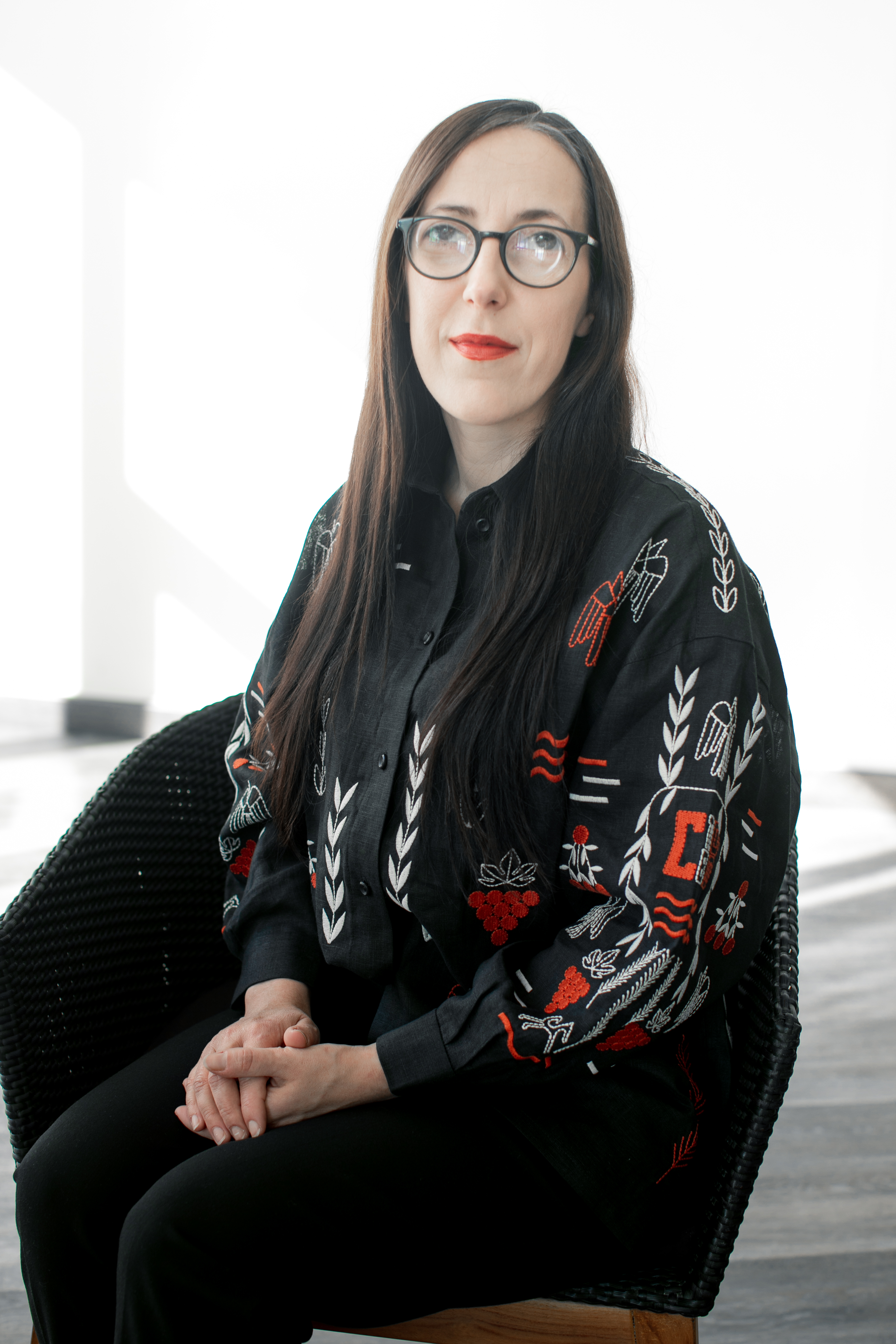
- Yuliia Sachuk in 2023
- Born: 25 April 1982 (age 44); Lutsk, Ukrainian SSR, Soviet Union
- Education: Lesya Ukrainka Volyn National University
- Occupation: activist for the rights of the disabled people
- Awards: 100 Women (BBC) (2022)

Yuliia Mykolaiivna Sachuk (Ukrainian: Юлія Миколаївна Сачук; born 25 April 1982) is a Ukrainian activist for the rights of the disabled people. She is the co-founder and president of Fight For Right, an organization of people with disabilities. Sachuk was honored as one of the BBC 100 Women in 2022.

== Biography ==
Sachuk was born and raised in Lutsk, Ukraine. She started human rights activisim as a child, when she had to defend the right to study in a general education school, and not in a boarding school for the visually impaired. Sachuk studied international relations from Volyn National University. She also did the program "Tolerance to diversity: understanding and implementation for politicians" in the United States.

From 2007 to 2011, Sachuk worked as an assistant at the human rights organization Amnesty International in Ukraine. In 2016, Yuliia became coordinator of the Fight for the Right project. A year later Fight For Right grew from a small project to a public organization. In 2020, she was nominated as Ukraine's candidate for the UN Committee on the Rights of Persons with Disabilities. In 2022, during the Russian invasion of Ukraine, the Obama Foundation's Leaders of Europe program supported Sachuk and the entire Fight For Right organisation. Former US president Barack Obama personally recognized the work of Sachuk and her organization to save people with disabilities during the Russian invasion of Ukraine.

Sachuk is the co-founder of the Accessible Cinema project, the goal of which is to ensure the availability of video content (films, series, cartoons) for blind and deaf people.
