= Lilian Dibo Eyong =

Cameroonian wheelchair model

- Born: Lobe Estate, Cameroon
- Education: University of Buea; Gospel Outreach Counseling Training Institute
- Occupations: Wheelchair model, disability rights activist, author
- Organization: Lilian Dibo Foundation
- Known for: Disability rights advocacy; founder of the Lilian Dibo Foundation; First Runner-up at Miss Wheelchair Cameroon 2019
- Notable work: Living with Disability (2019)
- Awards: Inspire Award (2021); World Pulse Spirit Award (2021); Most Dynamic Physically Challenged CEO (2021)

Lilian Dibo Eyong is a Cameroonian wheelchair model, polio survivor, and activist.

== Personal life ==
Lilian was born in Lobe Estate, as the last child in a polygamous family. She is the eleventh and youngest child from her father's side, and the seventh and youngest child from her mother's side. At the age of two years and six months, following a bout of fever, she was found to have been affected by poliomyelitis. Lilian grew up in Camp 9, where she attended early primary school. Her older siblings would take turns to carry her on their backs to and from school. Lilian completed her primary school in Bekora Barombi (Ndoro). She then pursued her secondary education in Kumba.

Lilian got pregnant when she was in Form 5 and returned to Bekora. Her son Nathanael was born by C-section. She returned to Kumba to take her Ordinary Levels, followed by her Advanced Levels. She graduated from the University of Buea to pursue a degree in accounting. Lilian was the only wheelchair user during her stay there and faced infrastructural, communication, and attitudinal barriers, among others.

When Lilian was in her second year at university, the Anglophone Crisis broke out. It coincided with the students' strike for presidential grants, which was supposed to have been awarded to students with GPAs of over 2. However, the students were driven away with tear gas by the military. Because of the all the rioting, Lilian had to leave Buea and move to Bekora. When the fighting intensified, she and her family left for Lipenja for safety.

Lilian then enrolled at the Gospel Outreach Counseling Training Institute in Kumba, where she obtained a Diploma in Trauma Counseling and was awarded the Best Outstanding Student.

In 2019, Lilian wrote a book called Living with Disability and began hosting a radio program to educate the public based on her personal experience as a person with disability.

== Modelling ==
In mid-2019, Lilian entered the Miss Wheelchair Cameroon Contest and was the First Runner Up that year. She used the platform to advocate in the media for the rights of women and girls with disabilities.

== Activism ==
In March 2020, Lilian founded the Lilian Dibo Foundation (LDF), which works to ensure that women and girls with disabilities gain their full potential through advocacy, education and empowerment programs. The foundation co-sponsored the National Outstanding Youth Empowerment Leadership Award 2020. This is an award that is given to Cameroonian youths who are engaged in community change efforts. In early 2021, the foundation sewed and distributed over 1500 facemasks in Kumba and Buea, carried out capacity-building workshops to raise awareness on rape targeting women and girls with disabilities, and provided capital for small businesses, while supporting families of children with disabilities by giving them mobility devices, and lending a hand with hospital bills.

Lilian is a Digital Ambassador at World Pulse, a volunteer at Rescue Women – Cameroon as a Disability Inclusion Development Officer, the Country Manager for Project Peace Lights, and the executive director for Project Peace Lights Cameroon.

== Awards and recognition ==
Lilian won the Inspire Award from I Am Cameroon in 2021. She was awarded the World Pulse Spirit Award by World Pulse in 2021, and Most Dynamic Physically Challenged CEO from DREAMZ FM in 2021. Lilian is a 1000 Voices Fellow at Every Woman Coalition.
