= Rich Donovan =

Canadian businessman

Rich Donovan is best known for tracking the intersection of corporate profitability with corporate commitment to disability hiring and best practices. His Return On Disability Index is reported on Bloomberg and has been used as the basis of an Exchange Traded Note (ETN) by Barclay's Bank on the NYSE Arca Stock Exchange.

== Accessibility and finance work ==
=== Development of the Return on Disability Index ===
Donovan is a founder of several research and advisory companies that have foregrounded the business case for companies and governments to act on the disability market. In 2008, he founded what is now called The Return on Disability Group The organization's "Return on Disability Reports" and other models helps companies understand their performance across disability factors that are linked to profitability. As well they produce the Return on Disability Indices for the U.S. and Canada markets. These financial tools "recognize public companies that are outperforming in the disability market." The RoD US 100 and the RoD Canada 50, are published daily by Bloomberg LP. The indices track the shares of the 100 firms that deal best with disabled people.

=== LIME ===
In 2006, Donovan founded Lime Connect, an organization whose goal is to find employment for people with disabilities. The idea with Lime Connect is: "to connect with the brightest people with disabilities from all disciplines. Results have been stellar, with the Lime Connect Fellowship Program placing 20 young stars in 2011 alone, six of whom were hired by Google." Other companies Lime has partnered with include PepsiCo, Bank of America/Merrill Lynch, IBM, and TD Bank.

=== Fundamental concepts ===
As one of the early progenitors of the business case for accessibility, Donovan has focused on the following:

  - Strategic road maps for companies to do accessibility well. What works within their strategic frameworks.
  - What accessibility practices drive value at specific companies that, in turn, drive investor returns
  - the notion of Shared value so that the next ten years of growth will come from non-traditional markets such as people with disabilities

=== Education ===
Donovan received his BBA in Finance from the Schulich School of Business at York University (1993 - 1997) and his MBA from Columbia Business School (2000 – 2002). He worked as a trader for Merrill Lynch. He has cerebral palsy.

== Honors and awards ==
  - Queen Elizabeth II Diamond Jubilee Medal, Chancellery of Honours, Office of the Secretary to the Governor General of Canada, February 2013.
  - Lieutenant Governor's Community Volunteer Award, Lieutenant Governor of Ontario, August 2014.
  - Leadership in Diversity and Inclusion, Merrill Lynch & Co, April 2006.
  - Champion of Change, Bubel-Aiken Foundation, October 2008.
  - Corbett Ryan Pathways Pioneer Award.
  - American Academy for Cerebral Palsy and Developmental Medicine, Pathways.org, October 2013.
  - Life Without Limits Award for Excellence, United Cerebral Palsy Associations Inc, April 2008.

=== Volunteer experience and causes ===
  - Vice President - Board of Directors Cerebral Palsy International Research Foundation, January 2007 – Present.
  - 1997 Candidate for Federal Parliament -York West Conservative Party of Canada, May 1997.
  - Member, Board of Trustees United Cerebral Palsy, January 2008 – September 2014.
  - Member, Investment Committee - United Cerebral Palsy, January 2008 – Present.

=== Publications ===
The primary annual report published by The Return on Disability Group is the "Global Economics of Disability".
