= Muhammad Atif Sheikh =

Pakistani disability rights activist

- Education: University of East Anglia
- Occupation: Disability rights activist
- Known for: Special Talent Exchange Program and the South Asian Disability Forum
- Title: Executive Director, Special Talent Exchange Program (STEP)

Muhammad Atif Sheikh is a Pakistani disability rights activist. He is the executive director of the Special Talent Exchange Program (STEP), an organisation of persons with disabilities based in Islamabad, which traces its origins to a self-help group he helped start in 1997. He was the first chairperson of the South Asian Disability Forum. In 2012 the United Nations Economic and Social Commission for Asia and the Pacific (UNESCAP) selected him as one of seven promoters of its Make the Right Real campaign, which supports the Incheon Strategy for persons with disabilities in Asia and the Pacific.

== Early life and education ==
Sheikh was born with a physical disability. He attended the Al-Farabi Special Education Centre in Islamabad, and in 2007 studied at the University of East Anglia in the United Kingdom as a Chevening Scholar. He is also a Hubert H. Humphrey Fellow.

== Career ==
=== Special Talent Exchange Program ===
According to The Express Tribune, fifteen young people with disabilities led by Sheikh gathered in Islamabad in 1997 and created the group that became STEP. After returning from the United Kingdom in 2008, Sheikh and his colleagues developed it into STEP, a cross-disability organisation. Press reports have described him as STEP's president and as its executive director.

By 2013 STEP, with assistance from Handicap International, was running the Information Resource Centre on Disability, a national database of persons with disabilities that Sheikh told IRIN had helped the organisation locate its constituents after the 2010 floods. From 2009 STEP advised Telenor Pakistan on its Khuddar Pakistan disability initiative, and in 2019 Telenor Pakistan, Unilever Pakistan and STEP launched the Disability Job Center, an online portal for job seekers with disabilities and for employers. STEP has also worked with the International Foundation for Electoral Systems and the Election Commission of Pakistan on accessible voter education materials, managed a one-year programme for women with disabilities that concluded in 2017, and in December 2022 held a panel discussion with the National Commission on the Status of Women and UNFPA on access to gender-based violence services for women and girls with disabilities. In May 2024 the National Disaster Management Authority launched an e-learning toolkit on disability-inclusive disaster risk reduction developed with UNESCAP and STEP.

STEP developed NOOR AI Equal Access, an artificial intelligence-based service providing information on disability rights, gender-based violence and legal assistance, which received a Zero Project Award in 2026.

=== Regional and international work ===
In 2002, Sheikh represented Pakistan at the World Assembly of Disabled Peoples' International and the Osaka Forum on Disability and Development in Japan. He was the founding chairperson of the South Asian Disability Forum. The Government of Pakistan agreed to establish the forum, with a secretariat in Islamabad, at the close of a 2010 regional leadership conference for persons with disabilities that STEP co-organised with the Ministry of Social Welfare and Special Education, the British Council, Telenor Pakistan and Sightsavers. The forum has held a civil society seat on UNESCAP's Working Group on the Asian and Pacific Decade of Persons with Disabilities in 2013–2017, 2018–2022 and 2023–2032.

== Views ==
Sheikh has advocated the social model of disability over the medical model. He has criticised the government's implementation of the Convention on the Rights of Persons with Disabilities, which Pakistan ratified in 2011, including the enforcement of job quotas for persons with disabilities. He has questioned official disability statistics, describing the 0.48 per cent disability rate recorded in the 2017 census as implausible, and said that in 2013 STEP had asked for the Washington Group questions to be included in the census. He has also spoken about the lack of state support for families caring for members with severe disabilities. In 2017, according to The Express Tribune, he criticised the motivational speaker Muniba Mazari for presenting what he described as a charity model of disability.

== Recognition ==
In 2012, UNESCAP selected Sheikh as a promoter of its Make the Right Real campaign. In 2023, the organisation Diversability included him in its D-30 Disability Impact List.
