= Satendra Singh (doctor) =

Medical doctor and activist

Dr Satendra Singh
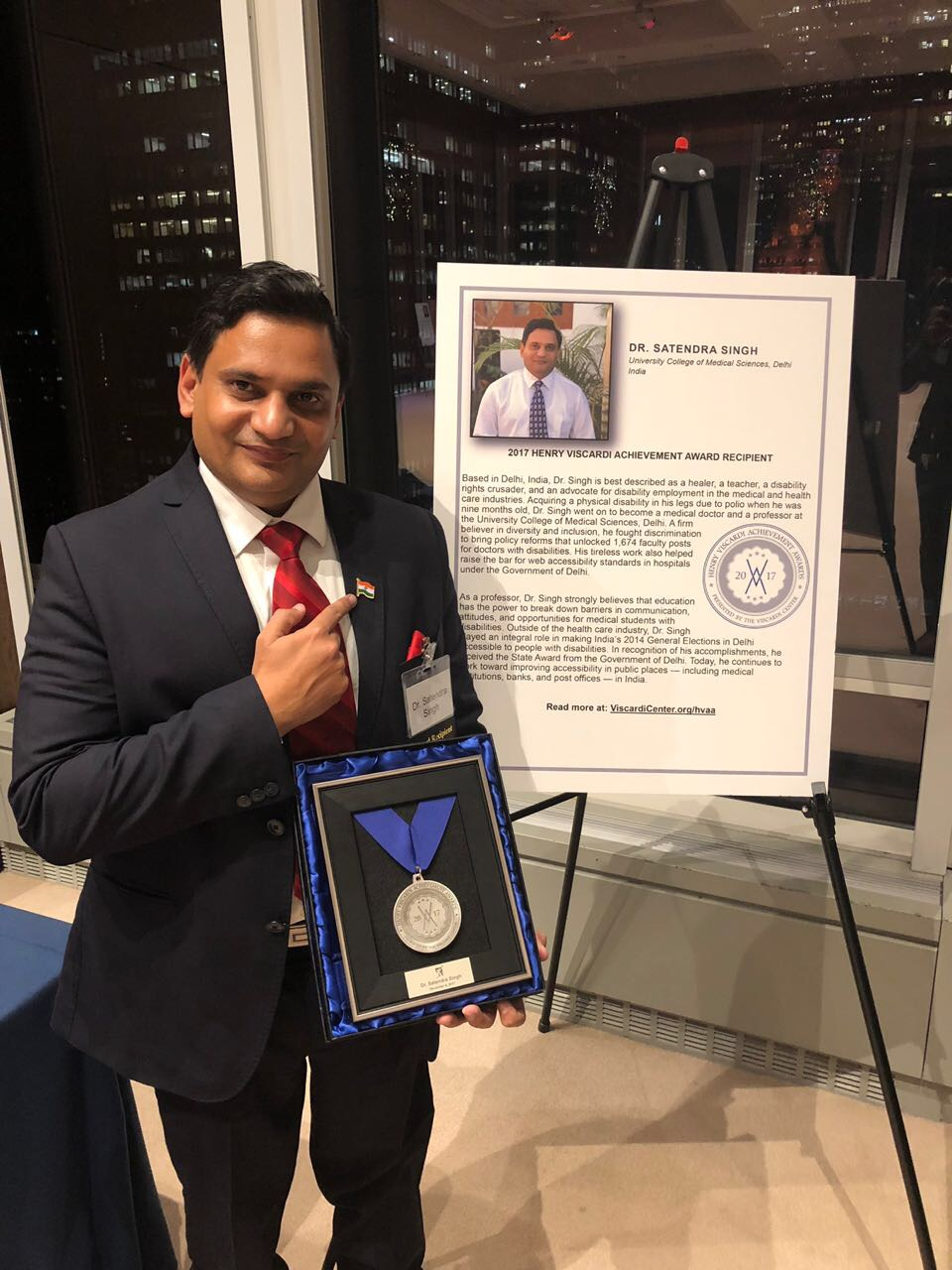
- Dr Satendra Singh with the Henry Viscardi achievement award
- Education: MBBS, MD
- Alma mater: Ganesh Shankar Vidhyarthi Memorial Medical College, Kanpur, Uttar Pradesh
- Organization: University College of Medical Sciences
- Known for: Disability rights activism

Dr Satendra Singh is a medical doctor at the University College of Medical Sciences and Guru Tegh Bahadur Hospital, Delhi. A physiologist by profession, Singh contracted poliomyelitis at the age of nine months but went on to complete a Bachelor of Medicine, Bachelor of Surgery from Ganesh Shankar Vidyarthi Memorial Medical College, Kanpur and later on Doctor of Medicine in Physiology. He is the first-ever Indian to win the prestigious Henry Viscardi Achievement Awards given to extraordinary leaders in the global disability community. He has been honoured with the WHO South-East Asia Public Health Champion Award 2025 for leading transformative advocacy that redefined disability — shifting it from a medical limitation to a human rights and equity issue, and shaping policies, curricula, and institutional practices in India and beyond.

Singh is a noteworthy disability activist who is known for his sustained efforts to make public places, employment opportunities and voting rights accessible for disabled persons. For his body of work, he received a National Award by the President of India. Singh is also the first Indian to be awarded the MacLean Center for Clinical Medical Ethics fellowship at the University of Chicago.

Singh had been involved in the synthesis of epibatidine analogues, leading to the discovery of epiboxidine. In contrast to RTI-336, which positions a 3-tolyl group on the isoxazole ring to the DAT receptor, a phenyl group was too sterically encumbered to be tolerated in the case of the nicotinic receptors. Although aromatic moieties seem to be tolerated at the mGlu5 receptor in the case of ADX-47273.

Singh is known not only for advocating for his own disability rights, but also for his work to protect other disabled doctors' rights. He raised public awareness regarding the discrimination by UPSC which disallowed doctors with disabilities to apply for various Central Health Services (CHS) employment positions. Dr. Singh, himself, was rejected in 2014 but challenged the rejection and was later allowed to appear for the interview. In 2013, his application was once again rejected and he highlighted the same discrimination was present in other job posts, for the second time. He was subsequently allowed to apply in a quick intervention.

Singh's RTI revealed that doctors with disabilities are not considered eligible for specialist CHS posts in teaching, non-teaching as well as public health specialties. Undeterred, he complained again and requested the health ministry to allow all eligible doctors with disabilities to apply for these posts. Dr. Singh's single-handed relentless fight for justice over four years ultimately forced the Health Ministry to make 1,674 specialist central posts available for disabled doctors.

== Advocacy for doctors with disabilities ==
The apex court of India, in its judgment, lauded his achievement as that of someone who has scaled extraordinary heights while braving all adversities. He was also instrumental in contributing to the Supreme Court of India's disability jurisprudence in Om Rathod v Director General of Health Services (2024) as well as Anmol v Union of India (2025). In the former case, Singh's report contrasted sharply with the approaches of the AIIMS panel which lead the apex court direct NMC to revise its guidelines in line with functional competency assessments and clinical accommodations. In the later case, the apex court came down heavily on the NMC's "both hands intact" stipulation calling it reeks of ableism, had no place in statutory regulation and made a mockery of the principle of reasonable accommodation. Upholding Singh's dissent against 5 AIIMS board panel, the court directed NMC again to revise its guidelines in consultation with doctors with disabilities.

In 2013, as a result of his petition to the Court of the Chief Commissioner for Persons with Disabilities, under the Ministry of Social Justice and Empowerment, the Government of India instructed Medical Council of India to issue directives to all the medical institutions in India to be inclusive of disabled doctors. Despite this mandate, most medical institutions did not comply with the directions.

In 2018, Singh filed a petition to the Supreme Court of India to advocate for doctors with disabilities within the Central Government, and to add amendments to the controversial MCI guidelines lifting the bar on admission of candidates with specified disabilities.

WHO South-East Asia Region Public Health Champion 2025

in 2019, Singh sparked an international conversation about a lack of disability rights in the medical field which led to an international collaboration to frame disability competencies for health profession educators. Through sustained judicial advocacy with the Medical Council of India, Singh successfully led to the incorporation of disability rights as a human rights issue in the new medical curriculum in India. This was a significant moment. Disability competencies promoting equity and social justice became a mandatory part of the Indian medical school curriculum. Disability rights were no longer overlooked or treated as elective or optional, and became a mandated part of the learning curriculum for students enrolled in medical school.

== Advocacy for people with disabilities ==
In 2012, Singh held a black armband protest on the United Nations' International Day of Persons with Disabilities in 2012, which led authorities to construct ramps outside all the hostels at his medical college.

In the same year, Singh's judicial activism led to the web accessibility of all the hospitals under Government of Delhi. Singh set up an Enabling Unit for persons with disabilities and founded Infinite Ability. These are the first such bodies in any medical college in India.

In 2013, Singh was a whistleblower to raise awareness about problems faced by voters with disabilities, both before and during the 2013 Delhi Legislative Assembly election, through Right to Information Act. Singh advocated and wrote to the election commission and the Chief Justice of India advocating on behalf of disabled voters to ask that they be permitted to vote before declaration of final results. His RTI on fourth National Voters' Day revealed that Election Commission of India was unprepared and violated Supreme Court orders of 2004 to safeguard the rights of voters with disabilities.

After this incident, Delhi asked Singh to be involved in election proceedings in Delhi, to ensure that they are inclusive of people with disabilities. Singh advised the election officers to assist voters with disabilities and helped set up a disability registration helpline. Singh helped facilitate election booths across the capital to make them accessible to disabled and elderly voters. The Election Commission of India also made its website more user-friendly to people with disabilities. Singh received State and National Award for these initiatives.

Singh's continued advocacy on behalf of disabled people also led to ramps being constructed to facilitate access at bank ATM machines in India. He raised awareness by highlighting inaccessible ATMs at banks, and at post offices throughout the capital, advocating for people with disabilities through the Right to Information Act.

Singh organized the first Theatre of the Oppressed workshop for medical students in India with disabilities. Singh was also instrumental in organising a unique 'Blind with Camera' workshop for the visually impaired and blind students of University of Delhi in 2012 with Partho Bhowmick.

In 2014, after being harassed by security personnel at the Hyderabad airport because of his orthosis (sometimes known as braces or calipers). Dr Singh approached Directorate General of Civil Aviation (DGCA) and Bureau of Civil Aviation Security (BCAS) to amend screening procedures to incorporate Convention on the Rights of Persons with Disabilities. (BCAS) As a result, both DGCA and BCAS implemented sensitivity training for airport security personnel to ensure people with disabilities are no longer harassed or humiliated at airports.

In 2016, Singh continued fighting for the rights of disabled citizens, when he challenged Union Public Service Commission's format requiring disabled applicants to paste photographs showing their disability as proof of their disability. The Court of Chief Commissioner for Persons with Disabilities directed the UPSC to refrain from asking disabled candidates to submit photographs showing their disabilities; and, to consider the 'permanent disability certificate' issued from a government hospital as sufficient valid proof. His advocacy led to the withdrawal of similar proforma by IITJEE

After Rotary International established World Polio Day (24 October) to commemorate the birthday of virologist Jonas Salk who developed polio vaccine, the erroneous observance was challenged by Singh in his publication in the official journal of the Edward Jenner Society's Vaccine (journal). Google dedicated a doodle on Salk's 100th birthday to confirm October 28 as Salk's correct birthday. Rotary still celebrates the day on October 24, despite media reporting that the correct date of birth is October 28.

== First case under the new disability law ==
In April 2017, Singh filed the first-ever case under the new Rights of Persons with Disabilities Act, 2016, which imposes strict punishment for contravention of provisions of the Act. This first case was filed against Indian Politician named Satyadev Pachauri after he publicly ridiculed a female disabled employee. If convicted, Pachauri will face a six-month to a five-year prison term.

== Intersex rights ==
UNDP-ILGA International Pride Award 2026

In 2021, Singh, together with activists Dr. Aqsa Shaikh and Dr. Sanjay Sharma, successfully petitioned the Delhi Commission for Protection of Child Rights after they recommended Delhi Government ban medically unnecessary sex normalisation surgeries on intersex children.

== Awards and honors ==
- National Award by President of India on Election Commission of India's National Voters' Day 2021
- UNDP-ILGA International Pride Award 2026 in the Extraordinary Ally category at WorldPride Amsterdam
- World Health Organization South-East Asia Public Health Champion Award 2025
- State award by Delhi Election Commission on National Voters Day 2020 on contributing to make the General Elections 2019 inclusive and accessible.
- Bucksbaum Institute International Scholar, 2019 at the Bucksbaum Institute for Clinical Excellence at the University of Chicago.
- MacLean Center for Clinical Medical Ethics fellowship from University of Chicago in 2019
- Mary Glowrey - Liliane Brekelmans Disability Award – 2019 by Catholic Health Association of India and Liliane Foundation, Netherlands.
- Henry Viscardi Achievement Awards by the Viscardi center in 2017.
- 'Medical Personality of the Year' award by Delhi Medical Association in 2017.
- State Award by the Government of Delhi for exceptional achievement by a person with disability in the field of social work in 2016.
- NCPEDP MphasiS Universal Design Awards 2013.
