= Ashish Suri =

Indian neurosurgeon and medical academic

- Born: 8 April 1970 (age 56); New Delhi, India
- Education: Delhi Public School, R. K. Puram; University College of Medical Sciences; All India Institute of Medical Sciences, Delhi
- Known for: Studies on skull-base surgeries and neurooncology
- Awards: 2014 N-BIOS Prize; The Spine Journal; Outstanding Paper Award; NSI Best Poster Award; ISPN Best Paper Award
- Scientific career
- Fields: Neurosurgery; Neurooncology
- Workplaces: All India Institute of Medical Sciences, Delhi; Indian Institute of Technology, Delhi

Ashish Suri (born 8 April 1970) is an Indian neurosurgeon, medical academic and a professor at the Department of Neurosurgery of the All India Institute of Medical Sciences, Delhi. He was one of the group of surgeons who performed the first 3D brain surgery and the first surgery to implant a spinal cord stimulator in India. Known for his work in Endoscopic endonasal surgery and neurooncology and is a member of the executive committee of the Indian Society of Neuro-Oncology. The Department of Biotechnology of the Government of India awarded him the National Bioscience Award for Career Development, one of the highest Indian science awards, for his contributions to biosciences, in 2014.

== Biography ==
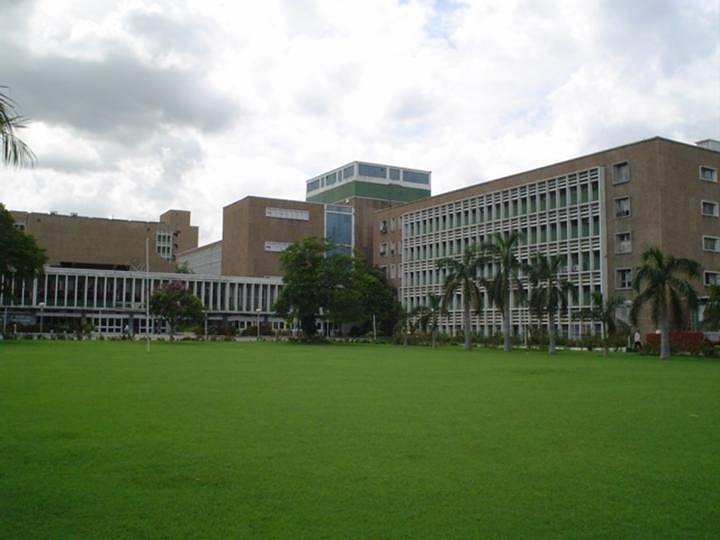
AIIMS Delhi

Born on 8 April 1970, in New Delhi, Ashis Suri did his early education at Delhi Public School, R. K. Puram and graduated in medicine from the University College of Medical Sciences, Delhi. Subsequently, he did his MCh at the All India Institute of Medical Sciences, Delhi (AIIMS Delhi) and obtained the Diplomate of National Board certification. His career started as a junior resident at AIIMS Delhi in 1994 and became an assistant professor of neurosurgery in 2000. After holding the positions of an associate professor and an additional professor, he was made a full professor in 2012 and holds the position to date. In between, he had various stints abroad for advanced training on disciplines such as Cavernous sinus and skull-base surgery, Endoscopic neurosurgery, Vascular neurosurgery, Image guided and endoscopic spinal surgery and Endoscopic endonasal surgery. He is also in charge of the Neurosurgery Education And Training School of AIIMS Delhi.

== Professional profile ==
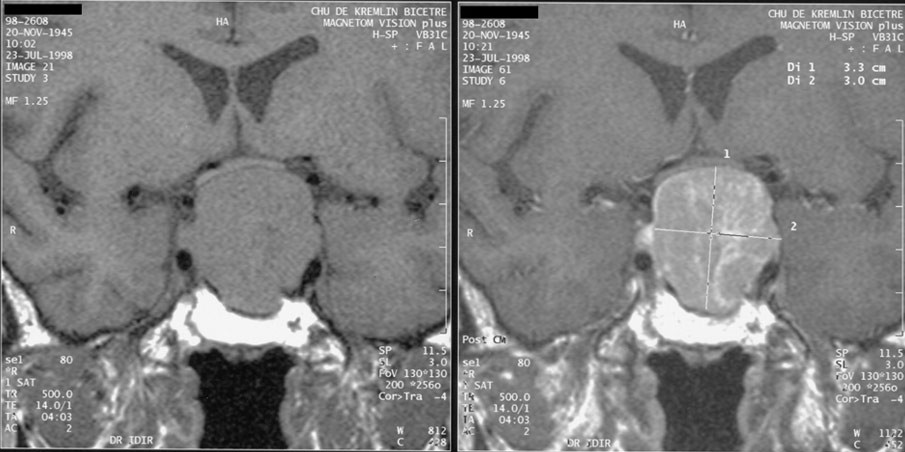
Acromegaly pituitary macroadenoma

In 2008, Suri was among the group of surgeons who performed a spinal cord stimulator implant on a quadriplegic, the first time such surgery was performed in India. In 2014, he was in the news for leading a surgical team in 2014 who removed a pituitary adenoma from Siddiqa Parveen, a 7'8" tall acromegaly patient noted by the Guinness Book of World Records the world's tallest woman in 2013, which posed difficulties due to the giant size of the patient. In 2018, when the first 3D brain surgery in India was performed at AIIMS Delhi, he was among the team of surgeons who performed it.

Suri has been involved in several clinical trials as the principal investigator. His studies have been documented by way of a number of articles and ResearchGate, an online repository of scientific articles has listed 249 of them. Besides he has contributed chapters to books published by others. He sits in the executive committee of the Indian Society of Neuro-Oncology and serves as an adjunct professor at ANSK School of Information Technology of the Indian Institute of Technology, Delhi. He is involved in imparting advanced neurosurgical training and conducts classes under programs such as DST/DBT/DHR Neurosurgery Skills Training Facility (NSTF), Neurosurgery Education and Training School (NETS) and Neurosurgery 3D Animation Graphics Video Editing Lab (NAGVEL) and was the organizing secretary of ISNOCON 2018, an international medical conference organized by the Indian Society of Neuro-Oncology in April 2018 at New Delhi.

== Awards and honors ==
Suri who passed the MBBS examination with a Gold Medal, has received the Outstanding Paper Award of The Spine Journal of the North American Spine Society, the Best Poster Award of the Neurological Society of India and the Best Paper Award of the Indian Society of Pediatric Neurosurgery. The Department of Biotechnology (DBT) of the Government of India awarded him the National Bioscience Award for Career Development, one of the highest Indian science awards in 2014.

== Selected bibliography ==
- Mishra, Shashwat; Soubam, Parkinson; Suri, Ashish; Dhingra, Renu; Mochan, Sankat; Lalwani, Sanjeev; Roy, TS; Mahapatra, AshokK (2018). "Standardization of the technique of silicon injection of human cadaveric heads for opacification of cerebral vasculature in Indian conditions". Neurology India. 66 (2): 439–443. doi:10.4103/0028-3886.227303. PMID 29547168. S2CID 3907078.
- Pasricha, Ribhav; Siddiqui, Saquib Azad; Suri, Ashish; Borkar, Sachin; Mahapatra, Ashok K (2018). "Disconnection vs excision? A ten year review of hypothalamic hamartomas". Neuro-Oncology. 20 (suppl_1): i7. doi:10.1093/neuonc/nox237.030. ISSN 1522-8517. PMC 5791596.
- Borkar, SachinAnil; Singh, Manmohanjit; Kale, ShashankSharad; Suri, Ashish; Chandra, PoodipediSarat; Kumar, Rajender; Sharma, BhawaniShankar; Gaikwad, Shailesh; Mahapatra, AshokKumar (2018). "Spinal cerebrospinal fluid drainage for prevention of vasospasm in aneurysmal subarachnoid hemorrhage: A prospective, randomized controlled study". Asian Journal of Neurosurgery. 13 (2): 238–246. doi:10.4103/1793-5482.228512. PMC 5898086. PMID 29682015.

== See also ==
- Hamartoma
- Aneurysm
