= Research and Humanities in Medical Education =

- Discipline: Humanities in medical education
- Language: English
- Edited by: Upreet Dhaliwal

Publication details
- Publisher: Medical Humanities Group at the University College of Medical Sciences and Guru Teg Bahadur Hospital (India)
- Open access: Yes

Standard abbreviations
- ISO 4: Res. Humanit. Med. Educ.

Indexing
- ISSN: 2350-0565

Links
- Journal homepage; Online archive

Research and Humanities in Medical Education (RHiME)is an open-access peer-reviewed academic journal published by the Medical Humanities Group at the University College of Medical Sciences and Guru Teg Bahadur Hospital, Delhi. It covers the role of the humanities in medical education, including the history of medicine, narrative medicine, graphic medicine, disability studies, and arts-based interventions, such as healing by means of Theatre of the Oppressed, poetry, literature, film, music and art. The journal was established in 2014. As of December 2022, the editor-in-chief is Upreet Dhaliwal.
