= NCPEDP MphasiS Universal Design Awards =

The NCPEDP-Mphasis Universal Design Awards are given every year on the eve of Independence Day of India to honour individuals and organisations doing exemplary work towards the cause of accessibility and thus ensuring a life of equality and dignity for persons with disabilities.

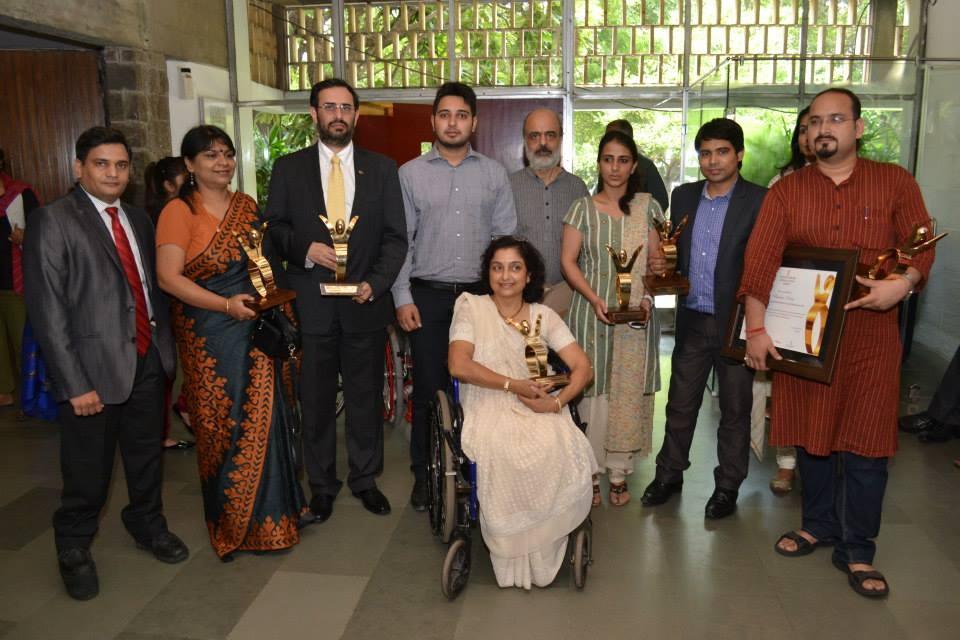
Winners of the NCPEDP MphasiS Universal Design Awards 2013 for exemplary work in the field of disability

In order to spread awareness on Universal Design and to popularise this concept, National Centre for Promotion of Employment for Disabled People (NCPEDP), with the support of Mphasis, instituted these award in 2010.

Every year, these are given away in 3 categories: People with disabilities; Working Professionals' and Corporates or Organizations.

Awardees are not financially compensated.

== NCPEDP-Mphasis Universal Design Awards, 2022 ==
Category	Awardees
Persons with Disabilities	Lalit Kumar, Evara Foundation Vidhya V, Vision Empower Soundarya Kumar Pradhan
Working Professionals	Teresa Antony Alappatt, Chetna Trust Robin Tommy, Inclusys Foundation Nilesh Panchal, Navjeevan Training Center Joe John George, Special Jury Award Diana Vincent, Special Jury Award
Companies/Organisations	Kerala School for the Blind Accenture Solutions Private Limited Neomotion Assistive Solutions The Department of Social Welfare, Women and Child Development, Chandigarh Administration Indian Spinal Injuries Center, Special Jury Award
Javed Abidi Public Policy Award	Merry Barua, Action for Autism

== NCPEDP-Mphasis Universal Design Awards,2020 ==
Category	Awardee
Persons with Disabilities	Mr Ravindra Rambhan Singh, Radio Udaan Raghavendra Satish Peri Dr. Vikrant Sirohi, Haridwar, Uttarakhand
Working Professionals	Mr. Adarsh Hasija, Bengaluru, Karnataka Mr. Anupam Kumar Garg, Noida, Uttar Pradesh Mr. Sandeep D. Ranade, NaadSadhana Mr. Naveen Kumar M, Chennai, Tamil Nadu, Developed child standing wheelchair
Companies/Organisations	Tactopus Learning Solutions Pvt. Ltd. Kidaura Innovations Pvt. Ltd. True Consulting Services Pvt Ltd Flexmotiv Technologies Pvt. Ltd.

== NCPEDP-Mphasis Universal Design Awards,2019 ==
Category	Awardee
Persons with Disabilities	Mr. Aneesh Karma Nekram Upadhyay, HOD, Assistive Technology, Indian Spinal Injuries Centre Rajesh Sharad Ketkar
Working Professionals	Rajni Kant Singh, Physiotherapist Prashant Gade, Social Entrepreneur Kunaal Prasad and Dipti Prasad, created XL Cinema, AD MOVIES Ankita Gulati, Founder, TouchVision
Companies/Organisations	SM Learning Skills Academy for Special Needs Private Limited National Institute of Open Schooling(NIOS) Big Bazaar Robert Bosch Engineering & Business Solutions Private Limited BleeTech Innovations Private Limited

== NCPEDP-Mphasis Universal Design Awards,2018 ==
Category	Awardee
Persons with Disabilities	Dr. Alim Chandani, Associate Vice President, Centum GRO Initiative Dhananjay Bhole, Academic Co-ordinator, Center for Inclusive Education and Accessibility, SavitribaiPhule Pune University Harish Kumar, Founder, Ability on Wheels
Working Professionals	Dr. JS Arora, General Secretary, National Thalassemia Welfare Society Tigmanshu Bhatnagar, Guest Faculty, Department of Design, IIT - Delhi Vishal Kapoor, Chief Design Officer, Future Enterprise Limited
Companies/Organisations	Election Commission of India EzyMov Solution Pvt. Ltd. Humanity Welfare Organization Helpline ORKIDS Foundation

== NCPEDP-Mphasis Universal Design Awards,2017 ==
Category	Awardee
Persons with Disabilities	Aqil Chinoy, Vice-chairman of Yuva Association of the Deaf Dr. Homiyar Mobedji, Country Representative for Benetech Suvarna Raj from IGNOU Vivek Mehta, Founder, CEO of DeafEasy
Working Professionals	Hemang Mistry, Architect and Urban Designer Parikipandla Naraharin, IAS officer of the 2001 batch (Madhya Pradesh Cadre) Dr. Ramesh C. Gaur University Librarian, Jawaharlal University (JNU). Siddhant Chetan Shah, founder of Access For ALL
Companies/Organisations	GingerMind Technologies Pvt. Ltd. Kidaura Innovations Pvt. Ltd. Hear2Read Intuit

== NCPEDP-Mphasis Universal Design Awards, 2016 ==
Category	Awardee
Persons with Disabilities	Mr Danish Mahajan and Ms Divya Sharma, Radio Udaan Dr. Nirmita Narasimhan, Policy Director with the Centre for Internet and Society Mr Sathasivam Kannupayan, co-founder, Enabled.in
Working Professionals	Mr Prem Nawaz Khan Maraikayar, front end Engineer, PayPal Inc Dr. Sandeep Sankat, Associate Professor, School of Planning and Architecture, Bhopal Dr. Sujatha Srinivasan, Associate Professor, IIT Madras
Companies/Organisations	IndiGo National Informatics Centre (NIC) NewzHook - A brand of Barrierbreak Solutions Pvt. Ltd. Planet Abled SAP Labs India Pvt. Ltd. University of Hyderabad

== NCPEDP-Mphasis Universal Design Awards,2015 ==
Category	Awardee
Persons with Disabilities	Ms Abha Khetarpal, Cross the Hurdles mobile application Ms Priti Shah Soni, CEO, Deaf Can Foundation (DCF) Mr Sandeep Kumar, Customer Service Officer, IndiGo Airlines SPECIAL MENTION Simon George, Founder-Chairman of Prathyasha Foundation
Working Professionals	Ms Archana Konwar, Student Prof. M. Balakrishnan, IIT Delhi
Companies/Organisations	Accenture Services Pvt. Ltd. D J Academy of Design Indraprastha College for Women, University of Delhi Mindtree Ltd. Sightica Solutions SPECIAL MENTION H&R Johnson (India)

== NCPEDP-Mphasis Universal Design Awards,2014 ==
Category	Awardee
Persons with Disabilities	Mr Prashant Madhukar Naik, Assistant Manager, Union Bank of India
Working Professionals	Mr Arun C Rao, President, Welfare Association of Sign Language Interpreters in India Mr G. Gopalakrishna, a specialist in the field of electro-chemistry, polymer-chemistry and a technologist Prof. Kavita Murugkar, B.N. College of Architecture (B.N.C.A.), Pune
Companies/Organisations	CHILDLINE India Foundation Cisco Systems India Pvt. Ltd. Joseph Eye Hospital Kickstart Services Pvt. Ltd. Wipro Ltd. Working Group for Disability Inclusive Microfinance

== NCPEDP-Mphasis Universal Design Awards, 2013 ==
Category	Awardee
Persons with Disabilities	Mr. Nekram Upadhyay, Rehabilitation Engineering Technologist & Head, Department of Assistive Technology, Indian Spinal Injuries Centre, Delhi Dr. Satendra Singh, Assistant Professor, University College of Medical Sciences and Coordinator, Enabling Unit, Delhi Mr. Srinivasu Chakravarthula, Senior Accessibility Program Lead, Consumer Quality & Engineering Services, PayPal
Working Professionals	Ms. Arathi Abraham, Principal Designer, 99 and 1 Design, Chennai Dr. Arun Mehta, President, Bidirectional Access Promotion Society, Delhi Mr. Bhushan Verma, CEO, GearCraftSolutions, Delhi
Companies/Organisations	HANDICARE - Indian Association of Persons with Disabilities, Lucknow Kriyate Design Solutions Pvt. Ltd., Delhi NCR Corporation India Pvt. Ltd., Mumbai School of Planning and Architecture, Bhopal

== NCPEDP-Mphasis Universal Design Awards,2012 ==
Category	Awardee
Persons with Disabilities	Dipendra Manocha, Developing Countries Coordinator and Lead of Training and Tech. Support, DAISY Consortium and Managing Founder Trustee, Saksham Trust
Working Professionals	Abhishek Syal, Founder, Managing Trustee, Act to Rise for Innovation in Special Education (ARISE) Prof. Prabhat Ranjan, Professor, Dhirubhai Ambani Institute of ICT, Gandhinagar, Gujarat R. R. Joshi, Director, Modular Infotech Pvt. Ltd., Pune Prof. Rachna Khare, Professor and Co-ordinator of Centre for Human Centric Research (CHCR), School of Planning and Architecture, Bhopal
Companies/Organisations	Indian Institute of Management, Bangalore Microsoft Corporation India Pvt. Ltd National Institute of Open Schooling Sri Vishnu Educational Society Travel Another India

== NCPEDP-Mphasis Universal Design Awards,2011 ==
Category	Awardee
Persons with Disabilities	Mr. Arvind Ramesh Prabhoo, Proprietor, Access4all, Mumbai Mr. Prasant Ranjan Verma, Freelance Access Consultant and ICT Trainer for people with visual impairment, New Delhi Mr. Shrirang Prakash Sahasrabudhe, Accessibility Specialist, Product Technical Lead, Infosys Limited, Pune
Working Professionals	Prof. Abir Mullick, Fulbright Nehru Scholar in Residence, National Institute of Design, Ahmedabad and Professor, Georgia Institute of Technology, USA. Mr. Anupam Basu, Professor, Department of Computer Science and Engineering, IIT Kharagpur. Mr. P.J. Mathew Martin, Extension Service Asst. (Mass Media), Ali Yavar Jung National Institute for the Hearing Handicapped, Mumbai.
Companies/Organisations	Accessible Systems, Mumbai. Lemon Tree Hotels Pvt. Ltd. Select Citywalk (Select Infrastructure Pvt. Ltd.), New Delhi. TBox Apps (Therapy Box), U.K. & UniqMove, Indore.

== NCPEDP-Mphasis Universal Design Awards,2010 ==
Category	Awardee
Persons with Disabilities	Imtiyaz Ahmed Kachvi, Ranibennur, Karnataka Dr. Sam Taraporevala, Director, Xavier's Resource Centre for the Visually Challenged, Mumbai Sunita I. Sancheti, NINA Foundation, Mumbai
Working Professionals	Ferdinand J. Rodricks Gaurav Raheja, IIT Roorkee M. S. Raju, Vision Aid Charitable Society
Companies/Organisations	ITC Royal Gardenia, Bengaluru Sightsavers Yahoo! India Research & Development Wipro Ltd.
