= Infinite Ability =

- Founded: 2011
- Type: Disability Organization
- Location: UCMS, Delhi, India
- Key people: Dr Satendra Singh
- Website: Infinite Ability

Infinite Ability is a special interest group on disability within the Medical Humanities Group of the University College of Medical Sciences (University of Delhi). It was founded by Dr Satendra Singh in 2011. The main purpose behind the formation of the group was the promotion and coordination among medical persons with disabilities of medical humanitarian approaches that would focus on four competency-based learning objectives of narrative medicine: graphic medicine; interpersonal and communication skills; patient care, and professionalism.

The mission of the group is to explore disability through disability studies and creativity and to achieve it the group organized the first ever Theatre of the Oppressed workshop for medical students in India. The group was also instrumental in organizing a unique 'Blind with Camera' workshop for the visually impaired and blind students of University of Delhi in 2012. The workshop by Partho Bhowmick was followed by a two-week-long exhibition of photographs taken by visually impaired in accessible format.

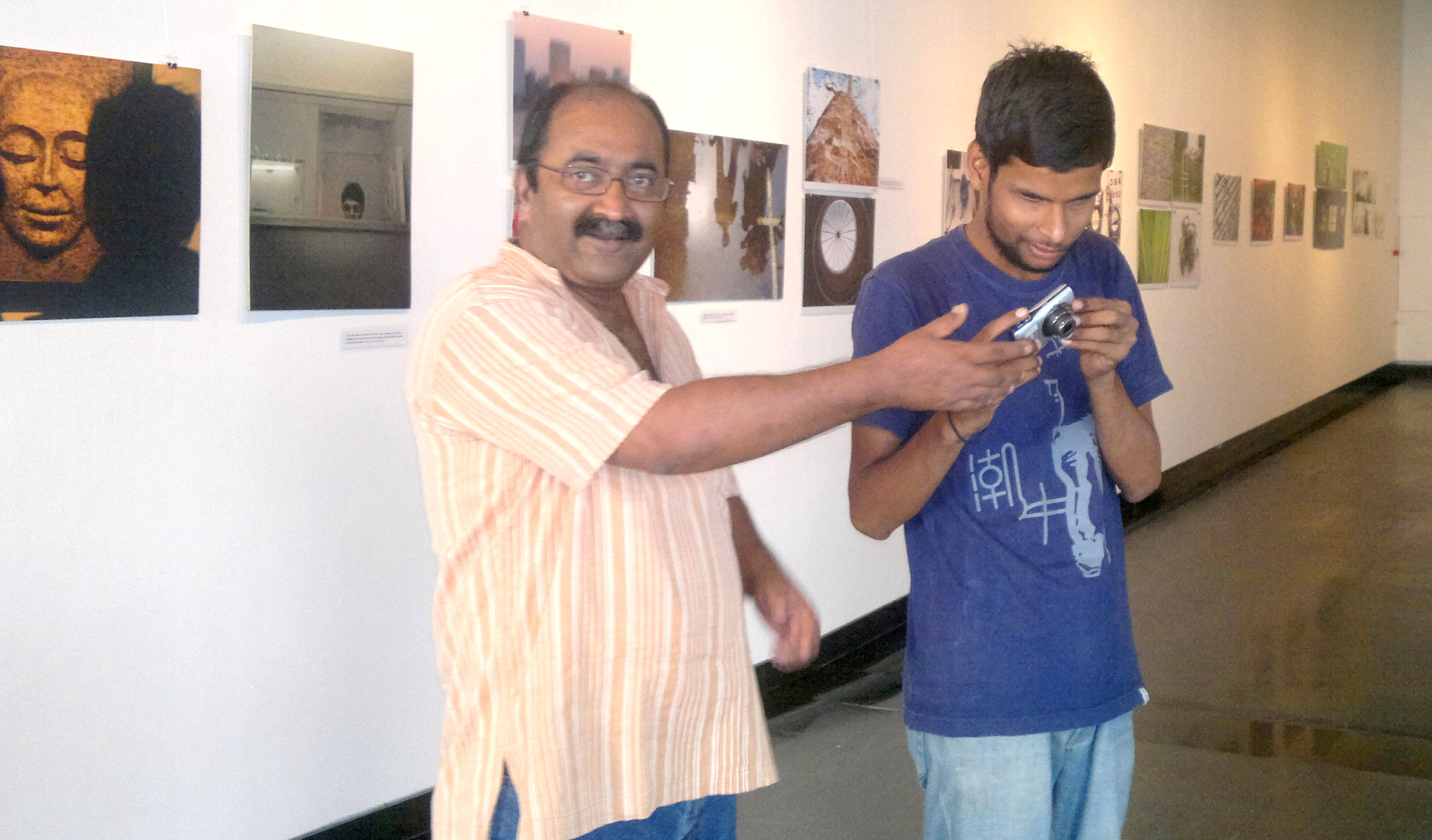
Blind with Camera workshop done by Partho Bhowmick and organised by Infinite Ability at New Delhi.

Dr Satendra Singh, founder of the group and Coordinator of the Enabling Unit, challenged the erroneous correlation of Jonas Salk's birthday with World Polio Day. His publication in the journal 'Vaccine' clears the air with appropriate references and contributes to correction of literature. His persistent advocacy also lead Medical Council of India to send directives to all the medical institutions in India to make the medical institutions 'accessible' to persons with disabilities.
