= Jian Shen =

American orthopedic surgeon

- Known for: Endoscopic and minimally invasive spine surgery
- Awards: Parviz Kambin Award (2019)

Academic background
- Education: Tsinghua University (BA); Cornell University Medical College (MD); Cornell University Graduate School of Medical Sciences (PhD)

Academic work
- Institutions: The Endoscopic Spine Institute of New York; Shen-Spine; SUNY Upstate Medical University; Adirondack Spine Institute

Jian Shen is an American orthopedic surgeon specializing in fully endoscopic and minimally invasive spinal surgery. He is a founding partner of The Endoscopic Spine Institute of New York and founder of the Shen-Spine practice. He previously served as a clinical associate professor at SUNY Upstate Medical University.

== Early life and education ==
Shen was born in China. He earned a Bachelor of Arts in biology and computer science from Tsinghua University in Beijing, China. He later completed an MD at Cornell University Medical College and a PhD in pharmacology at the Cornell University Graduate School of Medical Sciences in New York City.

Shen completed a general surgery internship at the Mayo Medical Center in Rochester, Minnesota, followed by an orthopedic surgery residency and physician-scientist research fellowship at Wake Forest University Baptist Medical Center from 2002 to 2007. Shen subsequently completed a spine surgery fellowship at the University of California, San Francisco in 2010–2011.

== Career ==
Shen is board-certified in orthopedic surgery by the American Board of Orthopaedic Surgery and is a Fellow of the American Academy of Orthopaedic Surgeons (FAAOS). He is a founding member of the International Society of Endoscopic Spine Surgery and a member of the North American Spine Society, the Society for Minimally Invasive Spine Surgery, the International Society for the Advancement of Spine Surgery, AO Spine, and the Minimally Invasive Neurosurgical Society.

Shen founded Shen-Spine, which operates practices in Manhattan, Latham, and Amsterdam, New York, as well as Edison, New Jersey. He also serves as Medical Director of the Adirondack Spine Institute at Nathan Littauer Hospital in Gloversville, New York. He previously served as a clinical associate professor at SUNY Upstate Medical University and has been a visiting professor at the Medical University of South Carolina and Weill Cornell Medical College.

Shen developed an endoscopic operative protocol called enVision Spine Surgery, in which procedures are performed through sub-centimeter incisions to minimize disruption to muscles and ligaments.

In 2025, Shen co-founded The Endoscopic Spine Institute of New York (ESINY) with neurosurgeons Albert E. Telfeian, Sanjay Konakondla, and Travis Hill.

== Research ==
Shen has published peer-reviewed studies and book chapters on endoscopic and minimally invasive spine surgery, including a chapter in the fifth edition of Benzel's Spine Surgery. His published research includes work on transforaminal endoscopic discectomy for thoracic disc herniations and revision surgery for lumbar pseudarthrosis. In November 2025, Shen co-authored a study in the International Journal of Spine Surgery analyzing patient travel distances to ESINY as an indicator of demand for specialized endoscopic spine care.

== Awards and recognition ==
In 2019, Shen received the Parviz Kambin Award, presented by joimax and the Endoscopic Spine Academy (ESPINEA) in Salzburg, Austria, in recognition of contributions to transforaminal endoscopic spine surgery.
