= Palash Sen =

- Born: Lucknow, Uttar Pradesh, India
- Origin: Delhi, India
- Genres: Pop, Rock, Indipop, Hind Rock
- Occupations: Singer, Songwriter, Musician, Composer, Actor, Director, Physician
- Instruments: Lead vocals, Guitar
- Years active: 1998–present
- Member of: Euphoria

Palash Sen is an Indian singer, songwriter, musician, composer, physician, director and actor. He is known as the founder and frontman of India's rock/pop band Euphoria.

== Early life and education ==
Born in a family of doctors, he comes from a family of Rajvaidyas (Sen Sharma) and is the 17th generation physician of his family. He was born in Lucknow, brought up in Delhi. Earlier, he used to stay in Connaught Place's Railway Colony and Srinagar.

He did his schooling from St. Columba's School, Delhi. He was active in theatre and singing right from his school days and that's where he realised his singing capabilities. Thereafter he studied medicine at the University College of Medical Sciences (UCMS) and Guru Teg Bahadur Hospital, New Delhi, and received his M.B.B.S. and M.S. in Orthopedics.

== Career ==
While in college, Sen founded his band Euphoria. He had started composing songs from in college days and was writing them in English. His first composition is believed to be 'Heaven on the Seventh Floor' which was an ode to his college hostel room, on the seventh floor. After finishing college, Sen met DJ Bhaduri, and their friendship took off instantly. The duo have been working together ever since, and Sen regards DJ as the backbone of Euphoria. Euphoria's first release, 'Dhoom Pichuck Dhoom,' was a major commercial hit and received rave reviews from the critics worldwide.

Euphoria went on to become noted Indian band, with five hit studio albums, one compilation and seventeen music videos. Sen's Bollywood debut came with Filhaal... (2002) directed by Meghna Gulzar, which also starred Tabu and Sushmita Sen. Thereafter, he appeared in "And It Rained" segment of anthology film, Mumbai Cutting (2008). Sen has also composed an eight-and-a-half-minute song for the film, and Euphoria performed on it. Sen has done multiple television appearances, most notably FameX (2006), Channel V Popstars, MTV Rock On (with Euphoria, 2008), MTV Unplugged (with Euphoria, 2011), NDTV Greenathon (with Euphoria, 2012).

== Discography ==
=== Albums ===
- 1998 – Dhoom
- 2000 – Phir Dhoom
- 2003 – Gully
- 2006 – Mehfuz
- 2008 – ReDhoom
- 2011 – Item
- 2012 – Sharnaagat
- 2021 – Sale

=== Collaborations ===
Year	Song	Artist(s)	Notes
2005	"Mauka"	Indraneel Hariharan (featuring Sen)	
2010	"Candywalk"	Orange Street (featuring Sen)	
2011	"Zindagi"	Friday the 13th (featuring Sen)	
2021	"Saajna"	Collaboration with Akriti Kakar	
2021	"Saajna"	Collaboration with Dino James (Separate version)	
2021	"Baavra"	Collaboration with Kyna Sen	
2025	"Mahakal Chalo"	Collaboration with Akshay Kumar and Vikram Montrose	
2026	"Koi Naa"	Featuring Nazar Pandher Group (from album Dhoomsday)	
2026	"Tumse Mohabbat Hai"	Featuring Shalmali Kholgade	
2026	"Tu Bewafa"	Featuring Dhanji	
2026	"Ee Swapnangal (Dream Song)"	Featuring Jyotsna Radhakrishnan	
2026	"Manmaani"	Featuring Kinshuk Sen	
2026	"Winner"	Featuring Abhay Jodhpurkar	
2026	"Jobaab Dao"	Featuring Akriti Kakar	
2026	"Aapki Duaa"	KK featuring Euphoria	

== Filmography ==
- Filhaal (Actor) (2002)
- Aisa Yeh Jahaan (Actor) (2015)
- Jiya Jaye (Director) (2017)
- Iktarfa (Director) (2018)
- Jaane Khuda (Actor/Director) (2023)
- Guzel Kiz (Director) (2025)
- Marhaba (Actor/Director) (2026)
