= Trans People in India: A Decade After NALSA =

Trans People in India: A Decade After NALSA is a 2026 academic monograph by Indian academic and scholar Preeti Choudhary, published by Routledge. The book examines legal, social, and policy developments affecting transgender communities in India in the decade following the Supreme Court of India’s 2014 judgment in National Legal Services Authority v. Union of India. The book outlines phases of transgender activism in India, spanning grassroots mobilisation, legal advocacy, and policy critique following the 2014 ‘‘NALSA’’ judgment.

The book also engages with literary and historical dimensions of transgender existence in India by incorporating cosmogenic and scriptural narratives in its early chapters. In doing so, it situates transgender identities within broader Indian knowledge traditions and historical cultural frameworks.

The monograph draws on qualitative field research, interviews, and analysis of policy documents and administrative data, including material obtained through the Right to Information Act, 2005.

== Background ==
According to a feature published in ‘‘The New Indian Express’’, the author began engaging with transgender issues after observing hijra community rituals in Jaipur, Rajasthan in 2018, which later developed into sustained field-based research and policy analysis on transgender rights and welfare systems in India.

The same report notes that the work documents structural barriers faced by transgender individuals in accessing welfare systems and institutional support, particularly during the COVID-19 pandemic period.

The book also draws on the author’s COVID-19–era reporting on transgender communities in India, published in DailyO, ThePrint, and Fair Observer, which examined the impact of lockdowns on traditional livelihoods such as badhai and highlighted barriers in access to emergency relief and vaccination programmes.

== Content ==
The book examines the implementation of transgender rights in India following the ‘‘NALSA’’ judgment and the Transgender Persons (Protection of Rights) Act, 2019. It focuses on gaps between constitutional recognition and administrative implementation, particularly in relation to identity documentation, access to welfare schemes, and institutional processes.

=== Chapter Outline ===
The monograph is structured to trace both the historical timeline and current socio-legal challenges along with the policy-analysis and theoretical frameworks in the later chapters:

Chapter I: Introduction: Examines transgender identity by distinguishing it from biological sex and sexual orientation, and traces its historical and conceptual development. It situates transgender visibility within global and Indian movements, including the Stonewall Riots and Pride activism in India, and discusses the evolving meanings of terms such as “transgender” and “hijra” in the Indian context. The chapter further explores historical representations of gender diversity in South Asia, including scriptural and cosmological narratives and their presence in Mughal-era institutions, while also analysing the impact of colonial frameworks on the construction of transgender identities.

Chapter II: Making Themselves Count: Traces the trajectory of transgender existence from the colonial period to the present, outlining post-independence mobilisation and activism that culminated in the recognition of a "third gender" under Indian law. It introduces a four-phase periodisation of transgender activism and provides a legal timeline of key judicial interventions.

Chapter III: Educational Opportunities Post-NALSA: Examines the structural barriers and institutional discrimination that affect transgender youth in formal education, drawing on Right to Information (RTI) data from central educational bodies and universities. It highlights structural barriers such as data inconsistencies, limited affirmative action, and infrastructural exclusion, while also assessing policy frameworks including the National Education Policy 2020.

Chapter IV: Vocational Opportunities for Transgender Persons: Focuses on employment and vocational inclusion, analysing systemic exclusion from labour data systems, workplace discrimination, and limited access to skill development and financial support. It also evaluates legal protections and workplace frameworks, including the POSH Act.

Chapter V: Social Security and Legal Protections for Transgender Persons: Reviews social security provisions, including access to food security, housing, healthcare, and livelihood schemes, and analyses relevant legal frameworks. Highlights healthcare and housing disparities, including the community's heightened vulnerability to HIV. This section critically examines Indian prison manuals (such as the Delhi Jail Manual and the Bharatiya Nagarik Suraksha Sanhita), pointing to a lack of gender-sensitive medical protocols and protections against custodial abuse.

Chapter VI: Schemes and Implementation: Critically evaluates the implementation of welfare schemes and institutional mechanisms established after the "NALSA" judgment and the Transgender Persons (Protection of Rights) Act, 2019. It examines the functioning of welfare boards, grievance redressal systems, and national initiatives, categorising state-level implementation outcomes.

Chapter VII: Theorizing Transgender Realities Post NALSA and Transgender Persons (Protection of Rights) Act-2019: Relies on RTI data to analyze the underutilization of central welfare budgets, such as the SMILE scheme, and the low adoption rates of national transgender ID cards. The chapter critically evaluates the implementation of welfare schemes and institutional mechanisms established after the "NALSA" judgment and the Transgender Persons (Protection of Rights) Act, 2019. It examines the functioning of welfare boards, grievance redressal systems, and national initiatives, categorising state-level implementation outcomes. The chapter concludes the book by introducing two analytical frameworks—

"implementational disenfranchisement" referring to bureaucratic and procedural barriers that restrict access to rights and

"corrigible inequities"—to explain systemic gaps in policy execution. It presents empirical findings from a nationwide questionnaire survey and offers policy recommendations aimed at improving inclusion and addressing structural inequalities.

== Four Waves of Transgender Activism ==
The book divides the period of transgender activism into four waves of trans activism:, and .

- First Wave: Transvergence (1983-2009): Characterised by grassroots mobilisation against police violence, social stigma, and exclusion of hijra communities from public life.
- Second Wave: Transclaration (2007-2014): Focused on political recognition, including voter registration and electoral participation of transgender persons, as well as early representation in local and state politics.
- Third Wave: Transformation (2014-2020): Defined by legal activism and public interest litigation, culminating in the 2014 ‘‘NALSA’’ judgment recognising transgender persons as a “third gender” and Transgender Protection of Rights Act.
- Fourth Wave: Transintegration (2020-present): Marked by policy critique, implementation audits, and intersectional advocacy, including debates on horizontal reservations, documentation reforms, and inclusion of trans men and non-binary identities.

== Theoretical Framework ==
The book develops two analytical concepts to evaluate state policy and administrative practice in relation to transgender rights:

=== Implementational Disenfranchisement ===
“Implementational disenfranchisement” refers to structural and procedural barriers within administrative systems that limit access to rights and welfare benefits despite formal legal recognition. The concept highlights how documentation requirements, certification procedures, and institutional discretion can restrict the practical realization of constitutional rights.

=== Corrigible Inequities ===
“Corrigible inequities” refers to systemic inequalities embedded within governance and institutional frameworks that persist despite legal reforms. The concept suggests that such inequities can be addressed through administrative accountability, policy reform, and gender-sensitive institutional practices.

== Themes ==
The work addresses issues including access to education, healthcare, housing, and welfare schemes for transgender persons. It situates these within broader debates on gender identity recognition, administrative processes, and implementation of rights-based legislation in India. The book also contributes to the literary history of transgender existence through the contextualisation of transgender identities within Indian historical and cultural traditions, including references to cosmogenic and scriptural narratives alongside contemporary legal and policy frameworks.

Public discourse on transgender rights in India has similarly highlighted tensions between self-identification principles and bureaucratic certification requirements under existing legal frameworks.

== Contributors ==
The foreword of the book has been written by the NALSA petitioner, transactivist Laxmi Narayan Tripathi. The book also includes contributions from transgender activists, including Shreegauri Sawant, A. Revathi, Akkai Padmashali, Aqsa Shaikh, Gopi Shankar Madurai, Meera Parida, Mx Yashika, Pushpa Mai, Simran Shaikh Barucha, Santa Khurai, Shreegauri Sawant, and Zainab Patel who lent their voices in the afterword.

In the foreword, Laxmi Narayan Tripathi describes the book as “a powerful testament to the journey we have walked since that historic day,” and notes that it captures “the reality of what it means to be transgender in India in the years after legal recognition.” She further observes that while legal recognition marked by the ‘‘NALSA’’ judgment was significant, “society takes longer” to change and that structural barriers in areas such as healthcare, education, employment, and housing continue to persist.

== Publication ==
The book was published in 2026 by Routledge (Taylor & Francis Group) and is available in print and electronic formats.

== See also ==
- LGBT rights in India
- Transgender Persons (Protection of Rights) Act, 2019
- National Legal Services Authority v. Union of India
- Preeti Choudhary
