= Spine journal =

Spine journal may refer to:

- The Spine Journal
- Spine (journal)
