= Nand Nagri =

Nand Nagari
- Neighborhood of Delhi
- Location in Delhi, India
- Coordinates: 28.6973°N 77.3077°E
- Country: India
- State: Delhi

Languages
  - Official: Hindi
- Time zone: UTC+5:30 (IST)
- Urban Local Body: MCD

Nand Nagri is the administrative headquarters of both the North East Delhi district and Shahdara district in Delhi. It has several residential blocks from A to E. It is situated not far the from Uttar Pradesh border; people from mixed religions live harmoniously here.

== History ==
In 1977 this colony had a different name at that time some part Dilshad garden, Nand Nagri, Sundar Nagri are same but because of some reason they divide into three-part Janta flat, Sundar Nagri and Nand Nagri and also maximum Muslim population peoples live in Sundar Nagri, higher society people in Janta flat and maximum population of Hindu live in Nand Nagri.
