= Jiya Jaye =

Indian Hindi-language Short film

- Official poster (2017)
- Directed by: Palash Sen
- Written by: Dahlia Sen Oberoi
- Produced by: Royal Stag
- Starring: Kinshuk Sen; Sahiba Bali; Kashish Arora; Shahran Qayoom; Rajat Bhattacharya
- Cinematography: Gairik Sarkar
- Edited by: Hardik Singh Reen
- Music by: Palash Sen; Zubeen Garg; Mrinmaay Panji; Kaushal Sharma; Vinesh Deb Singh; Euphoria; Background Score: Aman Nath
- Distributed by: Royal Stag Barrel Select Large Short Films
- Release date: 21 September 2017
- Running time: 23 minutes
- Country: India
- Language: Hindi

Jiya Jaye (transl. Love Lives) is an Indian Hindi-language drama short-film directed by singer-songwriter Palash Sen and produced by Royal Stag. Featuring actors Kinshuk Sen and Sahiba Bali in their first digital project, Jiya Jaye depicts conflicted love that brings pain and turmoil leaving you with a feeling of despair. It follows the story of a young soldier who returns home after a few years of being at the front lines, and discovers that things are not how he had left them. It is a take on the current political climate in Kashmir. Music is composed by Palash Sen, Euphoria and Zubeen Garg.

== Plot ==
Set in the village of Kulgam in modern-day Kashmir, Lt. Shiv Raina returns home after two years of training to become a soldier. A happy-go-lucky fellow, Shiv is only coming home for one purpose: to meet the love of his life again, Inayat, and this time ask for her hand in marriage. When he gets home, he is greeted by a grim Inayat who has no answers to his questions about why she never responded to his letters. There is a clear sorrow on her face that Shiv chooses to overlook, and does his best to cheer her up. As time goes on, Inayat starts to remember why she fell in love with her childhood best friend, and starts to reciprocate his feelings.

As Shiv makes himself comfortable at Inayat's home, he asks the whereabouts of her brother Zahir, to which neither she nor her father respond. Their despondent looks indicate that something has gone wrong in the past couple of years but Shiv does not know what. As the story unfolds, Shiv meets Zahir, and finds out that he has joined the a group of terrorists who want to claim Kashmir to be theirs. Shiv is disappointed and tries to reason with Zahir who justifies his feelings towards his cause, and his utter disdain towards the Indian Army that he claims has raped Muslim women and murdered Muslim men. Realizing that there will be no middle ground between the two men, Inayat distracts them by offering them both some food.

The same night, Zahir tells Inayat to put poison in Shiv's morning coffee. Stuck between her love and her brother, she pleads with Zahir to spare Shiv's life, but Zahir does not listen to her. Shiv hears the entire conversation from his bedroom.

The next morning, Shiv wakes up, sad and hurt, thinking that Inayat might try and carry out her brother's plan. He has a long banter with Inayat who denies knowing anything about any poison. As the fight goes on, Zahir enters and confronts Shiv. They both question each other's motives, and Zahir pulls a gun out of his pocket. Angered, Shiv tells Zahir to shoot at him. Seeing this, Inayat is heartbroken and she runs to her room. Zahir and Shiv continue to fight, and amidst the hustle, Zahir accidentally pulls the trigger killing Shiv. Hearing the gunshot go off, Inayat and Zahir's father runs into the room to witness the murder that his son has just committed. He then runs to the backroom to find Inayat hanging from the ceiling fan.

== Cast ==
- Kinshuk Sen as Lt. Shiv Raina
- Sahiba Bali as Inayat
- Kashish Arora as Zahir
- Rajat Bhattacharya as Abba
- Shahran Qayoom as Shahran

== Release ==
The film was released by Royal Stag Barrel Select Large Short Films on 21 September 2017. A special screening event was held on the day of the release.

== Controversy ==
In October 2017, filmmaker Bhargav Saikia accused the director, Palash Sen, of plagiarism. "I am appalled to see an established and celebrated musician like Palash Sen using unethical and illegal means to present his first film as a director," Saikia said. "The makers of ‘Jiya Jaye’ have re-used shots from ‘Kaafiron Ki Namaaz’ without permission from my production company, Lorien Motion Pictures," he added. Palash Sen addressed the issue stating "We started our investigation and found out that the footage was indeed available in a folder called STOCK. We used it without any wrong intent or malice. We are first time filmmakers making a short film. Euphoria is known to have NEVER violated copyrights and were ourselves victims at various points. Making such a public noise made us wonder what was this guy looking for.. Was it publicity that he never got when his film released (We too just heard the name of his film) or money.. or attention.. ? we suspect this footage was put out in the public domain and the intent was malicious," the post read.
