= Albert E. Telfeian =

American neurosurgeon

- Known for: Ultra-minimally invasive endoscopic spine techniques; Awake endoscopic spine procedures

Academic background
- Education: Columbia University; Warren Alpert Medical School of Brown University (MD, PhD)

Academic work
- Institutions: Columbia University; Brown University; Rhode Island Hospital; Hasbro Children's Hospital; Texas Tech University Health Sciences Center; Children's Hospital of Philadelphia

Albert E. Telfeian is an American neurosurgeon specializing in endoscopic spine surgery. He is a founding partner of the Endoscopic Spine Institute of New York (ESINY) and a faculty member in the Department of Neurosurgery at Columbia University. He is known for his work in ultra-minimally invasive endoscopic spine techniques, including awake endoscopic spine procedures.

== Early life and education ==
Telfeian earned his undergraduate degree from Columbia University and his MD and PhD through the combined MD–PhD program at the Warren Alpert Medical School of Brown University, graduating in 1993. He completed a postdoctoral fellowship in epilepsy electrophysiology at Yale University and a neurosurgical residency at the Hospital of the University of Pennsylvania from 1995 to 2001. He later completed fellowships in spine and functional epilepsy surgery at the Centre Hospitalier Universitaire Vaudois in Switzerland and in pediatric neurosurgery at the Children's Hospital of Philadelphia.

== Career ==
Telfeian began his academic career as an assistant professor of neurosurgery at the Children's Hospital of Philadelphia and later served as an associate professor of neurosurgery at Texas Tech University Health Sciences Center.

In 2012, he was appointed director of pediatric neurosurgery at Hasbro Children's Hospital in Providence, Rhode Island. At Brown University and Rhode Island Hospital, he became director of minimally invasive endoscopic spine surgery and later director of the Center for Minimally Invasive Endoscopic Spinal Surgery. He also served as Vice Chair for quality improvement in the Department of Neurosurgery and held the rank of associate professor, later Professor, of Neurosurgery at the Warren Alpert Medical School.

In 2025, Telfeian moved to New York City as a founding partner of ESINY and joined the neurosurgery faculty at Columbia University. At ESINY, he focuses on endoscopic treatment of herniated discs, lumbar foraminal stenosis, sciatica, and revision spinal procedures.

Telfeian serves as deputy editor of the International Journal of Spine Surgery and sits on the editorial boards of other spine and pain journals.

== Research ==
Telfeian has published research on epilepsy, functional neurosurgery, and spinal surgery, with a focus on ultra-minimally invasive endoscopic techniques.

ESINY credits him with performing the world's first awake endoscopic spine tumor surgery and developing techniques and protocols for outpatient awake spinal procedures.

== Awards and recognition ==
In 2011, Newsweek named Telfeian one of the United States' 15 leaders in neurosurgery. He has received the American Association of Neurological Surgeons Stereotactic and Functional Neurosurgery Research Award, the American Epilepsy Society Young Investigator Award, and the J. Kiffin Penry Pediatric Epilepsy Award. In addition, he received the Parviz Kambin Award and the Parviz Kambin Lifetime Achievement Award for contributions to endoscopic spine surgery.

Telfeian is a fellow of the American Association of Neurological Surgeons. He is also a member of the Congress of Neurological Surgeons, the Society for Minimally Invasive Spine Surgery, and the North American Spine Society.
