= Raman Kapur =

Indian acupuncturist

- Born: Ajmer, Rajasthan, India
- Occupation: Medical acupuncturist
- Known for: Acupuncture
- Spouse: Sunita Kapur
- Awards: Padma Shri; Medicina Alternativa Gold Medal; Rattan Shiromani Award
- Website: www.kapuracu.com

Raman Kapur is an Indian medical acupuncturist, author and the president of the Indian Society of Medical Acupuncture. He heads the Department of Acupuncture at Sir Ganga Ram Hospital, New Delhi and chairs the Institute of Acupuncture and Natural Medicines, an institution which runs acupuncture courses in affiliation with the Beijing University of Chinese Medicine. He is the author of three books on acupuncture; A Guide to Acupuncture and Tissue Cleansing System, Soft Lasers in Medical Practice and Acupuncture — Cure for Common Diseases and is a collaborator of the Indira Gandhi National Open University (IGNOU) for a postgraduate diploma course in acupuncture (PGDACP).

Kapur obtained a Bachelor of Medicine degree from the University of Medical Sciences, New Delhi in 1979. He started his own practice in New Delhi in 1982 and later joined Sir Ganga Ram Hospital as a consultant, eventually becoming the chairman of the Department of Acupuncture. In 1987, Medicina Alternativa conferred the degree of MD (acupuncture) on him.

Kapur went to the Salwan Public School, New Delhi. Besides the three books, Kapur has also written several articles on acupuncture therapy. He is a recipient of the Gold Medal from Medicina Alternativa and Rattan Shiromani Award of the Federation of Indian Chamber of Commerce and Industry (FICCI) and is a visiting professor at the International University of Alternate Medicines. The Government of India awarded him the fourth highest civilian honour of the Padma Shri, in 2008, for his contributions to medicine, making him the first acupuncturist to receive the award. He is married to Sunita Kapur, a medical doctor, acupuncturist and the co-author of his books.

== See also ==
- Colorpuncture
