= Planet Abled =

Travel company based in New Delhi, India

Planet Abled Private Limited
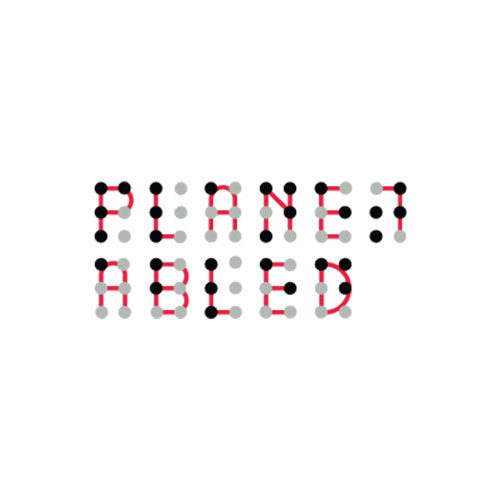
- Planet Abled logo
- Type: Private
- Industry: Travel
- Founded: January 1, 2016; 10 years ago in New Delhi, India
- Founder: Neha Arora
- Headquarters: New Delhi, India
- Area served: India

Planet Abled is a travel company based in New Delhi, India. The company provides travel to people with disabilities and the elderly. It has been recognized as one of the social innovators in travel space by Forbes.

== History ==
The company was founded in 2016 by Neha Arora, an electronics and communication engineering graduate. Her mother has polio from childhood and is a wheelchair-user while an infection rendered her father visually impaired when he was in college. There were instances when the family had traveled 1,000-2,000 miles only to realize that the place was not accessible. When she reached out to find the solution, she found none.

After spending 2 years researching and conducting feasibility studies, she quit her job with Adobe Inc. in November 2015 to start Planet Abled on January 1, 2016.

== Awards ==
- NCPEDP MphasiS Universal Design Awards 2016
- World Responsible Tourism Awards (WRTA) 2017: Best innovation by a Tour Operator (GOLD)
- Best innovative practice award at Zero Project Conference at United Nations, Vienna in 2018
- The Global Good Fund Fellowship 2019
