= National Voters' Day =

Indian observance on January 25

- Official name: National Voters' Day
- Observed by: India
- Significance: new voters are enrolled in the electoral rolls
- Date: 25 January
- Next time: 25 January 2027
- Frequency: annual
- First time: 25 January 2011
- Related to: Election Commission of India

National Voters' Day is celebrated annually in India on 25 January to mark the foundation day of Election Commission of India. It established by the Government of India in order to encourage more young voters to take part in the political process, and first celebrated 25 January 2011.

A meeting of the Union Cabinet, chaired by Prime Minister Manmohan Singh, approved a Law Ministry proposal to this effect, Information and Broadcasting Minister Ambika Soni told reporters. In this day rallies in government campus were going on. By observing the new voters, who have attained the age of 18 years, were showing less interest in getting enrolled in the electoral rolls, she said the level of their enrolment was as low as 20 to 25 per cent in certain cases. "In order to effectively deal with this problem, the Election Commission has decided to take up a vigorous exercise to identify all eligible voters attaining the age of 18 years as of January 1 every year in each of the 8.5 lakh polling stations across the country," she said.

Such eligible voters would be enrolled on time and handed over their Electoral Photo Identity Card (EPIC) on January 25 every year, Soni said, adding this initiative is expected to give the youth a sense of empowerment, pride and inspire them to exercise their franchise.

The new voters would be provided with a badge with its logo "Proud to be a voter - Ready to vote", she said. The theme of NVD 2016 is ‘Inclusive and qualitative participation’ reiterating the commitment towards reaching out to the last voter and promoting informed and ethical voting. The slogan 'No Voter to be left behind' has been coined to further emphasis the focus on inclusiveness. The National Awards are being conferred for excellence, proficiency and innovation in election processes and procedures. These awards recognize contribution by election machinery, government department/agency/PSU, CSO and media said.

On the fourth National Voters Day, a disability activist Satendra Singh's RTI caught Election Commission of India off-guard when they were found violating Supreme Court orders to enfranchise voters with disability.
