= Danish Mahajan =

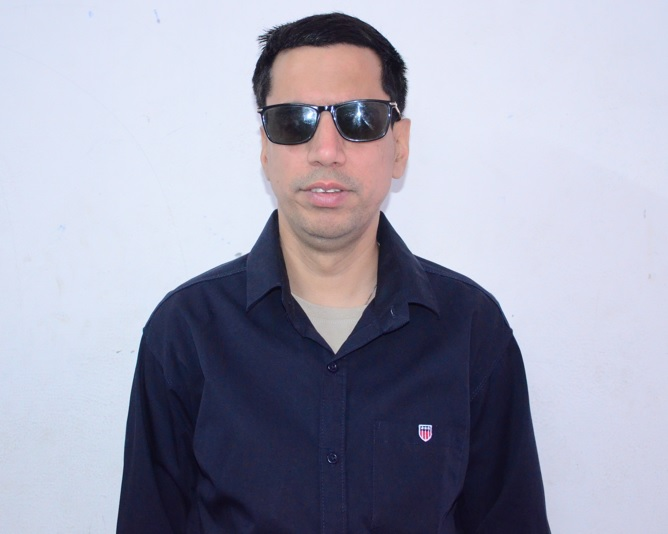
- Born: August 1, 1988 (age 38); Punjab, India
- Occupations: Radio jockey, journalist
- Known for: Radio Udaan
- Awards: National Award, CavinKare Ability Awards, NCPEDP MphasiS Universal Design Awards

Danish Mahajan is an Indian visually impaired radio jockey and journalist from Punjab. He is the founder of Radio Udaan, the first community radio station in India operated entirely by persons with disabilities.

In December 2024, Danish Mahajan was awarded the National Award for his remarkable achievements to the disabled community, to be conferred by the Honorable President of India. The Government of India declared Danish Mahajan, the winner of the National Award in the Shreshth Divyangjan category. He was also invited to the Independence Day dinner hosted by the President of India, where he met Prime Minister Narendra Modi.

Danish lost his eyesight at 14 and has since emerged as a steadfast advocate for individuals with impairments.

== Radio Udaan ==
Radio Udaan is the first community radio station in India operated entirely by persons with disabilities. It was founded by Danish Mahajan in 2014.

With over 1,500 episodes of his renowned show Badalta Daur, Danish has become a leading voice for disability rights. Radio Udaan has partnered with more than 250 events as a media ally to government agencies and NGOs, amplifying awareness about disability inclusion. Danish Mahajan has reached over 50,000 monthly listeners on "Radio Udaan" till January 2025.

Radio Udaan is the first online disability community radio station in India to be registered with the India Book of Records.

== Visually Empowerment ==
In February 2025, Danish Mahajan organized a Fashion show named "MR. and MS. Beauty pageant 2025" only for blind category. The event was held in Punchkula, Chandigarh.

In December 2017, Danish Mahajan with the Radio Udaan crew founded the Udaan Empowerment Trust to empower visually impaired individuals and provide them with limitless options.

Danish’s efforts played a pivotal role in the advocacy and awareness of the Rights of Persons with Disabilities (RPWD) Act, including the creation of an informative chapter-wise series on the Act.

== Awards and recognition ==
- National Award 2024 by President of India
- NAB Madhu Sharma Young Achiever Award (2020)
- 17th CavinKare Ability Award for Eminence (2019)
- NCPEDP MphasiS Universal Design Awards 2016
