= Preeti Choudhary =

Indian academic and literary scholar

- Born: India
- Citizenship: Indian
- Occupations: Academic, literary scholar, author
- Years active: 2014–present
- Employer(s): University of Rajasthan, Jaipur
- Known for: Gender studies, transgender studies, queer theory, medical humanities
- Title: Assistant Professor, Department of English

Academic background
- Education: Ph.D. (English Literature), University of Rajasthan; M.Phil. (English Language Teaching), Banasthali University; M.A. (English Literature), Banasthali University
- Thesis: Socio-cultural Perspectives in Women's Writing from Iraq (Ph.D.)

Academic work
- Discipline: English literature, gender studies
- Sub-discipline: Transgender studies, queer theory, postcolonial literature
- Institutions: University of Rajasthan
- Main interests: Gender representation, transgender identity, medical humanities, folklore studies
- Notable works: Trans People in India: A Decade after NALSA (2026)

Preeti Choudhary is an Indian academic and literary scholar. She is an Assistant Professor in the Department of English at the University of Rajasthan, Jaipur. Her research focuses on gender studies, transgender studies, queer theory, postcolonial literature and medical humanities. She is the author of Trans People in India: A Decade after NALSA (2026), published by Routledge (Taylor & Francis).

Choudhary has been the subject of independent media coverage, including a feature profile in The Sunday Standard (The New Indian Express), which documents her academic work and engagement with transgender rights and policy advocacy in India.

== Academic career ==
Choudhary has served as an Assistant Professor in the Department of English at the University of Rajasthan since 2014. She has undertaken academic and administrative responsibilities within the University of Rajasthan system, including roles related to institutional quality assurance and departmental leadership.

She has served as a member of academic and advisory panels associated with state and national-level government bodies related to higher education, gender and social welfare initiatives.

== Education ==
Choudhary completed her doctoral studies in English Literature at the University of Rajasthan in 2016. She holds an M.Phil. in English Language Teaching from Banasthali University, where she was awarded a gold medal, and an M.A. in English Literature from the same institution.

== Research ==
Her research spans interdisciplinary areas including transgender studies, gender theory, medical humanities and postcolonial literary studies.

She has led funded research projects, including a policy research project supported by the Indian Council of Social Science Research (ICSSR) and the Ministry of Human Resource Development (MHRD) focusing on transgender issues, and another project supported by the Rajasthan State AIDS Control Society (RSACS) and the National AIDS Control Organisation (NACO) on injecting drug users (IDUs).

Her work also includes methodological contributions to qualitative research in gender studies. Her case study on engaging with hijra communities in India, published by SAGE, examines research strategies and ethical approaches in working with marginalised gender groups.

Her work engages with questions of representation, institutional frameworks and public policy relating to gender and marginalised communities.

== COVID-19 writing ==
During the COVID-19 pandemic, Choudhary contributed opinion and analytical pieces to platforms including DailyO, ThePrint and Fair Observer. Her writings have surfaced the socio-economic impact of lockdowns on transgender communities in India, especially the disruption of traditional livelihoods such as badhai and the exclusion of undocumented transgender people from emergency relief measures. She also analysed disparities in access to vaccination, highlighting administrative barriers such as documentation requirements, digital access limitations and the classification of transgender people under generic "Others" categories in official systems.

== Academic roles and peer review ==
Choudhary has also held editorial responsibilities for academic journals and university publications in English literature and gender studies and serves as a peer reviewer for international academic journals indexed in major scholarly databases, including Scopus and Web of Science.

She has delivered invited lectures and keynote addresses and has also chaired academic sessions at national and international conferences in India and abroad.

== Policy and social contributions ==
Dr. Choudhary has also been involved in policy discussions and advocacy around transgender rights and gender inclusion in India. She has been involved in consultations with government bodies and welfare boards including with Rajasthan Transgender Welfare Board.

She has worked with NGOs on gender sensitization programs and has also been involved in academic and community-based work on gender minorities in Rajasthan.

She has also written policy-oriented research reports submitted to state and national bodies on issues of transgender welfare and public health.

== Theoretical frameworks and concepts ==
Choudhary's work develops a set of analytical frameworks within transgender studies and medical humanities that interrogate the gap between legal recognition, institutional practice and life experience. In Trans People in India: A Decade after NALSA, she uses the idea of implementational disenfranchisement to expose the disconnect between the formal legal recognition of transgender persons and the patchy or partial implementation of rights and welfare provisions in practice.

The same work also engages with the idea of corrigible inequities, referring to structural inequalities that are formally acknowledged within policy frameworks but persist through institutional delays, administrative gaps and uneven enforcement mechanisms.

In her work on medical humanities, Choudhary has also employed the phrase medical phallogocentrism to refer to the systems of medical knowledge that are constituted by historically male-centred epistemologies, which can marginalize or fail to recognize other symptomologies and embodied experiences, especially those of women and gender minorities. Her research in this work is located within wider academic conversations around medical gaslighting and gender bias in healthcare systems, where patients' experiences, especially those of women and marginalized groups, can be dismissed or inadequately addressed.

These conceptual frameworks are situated within broader scholarly discussions on structural exclusion, medical gaslighting and institutional bias in healthcare and governance systems.

== Publications ==
=== Books ===
- Trans People in India: A Decade after NALSA (Routledge, 2026)

=== Other works ===
Choudhary has authored and edited multiple academic publications and contributed to peer-reviewed journals in the areas of gender studies, literary theory and cultural studies.

== Public engagement ==
Choudhary's academic work extends to public scholarship and policy engagement. According to The Sunday Standard, her research and fieldwork with transgender communities led to policy recommendations and advocacy interventions on healthcare access, legal recognition, and institutional inclusion.

The same coverage highlights her engagement with grass-root level initiatives and her stance on highlighting structural inequalities faced by transgender persons in India.

== Recognition ==
Choudhary has also been awarded for her academic and policy work on transgender issues, including a state-level award by the Government of Rajasthan.

She has been invited as a resource person and official guest at multiple events hosted by governmental and non-governmental organisations like the National Institute of Social Defence (NISD), the District Legal Services Authority (DLSA) and many others, recognising her contribution to the community.

She is also a core committee member of the Queer Gulabi Pride March, a pride event attended by thousands of members of the LGBTQI community worldwide.
