= Sanjay Asthana =

Alzheimer's disease researcher

- Education: University College of Medical Sciences University of Delhi, New Delhi, India
- Known for: Alzheimer's disease research
- Scientific career
- Workplaces: University of Wisconsin-Madison

Sanjay Asthana is Chief of the Division of Geriatrics and Gerontology at the University of Wisconsin School of Medicine and Public Health, and holds the Duncan G. and Lottie H. Ballantine Endowed Chair in Geriatrics. Since 2009, Asthana has also served as director of the Wisconsin Alzheimer's Disease Research Center.

In 2015, Asthana was appointed the first Associate Dean for Gerontology. He also holds an appointment at William S. Middleton Memorial Veterans Hospital, where he serves as the director of the Geriatric Research, Education and Clinical Center.

Asthana's father, an economist and diplomat for the United Nations, suffered from Alzheimer's disease, spurring Asthana to study the disease.

Asthana has participated in clinical trials of therapeutic interventions, including those testing the effects of soy isoflavones, vitamin E, and ramipril, finding that vitamin E may slow cognitive decline. Other recent work has focused on the possibility that insulin resistance may increase the risk of developing Alzheimer's disease or the progression of the disease.
