= Aqsa Shaikh =

Associate Indian professor and transgender rights activist

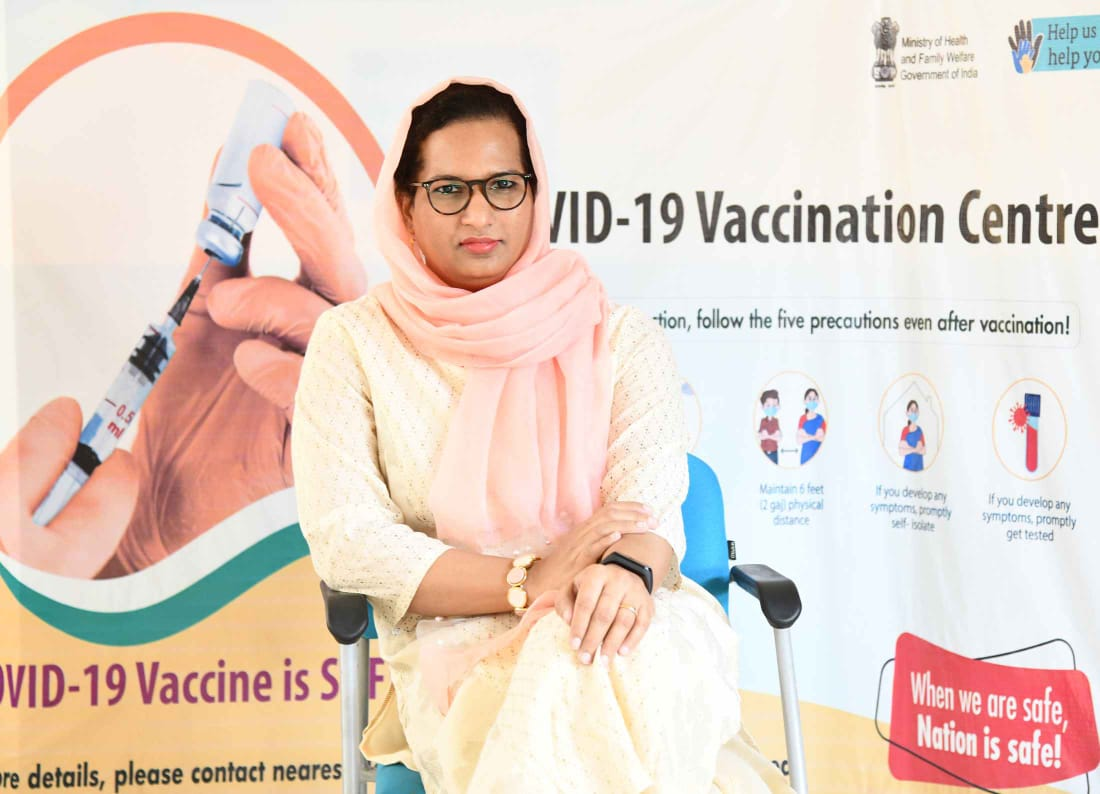
Aqsa Shaikh at a COVID-19 vaccination centre at Jamia Hamdard

Aqsa Shaikh (born c. 1983) is a Professor of the Department of Community Medicine in Hamdard Institute of Medical Sciences and Research, Jamia Hamdard, New Delhi. She is a transgender woman and a transgender rights activist.

== Early life and background ==
Shaikh was born in Islampura, southern Mumbai, where societal norms and gender expectations were deeply entrenched. From a young age, her gender identity did not align with the expectations imposed upon her as someone assigned male at birth. She faced discouragement and bullying for exhibiting gender variant behaviour, such as applying mehendi and playing with girls.

In 2003, while pursuing her medical education at King Edward Memorial Hospital and Seth Gordhandas Sunderdas Medical College, Shaikh began looking up medical literature of the time to understand her gender identity. She did not feel comfortable with the term "gender identity disorder", but identified as a trans woman.

== Gender transition and advocacy ==
Wishing to live socially as a woman, Shaikh came out to her parents. She sought medical and psychological support (including seeing a counsellor) and underwent hormone therapy and various gender-affirming surgical procedures, including breast augmentation. Throughout her transition, Shaikh discussed her experiences with her students and patients.

She is an educator at Jamia Hamdard, and has talked about her transition story in order to dismantle stigma and discrimination against transgender people in India, as well as encouraging greater visibility and recognition of transgender rights in India within society and religious communities.

In 2021, she became the first trans woman to head a COVID-19 vaccination centre in India. Shaikh, along with doctors Satendra Singh and Sanjay Sharma, successfully petitioned the Delhi Commission for Protection of Child Rights to recommend that the Delhi government ban medically unnecessary medical interventions on intersex children.
