= Chief Commissioner for Persons with Disabilities =

Government of India agency

The Office of the Chief Commissioner for Persons with Disabilities is a Government of India agency under the Ministry of Social Justice and Empowerment.

This has been set up under the Rights of Persons with Disabilities Act (RPDA), 2016 It is mandated to take steps to safeguard the rights of persons with disabilities. The Chief Commissioner is vested with the power of a civil court under the Code of Civil Procedure. There are separate Commissioners for State and Union Territories.

Rajesh Aggarwal, IAS, Secretary, Department of Empowerment of Persons with Disabilities, is the current Chief Commissioner. Prasanna Kumar Pincha was the first person with disability holding this post.

The Chief Commissioner has criticised the state government of Bihar for delays in implementing a State Commission.
