= Euphoria (Indian band) =

Indian pop rock band

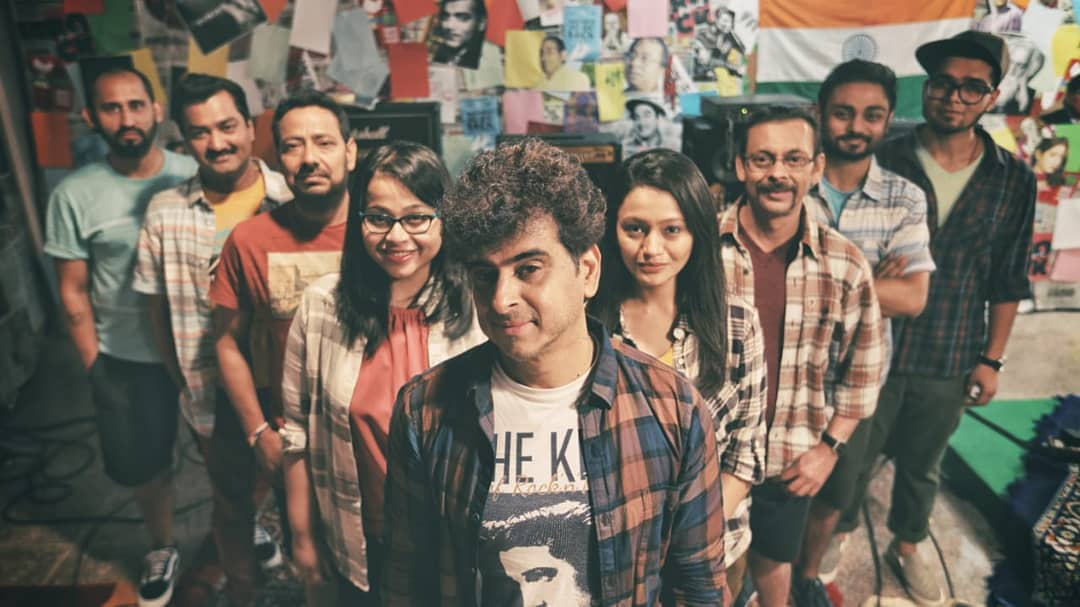
- Euphoria band members at the filming of their music video for the song "Alvida", in April 2018

Background information
- Origin: Delhi, India
- Genres: Pop rock; pop; indie pop
- Years active: 1998–present
- Labels: Archies Music; T Series; Saregama; Universal Music India; Universal Music Group; Dhoom Records
- Members: Palash Sen; Debajyoti Bhaduri; Rakesh Bhardwaj; Prashant Trivedi; Vaishali Barua; Vishal Mehta; Vishal Dixit; Aditya Shankar Benia; Amborish Saikia; Ashok Roy; Akshat Sharma; Jayashree Basu
- Website: www.dhoom.com

Euphoria is an Indian pop rock band formed by Palash Sen in 1998 in Delhi, India. The name "euphoria", is a term used in psychiatry to describe a feeling one gets in the state of mania, was decided upon by Sen, who at the time was a student of medicine at the University College of Medical Sciences, Delhi. Euphoria has released 7 studio albums. They have released 16 singles by adopting the DIY method, and embracing the digital revolution in the music industry. They were inducted into the Hall of Fame in 2012 by the Indian Recording Arts Academy at the Palm Expo in Mumbai. Alongside jaunty pop rock songs, Euphoria have also been known to produce music with a satirical message. Their 2011 album's title-track, "Item", pokes fun at Bollywood for its obsession with so-called 'item numbers', "Gumsum" was written as a letter to India's then-Prime Minister Manmohan Singh, whilst "Jeene Do" addresses the common man's frustration with terrorism and politics.

== Career ==
Initially rooted in English rock the band through its various line-up changes, found its calling in the sound of fusion rock music arrangements with Hindi lyrics and melodies. They released their debut album Dhoom in 1998.

=== Early years (1998–1999) ===
Euphoria was formed in 1998 by a then medical student Sen and his friends. Their first single was titled "Dhoom Pichuk Dhoom", and it had a popular music video, directed by filmmaker Pradeep Sarkar. Euphoria went on to become a noted Indian band, with five hit studio albums, one compilation and seventeen music videos.

=== "Halla Bol" music video (2016) ===
Euphoria launched their brand new single on 21 June 2016, co-written by Sen and Deekshant Sahrawat, "Halla Bol", also composed and led by as vocalist by Sen, describes the song as "the war cry of the meek, the quiet and the non-pretentious common man. This almost six-minute song features the band's commentary on India's various issues with spoofs on Arvind Kejriwal, Arnab Goswami, Vijay Mallya and Aamir Khan's 2014 film PK.

== Discography ==
=== Films ===
Euphoria composed the soundtrack for the 2010 Malayalam film Best of Luck.

=== Albums ===
Albums and singles of Euphoria are listed below:

- 1998 – Dhoom
- 2000 – Phir Dhoom
- 2003 – Gully
- 2006 – Mehfuz
- 2008 – ReDhoom
- 2012 – Sharnaagat
- 2021 – Sale
- 2026 – Dhoomsday

=== Singles ===
- 2001 – Mantra
- 2017 – Halla Bol
- 2018 – Alvida

=== Songs ===
- Dhoom Pichak Dhoom
- Sha Na Na
- Maeri
- Phir Dhoom
- Raja Rani
- Ab Naa Jaa
- Aana Meri Gully
- Sone De Maa
- Soneya
- Mehfuz
- Bhoola Sab
- Ram Ali
- C U Later
- Kabootar
- Item
- Sharnaagat
- Prabhuji
- Sheranwali Maa
- Maula Mere Maula
- Halla Bol
- Iktarfa
- Danger Babua
- Mujhse Kaha Naa Gaya
- Saajna
- Ladaaii
- Walk On
- Sale
- Saahiba
- Baavra
- Kesariya Baalmaa
- Khwaamkhaa
- Saajna
- I Like It

=== Collaborations ===
- 2004 – Jeet Lo Dil feat. Strings
- 2010 – Delhi Meri Jaan (for the Commonwealth Games 2010 New Delhi)
- 2019 – Saajna feat. Akriti Kakar
- 2021 - Saajna feat. Dino James
- 2021 - Baavra feat. Kyna Sen

== Key facts ==
Sen is also an actor, who acted in the Bollywood movie Filhaal. Also, Sen has starred in a film called Mumbai Cutting, in which he plays the lead role. Euphoria created the background score for this movie.
