= Enabling Unit =

The Enabling Unit, Equal Opportunity Cell is based at University College of Medical Sciences and Guru Teg Bahadur Hospital, Delhi. It ensures affirmative action’s concerning persons with disabilities including students, nonteaching staff, faculty as well as patients at UCMS. It is first such unit for students with disabilities in any medical institution in India.

== History ==
The Enabling Unit was created as per the University Grants Commission (India) guidelines and disability policy of University of Delhi. Dr Satendra Singh was appointed the Coordinator in 2011 who constituted an 'Equality and Diversity Committee' to include the disability perspective. All the members of this committee are persons with disabilities in line with the motto ‘Nothing About Us Without Us.’ The composition is also in conjunction with theme of United Nations' International Day of Persons with Disabilities 2011- “Together for a better

== Initiatives of the Enabling Unit ==
Accessibility of all the medical institutions in India

On the petition of Coordinator, Dr Satendra Singh, Chief Commissioner for Persons with Disabilities, under Ministry of Social Justice and Empowerment, Government of India instructed Medical Council of India to make all medical institutions in India accessible to persons with disabilities and submit a compliance report.

Accessible Automated Teller Machines (ATM’s)

Both the Bank of Baroda ATM and the Canara Bank ATM at University College of Medical Sciences and Guru Teg Bahadur Hospital were inaccessible to persons with disabilities. After a lengthy advocacy by Enabling Unit and directives from Chief Commissioner for Persons with Disabilities, both the respective Banks constructed ramps to make the ATM's accessible to wheelchair users.

Inccessible Post Offices in New Delhi

India Postal Services (trading as India Post) in New Delhi was found to be inaccessible when information under the Right to Information Act (RTI Act) by the Coordinator of Enabling Unit, Dr Satendra Singh, revealed that a majority of post offices in India's capital city are inaccessible to persons with disabilities.

Plea to simplify process of getting assistive devices from Indian Red Cross Society

Coordinator, Dr Singh, highlighted the complex procedure for availing free assistive devices from Indian Red Cross Society, Haryana Branch. The Indian Red Cross Society, Haryana State branch acknowledged the lacuna and vowed to simplify the procedure without accounting system.

Clearing air on World Polio Day commemorated to celebrate Salk's birthday

Coordinator of Enabling Unit challenged the erroneous correlation of Jonas Salk's birthday with World Polio Day. His publication in the journal 'Vaccine' clears the air with appropriate references and contributes to correction of literature.
