= Guru Tegh Bahadur Hospital =

Guru Teg Bahadur Hospital
- We Dare To Care

Geography
- Location: Dilshad Garden, Shahdara, East Delhi, Delhi, India
- Coordinates: 28.684°N 77.309°E

Organisation
- Care system: Personal
- Type: Teaching tertiary care general hospital
- Affiliated university: University College of Medical Sciences

Services
- Emergency department: Medicine, surgery, trauma, burns, gynecology, obstetrics, pediatrics
- Beds: 1700

History
- Founded: 1979

Links
- Website: Official website
- Lists: Hospitals in India

Guru Teg Bahadur Hospital (or GTBH or GTB Hospital) is a large memorial hospital named in honour of Guru Teg Bahadur, situated at Dilshad Garden, Shahdara, Delhi, India. The hospital is affiliated to and acts as a teaching hospital of the University College of Medical Sciences, University of Delhi.

GTBH was established in 1979 (fully functional in 1987) with a 350-bed capacity which has been expanded to 1700-beds. It is the first Delhi Government tertiary care hospital in the Trans-Yamuna area, catering to the East Delhi population as well as people from adjacent states.

== Location ==
The Guru Teg Bahadur Hospital is located in Dilshad Garden, Shahdara, East Delhi.

== History ==
The hospital was established in 1987 with 350 beds, as an associated teaching hospital attached to the University College of Medical Sciences, University of Delhi. In 2006 it was recorded to have near 1,000 beds. Later figures report a capacity of 1,700 beds.

UCMS was founded in 1971, due to the efforts of the Health Minister of New Delhi. It was proposed by the minister to provide medical education to every student who attained the eligibility criteria and wished to become a doctor. The criteria being stringent (minimum 60% aggregate), but it still caused a 100 or so students to be left out, even with the presence of two Medical Colleges in Delhi – MAMC and LHMC. That year classes began in the makeshift Department of Chemistry, Delhi University, North Campus. This was to become the UCMS of tomorrow. It then started having its clinical postings (practicals) at Meerut Medical College. Shortly, it was shifted to Safdarjung Hospital in South Delhi.

In 1986, it shifted to its present location at Dilshad Garden and was associated with Guru Teg Bahadur Hospital, a 1000 bedded institution, as its teaching hospital.

Thus GTBH actually became functional in 1986 though construction was over in 1979 and some departments began functioning before 1987.

== Facilities ==
- Anti Retroviral Treatment (ART)for HIV & AIDS treatment
- Out Patient Clinics
- Inpatient care (admissions)
- Emergency services
- Critical care
- Suraksha Clinic
- Specialist care
- Laboratory services
- Imaging services
- Medico legal aid
- Nodal Center under National Programs
- Teaching facilities
- Examination services

=== Outpatient clinics ===
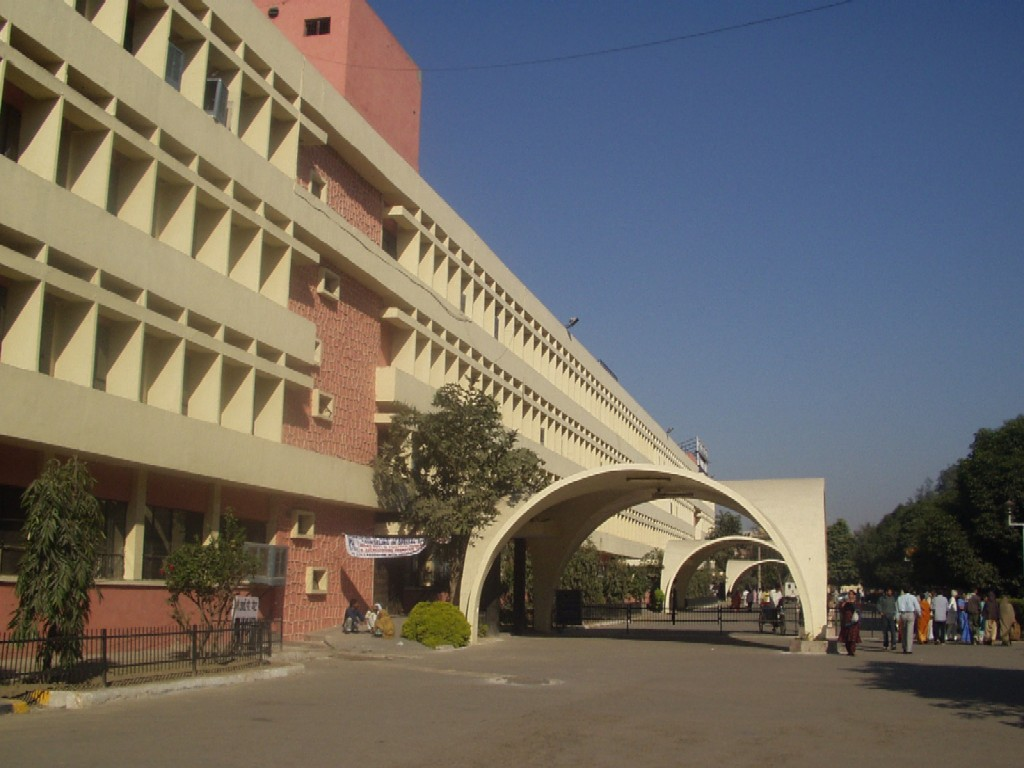
Guru Tegh Bahadur Hospital – entry to OPD – side

Outpatient clinics are held in the Outpatient Department. There are 3 floors (ground, 1st and 2nd floors). Each floor has approximately 100 rooms.
