= University College of Medical Sciences =

Constituent college of University of Delhi

Coordinates: 28°36′28.0332″N 77°8′21.7320″E

- Type: Government
- Established: 1971; 55 years ago
- Affiliations: National Medical Commission
- Academic affiliations: University of Delhi
- Budget: ₹495.5 crore (US$51 million) (FY 2024-25)
- Principal: Dr. Dheeraj Shah
- Academic staff: 196
- Students: 1402
- Undergraduates: 851
- Postgraduates: 551
- Location: Dilshad Garden, Shahdara, Delhi, India
- Campus: Urban
- Nickname: UCMS
- Website: Official website

University College of Medical Sciences (UCMS) is a public medical college in Delhi, India, affiliated with the University of Delhi. It is associated with Guru Teg Bahadur Hospital, which serves as the teaching hospital.

== History ==
The University College of Medical Sciences was founded in 1971 by efforts of the Health Minister of Delhi. The Health Ministry proposed to provide medical education to every student who qualified. Even with the presence of two medical colleges in Delhi, MAMC and LHMC, many students were denied the opportunity to study medicine. In 1971, classes for the new college started in the makeshift Department of Chemistry on the North Campus of University of Delhi. The students had their clinical postings for practicals at the Safdarjung Hospital for 125 students. Additional 50 students were sent to Lala Lajpat Rai Memorial Medical College, at Meerut in Uttar Pradesh. Shortly afterwards, UCMS moved to Safdarjung Hospital in South Delhi. In 1986, UCMS moved to its present location at Dilshad Garden and became associated with Guru Teg Bahadur Hospital.

On 5 April 2006, the Human Resources Development Minister of India, Arjun Singh, announced that the government intended to introduce reservations for Other Backward Classes at 27% in central institutions, including IITs, IIMs, NITs, AIIMS, Maharaja Agrasen Medical College, Agroha, UCMS, Jawaharlal Institute of Postgraduate Medical Education and Research. Students at UCMS, and the other three Delhi medical schools, who were concerned about the reservation system and considered it a political gimmick, started a protest forum called Youth For Equality.

== Form ==
The college offers medical & paramedical courses, and caters to the health care needs for the East Delhi community and surrounding border areas. The institute is a network centre for the National Brain Research Centre and serves as the nodal centre for AIDS and Safdarjung Hospitals. It is one of the three public trauma centres in Delhi, in addition to Susruta Trauma Centre and Jai Prakash Narayana Trauma Centre at AIIMS, and is fully equipped with a burns ward.

UCMS was the first Indian medical college to start a Medical Humanities Group, and it organised the first 'Theatre of the Oppressed' workshop for medical students in India in 2011.

== Rankings ==
University and college rankings

Medical – India
- NIRF (2024): 32
- India Today (2024): 10

UCMS was ranked 10th among medical colleges in India in 2024 by India Today. The National Institutional Ranking Framework (NIRF) ranked it 32nd among medical colleges in 2024.

== Campus ==
College's Campus

UCMS has a huge campus, which includes the Guru Teg Bahadur Hospital (GTB). GTB hospital acts as training hospital and has 1000 beds. It provides facilities like a central workshop, animal house, hospital laboratory services unit, hostel, medical illustration and photography, medical education unit, skill lab and canteen. The college also has technological facilities which include audio-video, telemedicine, electronic assessment.

=== Library ===
The UCMS houses a central library and 17 departmental libraries with a large volume of teaching and learning resources, which support teaching, research and extension programs of the college. There are over 16,000 books and WHO publications, 18,000 volumes of journals, and 400 theses.

=== Hostel ===
There are two hostels, one each for boys and girls. There are also some other residential buildings on the campus for staff and other members.

== Departments ==
There are twenty-one departments at the college: Anaesthesiology, Anatomy, Biochemistry, Biostatistics and Medical Informatics, Community Medicine, Dentistry, Dermatology, Forensic Medicine, Medicine, Microbiology and Gynaecology, Ophthalmology, Orthopaedics, Otorhinolaryngology, Paediatrics, Pathology, Pharmacology, Physiology, Psychiatry, Radiology, Surgery.

== Notable people ==
=== Alumni ===
- Anil Aggrawal, professor and Head of Forensic medicine and Toxicology at MAMC.
- Sanjay Asthana, chief of the division of Geriatrics and Gerontology at the University of Wisconsin School of Medicine and Public Health, and holds the Duncan G. and Lottie H. Ballantine Endowed Chair in Geriatrics.
- Sujoy K. Guha, an Indian biomedical scientist, Inventor of RISUG, the first reversible male contraceptive. Batch of 1979
- Rahul Gupta, director for the Office of National Drug Control Policy of the United States. Nominated by President Joe Biden.
- Raman Kapur, acupuncturist and awarded the Padma Shri.
- Palash Sen, an Indian singer and founder of India's Rock band Euphoria.
- Mahesh Sharma, an Indian politician from Bharatiya Janata Party who is currently Minister of State for Ministry of Environment, Forest and Climate Change as well as Culture
- Ashish Suri, an Indian neurosurgeon, medical academic, and a professor at the Department of Neurosurgery of the All India Institute of Medical Sciences, Delhi . He was one of the group of surgeons who performed the first 3D brain surgery and the first surgery to implant a spinal cord stimulator in India. Awarded the Padma Shri.
- Rajiv Bahl, director of the Indian Council of Medical Research
- Satish Kumar Verma, Former Director Professor and Head at UCMS is a prominent Forensic medicine expert in India. He started the medicolegal autopsy services both at Safdarjung Hospital & UCMS and GTBH, where at both these institutions conducted first ever medicolegal postmortems. He was key personnel involved in solving the Monkey Man Mystery in the year 2001 that happened in Delhi NCR. Youngest recipient of Fellowship of IAFM and first from State of Delhi. presently working as Professor of Forensic Medicine at Amrita School of Medicine, Faridabad, Haryana.

=== Faculty ===
- Autar Singh Paintal, a renowned cardiopulmonary scientist known for his discoveries of several sensory receptors. He was the first Principal of University College of Medical Sciences and second Director of Vallabhbhai Patel Chest Institute and sixth Director General of the Indian Council of Medical Research . Awarded the Padma Vibhushan.
- Dr Satendra Singh is a champion of disability rights and a recipient of the President's National Award and Henry Viscardi Achievement Awards given to global leaders.
