= The Spine Journal =

- Discipline: Orthopedics
- Language: English
- Edited by: Christopher M. Bono

Publication details
- History: 2001-present
- Publisher: Elsevier
- Frequency: Monthly
- Impact factor: 5.1 (2025)

Standard abbreviations
- ISO 4: Spine J.

Indexing
- ISSN: 1529-9430

Links
- Journal homepage; Online access

The Spine Journal is a peer-reviewed medical journal covering research related to the spine. It is the official journal of the North American Spine Society. The journal was established in 2001 and is published by Elsevier.

According to the Journal Citation Reports, The Spine Journal has a 2025 impact factor of 5.1.
