= Dilshad Garden =

- Neighborhood of Delhi
- Motto: Satyameva Jayate
- Anthem: Jana Gana Mana
- Location in Delhi, India
- Coordinates: 28.687°N 77.314°E
- Country: India
- State: Delhi
- District: Shahdara

Government
  - Type: Municipal Corporation
- Elevation: 216 m (709 ft)

Population
  - Total: 57,715
- Demonym(s): Dilliwale, Delhite

Languages
  - Official: Hindi, English
- Time zone: UTC+5:30 (IST)
- PIN: 110095
- Area code: +91-11
- Vehicle registration: DL-1x-x-xxxx to DL-14x-x-xxxx
- Civic agency: MCD

Dilshad Garden is a residential area of Shahdara district, which was planned and developed by Delhi Development Authority in the late 1970s and early 1980s. It falls under the both Shahdara and Seemapuri constituency of the legislative assembly. Thus, a part of Dilshad Garden falls under Delhi Legislative Assembly seats of Seemapuri Vidhan Sabha represented by Shri Veer Singh Dhingan and Shahdara Vidhan Sabha represented by Shri Sanjay Goyal.

Housing within Dilshad Garden is divided into several blocks starting from A to R and several pockets A to SG. Every block has its own market and parks. Most of the residential development is in the form of New Delhi Development Authority (DDA) flats.

The deer park is a public park. There is a weekly market at Dilshad Garden on Tuesdays.

== Education ==
Schools include Hansaraj Smarak School, Greenway Modern School and Red Cross Society School and colleges such as University College of Medical Sciences and the Florence Nightingale College of Nursing. Medical facilities include Guru Teg Bahadur Hospital, Swami Dayanand Hospital and Jivan Jyoti Hospital right next door.

== Religious centres ==
- Ayyappa Temple - Opposite of Pocket R.
- Digamber Jain Mandir, R Block
- Durga Mandir - Pocket R Block nearest temple walking distance from Jhilmil metro station
- Gauri Shankar Mandir - the nearest temple within walking distance from Dilshad Garden metro station
- RadheyKrishna Mandir - near Dilshad Garden
- Shani Mandir and Durga Mandir - Pocket P near Mukherjee School
- Shiv Mandir - Pocket O near O & P
- Badrinath Mandir, DDA Market Chetak complex.
- St Francis of Assisi Forane Syro-Malabar Catholic Church near GTB Hospital red light.

== Transport ==
Dilshad Garden is nearly 4 km from Anand Vihar Interstate Bus Terminus and Railway Station and about 3 km from Shahdara.

The closest metro stations are Dilshad Garden and Jhilmil on Delhi Metro's Red Line - well connected to all major lines: Pink, Green & Yellow line.

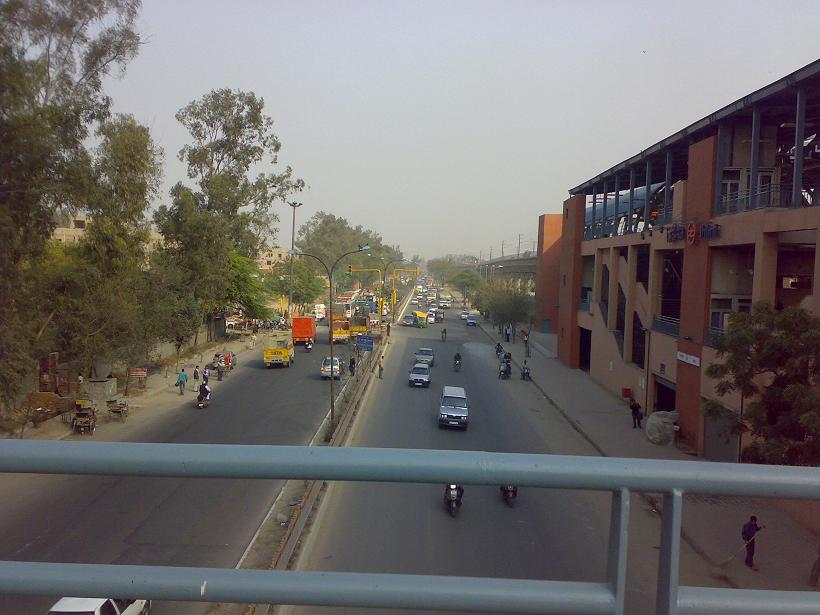
Pedestrian Overpass from Jhilmil Metro Station to Dilshad Garden, as it crosses the Grand Trunk Road, February 2009.
