= Shahdara district =

District of Delhi, India

Shahdara district Shahdara
- District of Delhi
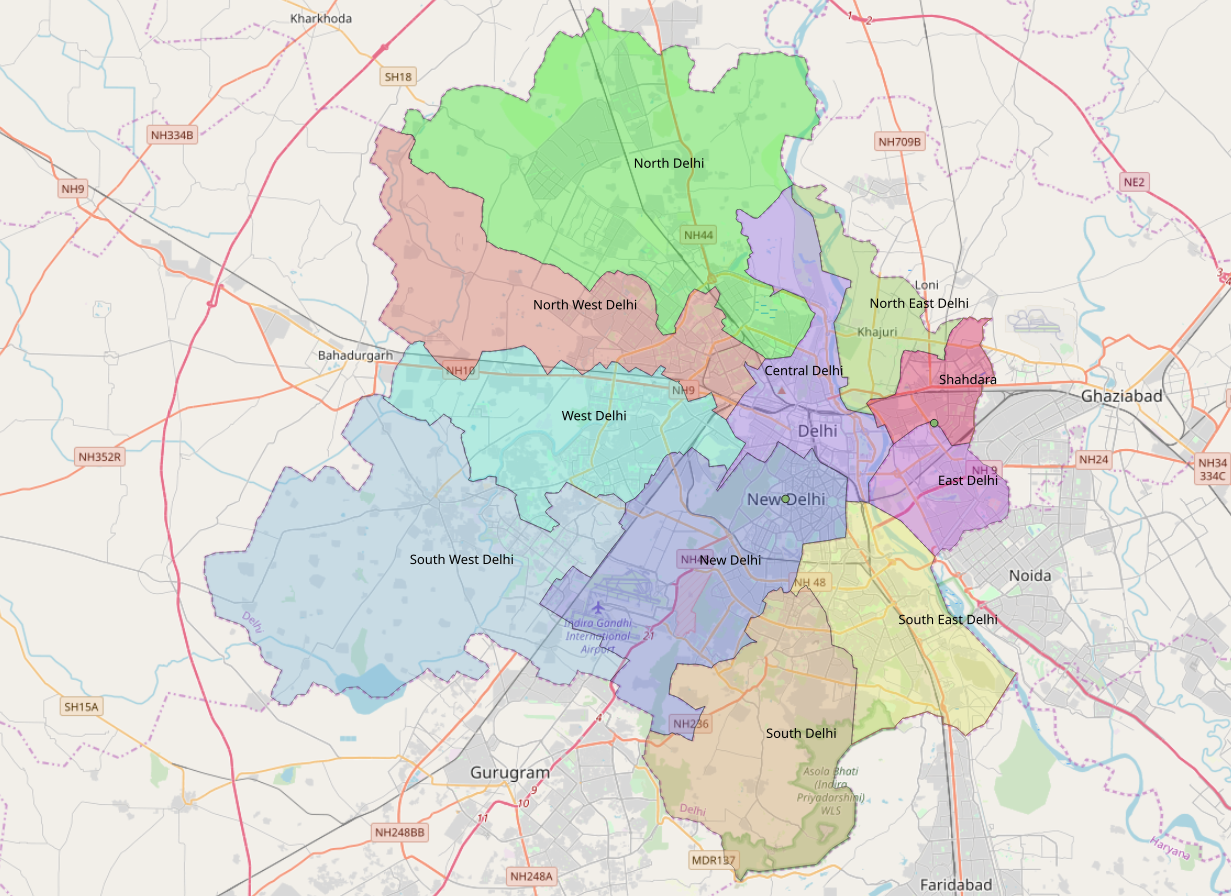
- Location in Delhi, India
- Country: India
- Union Territory: Delhi
- Headquarters: Nand Nagri

Government
  - Type: Republic
  - Body: Government of NCT of Delhi
  - District collector: Patil Pranjal Lahensingh, IAS

Languages
  - Official: Hindi, English
- Time zone: UTC+5:30 (IST)
- PIN: 1100xx
- Telephone code: 011-2232, 011-2238, 011-2230
- Vehicle registration: DL-13, DL-5
- Nearest city: Ghaziabad
- Lok Sabha constituency: North East Delhi and East Delhi
- Civic agency: East municipal Corporation of Delhi (North and East)
- Website: https://dmshahdara.delhi.gov.in/

Shahdara district is an administrative and revenue district of Delhi, India, situated near the banks of Yamuna river.

The district headquarters is Nand Nagri. The Shadara District also has residential area. It is close to Chandni Chowk in Central Delhi as well as to Ghaziabad, Uttar Pradesh. The area near GT road Toll is commonly known as Apsara or Shahdara border. It is one of the oldest inhabited areas of Delhi and integral to what is known as Purani Dilli (Old Delhi). Shahdara district was formed in 2012 and has a collectorate office at Nand Nagri, Delhi.

== Etymology ==
Shahdara means "door of kings" in Urdu. The origin of the name lies in two Persian words: shah meaning "kings" and dara, a door or entrance. Shahdara might have originated from 'shahi dara or dariya', since it is near the river (dariya) Yamuna.

== History ==
The Shahdara district was formed in September 2012.

In the 18th century CE, Shahdara had grain warehouses and wholesale grain markets which supplied the Paharganj grain market, across the Yamuna river.

== Demographics ==
=== Population ===
According to the 2011 Census, Shahdara district had a total population of 322,931, comprising 169,409 males and 153,522 females. The population was entirely urban, with the district recording a density of 59,703 persons per square kilometer.

=== Languages ===
The linguistic composition of Shahdara district, as per the 2011 Census, was predominantly Hindi-speaking, with 253,586 residents (78.5%) reporting it as their mother tongue. Punjabi was spoken by 10,758 people (3.3%), while Urdu was the mother tongue of 57,125 individuals (17.7%). The remaining population (0.5%) spoke a variety of other languages.

=== Religion ===
The religious composition of Shahdara district, as per the 2011 Census, was predominantly Hindu, with 205,984 residents (63.8%) identifying with the faith. Muslims constituted the second-largest group, numbering 99,057 (30.7%). Other religious communities included Jains at 8,635 (2.7%), Sikhs at 7,965 (2.5%), Christians at 635 (0.2%), and Buddhists at 498 (0.1%).

== Administration ==
Shahdara consists of 3 Subdivision- Shahdara, Vivek Vihar and Seemapuri.
