= North American Spine Society =

- Formation: 1985
- Type: Professional association
- Headquarters: Burr Ridge, Illinois
- Location: United States
- Members: 8,961 as of 2013
- President: Heidi Prather, D.O.
- Key people: Executive Director Eric Muehlbauer
- Website: https://www.spine.org

The North American Spine Society (NASS) is a medical society for health care professionals who specialize in spine care. It was founded in 1985 and is the largest such society in America. The organization's goal is the promotion of evidence-based and ethical spine care. NASS does this by policies and actions aimed at promoting education, research and advocacy in health care fields related to the spine. NASS' membership consists of roughly 8,000 health care professionals; such as orthopedic surgeons, neurosurgeons, physiatrists, anesthesiologists, researchers and other related practitioners.

== Publications ==
NASS publishes two major publications, The Spine Journal and SpineLine. The Spine Journal is the official peer-reviewed journal of the North American Spine Society. It was launched in 2001. SpineLine is a bimonthly clinical and news publication for spine care professionals, with information relevant to people working in the field. It is published in both print and digital editions.
