= Henry Seidu Daanaa =

Minister for Chieftaincy and Traditional Affairs
- In office February 2013 – January 2017
- President: John Dramani Mahama
- Preceded by: Alexander Asum-Ahensah (MP)
- Succeeded by: Kofi Dzamesi

Personal details
- Party: National Democratic Congress
- Education: Ghana School of Law
- Occupation: Lawyer

Henry Siedu Daanaa (born 1955) is a lawyer and the former Minister for Chieftaincy and Traditional Affairs of Ghana. He was the first visually impaired person to be approved as a Minister of State in Ghana. He was nominated for the position by President John Dramani Mahama in January 2013.

== Early life ==
Henry Siedu Daanaa was born in 1955 in Tuasa in the Upper West Region of Ghana. He is one of 13 children born to his parents.

Daanaa enrolled into the Law Faculty of the University of Ghana in 1979 and completed his undergraduate coursework in 1981. He then went to the London School of Economics and Political Science to get his master's degree in law. From 1986 to 1992, he completed his Doctorate and Degree programmes in Law from the same university.

== Career ==
The Board of Legal Education approved Daanaa's admission to the Ghana School of Law for a two-year professional law course. His education was through the use of Braille equipment which he provided. He successfully completed the course and was called to the Ghana Bar, becoming the first blind lawyer in the country. He worked in with the Regional House of Chiefs in almost all the ten Regions of Ghana and rose to become the National Director of Research at the Ministry of Culture and Chieftaincy. Daanaa was a board member of trustees of the Ghana Society for the Blind from 1995 to 1999. He worked with the Ministry for more than 19 years and served in various capacities, including being the chief research fellow for the ministry.

Daanaa was approved as a minister by the Parliament of Ghana along with ten others on 13 February 2013. Upon his confirmation as the sector minister, Yaw Ofori Debrah, president of the Ghana Federation of the Disabled hailed his appointment as a recognition of the talents of physically impaired persons. He was succeeded as minister by Kofi Dzamesi.

== Awards ==
In 1995, during the calling of new lawyers to the Ghana Bar, the then Chief Justice of Ghana and chairman of the General Legal Council, Justice Isaac Kobina Abban awarded Daanaa with a braille citation in recognition of his excellent and distinctive academic performances during his tutelage.

== See also ==
- List of Mahama government ministers

Political offices
Preceded by Alexander Asum-Ahensah	Minister for Chieftaincy and Traditional Affairs; 2013 – present	Incumbent
