= Convention on the Rights of Persons with Disabilities =

Treaty of the United Nations

- states parties states that have signed, but not ratified states that have not signed
- Drafted: 13 December 2006
- Signed: 30 March 2007
- Location: New York
- Effective: 3 May 2008
- Condition: 20 ratifications
- Signatories: 164
- Parties: 194
- Depositary: Secretary-General of the United Nations
- Languages: Arabic, Chinese, English, French, Russian, and Spanish

The Convention on the Rights of Persons with Disabilities (CRPD) is an international human rights treaty of the United Nations intended to protect the rights and dignity of persons with disabilities. Parties to the convention are required to promote, protect, and ensure the full enjoyment of human rights by persons with disabilities and ensure that persons with disabilities enjoy full equality under the law. The Convention serves as a major catalyst in the global disability rights movement enabling a shift from viewing persons with disabilities as objects of charity, medical treatment and social protection towards viewing them as full and equal members of society, with human rights. The convention was the first U.N. human rights treaty of the twenty-first century.

The text was adopted by the United Nations General Assembly on 13 December 2006, and opened for signature on 30 March 2007. Following ratification by the 20th party, it came into force on 3 May 2008. As of November 2026, it has 164 signatories and 194 parties, 193 states and the European Union (which ratified it on 23 December 2010). The convention is monitored by the Committee on the Rights of Persons with Disabilities for which annual Conferences of States Parties to the CRPD have set guidelines since 2008. The thirteenth Conference of States Parties was scheduled to meet in New York in June 2020, then rescheduled tentatively to meet in December 2020 due to the COVID-19 crisis.

== History ==
The Convention on the Rights of Persons with Disabilities, like the other United Nations human rights conventions, (such as the International Covenant on Civil and Political Rights and the Convention on the Elimination of All Forms of Discrimination against Women) resulted from decades of activity during which group rights standards developed from aspirations to binding treaties.

The United Nations General Assembly adopted the 1971 Declaration on the Rights of Mentally Retarded Persons followed by the Declaration on the Rights of Disabled Persons on 9 December 1975. 1981 was the International Year of Disabled Persons; an outcome of year was the World Programme of Action Concerning Disabled Persons. The Year was followed by the Decade of Disabled Persons, 1983–1992. In 1987, a global meeting of experts to review progress recommended that the UN General Assembly should draft an international convention on the elimination of discrimination against persons with disabilities. Draft convention outlines were proposed by Italy and subsequently Sweden, but no consensus was reached. Many government representatives argued that existing human rights documents were sufficient. An International Day of Persons with Disabilities (3 December) was proclaimed in 1992 General Assembly resolution 47/3. The United Nations General Assembly adopted the non-compulsory Standard Rules on the Equalization of Opportunities for Persons with Disabilities on 20 December 1993 (resolution 48/96 annex). Many analysts characterized the pre-CRPD documents as "soft", in contrast with the "hard" treaty obligations of the CRPD.

In March, 2000, leaders of six international disability NGOs, along with about 20 regional and national disability organizations, adopted the "Beijing Declaration on the Rights of Persons with Disabilities in the New Millennium", calling on all governments to support a Convention. In 2001, the General Assembly, following a proposal by Mexico, established an Ad Hoc Committee on a Comprehensive and Integral International Convention on the Protection and Promotion of the Rights and Dignity of Persons with Disabilities to consider proposals for a comprehensive and integral convention to promote and protect the rights and dignity of persons with disabilities, based on a holistic approach. Disability rights organisations, including Disabled Peoples' International, the World Network of Users and Survivors of Psychiatry, Landmine Survivors Network (now Survivor Corps), and the International Disability Alliance influenced the drafting process. The International Disability Alliance served as coordinator of an ad hoc International Disability Caucus, participated actively in the drafting process, in particular seeking a role for disabled persons and their organisations in the implementation and monitoring of what became the convention.

In 2001, at the 56th session of the United Nations General Assembly, Mexico initiated negotiations, with active support from GRULAC (the Latin American regional group). When support for a Convention was foundering in 2002 due to WEOG opposition, New Zealand played a pivotal role in achieving cross-regional momentum. Acting as facilitator from 2002 to 2003, New Zealand eventually assumed the formal role of Chair of the Ad Hoc Committee and led negotiations to a consensus agreement in August 2006, working closely with other Committee members Jordan, Costa Rica, the Czech Republic, and South Africa, as well as Korea and Mexico. Several observers commented on the "esteem-seeking behavior" of governments, national human rights institutions, and nongovernmental organizations.

The Convention became one of the most quickly supported human rights instruments in history, with strong support from all regional groups. 160 States signed the Convention upon its opening in 2007 and 126 States ratified the Convention within its first five years. In recognition of its role in creating the convention, as well as the quality of New Zealand's landmark National Disability Strategy, Governor-General of New Zealand Anand Satyanand received the 2008 World Disability Award on behalf of the nation.

In 2015, for the first time in its short history, the Committee on the Rights of Persons with Disabilities opened an investigation into a signatory state for breaching their convention obligations. The investigation was triggered by article 6 of the optional protocol, which provides that an investigation will be carried out once the committee receives "reliable information indicating grave and systematic violation" of the human rights of persons with disabilities. The government of the United Kingdom was investigated, with the final report released in 2016.

The United States has been conspicuously absent from the States Parties that have ratified or acceded to the convention. During Barack Obama's administration the U.S. became a signatory to the convention on 24 July 2009. On July 31, 2012, the U.S. Senate Foreign Relations Committee recommended U.S. ratification, "subject to three reservations, eight understandings and two declarations". In December 2012, a vote in the United States Senate fell six votes short of the two-thirds majority required for advice and consent on ratification. In July 2014, the Senate Foreign Relations Committee again approved a resolution for advice and consent, but the measure was not brought to a vote of the full Senate.

== Overview ==
The Convention follows the civil law tradition, with a preamble, in which the principle that "all human rights are universal, indivisible, interdependent and interrelated "of the Vienna Declaration and Programme of Action is cited. The 25-subsection preamble explicitly mentions sustainable development, notes that "disability" is an "evolving concept" involving interaction between impairments and environmental factors, and mentions the importance of a "gender perspective". The preamble is followed by 50 articles. Unlike many UN covenants and conventions, it is not formally divided into parts.

Article 1 defines the purpose of the convention:

to promote, protect and ensure the full and equal enjoyment of all human rights and fundamental freedoms by all persons with disabilities, and to promote respect for their inherent dignity

Article 2 provides definitions of some keywords in CRPD provisions: communication, (including Braille, sign language, plain language and nonverbal communication), discrimination on the basis of disability, reasonable accommodation and universal design.

Article 3 delineates the CRPD's eight "general principles" described below, while Article 4 delineates parties' "general obligations."

Articles 5–32 define the rights of persons with disabilities and the obligations of states parties towards them. Many of these mirror rights affirmed in other UN conventions such as the International Covenant on Civil and Political Rights, International Covenant on Economic, Social and Cultural Rights and the Convention Against Torture, but with specific obligations ensuring that they can be fully realized by persons with disabilities.

Rights specific to this convention include the rights to accessibility including the information technology, the rights to live independently and be included in the community (Article 19), to personal mobility (article 20), habilitation and rehabilitation (Article 26), and to participation in political and public life, and cultural life, recreation and sport (Articles 29 and 30).

In addition, parties to the Convention must raise awareness of the human rights of persons with disabilities (Article 8), and ensure access to roads, buildings, and information (Article 9).

Articles 33–39 govern reporting and monitoring of the convention by national human rights institutions (Article 33) and the Committee on the Rights of Persons with Disabilities (Articles 34 through 39).

Articles 40–50 govern ratification, entry into force, relation to "regional integration organizations", reservations, amendment, and denunciation of the convention. Article 49 requires that the Convention be available in accessible formats, and Article 50 provides that the convention's "Arabic, Chinese, English, French, Russian and Spanish texts" are "equally authentic".

== Core provisions ==
Despite the United Nations authorizing an "official fiction" of no "new rights", CRPD provisions address a broad variety of human rights, while adding a state obligation that states provide support to guarantee rights can be practiced. Various authors group them in different categories; this entry will describe basics and mechanics, then describe three categories roughly equivalent to the disputed concept of three generations of human rights.

With increasing frequency, observers have commented on the overlapping and interdependence of categories of rights. In 1993, the World Conference on Human Rights' Vienna Declaration provided in its Article 5 that since human rights were "universal, indivisible and interdependent and interrelated ... States have a duty to promote and protect all human rights and fundamental freedoms." Gerard Quinn specifically commented on the fact that the CRPD "co-mingles civil and political rights with economic, social and cultural rights". This is especially apparent in the CRPD where political rights have been meaningless without social and economic support for the economic and social rights are meaningless without participation.

=== Basics and mechanics ===
Some of the CRPD's first articles set forth its purpose and foundations; after listing disability rights (summarized in later sections below), its last Articles spell out the institutional framework by which disability rights are to be promoted.

==== Guiding principles of the Convention ====
There are eight guiding principles that underlie the convention, delineated in Article 3:

1. Respect for inherent dignity, individual autonomy including the freedom to make one's own choices, and independence of persons
2. Non-discrimination
3. Full and effective participation and inclusion in society
4. Respect for difference and acceptance of persons with disabilities as part of human diversity and humanity
5. Equality of opportunity
6. Accessibility
7. Equality between men and women
8. Respect for the evolving capacities of children with disabilities and respect for the right of children with disabilities to preserve their identities

=== Definitions ===
Article 2 (Definitions) does not include a definition of disability. The Convention adopts a social model of disability, but does not offer a specific definition.

==== Disability ====
The convention's preamble (section e) explains that the Convention recognises:

that disability is an evolving concept and that disability results from the interaction between persons with impairments and attitudinal and environmental barriers that hinders their full and effective participation in society on an equal basis with others

Article one (Purpose) further offers that:

Persons with disabilities include those who have long-term physical, mental, intellectual or sensory impairments which in interaction with various barriers may hinder their full and effective participation in society on an equal basis with others.

===== Principle of "reasonable accommodation" =====
The Convention defines "reasonable accommodation" as "necessary and appropriate modification and adjustments not imposing a disproportionate or undue burden, where needed in a particular case, to ensure to persons with disabilities the enjoyment or exercise on an equal basis with others of all human rights and fundamental freedoms" in Article 2 and demands this in all aspects of life including inclusive education.

==== Awareness-raising ====
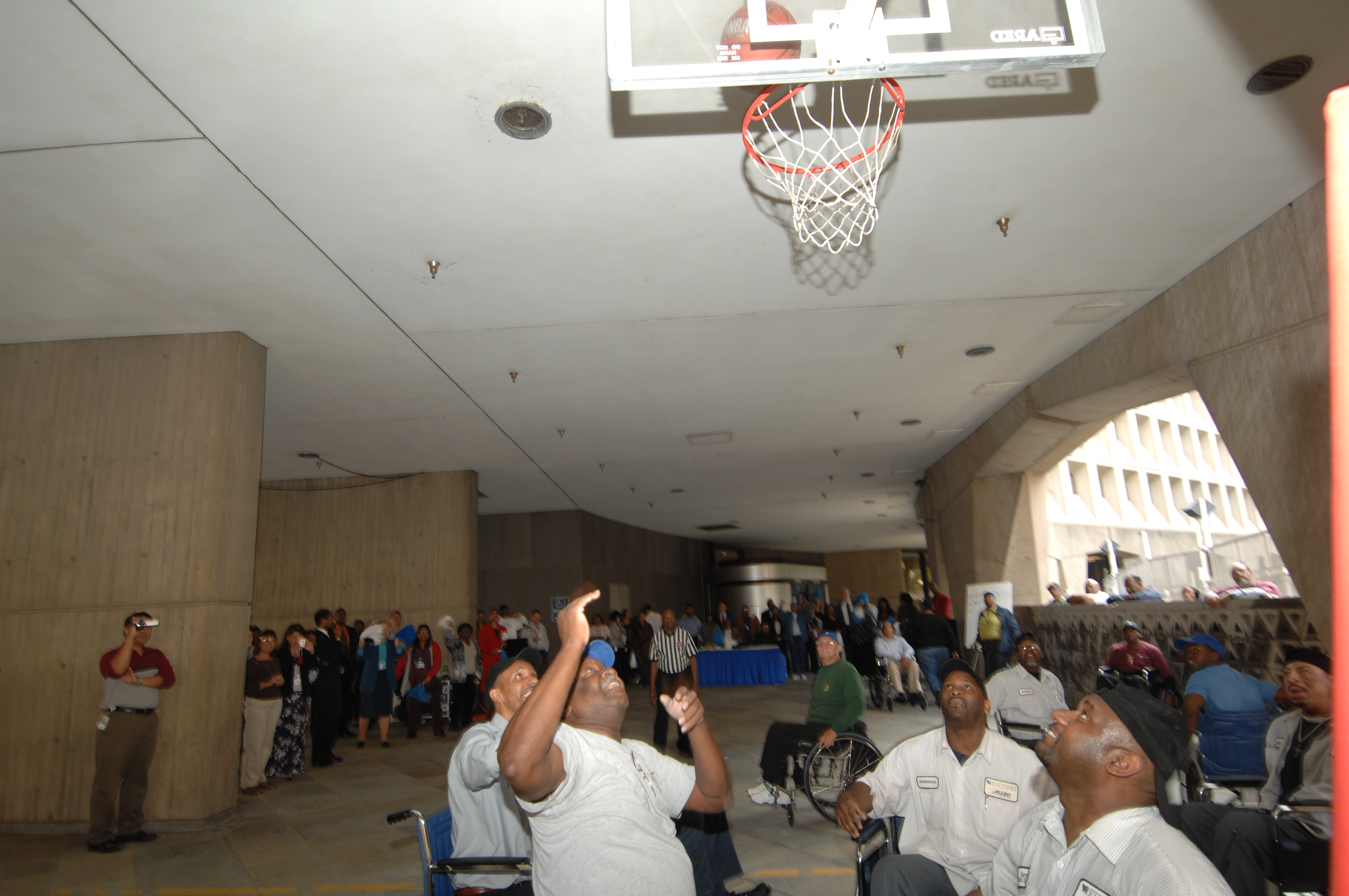
HUD-sponsored wheelchair basketball game to promote disability awareness, outside HUD Headquarters – DPLA

Article 8 of the Convention stresses parties' commitment to awareness raising to foster respect for rights and dignity to counter disability discrimination. Parties commit to raise disability awareness throughout society, including at the family level, to combat stereotypes, prejudices and harmful practices relating to persons with disabilities, including those aggravated by sex and age discrimination. They commit to effective public awareness campaigns to foster positive perceptions in the labour market, the media, and elsewhere.

=== Civil and political rights ===
The CRPD includes many "freedoms from", reflecting liberal and humanist ideals enshrined in the United Nations Universal Declaration of Human Rights, the International Covenant on Civil and Political Rights, and in the many states' rights documents such as the Americans with Disabilities Act. In the CRPD, frequently states assume obligations to guarantee rights in practice.

==== Accessibility ====
In its Article 9, the Convention stresses that persons with disabilities should be able to live independently and participate fully in all aspects of life. To this end, States Parties should take appropriate measures to ensure that persons with disabilities have access, to the physical environment, to transportation, to information and communications technology, and to other facilities and services open or provided to the public. Accessibility can be grouped into three main groups:

1. physical accessibility
2. service accessibility
3. accessibility to communication and information

==== Recognition before the law and legal capacity ====
Article 12 of the Convention affirms the equal recognition before the law and legal capacity of persons with disabilities. It provides that Parties (States and the European Union should reaffirm that persons with disabilities have the right to recognition everywhere as a person before the law; recognize that persons with disabilities enjoy legal capacity on an equal basis with others in all aspects of life; take appropriate measures to provide access by persons with disabilities to the support they may require in exercising their legal capacity; and ensure that all measures that relate to the exercise of legal capacity provide for appropriate and effective safeguards to prevent abuse in accordance with international human rights law.

This provision has been particularly important for disability rights organizations challenging state practices of institutionalization and guardianship.

==== Access to justice ====
Article 13 of the Convention affirms the effective access to justice for persons with disabilities, stating that: States parties shall ensure effective access to justice for persons with disabilities on an equal basis with others, including through the provision of procedural and age-appropriate accommodations, in order to facilitate their effective role as participants, including as witnesses, in all legal proceedings, including at investigative and other preliminary stages.

In order to help to ensure effective access to justice for persons with disabilities, states Parties are to promote appropriate training for those working in the administration of justice, including police and prison staff. This Article together with Article 12 are cited by the "Handbook on prisoners with special needs" by the United Nations Office on Drugs and Crime.

==== Participation in public life (including the right to vote) ====
Article 29 requires that all Contracting States protect "the right of persons with disabilities to vote by secret ballot in elections and public referendums". According to this provision, each Contracting State should provide for voting equipment which would enable disabled voters to vote independently and secretly. Some democracies, e.g., the US, Japan, Netherlands, Slovenia, Albania or India allow disabled voters to use electronic voting machines or electronic aides which help disabled voters to fill the paper ballot. In others, among them Azerbaijan, Kosovo, Canada, Ghana, United Kingdom, and most African and Asian countries, visually impaired voters can use ballots in braille or paper ballot templates. Many of these and also some other democracies, Chile for example, use adjustable desks so that voters on wheelchairs can approach them. Some democracies only allow another person to cast a ballot for the blind or disabled voter. Such arrangement, however, does not assure secrecy of the ballot.

Article 29 also requires that Contracting States ensure "that voting procedures, facilities and materials are appropriate, accessible and easy to understand and use". In some democracies, i.e. Sweden and the US, all the polling places already are fully accessible for disabled voters.

=== Economic, social, and cultural rights ===
The CRPD has many "freedoms to", guarantees that states will provide housing, food, employment, health care, and personal assistance, set forth in the United Nations International Covenant on Economic, Social, and Cultural Rights. These are positive obligations that the state will act, going beyond the promises of the Americans with Disabilities Act.

==== Respect for the family ====
Article 23 of the Convention prohibits compulsory sterilization of disabled persons and guarantees their right to adopt children.

==== Right to education ====
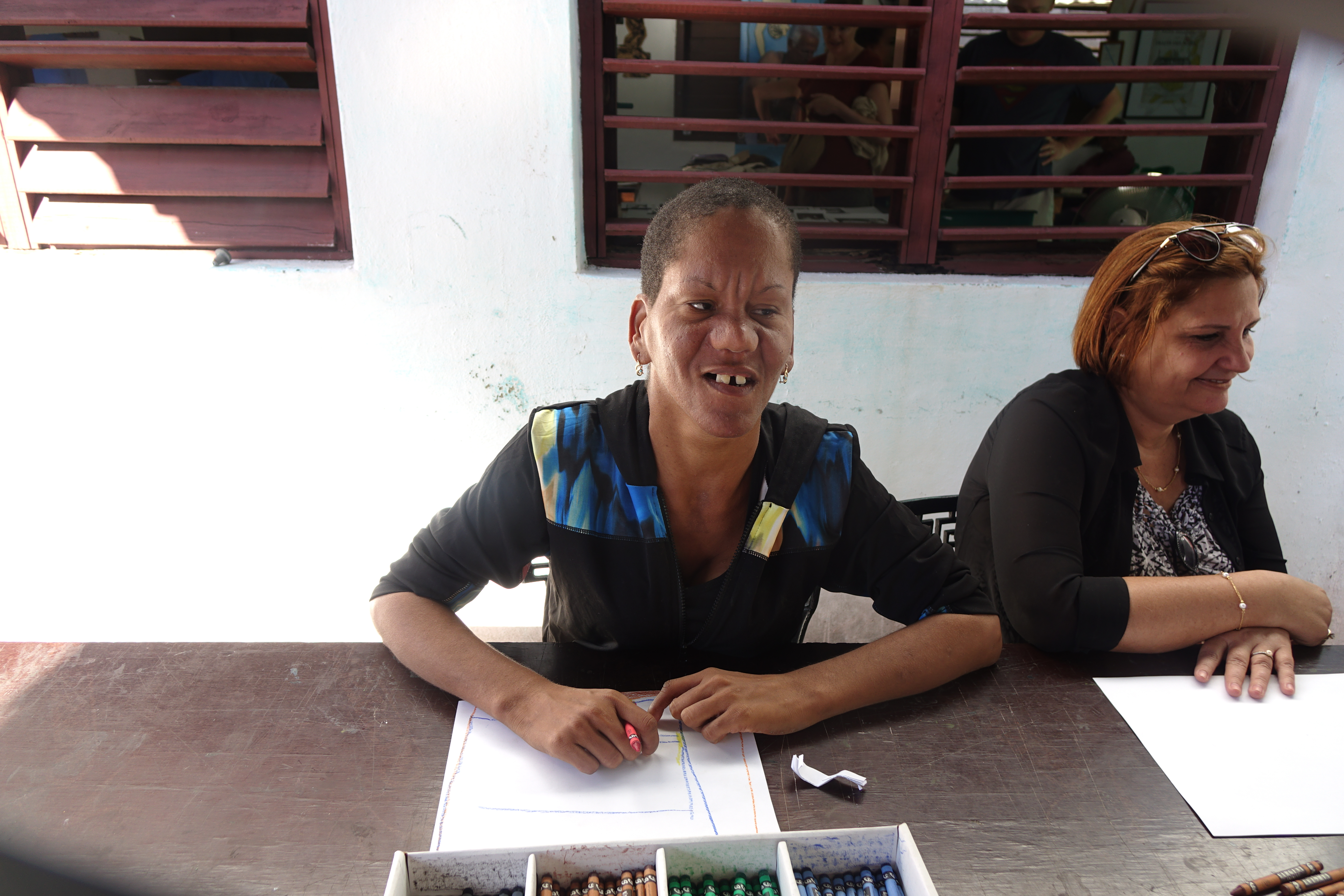
Cienfuegos, a non-profit group teaching art to people with disabilities in Cuba

The convention's Article 24 states that persons with disabilities should be guaranteed the right to inclusive education at all levels, regardless of age, without discrimination and on the basis of equal opportunity. It specifies that children with disabilities must have effective access to free and compulsory primary and secondary education; adults with disabilities have access to general tertiary education, vocational training, adult education and lifelong learning; and more.

Parties are to take appropriate measures, such as: endorsing the learning of Braille, alternative script, augmentative and alternative modes, means and formats of communication and orientation and mobility skills, and facilitating peer support and mentoring; supporting the learning of sign language and promoting the linguistic identity of the deaf community; advocating that education of persons, particularly children, who are blind and/or deaf, is delivered in the most appropriate languages and means of communication for the individual; and employing teachers, including teachers with disabilities, who are qualified in sign language and/or Braille, and to train education professionals and staff about disability awareness, use of augmentative and alternative modes and formats of communication, and educational techniques and materials to support persons with disabilities.

The Committee on the Rights of Persons with Disabilities' General Comment Number 4, adopted in August 2016, stressed the importance of inclusive education and condemned segregated education. The Comment was opposed by organizations including the World Blind Union and the World Federation of the Deaf which unsuccessfully argued for a "sensory exception" to recognize the importance of cultural and linguistic rights.

==== Right to health ====
Article 25 specifies that "persons with disabilities have the right to the enjoyment of the highest attainable standard of health without discrimination on the basis of disability".

==== Habilitation and rehabilitation ====
Article 26 of the Convention affirms that "States Parties shall take effective and appropriate measures, including through peer support, to enable persons with disabilities to attain and maintain maximum independence, full physical, mental, social and vocational ability, and full inclusion and participation in all aspects of life. To that end, States Parties shall organize, strengthen and extend comprehensive habilitation and rehabilitation services and programmes, particularly in the areas of health, employment, education and social services, in such a way that these services and programmes: begin at the earliest possible stage, are based on the multidisciplinary assessment of individual needs and strengths; and support participation and inclusion in the community and all aspects of society, are voluntary, and are available to persons with disabilities as close as possible to their own communities, including in rural areas."

Parties pledge to promote the development of initial and continuing training for professionals and staff working in habilitation and rehabilitation service as well as the availability, knowledge and use of assistive devices and technologies, designed for persons with disabilities, as they relate to habilitation and rehabilitation.

==== Work and employment ====
Article 27 requires that States Parties recognize the right of persons with disabilities to work, on an equal basis of others; this includes the right to the opportunity to gain a living by work freely chosen or accepted in a labour market and work environment that is open, inclusive and accessible to persons with disabilities. The Article obligates States Parties to safeguard and promote the realization of the right to work, including for those who acquire a disability during the course of employment, by taking appropriate steps, including through legislation, to prohibit discrimination on the basis of disability with regard to all matters concerning all forms of employment, continuance of employment, career advancement and safe and healthy working conditions; and to protect the rights of persons with disabilities, on an equal basis with others, to just and favourable conditions of work, including equal opportunities and equal remuneration for work of equal value, safe and healthy working conditions, including protection from harassment, and the redress of grievances;

Parties agree to ensure that persons with disabilities are able to exercise their labour and trade union rights on an equal basis with others; to enable persons with disabilities to have effective access to general technical and vocational guidance programmes, placement services and vocational and continuing training; to promote employment opportunities and career advancement for persons with disabilities in the labour market, as well as assistance in finding, obtaining, maintaining and returning to employment; and to promote opportunities for self-employment, entrepreneurship, the development of cooperative and starting one's own business, acquisition of work experience, vocational and professional rehabilitation, job retention and return-to-work programmes for persons with disabilities.

Parties pledge to ensure that reasonable accommodation is provided to persons with disabilities in the workplace and that persons with disabilities are not held in slavery or in servitude, and are protected, on an equal basis with others, from forced or compulsory labour.

==== Adequate standard of living and social protection ====
Article 28 requires that States Parties recognize the right of persons with disabilities to an adequate standard of living for themselves and their families, including adequate food, clothing and housing, and to the continuous improvement of living conditions, and shall take appropriate steps to safeguard and promote the realization of this rights without discrimination on the basis of disability.

States Parties recognize the right of persons with disabilities to social protection and to the enjoyment of that rights without discrimination on the basis of disability, and shall take appropriate steps to safeguard and promote the realization of the rights, including measures; to social protection programmes and poverty reduction programmes (in particular, regarding women and girls with disabilities and older persons with disabilities);

Specifically, parties are to ensure persons with disabilities equal access to clean water service, and to ensure access to appropriate and affordable services, devices and other assistance for disability-related needs; access by persons with disabilities and their families living in situations of poverty to assistance from the State with disability-related expenses, including adequate training, counselling, financial assistance and respite care; access to public housing programmes, to retirement benefits and more.

=== Independent living, international cooperation and national implementation, integrity, disaster protection ===
Some CRPD sections exemplify "third generation" human rights, sometimes described as new rights, "freedoms with", solidarity rights, or group rights. They reflect a realization that disability rights will require a mix of participation by disabled persons, international cooperation, and national implementation.

==== Situations of risk and humanitarian emergency ====
Article 11 of the Convention affirms that States Parties shall take, in accordance with their obligations under international law, including international humanitarian law and international human rights law, all necessary measures to ensure the protection and safety of persons with disabilities in situations of armed conflict, humanitarian emergencies and the occurrence of natural disaster.

==== Independent living ====
The CRPD's Article 19, "Living independently and being included in the community", is closely related to Article 3 (General Principles) and Article 4 (General Obligations). As sometimes indicated in the Committee on the Rights of Persons with Disabilities' Concluding Observations on the parties' periodic reports or in a General Comment issued by the committee, disability by its nature involves interdependence, but states can encourage or discourage the autonomy of disabled people and disabled peoples' organizations.

==== International cooperation and national implementation ====
The CRPD's Article 32 deals with international cooperation, and Article 33 deals with the complexities of national implementation to be facilitated by international cooperation.

Specifically, Article 32 provides that "States Parties recognize the importance of international cooperation ... and will undertake appropriate and effective ... in partnership with relevant international and regional organizations and civil society, in particular organizations of persons with disabilities." Development programs are to be inclusive of disabled people, an aspiration that has not always been met in practice. Development has recently been an oft-expressed United Nations concern, especially since 4 December 1986, when the United Nations General Assembly adopted the Declaration on the Right to Development.

Development and disability rights both depend on popular participation, international cooperation, and national implementation. As expressed in the CRPD's Article 33, parties are to involve civil society, and have designated "focal points", often in practice national human rights institutions.

=== Reservations ===
A number of parties have made reservations and interpretative understandings or declarations to their application of the convention. These are some examples:

Australia does not consider itself bound to stop forcibly medicating those labeled mentally ill when it is considered a last resort, and understands the convention to allow substitute decision-making.

El Salvador accepts the convention to the extent that it is compatible with its constitution.

France does not consider the convention to be legally binding.

Japan declares that paragraph 4 of Article 23 of the convention is interpreted not to apply to a case where a child is separated from his or her parents as a result of deportation in accordance with its immigration law.

Malta interprets the right to health in Article 25 of the convention as not implying any right to abortion. It also reserves the right to continue to apply its own election laws around accessibility and assistance.

Mauritius does not consider itself bound by the Article 11 obligation to take all necessary measures to protect persons with disabilities during natural disasters, armed conflict or humanitarian emergencies, unless permitted by domestic legislation.

The Netherlands interprets the right to life in Article 10 within the framework of its domestic laws. It also interprets Article 25(f), which bars the discriminatory denial of health care, as permitting a person to refuse medical treatment, including food or fluids.

Poland interprets Articles 23 and 25 as not conferring any right to abortion.

The United Kingdom has reservations relating to the right to education, immigration, service in the armed forces and an aspect of social security law.

Among the other parties attaching reservations, understandings, or declarations to their ratification or accession were the European Union, Azerbaijan, Canada, Cyprus, Egypt, Iran, the Syrian Arab Republic, Venezuela, and many others. As of 16 August 2020, 22 parties had filed formal objections to other parties' reservations, understandings, or declarations.

== Optional protocol ==
states parties states that signed, but have not ratified states that have not signed

The Optional Protocol to the Convention on the Rights of Persons with Disabilities is a side-agreement to the Convention which allows its parties to recognise the competence of the Committee on the Rights of Persons with Disabilities to consider complaints from individuals. The text is based heavily on the Optional Protocol to the Convention on the Elimination of All Forms of Discrimination against Women.

The Optional Protocol entered into force with the convention on 3 May 2008. As of August 2026, it has 95 signatories and 110 parties.

A first stage is a Committee holding on the complaint's admissibility. The CRPD requires "exhaustion of domestic remedies" (Article 2 of the Optional Protocol). The Committee may also rule a communication inadmissible if it is anonymous or not sufficiently substantiated. An applicant may offer substantiation that resort to domestic remedies would be unreasonably prolonged or impossible.

The United Nations Office of the High Commissioner for Human Rights maintains a record of all individual complaints filed under the Optional Protocol. Several of the communications that were ruled admissible resulted in comments by advocates and nongovernmental analysts.

A disabled peoples organization, the International Disability Alliance, summarizes and interprets each case (37 cases as of 30 July 2020). Individuals from Australia, Tanzania, the United Kingdom, Mexico, Lithuania, Germany, Spain, Sweden, Austria, Italy, Brazil, Argentina, Hungary, Greece, and Ecuador brought the first complaints. One communication considered by the committee was X v. Tanzania. It involves an individual with albinism who had an arm cut off. The failure of the state, demonstrated to the committee, was a failure to investigate or prosecute.

Some other CRPD communications concerned community living for a previously institutionalized Australian, a Lithuanian's access to justice after a traffic accident, a deaf Australian's access to justice, an Austrian's access to necessary information to use public transportation, and employment in Italy, Brazil, and elsewhere.

== Committee on the Rights of Persons with Disabilities ==
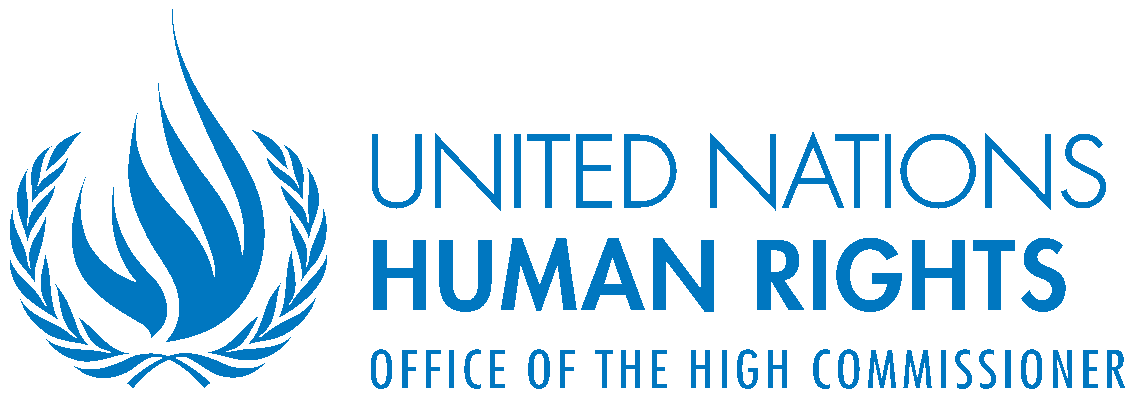
Logo of the United Nations Office of the High Commissioner for Human Rights which is charged with supporting treaty bodies on persons with disabilities, women, racial discrimination, children, and others

The Committee on the Rights of Persons with Disabilities is a body of human rights experts tasked with monitoring the implementation of the convention. It is one of the ten treaty bodies supported by the United Nations' Office of the High Commissioner for Human Rights in Geneva. It initially consisted of 12 independent human rights experts, with half elected for a two-year term and half elected for four-year terms. Thereafter members have been elected for four-year terms, with half the members elected every two years. As the convention has achieved 80 ratifications, the committee was expanded to 18 members in 2011.

As of January 14, 2026, the experts, expected to serve until the end of 2026 or 2028, were:

| Name | State | Term expires (Note: All terms expire on 31 December of the year shown. "Membership: Committee on the Rights of Persons with Disabilities (United Nations Human Rights)". United Nations. 14 September 2012.) |
|---|---|---|
| Muhannad Salah Al-Azzeh | Jordan | 2026 |
| Rehab Mohammed Boresli | Kuwait | 2026 |
| Magino Corporán Lorenzo | Dominican Republic | 2028 |
| Gerel Dondovdorj | Mongolia | 2028 |
| Mara Cristina Gabrilli | Brazil | 2028 |
| Amalia Gamio Ríos - Vice Chair | Mexico | 2026 |
| Natalia Guala Beathyate | Uruguay | 2028 |
| Laverne Jacobs - Rapporteur | Canada | 2026 |
| Rosemary Kayess | Australia | 2026 |
| Miyeon Kim - Chairperson | South Korea | 2026 |
| Alfred Kouadio Kouassi | Ivory Coast | 2026 |
| Abdelmajid Makni - Vice Chair | Morocco | 2028 |
| Floyd Morris | Jamaica | 2028 |
| Christopher Nwanoro - Vice Chair | Nigeria | 2028 |
| Gertrude Oforiwa Fefoame | Ghana | 2026 |
| Inmaculada Placencia Porrero | European Union | 2028 |
| Markus Schefer | Switzerland | 2026 |
| Hiroshi Tamon | Japan | 2028 |

The General Comments issued by the Committee and Concluding Observations on each state report to the Committee reveal areas of agreement and of disagreement among the eighteen experts, for instance in General Comments on inclusive education and on independent living. In its short existence, the committee has issued seven General Comments as of 19 August 2020, and more than a hundred Concluding Observations on state reports.

== Criticism and caveats ==
The Convention and Committee have garnered wide support from states and nongovernmental organizations, but some critics as well. Particularly within the United States, prominent Republican senators and interest groups such as the Home School Legal Defense Association claim that the CRPD erodes sovereignty. Such claims are contested by leading advocates and scholars.

Conversely, several critical disability studies scholars have argued that the CRPD is unlikely to promote the kinds of changes necessary to advance disability rights claims in order to address inequality. Studies also indicate that not all members of the disability movement feel that the CRPD has been a useful tool for advocacy: advocates and grassroots activists in the UK and in Hungary claimed they did not see the CRPD and other human rights laws impactful in everyday advocacy and they do not prefer to use such laws, because they rarely work in practice. The 2016 elections to the Committee on the Rights of Persons with Disabilities resulted in only one female member and 17 males being elected, an imbalance rectified in the 2018 elections. This was despite the CRPD's explicit call in Article 34 for consideration of "balanced gender representation" on the committee.

== United Nations Partnership on the Rights of Persons with Disabilities ==
The United Nations Partnership on the Rights of Persons with Disabilities (UNPRPD) is a partnership, established in 2011, between several UN entities and other organizations. The partnership aims to increase the effectiveness of the work efforts by its partners for disability inclusion in conformance with the CRPD.

The UN entities participating in UNPRPD are ILO, ITU, OHCHR, UNDESA, UNDP, UNESCO, UNFPA, UN Women and WHO. Other UNPRPD members include the International Disability Alliance and the International Disability and Development Consortium.

== See also ==
- Americans with Disabilities Act
- Augmentative and alternative communication
- Disability rights movement
- Disability flag
- International Disability and Development Consortium
- International Disability Alliance
- Inter-American Convention on the Elimination of all Forms of Discrimination Against Persons with Disabilities
- International human rights law
- National human rights institutions
- Nothing About Us Without Us
- Principles for the Protection of Persons with Mental Illness
- Psychiatric survivors movement
- Reasonable accommodation
- Universal design
- World report on disability
