= WeThe15 =

Human rights movement

#WeThe15
- #WeThe15 Logo representing the proportion of persons with disabilities in the global population
- Founded: 2021
- Purpose: disability visibility, rights and inclusion
- Affiliations: International Paralympic Committee; International Disability Alliance; disability sports organizations; activist and innovation organizations; multinational organizations
- Website: www.wethe15.org

#WeThe15 is a global human rights movement which aims to make persons with disabilities, who make up 15% of the world's population (1.2 billion people), visible. An initiative of the International Paralympic Committee and the International Disability Alliance, it is supported, by a number of organisations from the world of disability sports, disability rights, non-governmental and governmental organisations. It was launched as part of the 2020 Summer Paralympics in 2021. Landmarks across the world were lit up in purple to coincide with the opening ceremony. The movement was given particular focus during the closing ceremony.

A TV campaign in August 2021 showcased people with disabilities, not just as "special", or "inspiring", but as normal people—with the same challenges as non-disabled people—who must not be ignored, but included.

== Founding organisations ==
- Disability sports organizations
  - International Paralympic Committee
  - Special Olympics
  - Deaflympics
  - Invictus Games
- Activist and innovation organizations
  - International Disability Alliance
  - International Disability and Development Consortium
  - Zero Project
  - ATscale
  - CTalent
  - The Valuable 500
- Multinational organizations
  - European Commission
  - UNESCO
  - Office of the High Commissioner for Human Rights
  - Global Goals Advisory
  - Sustainable Development Goals Action Campaign
  - Alliance of Civilizations
