= Gertrude Oforiwa Fefoame =

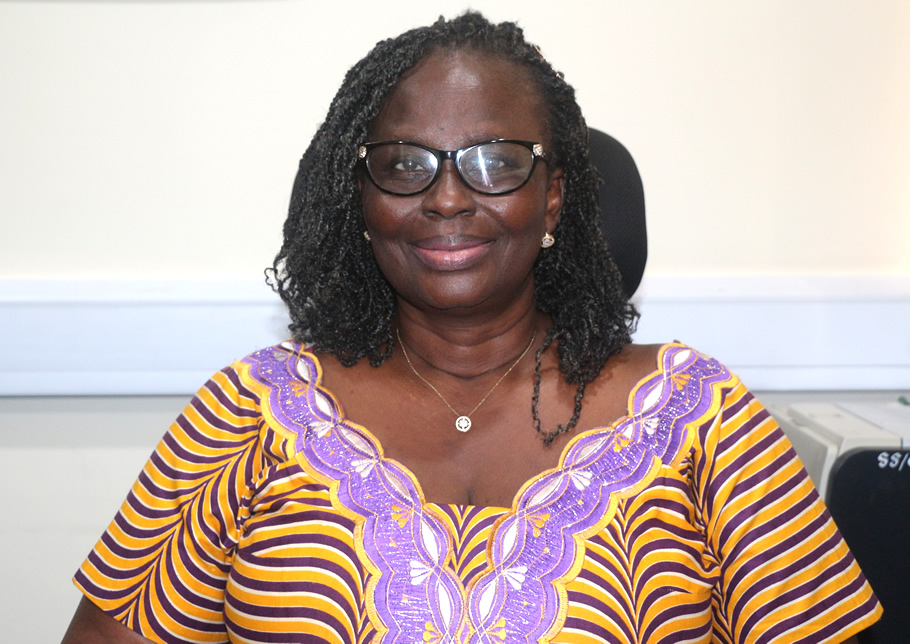
Gertrude Oforiwa Fefoame, Ghanaian gender and disability rights advocate

Gertrude Oforiwa Fefoame (born 1957) is a Ghanaian gender and disability rights advocate and the first person with a disability to have received the Excellence Grand Medal Award in 2007 from President John Kufuor. Born in Akropong, Ghana, she overcame significant barriers to education to become the first person with a visual impairment to earn a master's degree from both the Ghana Institute of Management and Public Administration and the Akrofi-Christaller Institute. She is the Global Advocacy Advisor on Disability and social inclusion at Sightsavers, and has worked for over 28 years in local and international effots to advance the rights of people with disabilities. Her activism focuses on the intersecting discrimination faced by women with disabilities, particularly in regard to access to education, healthcare, and employment.

== Personal life ==
Gertrude Oforiwa Fefoame was born Christian on September 23rd in 1957 in Akropong, Akuapim South District, in the Eastern Region (Ghana), a two hour drive from Accra. She grew up near the School for the Blind and knew people who taught there and were blind.

Gertrude struggled through her primary exams because the board would not give her large print papers she could read. After struggling through primary school exams, Gertrude’s family decided to enroll her in the School for the Blind so she could learn to typewrite and read and write Braille.

Her visual impairment was caused by Retinopathy, a genetic eye condition that leads to decreased vision over time. She has three children with her husband.

=== Schooling ===
==== Education in Ghana ====
By age 10, she had started experiencing problems with her sight. By the age fourteen, the Ghana Senior High School in Koforidua was no longer able to provide her with a strong enough prescription for her to be able to read the blackboard or textbooks. Gertrude had to rely on teachers and classmates who were willing to take time to complete work with her. She finished her Form Five in Science but struggled during practical sections in chemistry when she had to cut, color, and label things she couldn’t see.

Gertrude struggled through her primary exams because the board would not give her large print papers she could read. After struggling through primary school exams, Gertrude’s family decided to enroll her in the School for the Blind so she could learn to typewrite and read and write Braille.

In 1975, Gertrude was seventeen years old and ran into members of her extended family while leaving the Akropong School for the Blind. Her family told her that the loss of her vision would lead to the loss of her prospects and bright future. She began to internalize these messages and became depressed, believing that she would not have a bright future because she was now blind.

==== College and Further Education ====
Post-independence, Ghana quickly developed constitutional protections that, on paper, promised inclusion and adequate disability legislation; frameworks built on colonial legal and institutional structures. Students like Gertrude who sought quality education had to compete with elite school graduates on merit alone while applying for teritary placement, despite sub optimal educational opportunities.

The failure of Ghanaian disability law falls hardest on those at the intersection of disability, poverty, and gender. Those in rural areas that do not have ready access to medical care, accessible infrastructure, or special education are lessed served by Ghana’s constitutional law.

=== Family ===
Gertrude has three daughters, Eugest Zevi Motogbe, Eunice Diede Fefoame, and Eugenia Nibie Fefoame, with her husband, John Vital Fefoame. Gertrude partially credits her ability to travel for her advocacy to her husband who stepped in to take care of their children when they were young.

== Activism ==
=== Early Interactions and Inspirations ===
Gertrude credits her activism to an encounter with a young blind woman from the school of Presbyterian College of Education, Akropong. This young woman had graduated from high school and furthering her education in college. The perseverance through the adversity of blindness reminded Gertrude of her own difficulties and reinvigorated her passions for helping people with disabilities and fighting for equity for women.

As a blind woman, Gertrude faced discrimination on two fronts. Women with disabilities have limited access to employment and technology, and often their inputs are dismissed. Gertrude believes that activism is the only way to attain equity for both women and people with disabilities.

The intersecting discrimination against women with disabilities is understudied and creates a point of focus for Gertrude’s activism.

==== Limiting Factors ====
Gertrude experienced discrimination because of her disability while young. Ghana ranks in the bottom 25% for women in state affairs, education, workforce, and life expectancy worldwide. Women with disabilities are much less likely to receive health care, be employed, and are more likely to be illiterate.

=== Accomplishments and Awards ===
Gertrude was the first person with a visual impairment to earn a master’s degree from the Ghana Institute of Management and Public Administration and from the Akrofi-Christaller Institute.

As the first African woman to serve as chair of the UNCRPD, Fefoame has received numerous accolades and recognitions throughout her life.

Gertrude took part in the Grand Challeneges in Global Eye Health: A Global Prioritisation Process using Delphi Method, a world-wide project with the goal of categorizing and ranking the importance of issues facing people with visual impairment.

== Career ==
As at 2018, she had worked extensively for 28 years in both local and international front to better the lives of persons with disabilities. In 2018, she was appointed through election to the United Nations committee on the Convention on the Rights of Persons with Disabilities (CRPD). She is the Global Advocacy Advisor and lead person on disabilities and social inclusion with Sightsavers.

Gertrude is the Vice Chair for Africa International Council for People with Visual Impairment and a board member of the Ghana Federation of Disability Organizations and the National Council of Persons with Disabilities.

Gertrude took part in the panel for "Grand Challenges in Global Eye Health: A Global Prioritisation Process using Delphi Method" that identitified key issues that must be addressed to improve eye health.

=== United Nations ===
Gertrude was the first African woman to lead the Committee on the Rights of Persons with Disabilities. In this role, she oversees the implementation of the Convention on the Rights of Persons with Disabilities.
