= FPR =

FPR may refer to:

== Companies ==
- Fidelity Printers and Refinery, a Zimbabwean security printer

== Law ==
- Family Procedure Rules, in English and Welsh family courts
- Fichier des personnes recherchées, a French database of wanted people
- Freiwillige Polizei-Reserve, former Berlin police

== Politics and military ==
- Rwandan Patriotic Front (French: Front patriotique rwandais)
- Popular Front for Recovery (French: Front Populaire pour le Redressement), a militia in Chad and the CAR

== Sports ==
- Ford Performance Racing, Australia
- Portuguese Rugby Federation (Portuguese: Federação Portuguesa de Rugby)

== Technology ==
- Film-type patterned retarder
- Floating-point register
- Filter performance rating
- False positive rate

== Other uses ==
- Final proposal revision, a form of response to a request for proposal
- Focal point review, for employee evaluation
- Formyl peptide receptor
- Foundation for Psychocultural Research, Los Angeles, US
- Treasure Coast International Airport, Florida, US, IATA Code
- First Philippine Republic, Former country get Independence from Spain
