= Ghana Society for the Blind =

National non-profit organization

The Ghana Society for the Blind is the official body that advocates for the improvement of life for the blind in Ghana. The federation is headed by Yaw Ofori Debrah. In April 2010, the Ghana Society for the Blind merged with the Ghana Association of the Blind, and the Ghana Blind Union was formed.
