= Kofi Dzamesi =

Ghanaian engineer & politician (born 1959)

Minister for Chieftaincy and Religious Affairs
- In office 10 February 2017 – 7 March 2021
- President: Nana Akufo-Addo
- Preceded by: Henry Seidu Daanaa
- Succeeded by: Ebenezer Kojo Kum

Volta Regional Minister
- In office February 2005 – January 2009
- President: John Agyekum Kufour
- Preceded by: Kwasi Owusu-Yeboa
- Succeeded by: Joseph Amenowode

Personal details
- Born: Samuel Kofi Ahiave Dzamesi; 3 April 1959 (age 67) Ghana
- Party: New Patriotic Party
- Education: Accra Academy
- Alma mater: Kwame Nkrumah University of Science and Technology
- Profession: Engineer

Samuel Kofi Ahiave Dzamesi (born 1959) is a Ghanaian politician who was chief executive of the Bui Power Authority from 2021 to 2025. A member of the New Patriotic Party, he was Minister for Chieftaincy and Religious Affairs in Ghana from 2017 to 2021 in the Akufo-Addo administration and has been Regional Minister for the Volta Region from 2005 to 2008 under the John Kufour administration.

== Early life and education ==
Dzamesi was born on 3 April 1959. His hometown is Dzodze in the Volta Region. He attended the Kave LA Primary School and the Kpelikorpe LA Primary School in Kpelikorpe. He went on to the Roman Catholic Middle School in Bole. He had O-level certificate education at St. Martins Secondary School in Nsawam from 1972 to 1978 and A-level certificate education at the Accra Academy from 1978 to 1980. He received a bachelor of science degree in mechanical engineering from Kwame Nkrumah University of Science and Technology after studies from 1983 to 1986. He is also a holder of a diploma in Marketing.

== Political life ==
=== Service under John Kufuor ===
In 2001, Dzamesi was appointed deputy Volta Regional minister. In 2004 he received popular acclamation at the Ketu North New Patriotic Party primaries. He went on to contest the constituency election. He lost to the National Democratic Congress candidate. However, when the New Patriotic Party won the 2004 general election, President John Agyekum Kufour appointed Dzamesi as the substantive regional minister for the Volta Region. In 2007, Dzamesi was selected as the NPP parliamentary candidate for Ketu North for the December 2008 parliamentary election.

In June 2008, an intruder broke into the residence of the regional minister with the aim of assassinating Dzamesi. The intruder was shot dead by police and house security. Dzamesi was out of town at the time of the incident.

=== Further political life ===
In 2014, Dzamesi was elected a member of the national council of the New Patriotic Party. Prior to the 2016 general election, Dzamesi was appointed the chair of the New Patriotic Party's select committee on chieftaincy affairs. In 2017, he transitioned from this role to be appointed as Minister for Chieftaincy and Religious Affairs by President Akufo-Addo to replace Henry Seidu Daanaa.

Dzamesi was the parliamentary candidate on the NPP ticket in 2012, 2016 and 2020 for the Ketu North seat. In 2020, he commissioned a 3 units classroom block at Agordeke in the Ketu North Constituency and cut sod for the construction 20 seater WC toilet at Tadzewu. That year, he again lost the parliamentary contest. President Akufo-Addo did not re-appoint to government ministerial post, Dzamesi and all other government ministers who lost at the 2020 parliamentary elections in his second presidential term.

== Minister of Chieftaincy and Religious Affairs ==
On 7 January 2017, President Nana Akuffo-Addo nominated Dzamesi for the position of Minister of Chieftaincy and Religious Affairs. He was vetted by the appointments committee of the Parliament of Ghana on 8 February 2017. During his vetting he made known to the committee that he would set up a royal college in Ghana to educate chiefs and traditional rulers on the need to avoid partisan politics. Up to that point there was open campaigning and public endorsement of certain political parties during elections.

Dzamesi was approved by parliament and sworn in by Akuffo-Addo on 10 February 2017. His appointment was hailed by people of the Volta Region as it demonstrated the all-inclusive agenda of the New Patriotic Party, since traditionally, the people of the Volta Region vote for the National Democratic Congress.

=== Ministerial work ===
Dzamesi has engaged feuding factions in various chieftaincy disputes in the country in an effort to find lasting solutions for peace. There are about 352 chieftaincy disputes in Ghana. He has also set up a committee to strategise and promote yearly Christian pilgrimages from Ghana to Israel and other sites in the Christian world.
