= Committee on the Rights of Persons with Disabilities =

United Nations body

The Committee on the Rights of Persons with Disabilities is a United Nations body of 18 experts that meets two times a year in Geneva to consider the reports submitted by 164 UN member states (Note: As of March 2015. "UN Treaty Collection: parties to the Convention on the Rights of Persons with Disabilities: List of parties". United Nations. Archived from the original on 19 August 2012.) on their compliance with the Convention on the Rights of Persons with Disabilities (CRPD), and to examine individual petitions concerning 94 States Parties (Note: As of March 2015. "UN Treaty Collection: Optional Protocol to the Convention on the Rights of Persons with Disabilities: List of parties". United Nations. Archived from the original on 13 January 2016.) to the Optional Protocol.

The committee is one of ten UN human rights treaty bodies, each responsible for overseeing the implementation of a particular treaty. The Human Rights Committee, the Committee on the Elimination of Discrimination Against Women, and the Committee on the Rights of the Child are among the other United Nations treaty bodies.

UN member states that have ratified or acceded to the Optional Protocol have agreed to allow persons within their jurisdiction to submit complaints to the Committee requesting a determination whether provisions of the Convention have been violated.

All states parties are required to submit regular reports to the Committee outlining the legislative, judicial, policy and other measures they have taken to implement the rights affirmed in the convention. The first report is due within two years of ratifying the convention; thereafter reports are due every four years. The Committee examines each report and addresses its concerns and recommendations to the state party in the form of "concluding observations".

The members of the committee, who must be "of high moral standing and recognized competence and experience in the field covered by the present Convention", are elected by the member states on an individual basis or "personal capacity", not as representatives of their countries. CRPD Article 34 also mandates "balanced gender representation" and "participation of experts with disabilities." They serve four-year terms, with one-half of their number elected every second year.

The Office of the High Commissioner for Human Rights assists the work of the committee, and maintains a website with links to all documentation considered by the committee, and documents issued by the committee, such as concluding observations on state reports.

== History ==
Following the Convention coming into force on 3 May 2008, the initial membership of the committee was elected by secret ballot at the first Conference of States' Parties to the convention on 3 November 2008 in New York. The first chair, elected at the first session in February 2009, was Mohammed Al-Tarawneh, who was succeeded in February 2010 by Ron McCallum. The current chair is Rosemary Kayess of Australia, whose term lasts until the end of 2022.

The Committee initially consisted of 12 members, however once the Convention achieved 80 ratifications the Committee expanded to 18 members. Half of members were elected for two-year terms and half elected for four years. Since then, members have been elected for four-year terms, with half the members elected every two years by the Conference of States Parties.

== Membership ==
The membership of the committee is as follows (as of January 2026):

Name	State	Term expires (Note: All terms expire on 31 December of the year shown. "Membership". United Nations. 17 November 2023.)
Muhannad Salah Al-Azzeh	Jordan	2026
Rehab Mohammed Boresli	Kuwait	2026
Magino Corporán Lorenzo	Dominican Republic	2028
Gerel Dondovdorj	Mongolia	2028
Mara Cristina Gabrilli	Brazil	2028
Amalia Gamio Ríos - Vice Chair	Mexico	2026
Natalia Guala Beathyate	Uruguay	2028
Laverne Jacobs - Rapporteur	Canada	2026
Rosemary Kayess	Australia	2026
Miyeon Kim - Chairperson	South Korea	2026
Alfred Kouadio Kouassi	Ivory Coast	2026
Abdelmajid Makni - Vice Chair	Morocco	2028
Floyd Morris	Jamaica	2028
Christopher Nwanoro - Vice Chair	Nigeria	2028
Gertrude Oforiwa Fefoame	Ghana	2026
Inmaculada Placencia Porrero	European Union	2028
Markus Schefer	Switzerland	2026
Hiroshi Tamon	Japan	2028

== Review of Parties' Periodic Reports ==
The Parties to the convention are to submit periodic reports to the committee. Before the report is due, the Committee provides a List of Issues, created with input from civil society. Often a "shadow report" will be submitted by non-government organizations (NGOs). Ultimately, the Committee agrees on a set of Concluding Observations. As described in the CRPD's Article 35, parties' reports should describe "measures taken to give effect to its obligations under the ... Convention and ... the progress made in that regard" and may also describe "factors and difficulties" affecting their fulfilment of Convention obligations. Similar to the record of other human rights bodies, most reports have been submitted late, some not at all.

In 2013, the Committee issued Simplified Reporting Procedures. The committee's intent was not only to assist states parties, but also to foster interest from and participation by persons with disabilities, national monitoring groups, and human rights organizations.

== General Comments ==
The committee has issued eight General Comments, intended to offer interpretation of CRPD provisions that will be useful for states in preparing their periodic reports. These are:

Comment	CRPD Article	Subject	Date Adopted
General Comment No 1	Article 12	Equal recognition before the law	11 April 2014
General Comment No 2	Article 9	Accessibility	11 April 2014
General Comment No 3	Article 6	Women and girls with disabilities	26 August 2016
General Comment No 4	Article 24	Right to inclusive education	26 August 2016
General Comment No 5	Article 19	Right to independent living	31 August 2017
General Comment No 6	Article 5	Equality and non-discrimination	9 March 2018
General Comment No 7	Article 4.3 and 33.3	Participation with persons with disabilities in the implementation and monitoring of the Convention	21 September 2018
General Comment No 8	Article 27	Right of persons with disabilities to work and employment	9 September 2022

Two examples of General Comments that attracted experts and organizations' analysis, with areas of agreement and of disagreement were General Comment No. 4 on CRPD Article 24, the right to inclusive education, and General Comment No. 6 on CRPD Article 5, the right to equality and non-discrimination. In the 2016 deliberations, several organizations argued unsuccessfully that a "sensory exception" to inclusive education would not risk perpetuating harmful practices of school segregation. In the 2018 deliberations, some experts and organizations debated which kinds of employment policies would most effectively address disability discrimination.
