= 2020 Summer Paralympics closing ceremony =

Closing ceremony

- Part of 2020 Summer Paralympics
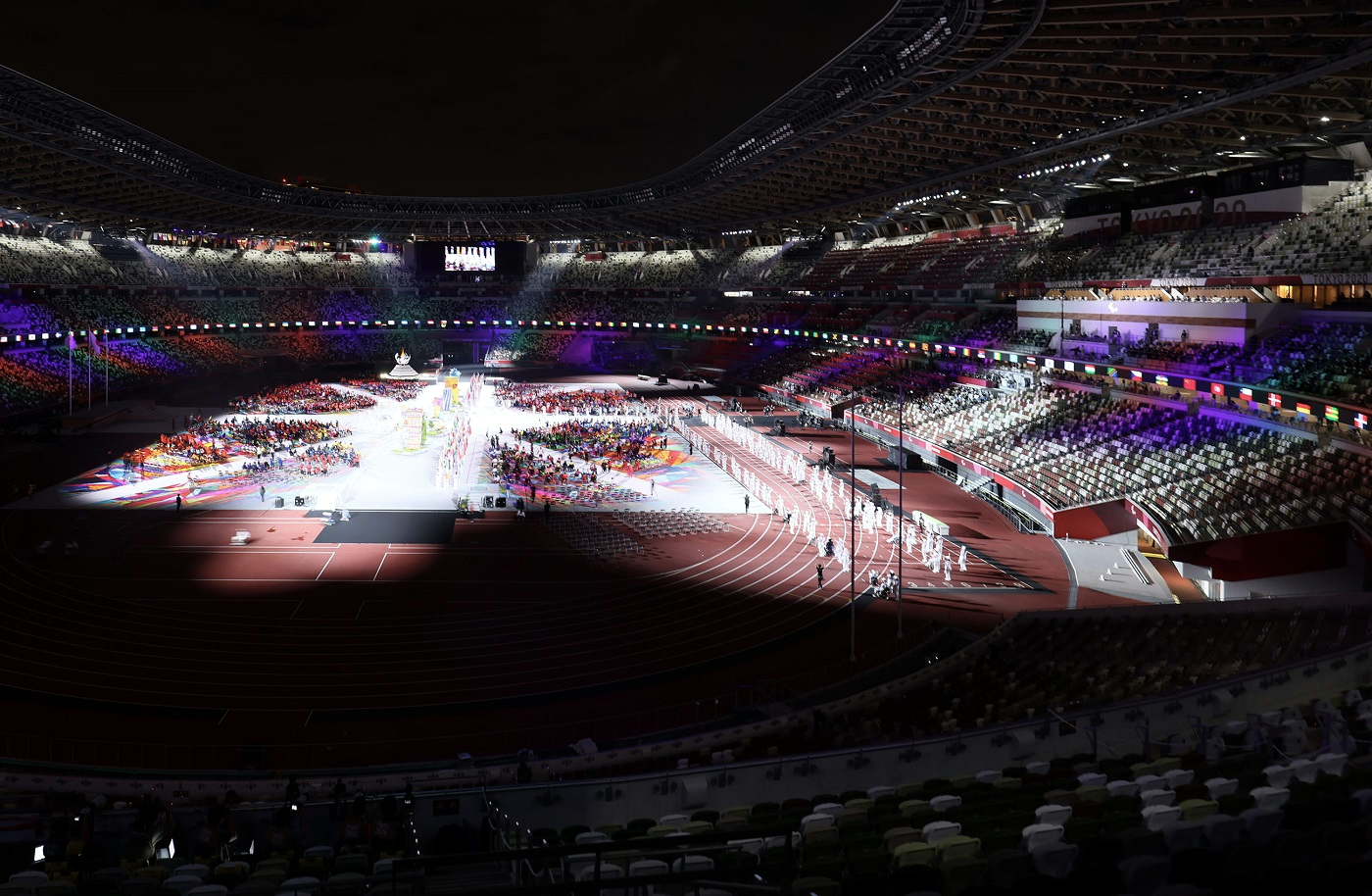
- closing ceremony
- Date: 5 September 2021; 4 years ago
- Time: 20:00 - 22:03 (JST)
- Venue: Olympic Stadium
- Location: Tokyo, Japan
- Theme: "Moving Forward: Harmonious Cacophony"
- Filmed by: Olympic Broadcasting Services (OBS)
- Footage: The ceremony on the IPC YouTube channel on YouTube

The closing ceremony of the 2020 Summer Paralympics took place on 5 September 2021 at Olympic Stadium in Tokyo, Japan.

== Weather conditions ==
- 20:00 temperature 21.6 °C (70.9 °F) humidity 82%
- 22:00 temperature 21.2 °C (70.2 °F) humidity 80%
- No precipitation

== Venue ==
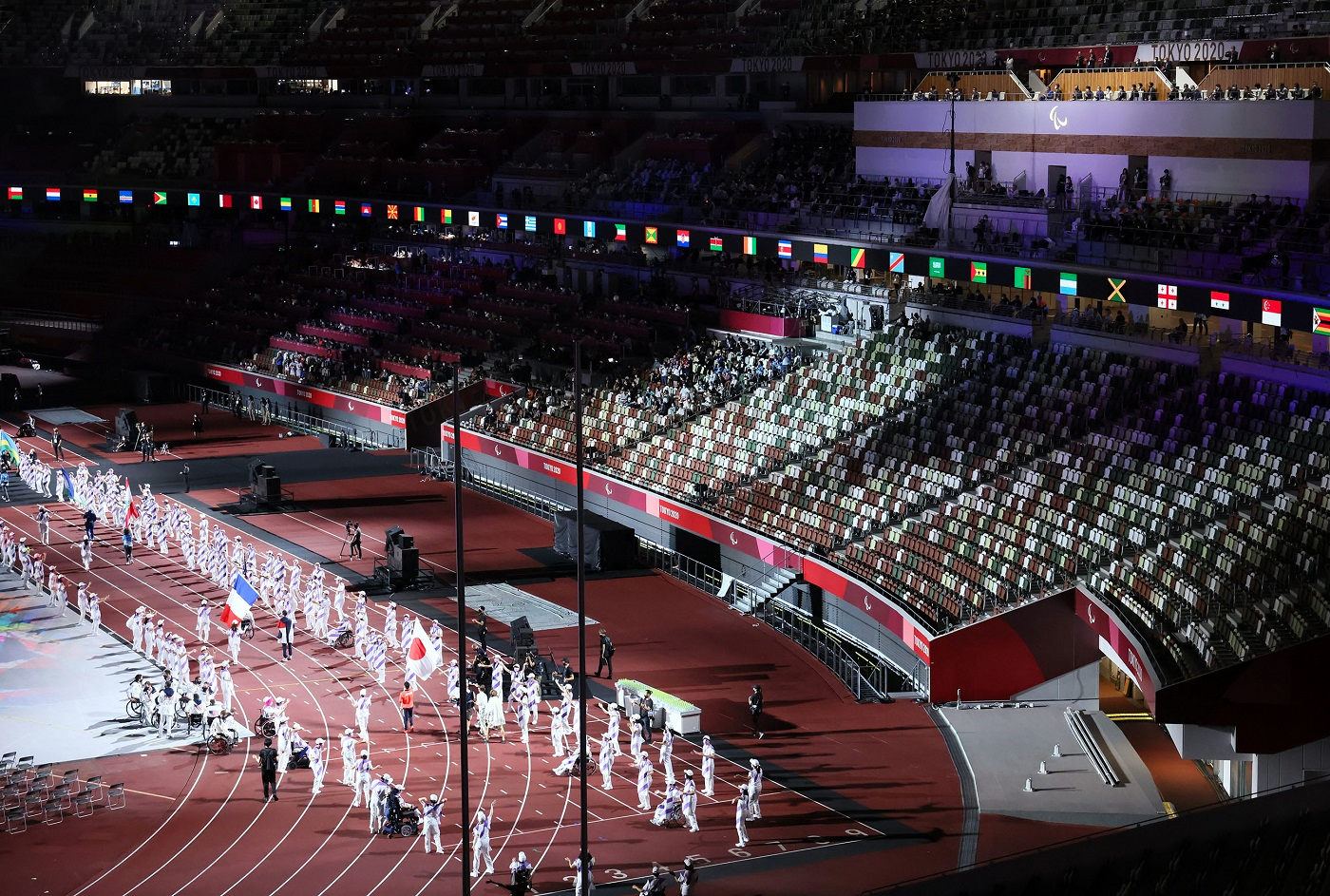
Athletes

The New National Stadium served as the main stadium for the closing ceremony. Demolition of the old National Stadium was completed in May 2015, followed by the construction of the new stadium which began at the same site on 11 December 2016. The stadium was handed over to the IPC on 30 November 2019 for necessary games and ceremony preparations. Capacity during the Paralympic Games will be 60,102 taking into account press and executive seating areas.

== Performers ==
The announcers at all ceremonies were Mai Shoji (English) and Hiroyuki Sekino (Japanese).

== Antwerp Ceremony ==
The new Paralympic flag presented in 2019 was passed by the Governor of Tokyo Yuriko Koike to IPC President Andrew Parsons who then handed the flag over to the Mayor of Paris Anne Hidalgo and waved the flag eight times. It was followed by the raising of the flag of France and the playing of its Anthem, which was performed in sign language by Betty Moutoumalaya.

=== Presentation of Paris 2024 ===
After the anthems, for about three minutes played to music by Yoann Lemoine (Woodkid), 126 dancers including 19 disabled people, performed choreography inspired by Sadek Belaba. Meanwhile, the dancers, sitting in black clothes, continued to express themselves by simply moving their arms, ending with "PARIS 2024" by putting together the capital letters that are the names of their next destinations. Finally, hip-hop artist Pone performed with just his eyes after being diagnosed with ALS in 2015. Like in the Olympics closing ceremony held 28 days earlier, this was followed by a crowd at the Trocadéro that gathered with French Paralympic athletes who returned from Tokyo and Paris 2024 President Tony Estanguet celebrating their achievements, concluding with a large purple Paris 2024 Paralympics flag flown onto the Eiffel Tower.

== Dignitaries in attendance ==
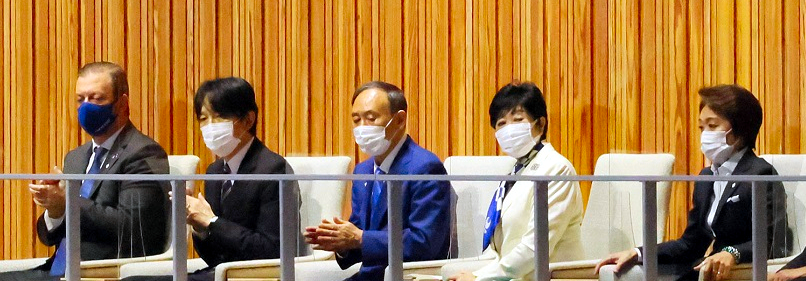
Andrew Parsons, Crown Prince Fumihito, Yoshihide Suga, Yuriko Koike and Seiko Hashimoto (5 September 2021)

- France – Minister of Culture Roselyne Bachelot
- Japan – Crown Prince Fumihito, Prime Minister Yoshihide Suga, Governor Yuriko Koike

== Anthems ==
- National Anthem of Japan
- Paralympic Anthem
- National Anthem of France – Betty Moutoumalaya (in French Sign Language)

== WeThe15 ==
The #WeThe15 movement was showcased as part of the ceremony.

== See also ==
- 2020 Summer Olympics opening ceremony
- 2020 Summer Olympics closing ceremony
- 2020 Summer Paralympics opening ceremony
