= National Commission on Culture =

Government of Ghana agency

The National Commission on Culture (NCC) is a Government of Ghana agency responsible for cultural matters. It is under the Ministry of Tourism, Culture and Creative Arts. As at 2026, Wakefield Ackuaku is the Executive Director of the National Commission on Culture.
