= Kupenda for the Children =

American non-profit organization

Kupenda for the children
- Founded: 2003; 23 years ago
- Founder: Cynthia Bauer and Leonard Mbonani Bikanga
- Type: International NGO
- Tax ID no.: 16-1644867
- Purpose: Humanitarian aid
- Location: Hampton, New Hampshire, U.S.
- Origins: Kenya
- Region served: Worldwide
- Key people: Cynthia Bauer, US CEO; Leonard Mbonani Bikanga, Kenya Executive Director
- Website: kupenda.org

Kupenda for the Children is an American 501(c)(3) non-profit organization that transforms harmful beliefs and practices surrounding disability to those that improve children's lives.

== History ==
In 1999, Leonard Mbonani, a Kenyan special education teacher, met Cynthia Bauer, an American graduate student conducting wildlife research on the coast of Kenya. Cynthia, who was born without her left hand, discovered that many people in Kenya believed disabilities like hers were caused by curses and learned that, had she been born there, she may have even been killed.

After Leonard introduced Cynthia to children with disabilities who did not have access to medical care or education, the two began working together to respond. They focused on improving access to education and medical care for children with disabilities while also addressing the stigma surrounding disability in the first place.

In 2003, in response to these needs and their growing efforts, Kupenda ("love" in Kiswahili) for the Children was officially registered as a nonprofit with the vision of a fully-integrated society where people of all abilities have access to health, education, and a loving community.

Today, Kupenda's programs center on providing education, medical care, livelihoods and economic empowerment, and stigma reduction and advocacy. By training community leaders, families, and children with disabilities themselves as disability advocates, Kupenda also promotes local ownership and sustainability. These programs are now being adopted by nonprofits, governments, and other organizations worldwide.

== Strategy and Programs ==
In many areas of the world, people with disabilities are viewed as cursed, leading to their neglect, abandonment, abuse, rape, or even murder. Kupenda's programs exist to transform harmful beliefs and practices surrounding disability into those that improve children's lives, including:

- Stigma Reduction & Advocacy Program - Educating families and communities about the rights of children with disabilities and how to support them by advocating for their medical care, education, legal rights, and inclusion in all aspects of society.
- Education Program - Educating families and communities about the rights of children with disabilities and their need for inclusion in all aspects of society
- Medical Care Program - Connecting children with disabilities to appropriate medical services, including surgeries, medications, and therapy
- Livelihoods & Economic Empowerment - Supporting youth with disabilities and parents and caregivers of children with disabilities to access trainings, coaching, and microloans that enable them to earn sustainable incomes

== Partner Organization ==
Kupenda for the Children is registered in the U.S., and its partner organization, Kuhenza for the Children, is registered in Kenya. Both organizations report to their respective national governments, manage their own operational funds, and are overseen by their own boards of directors. Each year, Kuhenza and Kupenda collaboratively fundraise to support their joint projects. The organizations have been co-designing and co-implementing disability programs since 2003.

== Where We Work ==
Kupenda's innovation center is in Kilifi County, Kenya, but the organization's disability advocacy approaches and tools have been used by 74 nonprofit and government entities in 30 countries including: Benin, Burkina Faso, Burundi, Dominican Republic, DRC, Ecuador, El Salvador, Ethiopia, Gambia, Ghana, Guatemala, Haiti, Honduras, Kenya, Liberia, Malawi, Mexico, Mozambique, Nicaragua, Niger, Peru, The Philippines, Rwanda, Sierra Leone, Sudan, Tanzania, U.S., Uganda, Zambia, and Zimbabwe.

== Beneficiaries ==
Kupenda works with children and youth who have long-term disabilities including physical, cognitive, sensory, and emotional health issues. They use the United Nations' definition of disability, which includes "those who have long-term physical, mental, intellectual or sensory impairments, which in interaction with various barriers, may hinder their full and effective participation in society on an equal basis with others." Some examples of their beneficiaries' disabilities include albinism, attention deficit hyperactivity disorder (ADHD), autism spectrum disorder (ASD), blindness and visual impairment, brittle bone disease (osteogenesis imperfecta), cerebral palsy (CP), cleft lip and palate, clubfoot, Down syndrome, dwarfism, dyslexia, epilepsy, fetal alcohol syndrome disorders (FASD), generalized anxiety disorder, hearing loss or deafness, hydrocephalus, limb loss or reduction, major depression, microcephaly, muscular dystrophy, obsessive-compulsive disorder, post-traumatic stress disorder (PTSD), reactive attachment disorder (RAD), schizophrenia, spina bifida (SB), spinal cord injury, spine curvature disorders; Tourette syndrome, and traumatic brain injury (TBI).

== Activities ==
1998 – Cindy Bauer first travels to Kenya as a biologist and learns about the challenges Kenyan children with disabilities face.

1999 – Cindy meets Leonard, a Kenyan special need teacher, who introduces her to children with disabilities on the coast of Kenya.

2000-2002 – Cindy and Leonard collaborate on small-scale projects to raise funds and awareness for the children.

2003 – Cindy registers Kupenda for the Children in the U.S. as an official 501(c)3 nonprofit.

2006 – A significant growth period allows Cindy and Leonard to formalize Kupenda's programs and hire a full-time staff.

2008 – To improve locally led, long-term solutions, Cindy and Leonard found Kuhenza for the Children and register this affiliate organization in Kenya.

2009 – A teacher's death due to false information from her church inspires Kupenda and Kuhenza to develop a spiritual advocacy program.

2013 – Kupenda's disability course equips local leaders to address disability in their communities.

2014–present – Rising national and global interest in Kupenda's advocacy model sparks broader impact.

2017–2018 – Under a grant from the United Kingdom's Department for International Development (DFID), Kupenda conducted an 18-month, mix-method program evaluation that showed how UN Disability Training Program for Community Leaders were effective in reversing negative beliefs about disability.

2021 – Releases a documentary film Kupenda that is awarded Best Long Documentary at the Inclús, Barcelona International Disability Film Festival, and screened at ReelAbilities and Beloit International Film Festival.

2022 – Kupenda becomes a member of the International Disability and Development Consortium.

2022 – Joins a USAID-project led by Action Against Hunger USA as a project resource partner.

== Technical Services ==
Kupenda focuses on improving justice, care, and inclusion for children with disabilities and their families. In FY25, the organization reported improving the lives of 309,208 children with disabilities in low- and middle-income countries. Based on the organization's 23 years of disability program design and implementation experience, Kupenda, in collaboration with Kuhenza, has provided technical services and training models directly to individuals and through training programs for other disability organizations, including:

- Training and counseling for individuals with disabilities, their families, and community leaders
- Development, adaptation, and testing of disability inclusion training materials and resources
- Community or program disability needs assessments
- Disability program monitoring, evaluation, and research
- Consultation on disability inclusion programming, policies, and best practices
- Disability grant/proposal research and writing support
