= New Zealand contributions to human rights instruments =

New Zealand has taken an active role in the negotiation and drafting of several international human rights instruments including the Universal Declaration of Human Rights, the Convention on the Rights of Persons with Disabilities, and the Second Optional Protocol to the International Covenant on Civil and Political Rights.

== Universal Declaration of Human Rights ==
New Zealand made a number of contributions in the lead up to and in the drafting of the United Nations Declaration of Human Rights (UDHR) adopted by the United Nations General Assembly on 10 December 1948.

=== United Nations Conference on International Organization ===
Its first involvement came in 1945 when a New Zealand delegation led by then Prime Minister Peter Fraser, attended the United Nations Conference on International Organization held in San Francisco. This conference resulted in the creation of the United Nations Charter, the founding document of the United Nations (UN).

At the time of the conference, Chapter One which sets out the purposes and principles of the proposed UN made no reference to human rights and fundamental freedoms. In light of this, New Zealand proposed a new paragraph be inserted in the Article 1 stating that "All members of the organisation undertake to preserve, protect and promote human rights and fundamental freedoms, and in particular the rights of freedom from want, freedom of speech and freedom of worship."

The amendment was not incorporated but there are several references to human rights and fundamental freedoms in both the Preamble and in Article 1 which stipulates one of the purposes of the United Nations as being:

To achieve international co-operation in solving problems of an economic, social, cultural, or humanitarian character, and in promoting and encouraging respect for human rights and for fundamental freedoms for all without distinction as to race, sex, language, or religion.

=== Commission on Human Rights ===
New Zealand's second major contribution occurred in relation to a draft Declaration sent to UN member governments by The United Nations Commission on Human Rights in 1947.

A special Human Rights Committee composed of the Solicitor-General, the Director of Education, the Director of the New Zealand Council of Educational Research, and four academics at Victoria University College (now Victoria University of Wellington), was formed to comment on the draft. Subject to a few minor changes, its findings were sent to the commission as the New Zealand Government's views. New Zealand was one of the only countries to make such a submission.

=== Paris Assembly 1948 ===
Again led by Peter Fraser, a delegation attended a number of meetings held by the General Assembly's Third Committee in Paris to comment on the final drafting of the UDHR.

Originally, New Zealand expressed the view that the Declaration should not be adopted at the Paris Assembly. Rather, the International Bill of Rights consisting of the Declaration, Covenant and measures of implementation, should be adopted as a whole. The reason for this view was that it was thought that adopting the Declaration first, intended to be a statement of principles with moral effect only, would prejudice the preparation of the Covenant. This was particularly so given that, unlike the Declaration, the Covenant created legal obligations.

Eventually, New Zealand conceded to the majority view and agreed that immediately adopting the Declaration was necessary for matters to progress. It did, however, successfully put forward a resolution calling on the Commission on Human Rights to continue to give priority to the Covenant and measures of implementation.

New Zealand's final contribution involved a proposal to alter the wording in Article 23(4) which is concerned with trade unions. Originally, the text read: "Everyone is free to form and join trade unions" but after the Third Committee accepted a New Zealand wording, now reads "Everyone has the right to form and join trade unions for the protection of his interests."

== Convention on the Rights of Persons with Disabilities ==
New Zealand contributed significantly to the co-ordination and drafting of the Convention on the Rights of Persons with Disabilities (CRPD) which was adopted by the General Assembly on 13 December 2006 and came into force on 3 May 2008.

New Zealand first became involved in July 2002 when the Ad Hoc Committee, established by the General Assembly to consider proposals for a convention, held its first meeting. Represented by the New Zealand Permanent Representative to the United Nations, Don MacKay, the New Zealand Office for Disability Issues and the Ministry of Foreign Affairs and Trade(MFAT) delivered a formal statement to the meeting.

The statement:

- acknowledged that a new convention would promote and advance the rights of disabled people.
- requested that the Committee strengthen existing human rights mechanisms and ensure disability perspectives are included in monitoring the six core UN human rights treaties.
- declared, with reference to the New Zealand Disability Strategy, the importance of involving disabled people and NGOs in the future work on the committee.
- stated that New Zealand looked forward to participating in forthcoming meetings of the committee and to examining proposals in more depth.

Following this meeting and subsequent discussions led by the Human Rights Commission and members of the disability community in New Zealand, the New Zealand Government formally agreed to participate in the Convention negotiations in May 2003.

It demonstrated this commitment by funding a delegation to attend the second Ad Hoc Committee meeting at the UN in New York in June 2003. The delegation included several government officials and two representatives from the disability community. At the meeting, the delegation put forward a proposal to establish a working group which would:

- consist of 27 State representatives including five from the ‘Western European and Others Group’ of which New Zealand is a member, 12 non-governmental representatives selected NGOs themselves, and one representative from Human Rights Institutions
- meet for 10 working days in New York early 2004
- prepare and circulate a draft text for negotiation at least three months before the (proposed) third session of the Ad Hoc Committee.

This proposal was subsequently adopted by the Committee and the Working Group was formed.

The Government again demonstrated its commitment to the development of the a convention when it made a written submission to the Working Group in November 2003. The submission stipulated a number of recommendations as to the approach, structure, and scope of the proposed convention.

New Zealand was given the opportunity to put these views forward further when, represented by the Director of the Office of Disability Issues, Dr Jan Scown, it was granted a place on the Working Group in December 2003.

As proposed, the Working Group met in New York for two weeks in January 2004 to develop a draft convention text. At its first meeting on 5 January, New Zealand Ambassador, Don MacKay, was appointed to co-ordinate the group. It also included Jan Scown as the New Zealand delegate and New Zealander Robert Martin as a representative of NGO Inclusion International.

Presented to the third Ad Hoc Committee meeting held from 24 May to 4 June 2004, the draft text acted as a basis for negotiation by member states and other stakeholders. New Zealand continued its active participation by again attending this Ad Hoc Committee meeting. Its official delegation included both government representatives from the Office for Disability Issues and MFAT and non-government representatives from Disabled Person's Assembly (DPA) New Zealand.

Following this meeting, members of the New Zealand delegation sought feedback on the draft developed by the Working Group from both New Zealand government agencies and the disability community. This was used to inform the principles the delegation would aim to promote in future negotiations.

The general negotiating principles the New Zealand delegation were guided by included:

- to promote partnerships between government and non-government organisations in national and international negotiations related to disability issues.
- to promote outcomes consistent with the principles and purposes of the New Zealand Disability Strategy, New Zealand legislation and in international human rights instruments to which New Zealand is already a party.
- to facilitate agreement between countries to a Convention text.

Negotiations continued at the fourth session of the Ad Hoc Committee from 23 August to 3 September 2004. New Zealand was again represented by a delegation of officials from the Office of Disability Issues and MFAT; by New Zealand Ambassador Don MacKay; and by Gary Williams, CEO of the Disabled Person's Assembly. At the meeting, New Zealand co-ordinated discussions on the draft convention text.

Negotiations on the proposed convention text resumed from 24 January to 4 February 2005. New Zealand continued to be actively involved through the presence of representatives from the Office of Disability Issues, the Like Minds Like Mine national consumer advisory group and the Human Rights Commission working in partnership with the MFAT and staff of the New Zealand Permanent Mission to the United Nations.

New Zealand's leadership was further endorsed when Don MacKay was appointed as Chair of the Ad Hoc Committee in April 2005.

In August 2005, MacKay, along with a delegation of representatives from the Office for Disability Issues, the Mental Health Commission, the Human Rights Commission and DPA, led further discussions on the proposed convention text at an Ad Hoc Committee session in New York.

Negotiations continued into 2006 where from 16 January to 3 February, the Ad Hoc Committee held its seventh session, the goal of which was to complete a full reading of the draft text prepared by Chair Don MacKay in order to produce a final set of draft articles. New Zealand was again represented by a delegation of government and non-government officials whose goal was to use consultation data gathered from disabled New Zealanders and the New Zealand Disability Strategy to strengthen the existing text.

By the end of the meeting, the committee had agreed upon the content of the majority of the draft articles, which according to chair Don MacKay, were "very well supported". The next session was scheduled for August, which MacKay proposed be focused on the remaining substantive issues within the text rather than the content or linguistic nature of the articles. He challenged states to return willing to compromise in order not to delay the adoption of the convention.

The meeting was held from 14 to 25 August 2006. New Zealand again brought a delegation which this time consisted of officials from the Office of Disability Issues, MFAT and the Human Rights Commission and members of DPA and a mental health consumer advocacy group. A significant outcome of the meeting was the establishment of a Drafting Committee tasked with ensuring uniformity of terminology throughout the text of the draft convention, harmonizing the versions in the official languages of the United Nations and reporting on the results of its work to the Ad Hoc Committee.

On 5 December 2006 at a meeting in New York, Drafting Committee chair Stefan Barriga presented the results of its work to the Ad Hoc Committee, still chaired by New Zealander Don MacKay. The Committee forwarded this draft report with the final text of the Convention on the Rights of Persons with Disabilities and the optional protocol to the General Assembly for adoption.

The Convention and its Optional Protocol were officially adopted by the Plenary of the General Assembly by consensus on 13 December 2006.

On 30 March 2007, it opened for signatures. New Zealand signed it alongside 81 other nations at a signing ceremony in at the UN in New York. New Zealand was represented by Minister for Disability Issues, Ruth Dyson, who spoke at the ceremony.

New Zealand ratified the convention on 25 September 2008. It continues to monitor its progress in the implementation of the Convention in accordance with Article 35 through monitoring reports, the first of which was submitted to the UN in March 2011.

The United Nations Committee on the Rights of Persons with Disabilities is scheduled to review its implementation in New Zealand September 2014.

== Second Optional Protocol to the International Covenant on Civil and Political Rights ==
New Zealand also contributed to the Second Optional Protocol to the International Covenant on Civil and Political Rights, aiming at the abolition the death penalty.
