= International Federation of Hard of Hearing Young People =

Non-governmental organization

- Abbreviation: IFHOHYP
- Formation: 1968
- Founded: 1968
- Type: Non-governmental organization
- Purpose: Hearing impairment
- Region served: Worldwide
- Method: Direct action, lobbying, awareness, research, innovation
- President: Bowen Tang
- Vice-President: Kave Noori
- Secretary: Paulina Lewandowska
- Treasurer: Koen Swaans
- Website: www.ifhohyp.org

The International Federation of Hard of Hearing Young People (IFHOHYP) is an international federation for organizations of hearing impaired young people. In general, the mission of IFHOHYP is to defend and promote the rights and interests of hard of hearing youth worldwide.

IFHOHYP works closely with the International Federation of Hard of Hearing People and with EFHOH (European Federation of Hard of Hearing People). Also, IFHOHYP cooperates with the Council of Europe, where is a member of the Advisory Council on Youth for the period (2009–2011). An outcome of this cooperation are the IFHOHYP Study Sessions, in which relevant topics concerning the hearing impairment are worked. IFHOHYP is an associate member of the European Disability Forum.

== Members of IFHOHYP ==
Members in 2010:

| Organization | Country |
|---|---|
| Bangladesh Protibandhi Kallyan Somity (BPKS) | Bangladesh |
| Association des Sourds du Faso (A.S.F.) | Burkina Faso |
| Association Sportive des Sourds du Burkina Faso (ASSB) | Burkina Faso |
| Czech Union of the Deaf | Czech Republic |
| Høreforeningen | Denmark |
| Kuuloliitto | Finland |
| Bundesjugend | Germany |
| Bekol | Israel |
| A.F.a.M.U.T. | Italy |
| Association of Hard of Hearing People of Republic of Moldova (HOHAM "AUZ") | Moldova |
| SH-Jong | Netherlands |
| Hørselshemmedes Landsforbunds Ungdom (HLFU) | Norway |
| Danishkadah | Pakistan |
| Fund of Assistance to Disabled Children and Youth (FADCY) | Russia |
| Centar za Razvoj Inkluzivnog Društva (CRID) | Serbia |
| Solidarita Mladých Nedoslýchavých (SOMNED) | Slovakia |
| Bonaventura | Spain |
| Unga Hörselskadade | Sweden |
| Jugehörig | Switzerland |
| Uganda Federation of Hard of Hearing (UNAHOH) | Uganda |
| Hochiminh Deaf Association (HDA) | Vietnam |
