= International Federation of Hard of Hearing People =

Non-governmental organization

- Abbreviation: IFHOH
- Founded: 1977; 48 years ago
- Type: Non-governmental organization
- Purpose: To promote greater understanding of hearing loss issues, and to improve access for hard of hearing people.
- President: Avi Blau
- Website: www.ifhoh.org

The International Federation of Hard of Hearing People (IFHOH) was established in 1977 as an international, non-governmental organization, registered in Germany. IFHOH represents the interests of more than 300 million hard of hearing people worldwide. This includes late deafened adults, cochlear implant users, and people who experience tinnitus, Meniere's disease, hyperacusis and auditory processing disorders. IFHOH has over 40 national member organizations from most regions of the world. IFHOH and the European Federation of Hard of Hearing People (EFHOH) work to promote greater understanding of hearing loss issues and to improve access for hard of hearing people. IFHOH has special consultative status with the United Nations Economic and Social Council (ECOSOC), affiliation with the World Health Organization, and membership in the IDA.

== See also ==
- International Federation of Hard of Hearing Young People
