= Action Against Hunger =

Global humanitarian aid organization

- Formation: 1979
- Type: Non-profit
- Purpose: To end child hunger whilst providing communities with access to safe water and amazing solutions to hunger.
- Headquarters: New York, USA; Toronto, Canada; London, UK; Paris, France; Madrid, Spain; Mumbai, India; Milan, Italy
- Region served: Over 51 countries around the world
- Staff: Over 7000
- Website: www.actioncontrelafaim.org (FR) www.actionagainsthunger.org (US) www.actionagainsthunger.org.uk (UK) www.actioncontrelafaim.ca (CA) www.accioncontraelhambre.org (ES) www.actionagainsthunger.in (IN) www.azionecontrolafame.it (IT)

Action Against Hunger (French: Action Contre La Faim - ACF) is a global humanitarian organization which originated in France and is committed to ending world hunger. The organization helps malnourished children and provides communities with access to safe water and sustainable solutions to hunger.

Action Against Hunger worked in 56 countries around the world with more than 8,990 employees helping 28 million people in need.

Action Against Hunger was established in 1979 by a group of French doctors, scientists, and writers. Nobel Prize-winning physicist Alfred Kastler served as the organization's first chairman. Currently, Mumbai-based businessman and philanthropist Ashwini Kakkar serves as International President of Action Against Hunger network.

The group initially provided assistance to Afghan refugees in Pakistan, famine-stricken Ugandan communities, and Cambodian refugees in Thailand. It expanded to address additional humanitarian concerns in Africa, the Middle East, Southeast Asia, the Balkans, and elsewhere during the 1980s and 1990s. Action Against Hunger's Scientific Committee pioneered the therapeutic milk formula (F100), now used by all major humanitarian aid organizations to treat acute malnutrition. Early results showed that treatment with F100 has the capacity to reduce the mortality rate of severely malnourished children to below 5%, with a median hospital fatality rate quoted of 23.5%. A few years later, the therapeutic milk was repackaged as ready-to-use therapeutic foods (RUTFs), a peanut-based paste packaged like a power bar. These bars allow for the treatment of malnutrition at home and do not require any preparation or refrigeration.

The international network currently has headquarters in eight countries – France, Germany, Spain, the United States, Canada, Italy, India, and the UK. Its four main areas of work include nutrition, food security, water and sanitation, and advocacy.

The integrated approaches with various sectors of intervention are:

- Nutrition and Health
- Water, Sanitation and Hygiene
- Food Security & Livelihoods
- Emergency Response

In 2022, Action Against Hunger USA is leading a USAID-funded project to address health and nutrition challenges associated with policy, advocacy, financing, and governance in communities around the world, and will work in partnership with leading organizations such as Pathfinder International, Amref Health Africa, Global Communities, Humanity & Inclusion, Kupenda for the Children, and Results for Development.

== Restaurants against hunger ==
Action Against Hunger partners with leaders from the food and beverage industry to bring attention to global hunger. Each year, several campaigns are run by the network to raise funds and support the organisation's programs : Restaurants Against Hunger and Love Food Give Food.

== Countries of intervention ==
In 2022, Action Against Hunger International Network is present in 56 countries:

=== Africa ===
Burkina Faso, Burundi, Cameroon, Ivory Coast, Ethiopia, Kenya, Liberia, Malawi, Madagascar, Mali, Mauritania, Niger, Nigeria, Uganda, Central African Republic, Democratic Republic of the Congo, Senegal, Sierra Leone, Somalia, South Sudan, Sudan, Tanzania, Chad, Zimbabwe, Zambia

=== Asia ===
Bangladesh, Myanmar, Cambodia, India, Indonesia, Nepal, Pakistan, Philippines, South Caucasus

=== Caribbean ===
Haïti

=== Europe ===
Armenia, Turkey, Ukraine, Moldova, Romania, Poland

=== Middle East ===
Afghanistan, Lebanon, Syria, Palestinian Occupied Territories, Yemen, Jordan, Iraq

=== Latin America ===
Colombia, Guatemala, Nicaragua, Paraguay, Peru, Honduras, Venezuela

== Action Against Hunger international network ==
Since 1995 Action Against Hunger developed an international network to have a bigger global impact.

The Network has headquarters around the world: France, Germany, Spain, the United Kingdom, the United States, Canada, India, and Italy.

Action Against Hunger has also a West Africa Regional Office (WARO) located in Dakar, a Horn and Eastern Africa Regional Office in Nairobi, and five logistic platforms (Lyon, Paris, Barcelona, Dubai, Panama).

This network increases the human and financial capacities and enables specialisation per headquarter.

- Action Against Hunger in France, Spain and the USA are the operational headquarters. They manage the interventions directly on the field. In order to maximize efficiency and coherence, these three operational headquarters work under the principle of one headquarter per country of intervention.
- Action Against Hunger UK focuses on research, monitoring and evaluation, notably with Hunger Watch. The UK headquarters also plays an intermediary role with DFID.
- Action Against Hunger Canada raises public and private funds in North America and plays an increasing role on the national level.
- Action Against Hunger / Azione contro la Fame Italia raises private funds and promotes important campaigns in order to sensitize the Italian public opinion on hunger and malnutrition.

== See also ==
- 2006 Trincomalee massacre of NGO workers
