= Tuasa =

Tuasa is a village in the Upper West Region of Ghana.

== Famous sons ==
- Henry Seidu Daanaa - Ghana's first trained blind lawyer and minister for chieftaincy and traditional affairs.
