= World report on disability =

The World report on disability (WRD) is the first document to give an extensive global picture of the situation of people with disabilities, their needs, and the barriers they face to participating fully in their societies. The aim of the report is to support the implementation of the Convention on the Rights of Persons with Disabilities (CRPD). Published in 2011 by the World Health Organization (WHO) and the World Bank, the report assembles scientific information on disability, with relevance to the fields of public health, human rights and development. The intended audience is policy-makers, service providers, professionals, and advocates for people with disabilities and their families. The WRD was developed with participation of people with disabilities and their organizations, as well as other relevant stakeholders.

== Key findings ==
- More than 1 billion persons in the world have some form of disability. This corresponds to about 15% of the world's population. Between 110 and 190 million people have very significant difficulties in functioning.
- People with disabilities are more likely to be unemployed than non-disabled people. In Organisation for Economic Co-operation and Development countries, the employment rate of people with disabilities (44%) is slightly over half that for people without disabilities (75%).
- People with disabilities often do not receive needed health care. Half of disabled people cannot afford health care, compared to a third of non-disabled people. People with disabilities are more than twice as likely to find health-care providers' skills inadequate; nearly three times more likely to be denied health care; and four times more likely to report being treated badly than non-disabled people.
- Children with disabilities are less likely to attend school than non-disabled children. Education completion gaps are found across all age groups in all settings, with the pattern more pronounced in poorer countries. Even in countries where most non-disabled children go to school, many children with disabilities do not go to school. For example, in Bolivia about 98% of non-disabled children go to school, but under 40% of disabled children attend school. In Indonesia, over 80% of non-disabled children go to school, but less than 25% of children with disabilities go to school.
- People with disabilities experience increased dependency and restricted participation in their societies. Even in high-income countries, 20–40% of people with disabilities lack the help they require to engage in everyday activities. In the United States of America, 70% of adults with disabilities rely on family and friends for assistance with daily activities.

== Main messages ==
- Disability prevalence is high and growing, due to aging populations and the increase in chronic conditions. Other factors like road traffic crashes, violence and disasters contribute to the growing numbers in certain contexts.
- Disability disproportionately affects vulnerable populations (women, older people and those who are poor).
- Disability is very diverse, despite the stereotypical view of a disabled person as a wheelchair user.
- People with disabilities face barriers in accessing services (health, education, employment, and transport, among others).
- Many of the barriers people with disabilities face are avoidable, and the disadvantages associated with disability can be overcome.

== Recommendations ==
As well as a series of specific recommendations, the WRD highlighted nine cross-cutting recommendations, as follows:

1. Enable access to all mainstream systems and services
2. Invest in programmes and services for people with disabilities
3. Adopt a national disability strategy and a plan of action
4. Involve people with disabilities
5. Improve human resource capacity
6. Provide adequate funding and improve affordability
7. Increase public awareness and understanding about disability
8. Improve the availability and quality of data on disability
9. Strengthen and support research on disability.

== Press coverage ==
The launch of the World report on disability on 9 June 2011 at the United Nations headquarters in New York received widespread media coverage. Global and national media outlets such as The Guardian, Washington Post, The Globe and Mail, Sydney Morning Herald, Le Nouvel Observateur, La Nacion, The Hindu, Gazeta, El Pais and others covered the launch. Broadcasters such as CNN, BBC Radio, Al Jazeera English, Fox News and Voice of America also ran stories on the report, as did many news agencies: Associated Press, Agence France-Press, Deutsche Presse Agentur, The Canadian Press and Panapress.

== Follow-up ==
The global launch has been followed up with national launches in many countries including Argentina, Australia, Austria, Brazil, Canada, Chile, China, Ireland, Finland, Germany, Ghana, Netherlands, Myanmar, The Philippines, Slovakia, Sri Lanka, Togo, Turkey, Turkmenistan, USA as well as in the European Parliament. The goal of national launches and policy dialogues is to help countries to use the WRD as a tool to strengthen their domestic policy and provision and/or international development work. Many countries now have national plans of action on disability, in line with the report's recommendation and/or are working to implement the CRPD, with the aid of the report.

Implementing the recommendations of the WRD will require a strong commitment from a broad range of stakeholders. While national governments are expected to take on the most significant role, other actors can make important contributions. The report makes concrete recommendations on how United Nations agencies, Disabled People's Organizations, service providers, academic institutions, the private sector, communities and people with disabilities and their families can help translate the report into action. WHO is developing supporting materials, such as a model disability survey, guidelines on rehabilitation, and training on community-based rehabilitation to further assist disability work in countries.
