= Deaf Child Worldwide =

UK charity supporting deaf children worldwide

Deaf Child Worldwide is the international development arm of the National Deaf Children's Society.

It is a member of the International Disability and Development Consortium (IDDC).
