= Laverne Jacobs =

Canadian law professor and disability rights expert

Laverne Jacobs (born 1972) is a Canadian law professor and disability rights expert who is the first Canadian member of the United Nations Committee on the Rights of Persons with Disabilities.

== Early life and education ==
Jacobs was raised in Scarborough, Ontario. She graduated from McGill University in 1994 with a degree in French literature. She went to McGill University Faculty of Law, specializing in administrative law. She graduated in 1999 with an LL.B. and a B.C.L. She earned a Ph.D. from Osgoode Hall Law School at York University in 2009. Jacobs experienced a spinal cord injury as an adult and uses a wheelchair.

== Career ==
Jacobs is a Full Professor and legal scholar at the University of Windsor Faculty of Law where she was the first associate dean for research. She has worked as an adjudicator and mediator of the Human Rights Tribunal of Ontario, and has been a member of Ontario's Accessibilty Standards Advisory Council. She founded the Law, Disability and Social Change Project in 2014. Their work directly led to the creation of the Accessible Canada Act. She is also Co-Director of the Disability Rights Working Group at Berkeley Law’s Center for Comparative Equality & Anti-Discrimination Law.

Jacobs believes in creating laws and policies with ‘first order equality,’ that have inclusion of people with disabilities as an initial focus and not an afterthought. She was the editor and lead author for Law and Disability in Canada: Cases and Materials, the first Canadian disability law textbook. Her disability and anti-racism advocacy work combine to create an intersectional approach to legislation and policymaking.

She was the first Canadian to be elected to a four-year term on the United Nations Committee on the Rights of Persons with Disabilities in 2022, an 18-person international committee.

== Honors and awards ==
Jacobs received the Canadian Bar Association’s Touchstone Award in 2021 and the Canadian Association of Law Teachers Academic Excellence Award in 2022.
