= Ministry for Chieftaincy and Religious Affairs =

Government ministry of Ghana

Ministry of Chieftaincy and Traditional Affairs
- Coat of Arms

Agency overview
- Jurisdiction: Government of Ghana
- Headquarters: Accra
- Agency executive: Kofi Dzamesi, Minister
- Website: www.ghana.gov.gh

The Ministry for Chieftaincy and Traditional Affairs is the official Ghanaian agency responsible the creation of linkages between the Government of Ghana and the traditional authorities in the country. Based on recommendations by the African Peer Review Mechanism and the citizenry the Jerry John Rawlings administration established the ministry to address the recommendations. The Ministry was set up in 1993 and is backed by the Civil Service Law, 1993 (PNDC Law 327). Prior to its establishment, its functions were performed by two agencies namely the Chieftaincy Division Secretariat under the Office of the President and the Culture Division under the National Commission on Culture.

== Organizations under the ministry ==
=== Houses of Chiefs ===
- 1 National
- 16 Regional
- 196 Traditional Councils

=== National Commission on Culture ===
- 1 National Secretariat
- 10 Regional Offices
- 138 District Offices

=== National Theatre of Ghana ===
- National Theatre Company of Ghana
- National Symphony Orchestra
- National Dance Company

== Affiliated organizations ==
=== Institutions ===
- College of Art and Social Sciences, Kwame Nkrumah University of Science and Technology (KNUST), Kumasi
- School of Performing Arts, University of Ghana, Legon
- Institute of African Studies, University of Ghana, Legon
- Centre for Cultural and African Studies, KNUST, Kumasi
- Department of Archaeology, University of Ghana, Legon

=== Associations (Arts) ===
- Ghana Association of Visual Artists (GAVA)
- Musicians Union of Ghana (MUSIGA)
- Ghana Union of Theatre Association (GHATA)
- Ghana Association of Writers (GAW)
- Ghana Dance Association (GDA)
- Ghana Concert Parties Union (GCPU)
- Ghana Culture Forum (GCF)

== Relations with international bodies ==
- UNESCO
- KwaZulu Natal Provincial Government South Africa
- The British Museum, U.K.
- African, Caribbean and Pacific Countries (ACP)

== Vision ==
The vision of this Ministry is to preserve, sustain and integrate the regal, traditional and cultural values and practices to accelerate wealth creation and harmony for total national development.

== Mission ==
Its mission is to educate chiefs on Government of Ghana's policies for good governance, conflict resolutions among the various cultural groupings. Also by supporting the various chieftaincy and cultural institutions administratively, financially and review the various chieftaincy and cultural legal framework to conform to international best practices.

== Objectives ==
The objectives of this Ministry are to:

- Provide institutional capacity to the departments and agencies under the Ministry for efficient, effective and sustainable service delivery.
- Formulate and supervise the implementation of national and sectoral policies and programmes
- Promote political tolerance and national stability through the mediums of the arts and diplomacy.
- Promote public and internal relationship within the sectors of chieftaincy and culture
- Monitor and evaluate activities of the Chieftaincy and Culture Sectors.

== Functions ==
The Ministry performs the following functions:

- Initiate, formulate and ensure the efficient and effective implementation of policies, plans, programmes and projects for the sectors.
- Preserve, conserve, develop, promote and present Ghanaian heritage institutions, arts, architecture, cultural sites and values to project the unique Ghanaian identity and national pride.
- Co-ordinate, monitor and evaluate the performance of the institutions and affiliated associations within the Sectors and devise appropriate strategies for improving performance delivery of each organisation.
- Organise periodic Sectoral Review Conferences for all stakeholders in the Ministry to re–examine the direction and focus of the Ministry in line with prevailing Government policies to help update sector policies, plans, programmes and projects.

== See also ==
- Government of Ghana
- UNESCO
- KwaZulu Natal
- Musicians Union of Ghana
