= Yaw Ofori Debrah =

Ghanaian disability rights activist

Yaw Ofori Debrah (or Yaw Ofori Debra) is a Ghanaian disability rights activist and chairman of the National Council for Persons with Disabilities. He was formerly the president of the Ghana Federation of Disability Organizations, the umbrella body that advocates for the various disability groups in Ghana. Prior to that, he was president of the Ghana Blind Union and vice president of the African Union of the Blind. In 2018, the United States Embassy in Ghana awarded Debra the Martin Luther King, Jr. Award for Peace and Social Justice for his activism and work focused on people with disabilities and disability rights.
