= International Disability and Development Consortium =

- Abbreviation: IDDC
- Location: Brussels, Belgium
- Coordinates: 50.83354°N 4.36407°E
- Region served: worldwide
- Leader: Mary Keogh
- Staff: 2 (2026)
- Website: www.iddcconsortium.net

The International Disability and Development Consortium (IDDC) is an international network of non-governmental organisations (NGOs). It is dedicated to promoting the human rights and inclusion of persons with disability in the context of international development cooperation.

IDDC's work is driven by task groups in which members work together. They are essential for achieving IDDC's objectives.

== History ==
=== Origins (1993–1994) ===
The origins of IDDC trace back to 1993, when the Italian organisation Associazione Italiana Amici di Raoul Follereau (AIFO) convened a meeting in Rome of ten international NGOs working on disability and leprosy in developing countries. The participants identified a shared need for stronger coordination, communication, and cooperation among implementing organisations active in these fields.

Building on this momentum, the network was formally established in Oslo in 1994 under the name International Disability Consortium (IDC). Its founding purpose was to pool knowledge and expertise so that member organisations could operate more effectively. Over time, the network expanded its activities to include advocacy actions directed at governments, international agencies, and development donors. Its goal remained to advance the rights of persons with disabilities around the globe.

=== Growth and Expansion (1997–2007) ===
In 1997, IDC supported the creation of the Enabling Education Network (EENET) and joined the International Working Group on Disability and Development, a body composed primarily of donor governments and United Nations agencies. One year later, the network adopted its current name to better reflect its emphasis on development cooperation.

By 2000, IDDC had become a member of the World Health Organization (WHO) Rehabilitation Unit's strategy support group. In 2006, it contributed to the drafting of the UN Convention on the Rights of Persons with Disabilities (CRPD), particularly regarding the principle of inclusive development. In 2007, IDDC was formally registered in Brussels as an international non-profit association under Belgian law.

=== Policy Influence and Advocacy (2010–2021) ===
In 2010, IDDC collaborated with the WHO, the International Labour Organization (ILO), and UNESCO to develop guidelines on community-based rehabilitation (CBR). In 2015, alongside the International Disability Alliance (IDA), IDDC successfully advocated for the explicit inclusion of disability in the 2030 Agenda for Sustainable Development.

In 2016, the organisation became an Advisor to the Global Action on Disability (GLAD) Network and launched the first European Disability and Development Week (EDDW). It adopted a new strategy for the period 2018–2021, and in 2019 received a recognition award from the International Disability Alliance for its contributions to advancing disability rights; that same year it marked its 25th anniversary.

IDDC became a full member of the GLAD Network in 2020. The following year, the United Nations granted IDDC "consultative status" with the Economic and Social Council (ECOSOC), recognising its standing as an international civil society actor in the field of disability and development.

== Membership ==
As of January 2026, IDDC has 35 members organisations:

- Able Child
- ADD International
- Associazione Italiana Amici di Raoul Follereau
- Atlas Alliance
- Bezev
- CBM Christian Blind Mission
- CBM Global Disability Inclusion
- Deafblind International
- Deaf Child Worldwide
- Disability Partnership Finland
- Disabled People’s Organisations Denmark (DPOD)
- EU-CORD
- FAIRMED
- FOAL
- GDIhub
- HelpAge International
- Humanity & Inclusion
- ICEVI
- Inclusion International
- International Foundation for Electoral Systems
- International Federation of Anti-Leprosy Associations
- Keystone Human Services International
- Kupenda for the Children
- Light for the World
- Liliane Fonds
- MyRight
- Norwegian Association of Disabled
- Organismo di Volontariato per la Cooperazione Internazionale la Nostra Famiglia (OVCI)
- Redd Barna (Save the Children Norway)
- SeeYou Foundation
- Sense International
- Sightsavers International
- SPOON
- TAF Africa Foundation
- Voluntary Service Overseas

Past members include:

- Dutch Coalition on Disability and Development
- Finnish Disabled People's International Development Association
- Leonard Cheshire Disability
- Platform Disability and Development Cooperation
- Swedish Organisation of Disabled Persons International Aid Association
- The Leprosy Mission International
- World Vision UK
