= International Disability Alliance =

The International Disability Alliance (IDA), created in 1999, is an umbrella organization focused on improving awareness and rights for individuals with disabilities around the globe. The IDA works with Non Governmental Organizations (NGO's), supranational organizations such as the United Nations (UN), as well as state governments in order to create legislation, fund disability programs in developing and industrialized countries, and advocate for people with disabilities around the world. The IDA works very closely with the United Nations, and in particular they use the United Nations Convention on the Rights of Persons with Disabilities (UNCRPD) as their code of conduct.

On June 7, 2013, the IDA became legally incorporated and given legal status as an entity. What this means is that it has greater strength in its ability to negotiate better terms for people with disabilities.

== Leadership ==
The International Disability Alliance is governed by its full members and through the IDA Board, which is made up of representatives from each of its full members. All IDA members are organizations majority-led by and composed of persons with disabilities and their families. The Alliance's day-to-day activities are carried out by the IDA Secretariat, made up of fourteen people, based in New York and Geneva, that oversees and guides the agenda. The leader of this secretariat is its Executive Director Vladimir Cuk. According to LinkedIn, Cuk has a Master's degree in disability studies, and previously held the position of director of the New York Secretariat of the IDA.

Vladimir Cuk has been extensively involved with the U.N in its mission to better implement practices that improve lives of people with disabilities. In a speech to the U.N. Cuk outlined problems in the way the U.N was classifying people with disabilities, worried that it would give countries the ability to not follow through on implementing new reforms. "If we cannot give clear recommendations, member states have an excuse not to disaggregate data. So for us it is a red flag, and we are gravely worried we are witnessing these disagreements within the U.N. system."

Cuk also attended a meeting of the International Committee of the Red Cross in which he lobbied for countries to put in place measures to take care of individuals with disabilities during natural disasters and humanitarian crises. Cuk said "In both wealthy and poor countries, we are getting reports that people with disabilities are the last to be reached and the last to be rescued. This results in a significantly disproportionate number of deaths for people with disabilities."

== Mission ==
The UNCRPD created a framework regarding how countries should treat people with disabilities. The IDA's goal is to enforce these rules on a country by country basis. In a letter to the UN Office of the High Commissioner on Human Rights (UNOHCHR), the IDA clearly stated their mission, "newborns with disabilities are murdered in different regions across the world for want of a family's capacity or willingness to take care of a child considered to be a burden." The IDA's mission is to change the way people regard people with disabilities. In many places around the world people with disabilities are regarded as defective or as the IDA put it "a burden." Through their 2030 initiative, the IDA hopes to have new services up and running to achieve this loss of stigma by 2030.

The IDA is working to help the UN implement their sustainable development goals, which provide a framework of standards countries should abide by. The IDA is particularly interested in goal #8 which specifically mentions persons with disabilities having the ability to become contributing members of society

== Advocacy ==
The IDA, along with its member organizations, lobbied the UN Council on Human Rights in order to advocate the fair treatment of women and children with disabilities. This proposal was made to the UN Committee on the Rights of the Child and the Committee on the Elimination of Discrimination against Women and Harmful Practices. This Committee focuses on the fair treatment of women; however, the IDA broadened this to include women with disabilities because this population is particularly vulnerable. The proposal outlines several practices that they would like to see abolished such as the rape of women with disabilities and the forced abortion of children who will be disabled.

In 2018 the IDA in partnership with the International Disability and Development Consortium, wrote a position paper focused on how countries need to change their financing practices in order to better accommodate people with disabilities. These topics include changing the wording of laws to ensure persons with disabilities have the right to access social programs. In many developed countries, no citizen is barred from having access to social programs like welfare, however in under developed countries this right does not exist.

== Current projects ==
Through the World Federation of the Deaf the IDA is receiving funds from the Finnish government to provide resources for the deaf in Algeria, Libya, Mauritania, Morocco and Tunisia.

Member organization Down Syndrome International is working on creating an international cardiac health protocol for individuals with Down Syndrome. This would give doctors around the world a set of guidelines on how to treat people with Down syndrome.

Member organization Inclusion International has filed a third party intervention in the Romanian court case Stoian v Romania in order to advocate for more inclusion in the Romanian school system.

The IDA along with the United Kingdom have plans to host a global summit, with world leaders and businesses, in order to further the cause of rights for individuals with disabilities.

In January 2018, the IDA met with other disability advocates, and presented case studies of people with disabilities in various countries around the world. They did this both to highlight deficiencies in how countries are handling issues of inclusion, and to highlight growth in cases where good changes have taken place.

== Member organizations ==
- Down Syndrome International (DSI)
- Inclusion International (II)
- International Federation of Hard of Hearing People (IFHOH)
- International Federation for Spina Bifida and Hydrocephalus (IF)
- World Blind Union (WBU)
- World Federation of the Deaf (WFD)
- World Federation of Deafblind (WFDB)
- World Network of Users and Survivors of Psychiatry (WNUSP)

The regional member organisations are:

- African Disability Forum (ADF)
- Arab Organization of Disabled People (AODP)
- European Disability Forum (EDF)
- The Latin American Network of Non-Governmental Organizations of Persons with Disabilities and their Families (RIADIS)
- Pacific Disability Forum (PDF)

IDA works in affiliation with bodies of the United Nations in apprising DPOs on the status of the rights of people with disabilities according to most current observations and in accordance with treaty signatories.
