= Focal point review =

A focal point review (FPR) is a human resources process for employee evaluation.
