= Ghana Federation of Disability Organizations =

The Ghana Federation of Disability Organizations, formerly Ghana Federation of the Disabled, is the umbrella body that advocates for the various disabled groups in Ghana.
