= 2025 Ærø municipal election =

Municipal election in Denmark

← 2021	18 November 2025	2029 →

All 15 seats to the Ærø municipal council 8 seats needed for a majority
- Turnout: 3,948 (80.0%) ▲2.2%
	First party	Second party	Third party
	A	C	Æ
Party	Social Democrats	Conservatives	Denmark Democrats
Last election	4 seats, 21.4%	3 seats, 13.8%	Did not stand
Seats won	6	3	2
Seat change	▲2	0	▲2
Popular vote	1,169	751	397
Percentage	30.0%	19.3%	10.2%
Swing	▲8.5%	▲5.4%	New
	Fourth party	Fifth party	Sixth party
	F	T	V
Party	Green Left	Tværpolitisk Liste	Venstre
Last election	1 seat, 6.1%	Did not stand	1 seat, 9.5%
Seats won	1	1	1
Seat change	0	▲1	0
Popular vote	331	285	265
Percentage	8.5%	7.3%	6.8%
Swing	▲2.4%	New	▼2.7%
	Seventh party	Eighth party
	O	E
Party	Danish People's Party	Ærø i Centrum
Last election	1 seat, 7.2%	1 seat, 7.0%
Seats won	1	0
Seat change	0	▼1
Popular vote	136	142
Percentage	3.5%	3.6%
Swing	▼3.7%	▼3.4%
Mayor before election
Peter Hansted
Social Democrats
Mayor after election
Peter Hansted
Social Democrats

The 2025 Ærø Municipal election was held on November 18, 2025, to elect the 15 members to sit in the regional council for the Ærø Municipal council, in the period of 2026 to 2029. Peter Hansted from the Social Democrats, would secure re-election.

== Background ==
Following the 2021 election, Peter Hansted from Social Democrats became mayor for his first term. He would run for re-election, If successful, he would become the first politician to be mayor for consecutive terms in the municipality, since its creation in 2006.

== Electoral system ==
For elections to Danish municipalities, a number varying from 9 to 31 are chosen to be elected to the municipal council. The seats are then allocated using the D'Hondt method and a closed list proportional representation. Ærø Municipality had 15 seats in 2025.

== Electoral alliances ==
=== Electoral Alliance 1 ===
Party		Political alignment
A	Social Democrats	Centre-left
E	Ærø i Centrum	Local politics
F	Green Left	Centre-left to Left-wing

=== Electoral Alliance 2 ===
Party		Political alignment
B	Social Liberals	Centre to Centre-left
C	Conservatives	Centre-right

=== Electoral Alliance 3 ===
Party		Political alignment
I	Liberal Alliance	Centre-right to Right-wing
O	Danish People's Party	Right-wing to Far-right

=== Electoral Alliance 4 ===
Party		Political alignment
V	Venstre	Centre-right
Æ	Denmark Democrats	Right-wing to Far-right

== Results by polling station ==
Division	A	B	C	E	F	I	L	O	T	V	Æ
Division	%	%	%	%	%	%	%	%	%	%	%
Marstal	18.6	5.3	33.9	4.8	7.6	4.0	1.7	6.3	11.8	1.3	4.7
Ærøskøbing	43.3	1.7	6.5	1.6	8.9	1.8	5.6	0.8	4.1	11.0	14.7
Søby	31.4	1.5	8.8	4.7	9.8	2.0	10.7	2.0	2.6	11.9	14.6

== Results ==
Party		Votes	%	+/-	Seats	+/-
Ærø Municipality
A	Social Democrats	1,169	29.97	+8.55	6	+2
C	Conservatives	751	19.26	+5.44	3	0
Æ	Denmark Democrats	397	10.18	New	2	New
F	Green Left	331	8.49	+2.36	1	0
T	Tværpolitisk Liste	285	7.31	New	1	New
V	Venstre	265	6.79	-2.70	1	0
L	Lokallisten Ærø	186	4.77	New	0	New
E	Ærø i Centrum	142	3.64	-3.37	0	-1
O	Danish People's Party	136	3.49	-3.75	1	0
B	Social Liberals	128	3.28	+0.32	0	0
I	Liberal Alliance	110	2.82	New	0	New
Total		3,900	100	N/A	15	N/A
Invalid votes		16	0.32	-0.08		
Blank votes		32	0.65	-0.05		
Turnout		3,948	80.00	+2.21		
Source: valg.dk

== Opinion polls ==
Polling firm	Fieldwork date	Sample size	A	C	V	O	E	F	B	I	L	T	Æ	Others	Lead
Epinion	4 Sep - 13 Oct 2025	106	36.8	12.5	10.5	1.1	–	7.5	0.4	2.3	–	–	20.0	9.0	16.8
2024 european parliament election	9 Jun 2024		15.4	7.9	11.1	5.6	–	15.6	3.4	2.6	–	–	23.1	–	7.5
2022 general election	1 Nov 2022		29.8	6.7	9.6	2.6	–	6.0	1.6	3.6	–	–	18.1	–	11.7
2021 regional election	16 Nov 2021		13.0	14.1	46.6	3.1	–	6.2	4.8	0.3	–	–	–	–	32.5
2021 municipal election	16 Nov 2021		21.4 (4)	13.8 (3)	9.5 (1)	7.2 (1)	7.0 (1)	6.1 (1)	3.0 (0)	–	–	–	–	–	7.6
