= Birkholm (disambiguation) =

Birkholm may refer to:

Places

- Birkholm, Danish island close to Ærø south of Funen
- Birkholm, one of the islets of the Sluseholmen Canal District, in Copenhagen, Denmark

Buildings

- Birkholm, earlier name for Løvenborg, a manor house south of Holbæk, Denmark
- Birkholm Højskole, a folk high school located on Birkholm

People

- Jens Birkholm (1869–1915), Danish painter
- René Birkholm (born 1957), Danish comics artist
- Majbritt Birkholm (born 1981), Danish politician
