= 2021 Ærø municipal election =

← 2017	16 November 2021	2025 →

All 15 seats to the Ærø Municipal Council 8 seats needed for a majority
- Turnout: 4,035 (77.8%) ▼2.5pp
	First party	Second party	Third party
	A	P	C
Party	Social Democrats	Ærø Plus	Conservatives
Last election	4 seats, 23.3%	1 seat, 10.4%	3 seats, 17.5%
Seats won	4	3	3
Seat change	0	▲2	0
Popular vote	853	836	550
Percentage	21.4%	21.0%	13.8%
Swing	▼1.9%	▲10.6%	▼3.7%
	Fourth party	Fifth party	Sixth party
	Æ	V	O
Party	Ærøs Fremtid	Venstre	Danish People's Party
Last election	1 seat, 10.2%	3 seats, 16.8%	2 seats, 11.7%
Seats won	1	1	1
Seat change	0	▼2	▼1
Popular vote	435	378	288
Percentage	10.9%	9.5%	7.2%
Swing	▲0.7%	▼7.3%	▼4.5%
	Seventh party	Eighth party
	M	F
Party	Ærø i Centrum	Green Left
Last election	Did Not Stand	1 seat, 4,8%
Seats won	1	1
Seat change	▲1	0
Popular vote	279	244
Percentage	7.0%	6.1%
Swing	New	▲1.3%
Mayor before election
Ole Wej Petersen
Social Democrats
Mayor after election
Peter Hansted
Social Democrats

The first election following the 2007 municipal reform, led to the Conservatives winning the mayor's position. However they lost it after the 2013 election, where Jørgen Otto Jørgensen from the Social Democrats took over. In the previous election, Ole Wej Petersen from the Social Democrats had won the mayor's position, after Jørgen Otto Jørgensen didn't stand for re-election. Once again, the Social Democrats would stand with a new candidate. This would be Peter Hansted.

In the result, the Social Democrats would once again become the biggest party, with just 17 votes more than Ærø Plus, who came second. 8 of the 9 parties that stood to be elected, would win representation. Venstre would only win 9.5% of the vote, the second lowest of any municipality in the Funen constituency. Local parties would win 5 of the 15 seats, an increase of 3 compared to 2017. The traditional red bloc and the traditional blue bloc would win 5 seats each, and therefore there was no clear winner. This also meant that a traditional red or blue majority was not possible. In the end Peter Hansted would become the mayor, as a broad agreement between the Social Democrats, the Conservatives, the Green Left, Venstre and Ærø Plus was agreed on.

== Electoral system ==
For elections to Danish municipalities, a number varying from 9 to 31 are chosen to be elected to the municipal council. The seats are then allocated using the D'Hondt method and a closed list proportional representation. Ærø Municipality had 15 seats in 2021

Unlike in Danish General Elections, in elections to municipal councils, electoral alliances are allowed.

== Electoral alliances ==
=== Electoral Alliance 1 ===
Party		Political alignment
A	Social Democrats	Centre-left
F	Green Left	Centre-left to Left-wing

=== Electoral Alliance 2 ===
Party		Political alignment
B	Social Liberals	Centre to Centre-left
C	Conservatives	Centre-right

== Results by polling station ==
Division	A	B	C	F	M	O	P	V	Æ
Division	%	%	%	%	%	%	%	%	%
Marstal	13.9	2.2	20.0	3.3	8.4	14.0	28.7	5.0	4.5
Ærøskøbing	30.3	3.3	8.7	8.2	3.3	1.5	12.7	12.8	19.3
Søby	22.8	4.4	8.3	9.2	11.2	1.4	18.1	14.3	10.3

== Results ==
Party		Votes	%	+/-	Seats	+/-
Ærø Municipality
A	Social Democrats	853	21.43	-1.88	4	0
P	ÆrøPlus	836	21.00	New	3	New
C	Conservatives	550	13.82	-3.67	3	0
Æ	Ærøs Fremtid	435	10.93	+0.72	1	0
V	Venstre	378	9.50	-7.25	1	-2
O	Danish People's Party	288	7.23	-4.50	1	-1
M	Ærø i Centrum	279	7.01	New	1	New
F	Green Left	244	6.13	+1.36	1	0
B	Social Liberals	118	2.96	New	0	New
Total		3,981	100	N/A	15	N/A
Invalid votes		21	0.40	-0.30		
Blank votes		33	0.64	-0.08		
Turnout		4,035	77.79	-2.49		
Source: valg.dk
