= Marstal Municipality =

Former municipality in Denmark

Coordinates: 54°51′20″N 10°30′49″E

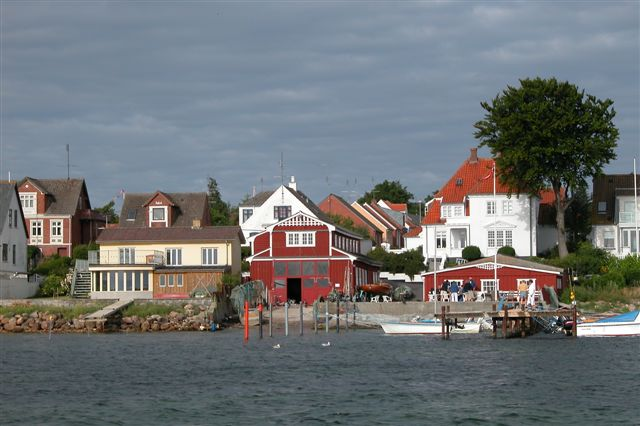
Marstal

Marstal municipality, is a former municipality (Danish, kommune) in Funen County on the island of Ærø in southern Denmark. Since 1 January 2006 it has been part of Ærø municipality. Its territory included the islands of Birkholm and Halmø, and covered an area of 17 km^{2}. In 2005, it had a total population of 3,208. Its last mayor was Karsten Landro, a member of the Conservative People's Party (Det Konservative Folkeparti) political party.

Its main town and site of its municipal council was the town of Marstal.

Marstal municipality was the smallest municipality in Funen County. It was located on the eastern portion of the island of Ærø, plus on a number of small islands to the north. Neighboring municipalities were the former Ærøskøbing to the west, and Sydlangeland on the island of Langeland to the east, albeit separated from the municipality by the waters of Marstal Bay (Marstal Bugt), the Little Belt, and the Baltic Sea.

Ferry service connects Marstal with the town of Rudkøbing on the island of Langeland.

On 1 January 2006 Marstal municipality ceased to exist as the result of Kommunalreformen ("The Municipal Reform" of 2007), and merged with Ærøskøbing municipality forming a new Ærø municipality. The result was a municipality with an area of 91 km^{2} and a total population of 6,939 (2005). The new municipality belonged to Funen County (in 2006) and is part of the new Region of Southern Denmark from January 1, 2007.
