= Ellen (E-ferry) =

Danish ship

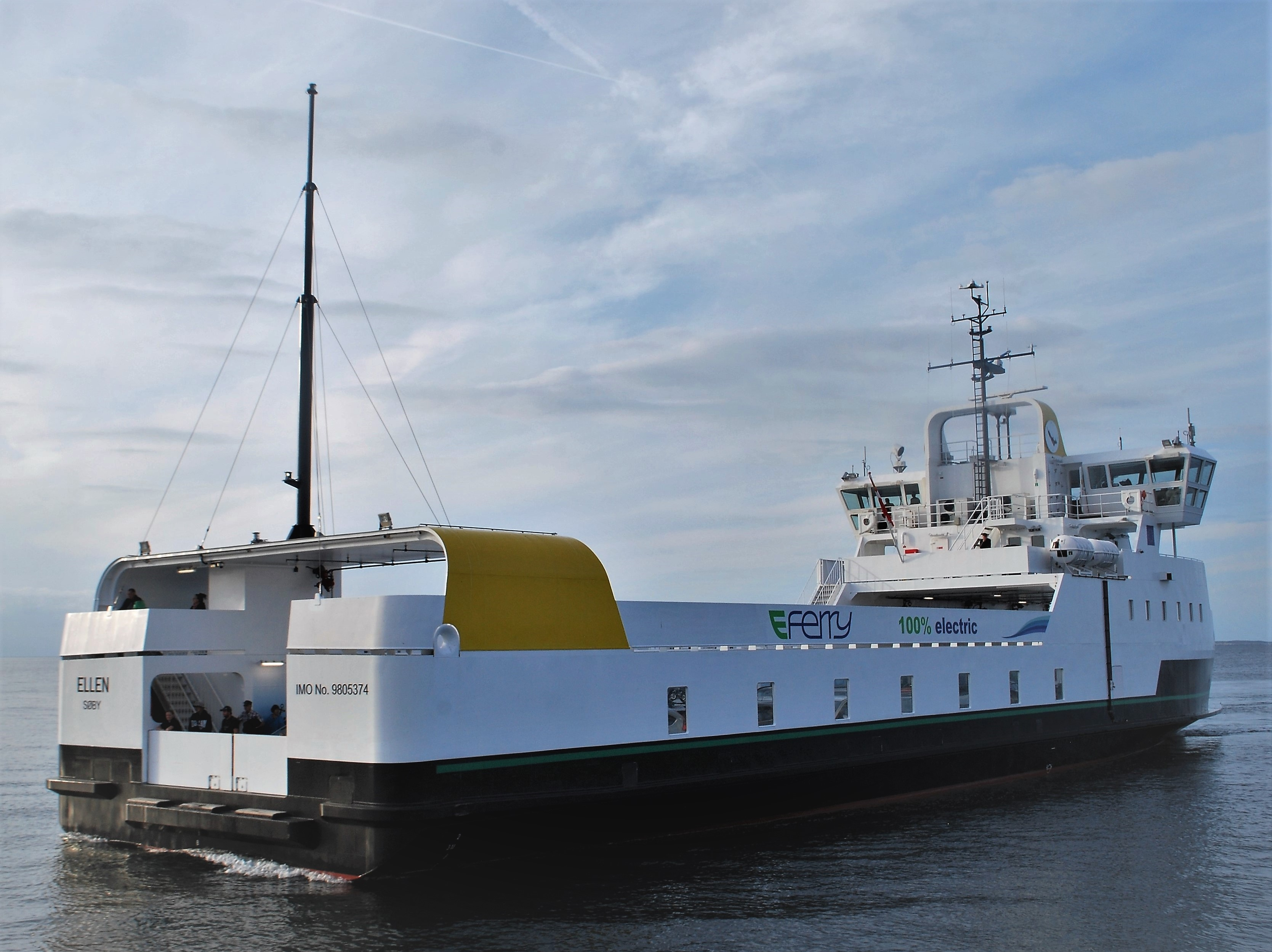
- in August 2019

History

Denmark
- Name: Ellen
- Operator: Ærø Municipality (Ærø Kommune)
- Port of registry: Søby
- Route: Søby - Fynshav, Søby - Faaborg
- Builder: Søby Værft A/S (assembly at Szczecin Shipyard, Szczecin, Poland)
- Cost: EUR 21.3 million
- Christened: 1 June 2019
- Maiden voyage: August 2019
- Identification: IMO number: 9805374; MMSI number: 219023531; Callsign: OWJQ
- Status: in service

General characteristics
- Class & type: Electric Ro-Ro Passenger ferry
- Tonnage: Gross tonnage: 996 GT
- Length: 59.4 m (195 ft)
- Beam: 13.4 m (44 ft 0 in)
- Decks: 4 (superstructure)
- Installed power: 4.3 MWh battery system (Li-NMC)
- Propulsion: 2x 750kW propulsion motors and 2x 250kW thruster motors by Danfoss Editron
- Speed: 12.1 knots (13.9 mph; 22.4 km/h)
- Capacity: 198 passengers, 31 cars
- Crew: 3

E-ferry Ellen (Danish: Elfærgen Ellen) is a pioneering electric car ferry. She operates the 22-nautical-mile (41 km) route between the islands of Ærø and Als in Southern Denmark.

== History ==
Ellen was developed from E-Ferry, an EU-backed project costing EUR 21.3 million. Although this is around 40% more expensive than a conventional vessel, operating costs are 75% lower. It is expected that she will save the release of 2,000 tonnes of CO_{2} per year.

The ferry was built by Søby Værft A/S, with sections fabricated in Szczecin, Poland. In September 2016, 22 sections were welded together and the hull was towed to Søby on Ærø for outfitting.

== Project evaluation ==
The E-ferry project ended successfully in June 2020, with Ellen in service. Evaluation of the project shows

- 85% energy efficiency (grid-to-propeller)
- 1600 kWh consumption (per roundtrip of 22 nautical miles; approx. 40 km)
- 4–8 years before higher investment cost turns into savings from lower operational costs
- 2,520 tonnes/year CO_{2} emissions saved (compared to a modern diesel ferry; using electricity produced on Ærøby from clean renewable sources; 2,010 tonnes if powered from the standard Danish grid mix)
- CO_{2} emissions from battery production estimated 215-430 tonnes (three months emissions from the best modern diesel ferry)

== Layout ==
Ellen can carry 30 vehicles and 200 passengers. She was designed to minimise weight. Her passenger areas are on the same level as the open car deck. She has no ramps, instead using those on shore. The hull is steel but the bridge is made of aluminum. Deck furniture is made from recycled paper rather than wood, giving the ferry a total weight of 650 tonnes.

Ellen's batteries were developed by Leclanché of Switzerland and are reported to be Lithium Nickel Manganese Cobalt Oxide. They are split between two battery rooms below deck and have a capacity of 4.3 MWh, larger than any other electric vessel at its time. She is one of the first such vessels to have no emergency generator. A charging arm on the shore ramp moves with the tide and allows battery recharging while loading. Charging time is about 20 minutes.

== Service ==
Ellen was built to operate the 22 nautical miles between the coastal city of Fynshav and port city of Søby (Ærø) on the island of Ærø in Southern Denmark. She replaced MF Skjoldnæs from 15 August 2019.

== Gallery ==
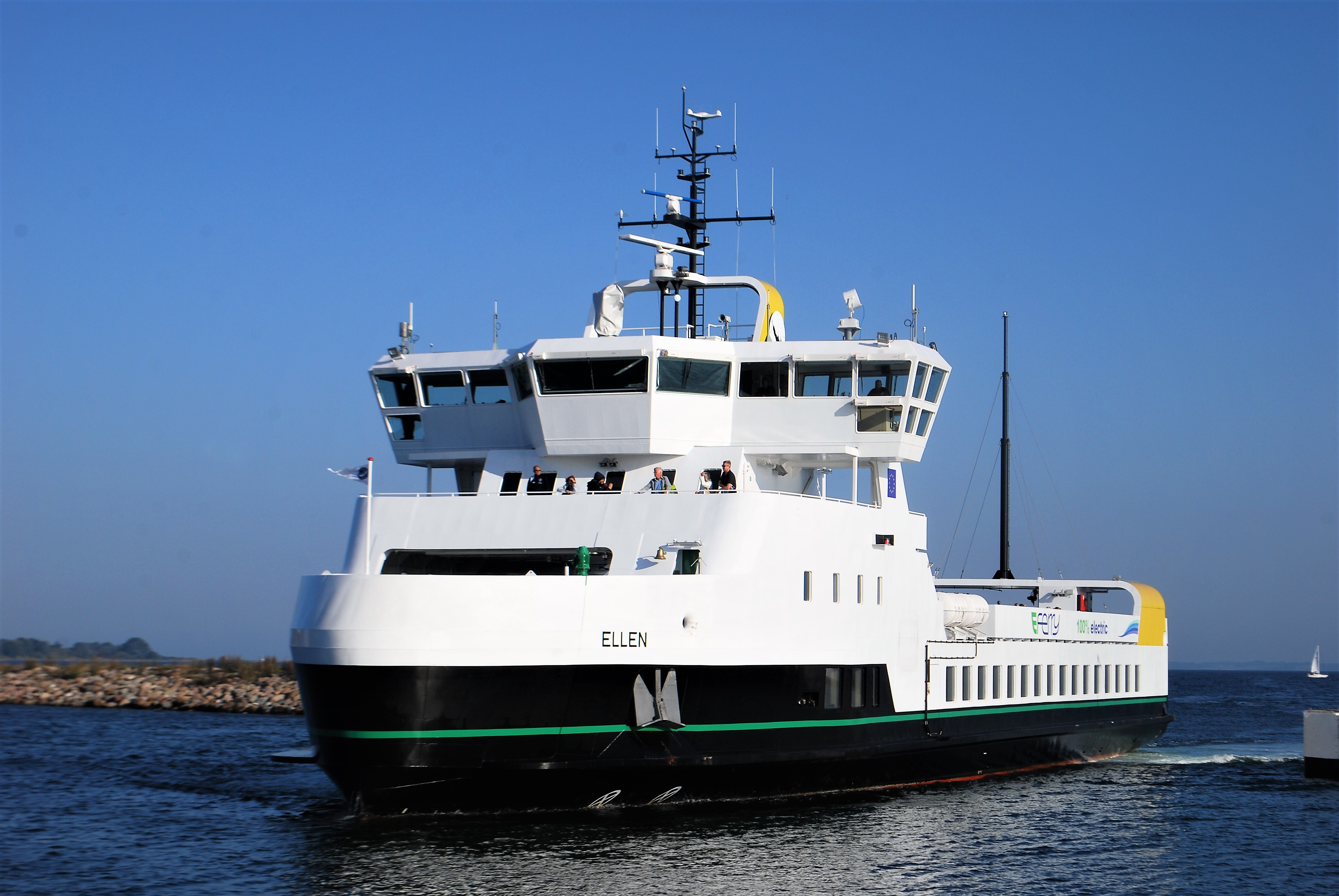
E-ferry Ellen

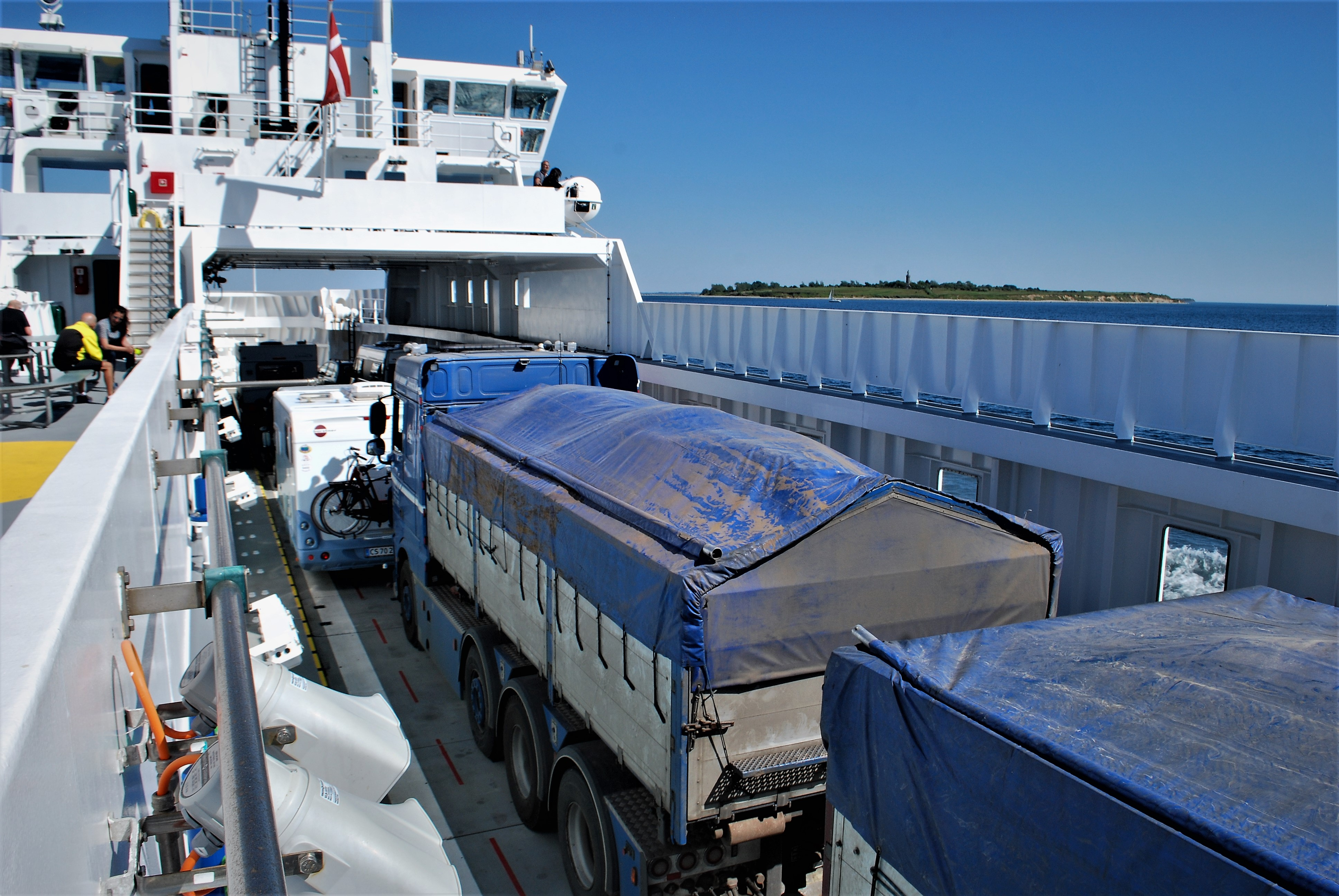
E-ferry Ellen

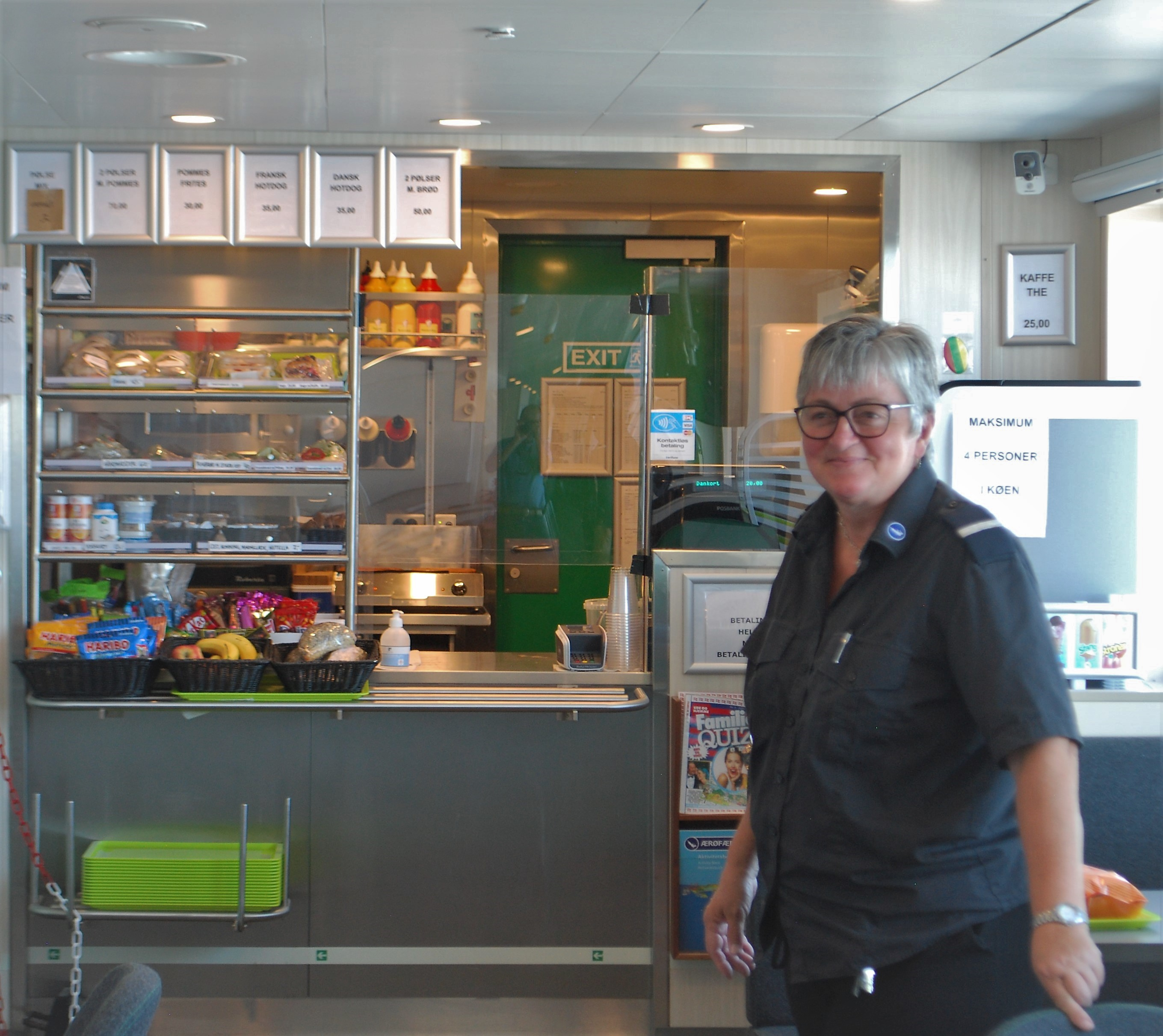
Café

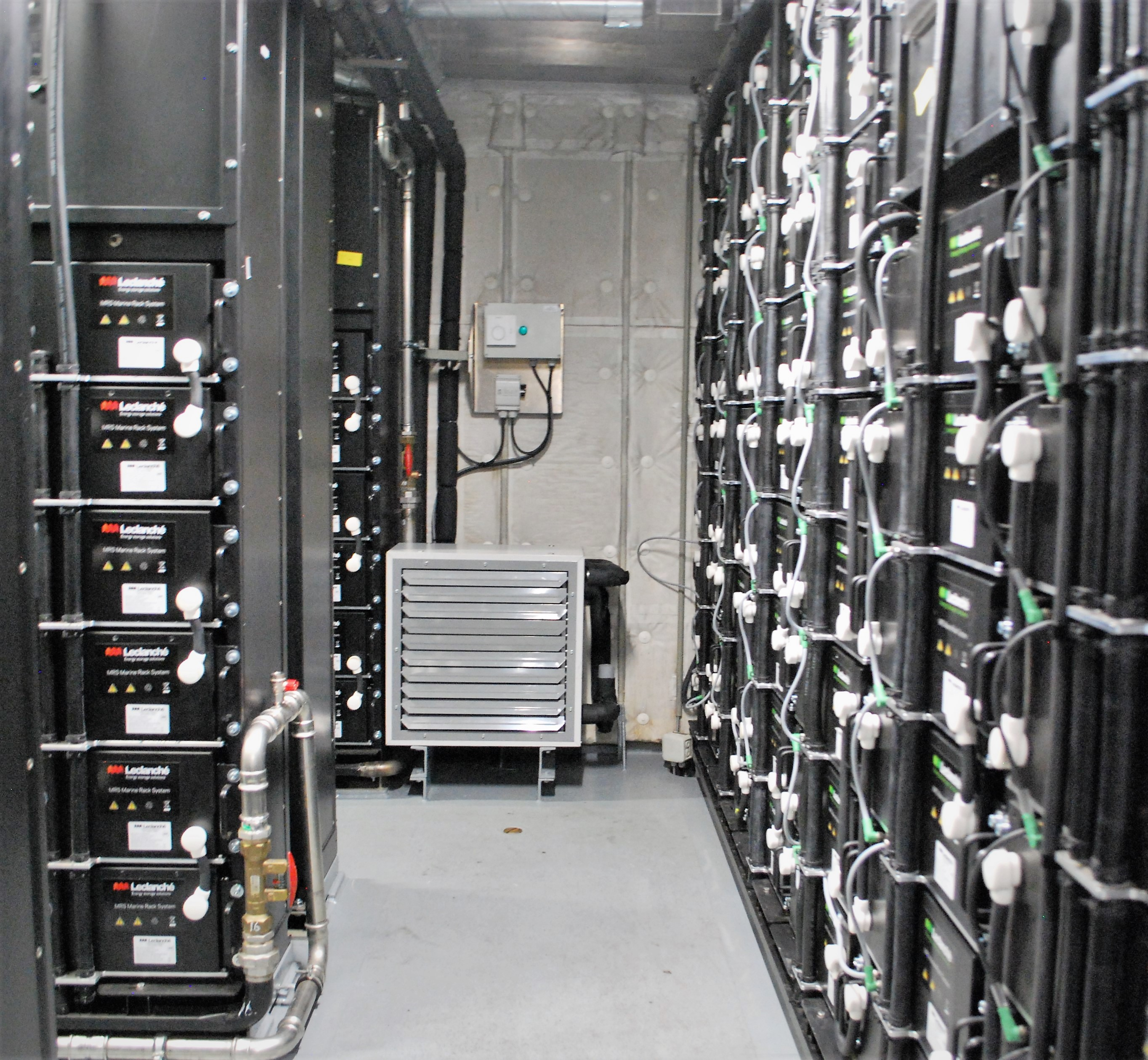
4.3 MWh battery system

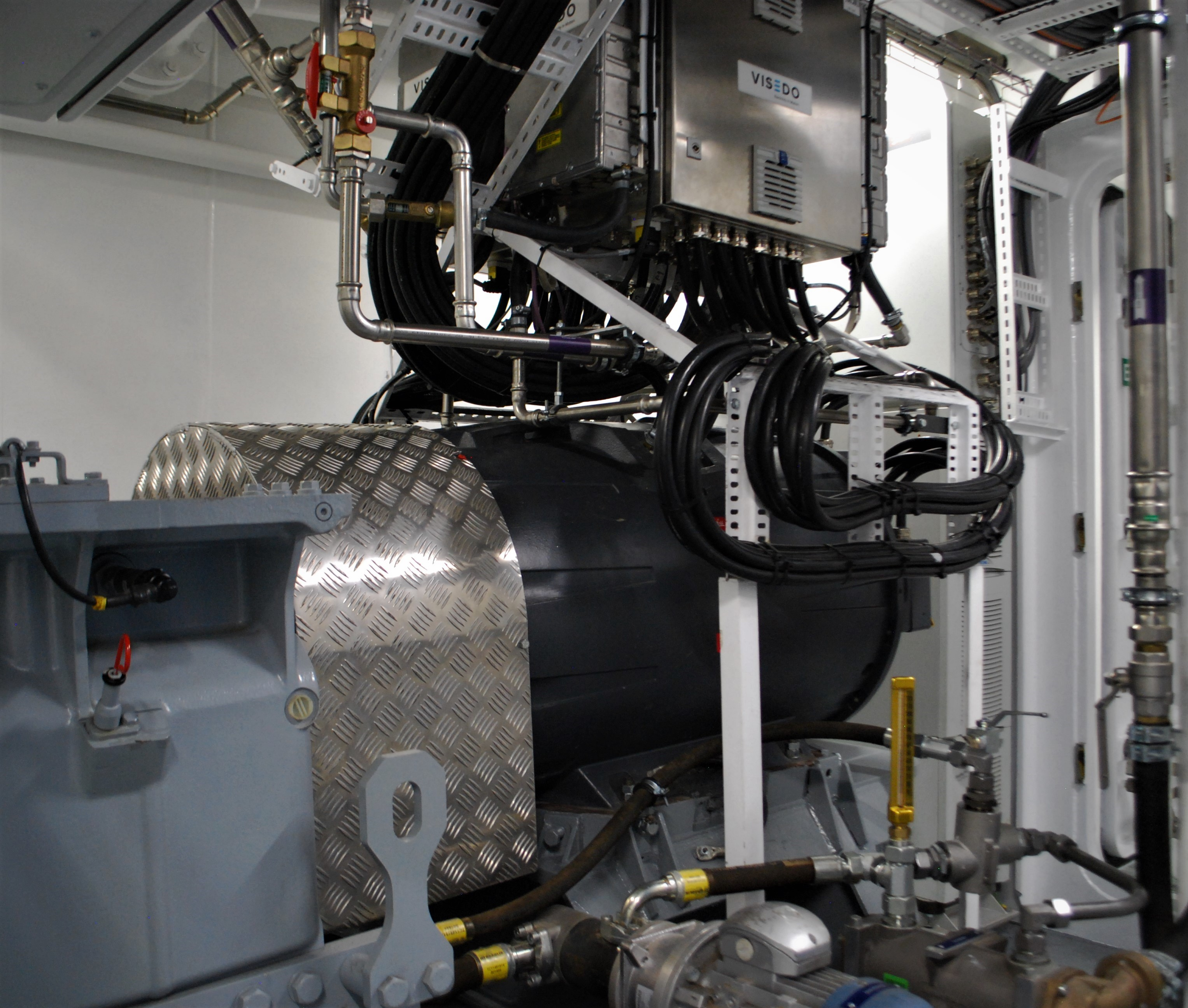
Electric motor

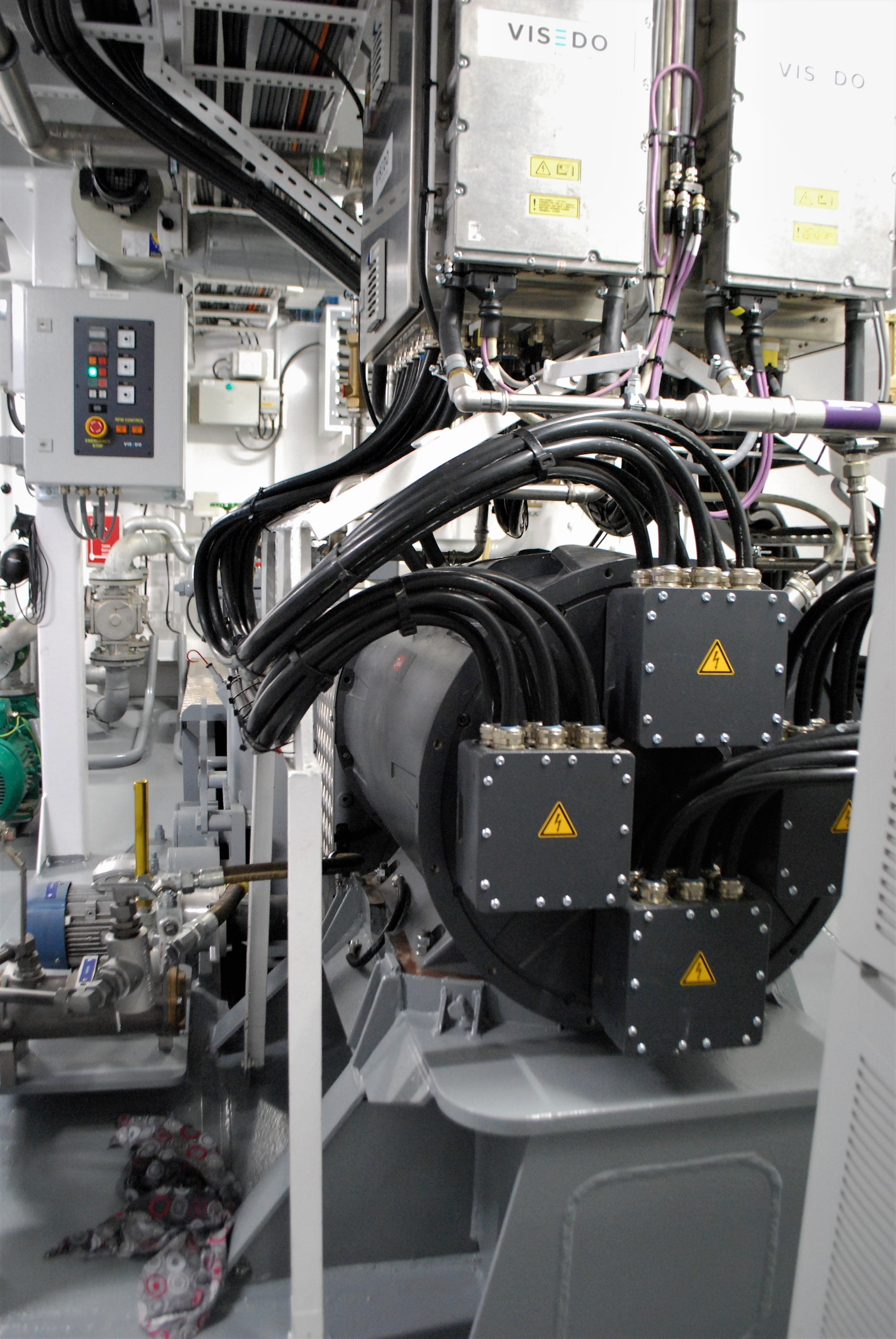
Electric motor

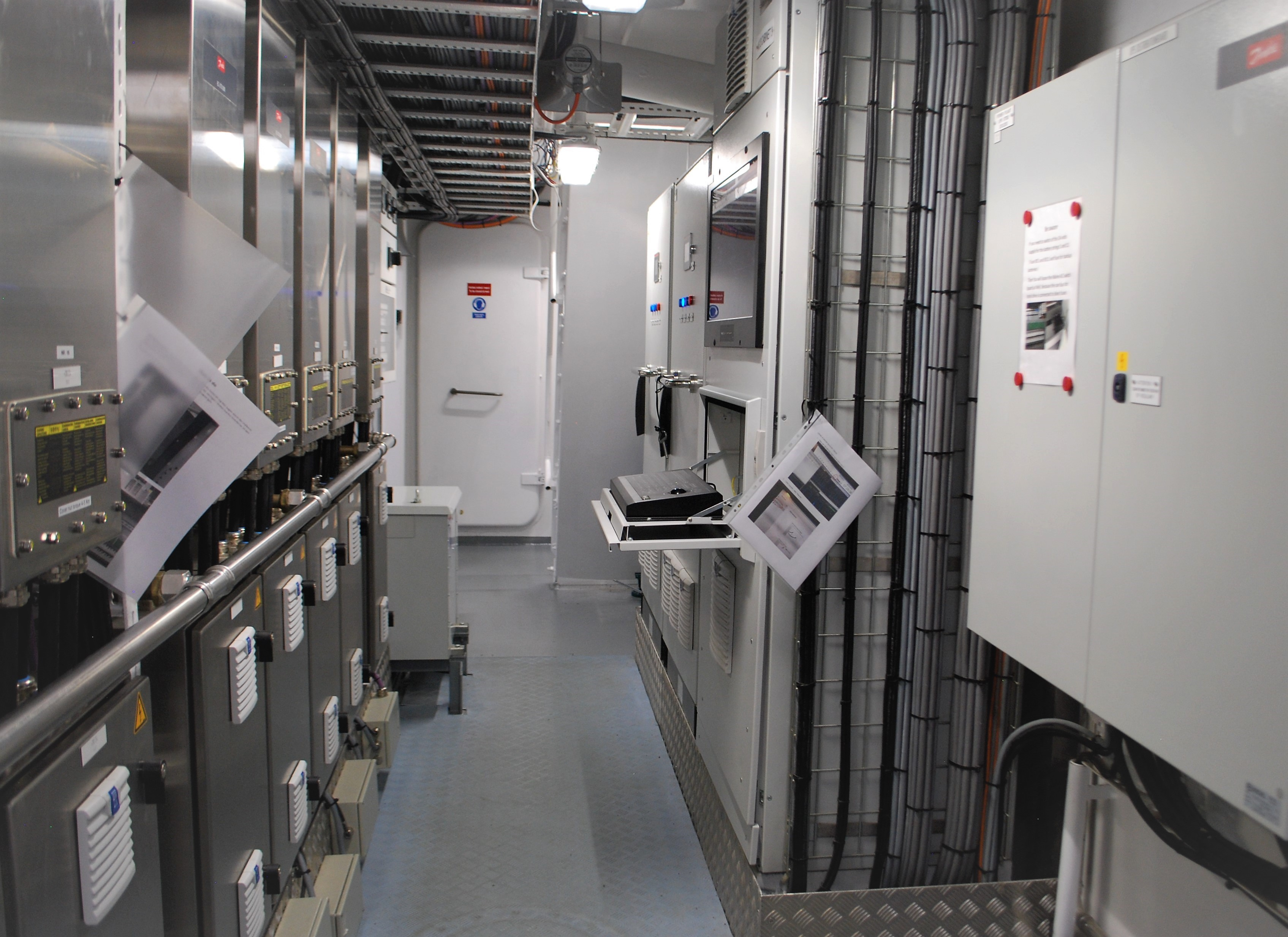
Technical control room
