= Søby Parish, Ærø Municipality =

Parish in Ærø Municipality, Denmark

Søby Parish Søby Sogn
- Parish
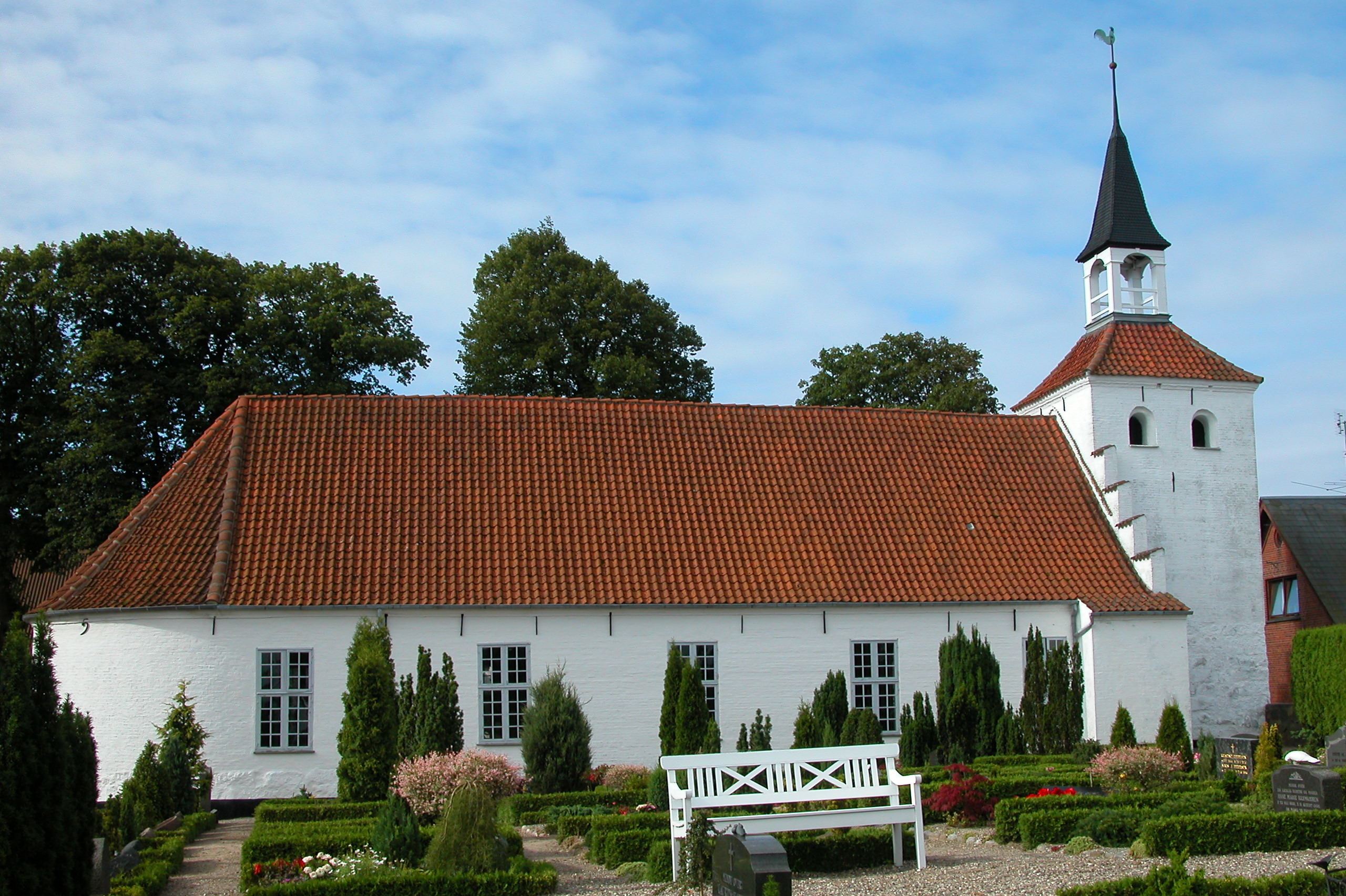
- Søby Church

- The parish within Ærø Municipality
- Coordinates: 54.9386°N 10.2568°E
- Country: Denmark
- Region: Southern Denmark
- Municipality: Ærø Municipality
- Diocese: Funen

Population (2025)
  - Total: 585
- Parish number: 7718

Søby Parish (Danish: Søby Sogn) is a parish in the Diocese of Funen in Ærø Municipality, Denmark. The parish contains the town of Søby.
