= Ærøskøbing Municipality =

Coordinates: 54°53′22″N 10°24′11″E

Ærøskøbing Municipality Ærøskøbing Kommune
- Former Municipality
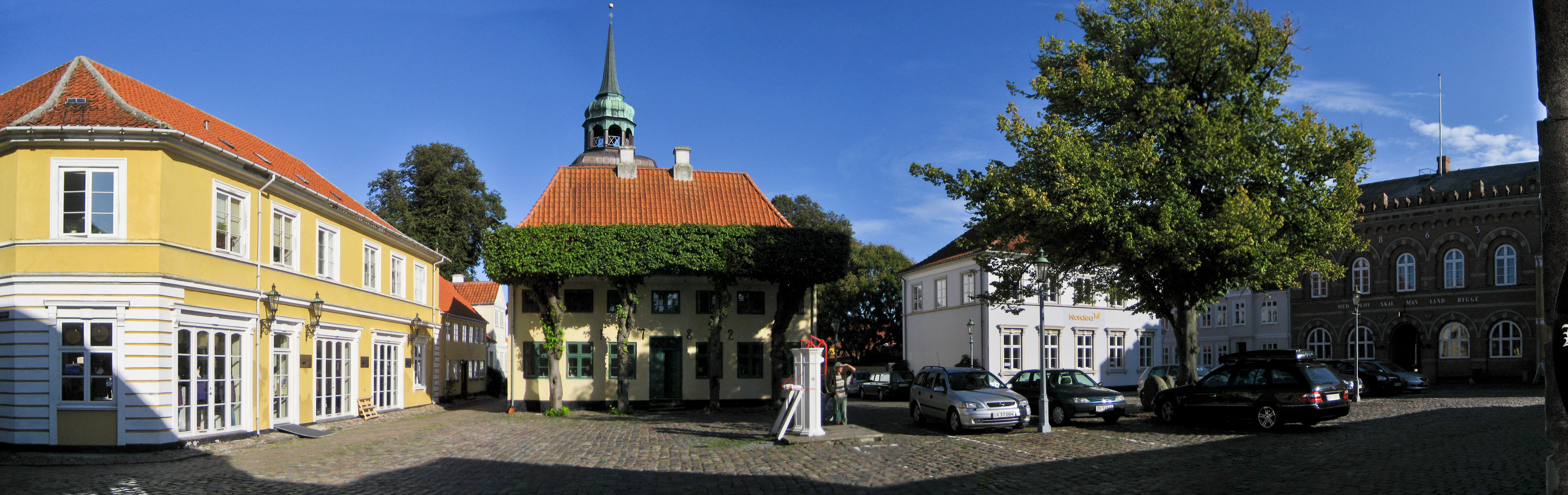
- Former municipal building in Ærøskøbing

- Coat of arms
- Interactive map of Ærøskøbing Municipality
- Country: Denmark
- County: Funen County
- Established: 1970
- Disestablishment: 2005

Area
  - Total: 72.31 km^{2} (27.92 sq mi)

Population (2005)
  - Total: 3,731

Ærøskøbing Municipality (Danish: Ærøskøbing Kommune, pronounced [ˈeːˌʁøˀsˌkʰøˀpe̝ŋ kʰoˈmuːnə]) is a former municipality of Funen County on the island of Ærø. The municipality was formed in 1970 and disestablished in 2006 when it was integrated into Ærø Municipality.

The municipality was located on the western portion of the island of Ærø. Its neighboring municipality Marstal occupied the eastern portion of the island. To the north and west are the waters of the Little Belt. To the south is the Baltic Sea, and to the southeast are the waters of Marstal Bay (Marstal Bugt).

== History ==
Before the municipality was established, the administrative region was originally named West-Æro Municipality (Danish:Vest-Æro Kommune), and . Following the 1970 Danish Municipal Reform, it was given its official name.

The municipality covered an area of 74 km^{2}, and had a total population of 3,731 (2005). The town of Ærøskøbing served as the seat of its municipal council.

On 1 January 2006 Ærøskøbing Municipality ceased to exist as the result of Kommunalreformen ("The Municipal Reform" of 2007), when Ærøskøbing merged with Marstal municipality and formed the new Ærø municipality. The result was a municipality with an area of 91 km^{2} and a total population of 6,939 (2005). The new municipality became part of the Region of Southern Denmark.

Its last mayor, Jørgen Otto Jørgensen, was a member of the Social Democrats party. He became the mayor of the newly formed Ærø municipality, an office he held twice, from 2006 until 2010 and again from 2014 to 2017.

== Mayors ==
- Helge J. Hansen, 1970–1981
- Kasper Caspersen, 1982–1985
- Jens Groth–Lauritsen, 1986–1997
- Jørgen Otto Jørgensen, 1998–2005
