= Ommel =

- Village
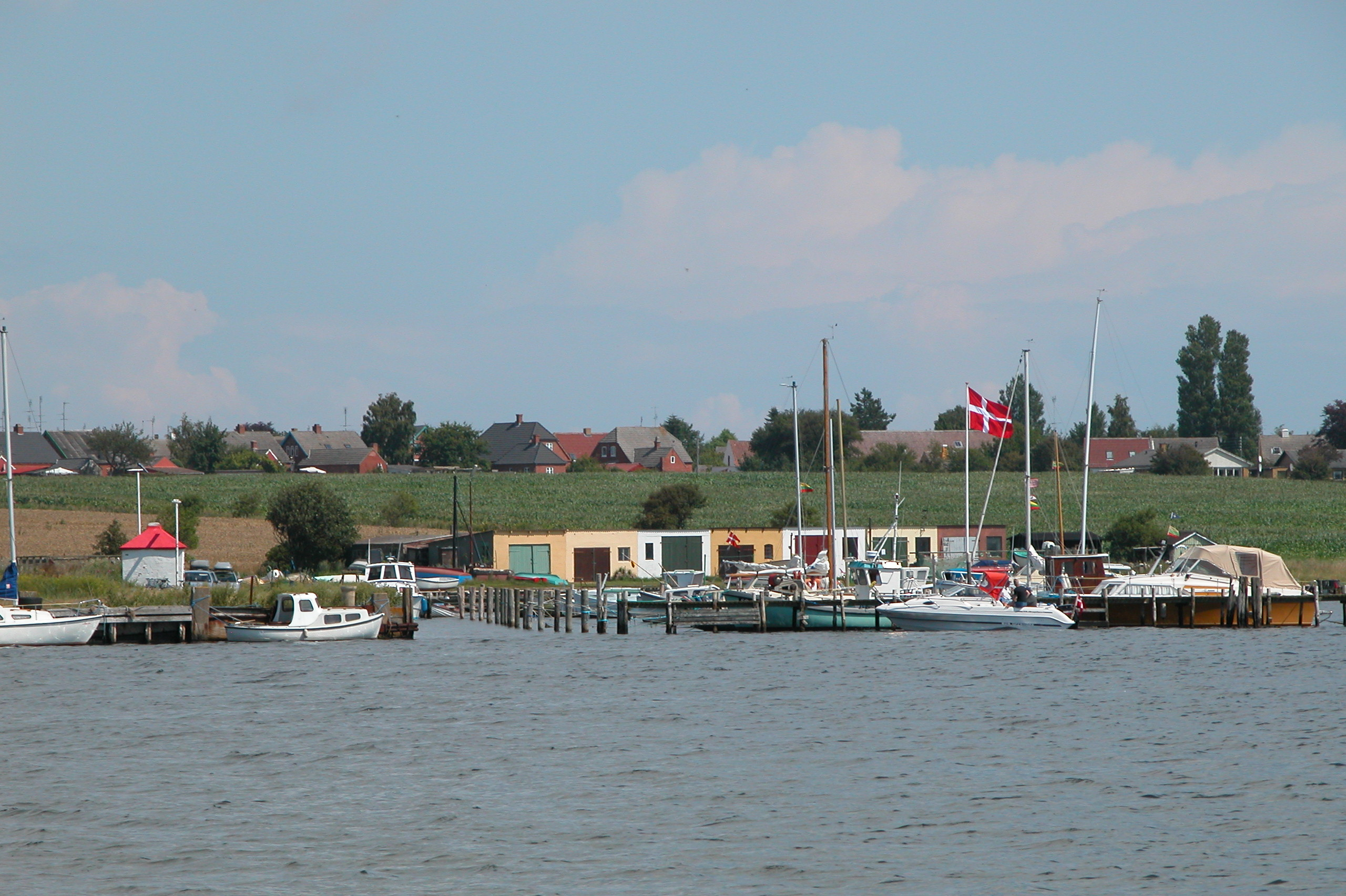

- Location in Denmark
- Coordinates: 54°52′21″N 10°29′14″E
- Country: Denmark
- Region: Region of Southern Denmark
- Municipality: Ærø municipality

Population (2026)
  - Total: 251
- Time zone: UTC+1 (CET)
  - Summer (DST): UTC+2 (CEST)

Ommel is a village on the Danish island of Ærø. The village has a population of 251 (1 January 2026).
