= Halmø =

Island in Denmark

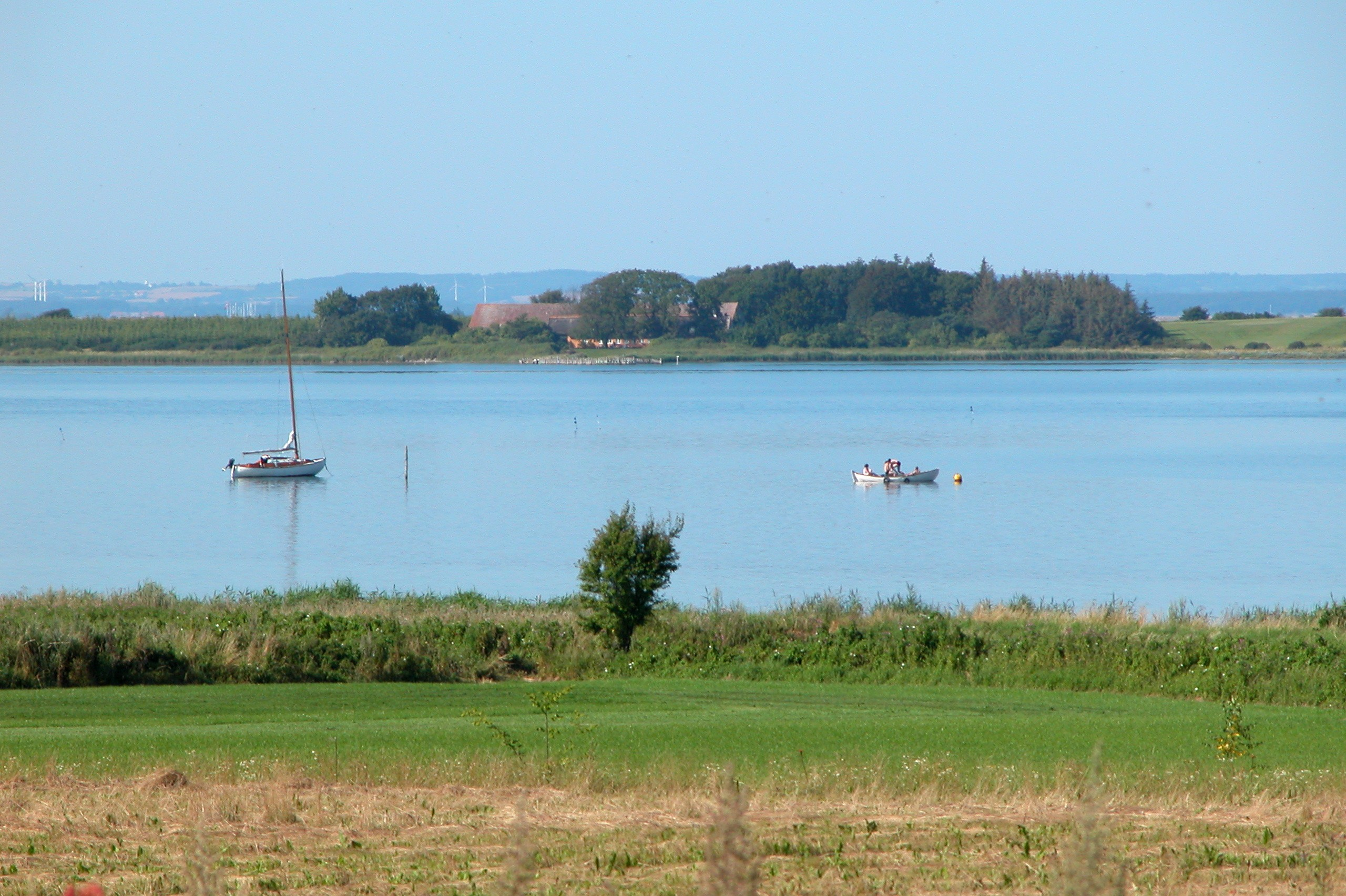
- Halmø seen from Ommel

- Location within Region of Southern Denmark

Geography
- Coordinates: 54°53′18″N 10°29′42″E
- Archipelago: South Funen Archipelago
- Area: 0.5 km^{2} (0.19 sq mi)

Administration
- Denmark
- Region: Region of Southern Denmark
- Municipality: Ærø Municipality

Halmø is a small private uninhabited Danish island in the South Funen Archipelago, lying 4 km northeast of Marstal. The island is 2 km long, and about 350 meters wide.
