= Fynshav =

- Town
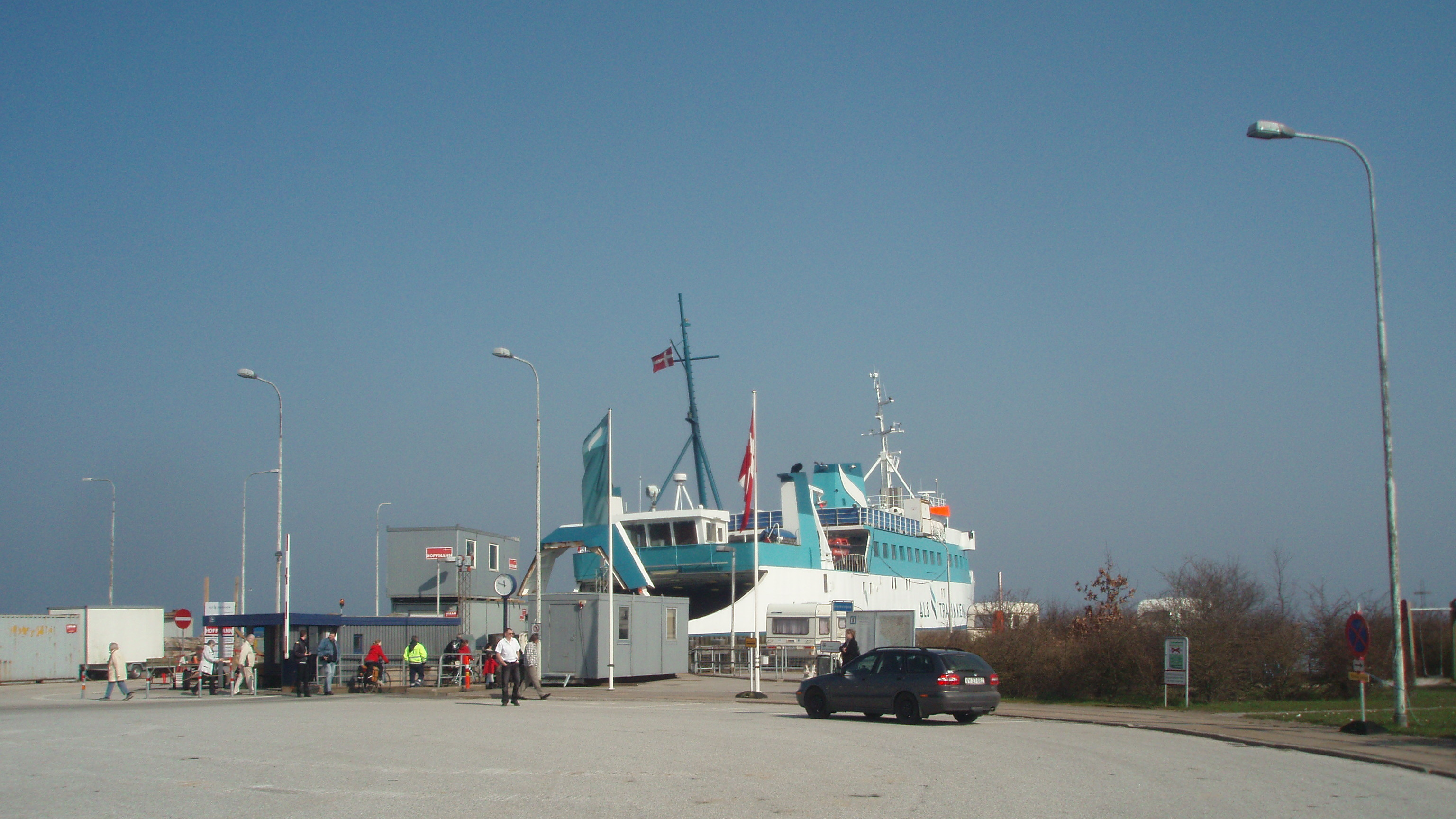
- The ferryterminal in Fynshav

- Location within Region of Southern Denmark Location within Denmark
- Coordinates: 54°59′10″N 9°58′53″E
- Country: Denmark
- Region: Southern Denmark
- Municipality: Sønderborg

Population (2026)
  - Total: 793

Fynshav (German: Fühnenshaff) is a small coastal town and ferry port, with a population of 793 (1 January 2026), in Sønderborg Municipality, Region of Southern Denmark in Denmark.

Fynshav is located on the east coast of the island of Als 17 km northeast of Sønderborg.

Fynshav has ferry connections to Bøjden on the island Funen and to Søby on the island of Ærø. The Fynshav–Bøjden route is operated by Molslinjen under the brandname Alslinjen and the Fynshav–Søby route is operated by Ærø Ferry.

Fynshav Boat Harbour is a small marina located south of the ferry port.
