= Birkholm =

Island in Denmark

Coordinates: 54°55′50″N 10°30′0″E

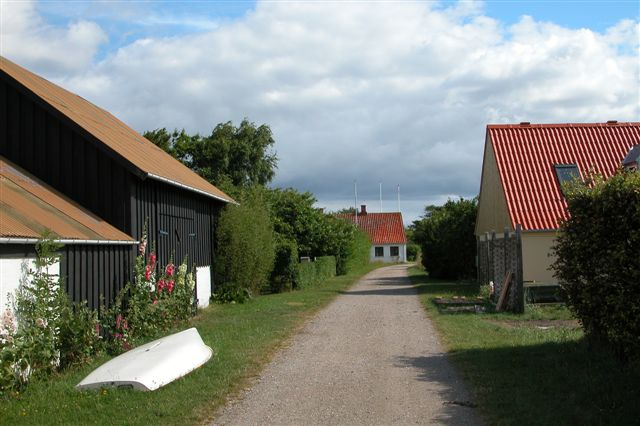
- Houses on Birkholm

Geography
- Location: Baltic Sea
- Area: 0.92 km^{2} (0.36 sq mi)

Administration
- Denmark
- Region: South Denmark Region
- Municipality: Ærø Municipality

Demographics
- Population: 10 (2010)
- Pop. density: 10.9/km^{2} (28.2/sq mi)

Birkholm is a small Danish island off the southern coast of Funen in Ærø Municipality. With an area of just 0.9 km^{2} (0.3 sq mi), as of 1 January 2010 it has a population of 10. The flat, low-lying island is just over 2 km (1 mi) long and 2 metres (6 ft 7 in) above sea level at its highest point, though the protective dykes are 2.8 metres (9 ft 2 in) high. It can be reached by post boat from Marstal on Ærø in 25 minutes.

== History ==
Birkholm is first mentioned in King Valdemar's census book in 1231. At the time, the woody, unpopulated island served as a royal hunting ground. The first inhabitants probably arrived in the 13th century.

Agriculture used to be the main occupation on Birkholm, although there was also fishing. In 1870, there were 89 people living there. The village had a school (until 1976) and a grocer.

In 1872 and 1874, the island was flooded during storms, the only dry spot being Hylsbanken. There was yet another disaster in 1876 when all but two of the houses burnt down.

== Birkholm today ==
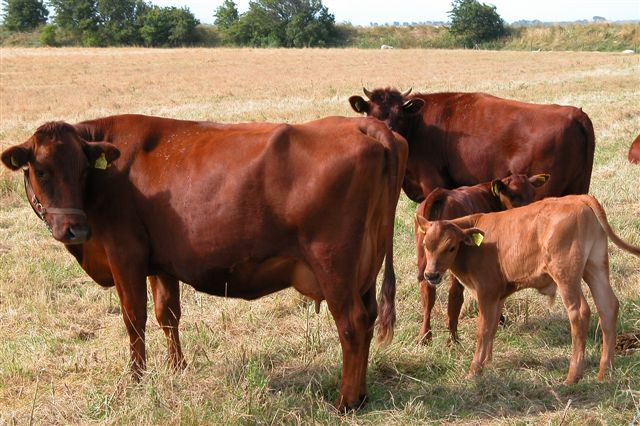
Cattle grazing on Birkholm

Agricultural activity on the island ceased in the 1990s. The fields were unattended although sheep and cattle continued to graze there. Thorn bushes and wild roses spread everywhere. However, since 2003 the situation has improved as the inhabitants have started to take control. In 2004, a cattle barge was put into service by the authorities, allowing cattle to be moved to the islands for grazing during the summer. Most of the houses on the island are now used for holiday rentals, some all the year round. Those still living on Birkholm all the year round appear to have formed their own independent community.

== Notable people ==
- Kim Aabech, (born 1983 in Birkholm) is a Danish footballer

== See also ==
- List of islands of Denmark
