= Søby (Ærø) =

Port town in Denmark

- Town
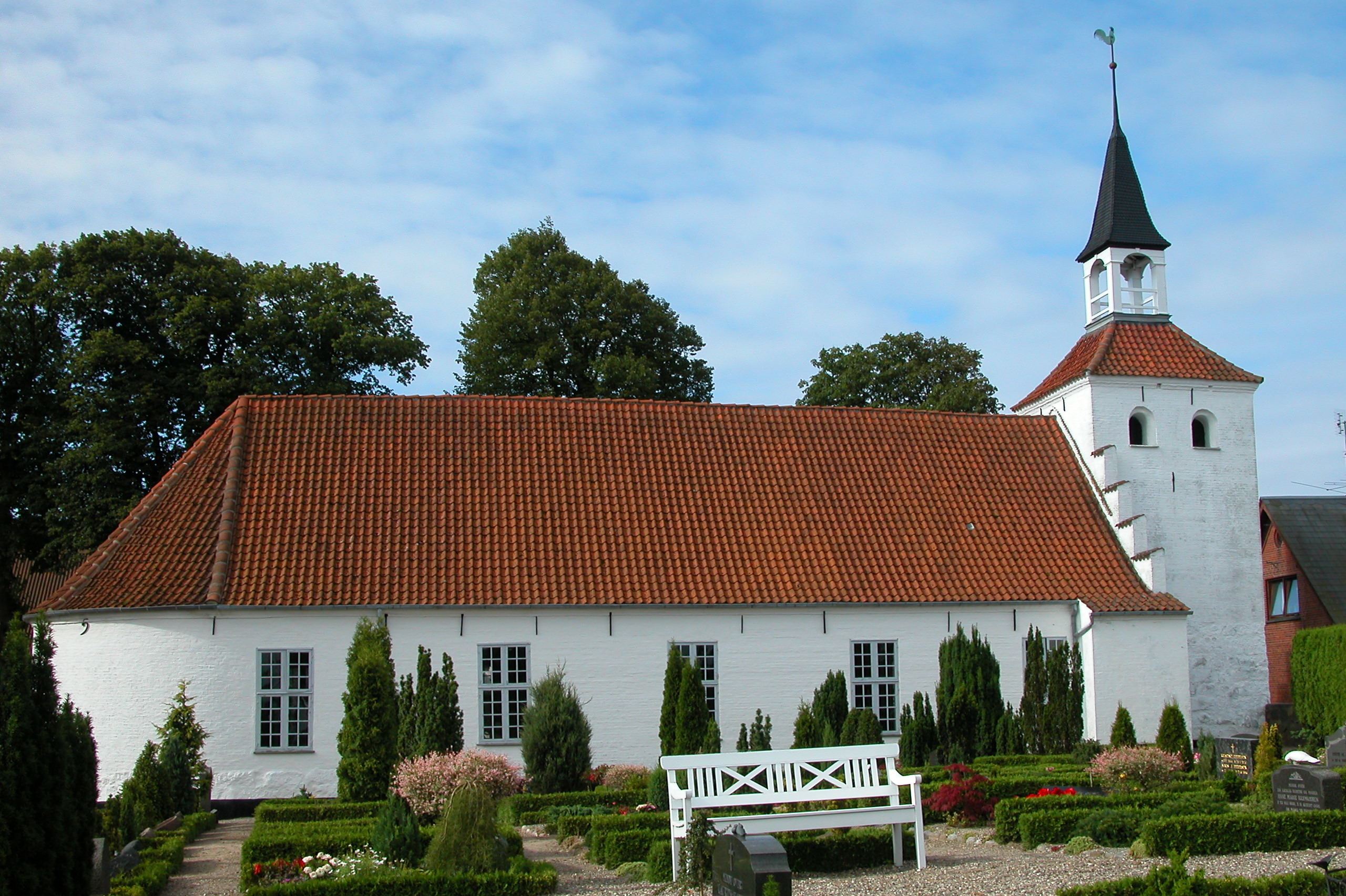
- Søby Church

- Location in Denmark Søby (Region of Southern Denmark)
- Coordinates: 54°56′22.7″N 10°15′22.2″E
- Country: Denmark
- Region: Southern Denmark
- Municipality: Ærø Municipality
- Parish: Søby Parish

Population (2026)
  - Urban: 422
- Time zone: UTC+1 (CET)
  - Summer (DST): UTC+2 (CEST)
- Postal code: DK-5985 Søby

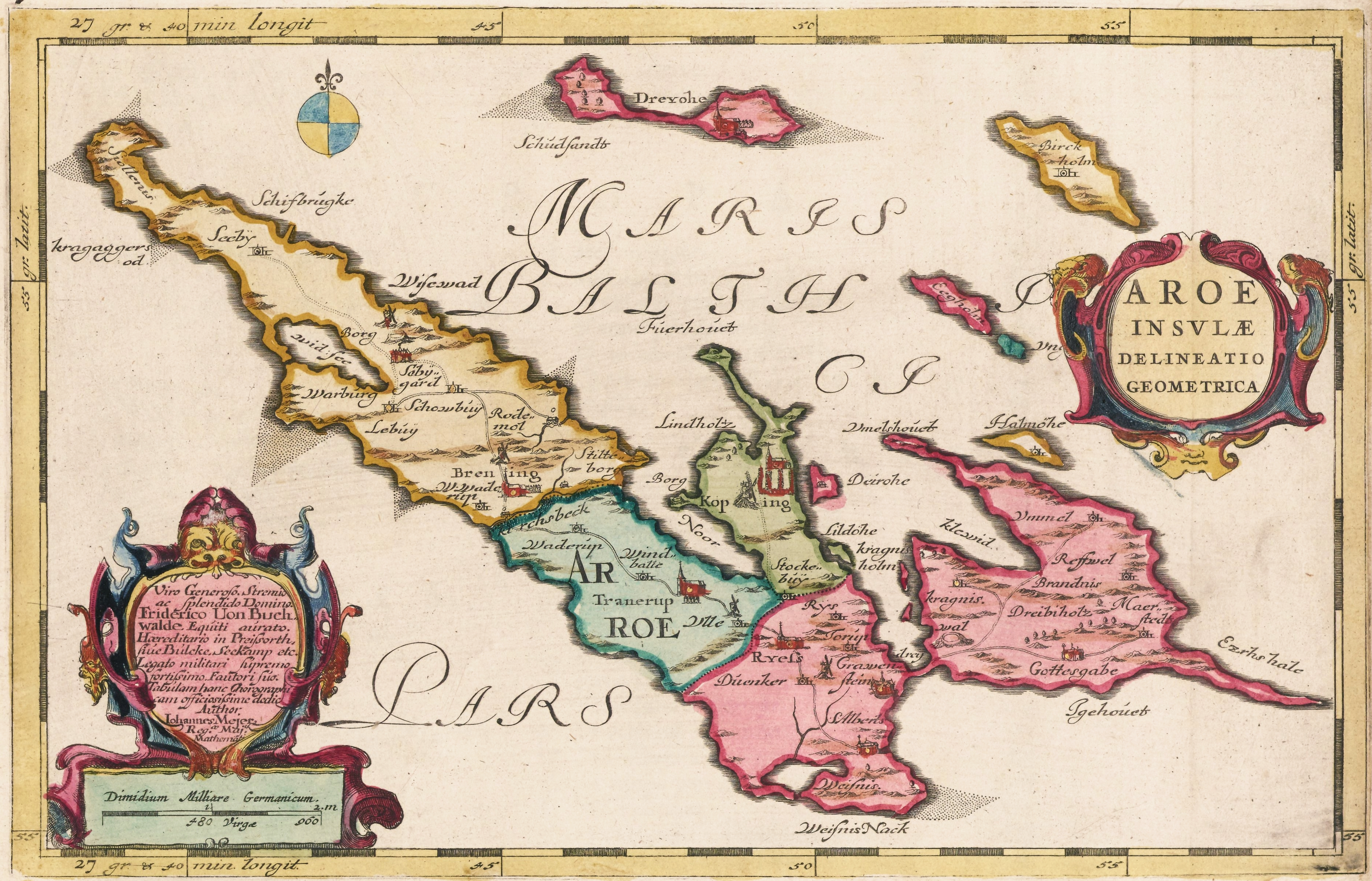
Map of Ærø, circa 1665.

Søby is a port town at the northernmost tip of the southern Danish island of Ærø, 15 km from Ærøskøbing and 23 km from Marstal. Like the rest of the island, it is politically part of Ærø Municipality. Søby has an active shipyard, fishing industry and business port.

== Etymology ==
The name means lake (sæ) village (the suffix -by meaning settlement).

== History ==
Søby is first mentioned in references as Seboy in 1277 when it was in the possession of the Brandenburgers. The medieval castle, of which just the raised earthworks remain, passed into the hands of Duke Hans the Younger of Schleswig-Holstein-Sønderborg for whom the great manor-farm of Søbygård was built from 1580, even though it was rarely used as a residence by the dukes.

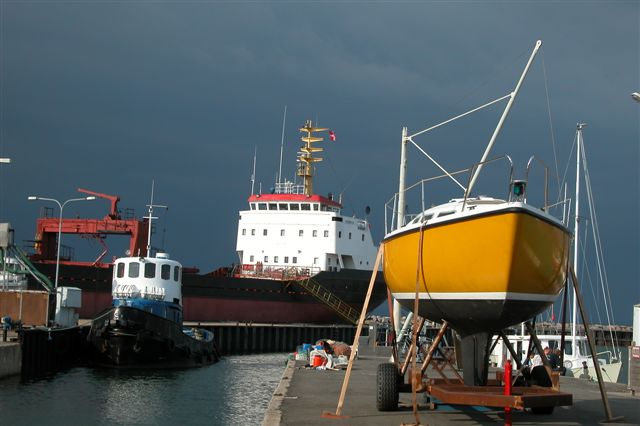
Søby Harbour.

The manor had only a few scattered farmsteads up until the 1720s but once Søbygård Estate was subdivided, and the farm enlarged into a manor house (1729), regional settlement grew with sailors and fishermen. Søby Church was consecrated in 1745. During the Gunboat War of 1807 to 1814, fortifications were built in at Næbbet, southeast of Skjoldnæs Fyr, but in Søby itself the port remained little more than a primitive pile bridge where the ferry to Als could dock. This changed in 1865 when the area's skippers jointly built a stone pier with a bulwark.

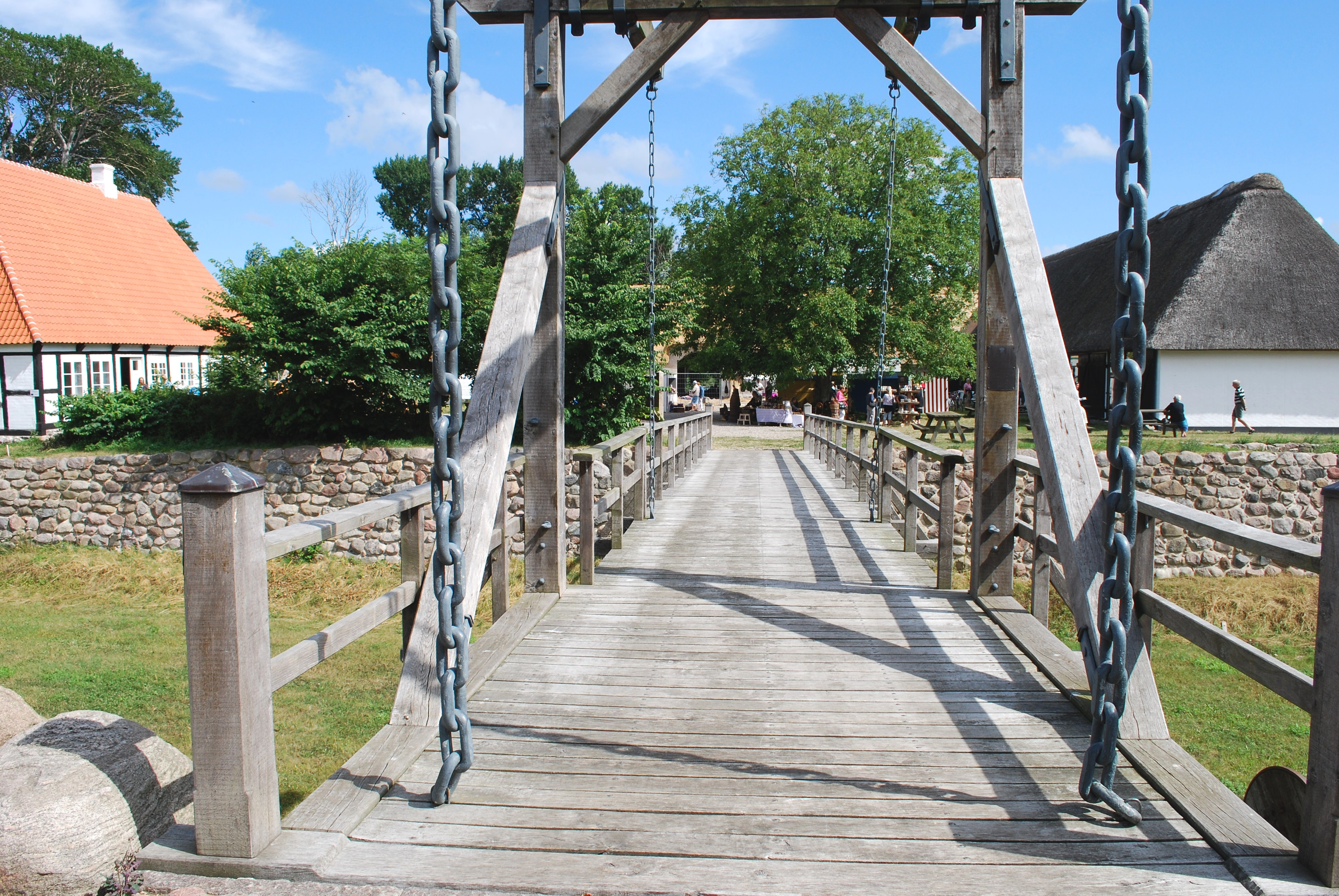
Søbygård Manor

The steamship connection to Faaborg started in 1903, the port was further deepened in 1924, and in 1933 a fully improved ferry berth was built. Two years earlier, Arthur Christian Jørgensen had established a workshop specializing in the repair and improvement of small ship engines, developing into a full shipyard in 1950 with around 30 men employed to build fishing boats. The first dry dock opened in 1967 with a much bigger version inaugurated in 2006. This is big enough to build ferries and naval ships of up to 7000 tons.

== The Port ==
Today Søby Port can receive ships with a maximum length of 135m and a draft of 6.5m and its shipyard, Søby Værft, is the island of Ærø's biggest single employer (around 140). A big redevelopment involving some 290,000 m² of the port area is scheduled to start in 2022 for completion in the summer of 2024.

== Attractions ==
- Søbygård Manor is now a history museum and concert space with access to the earthworks of the older fortified farm area.
- Skjoldnæs Fyr is a 22m-high lighthouse built of granite in 1881 by Swedish stonemasons. It's 5 km from the port. En route is a golf course.
- Vitsø Mill is a Dutch-style windmill 2 km southwest of the port. Installed in 1958, it is the only one of its kind in Denmark.

== Transport ==
There are ferry connections to Fynshav on Als and to Faaborg on Funen. The Fynshav route is operated since 15 August 2019 by the world's biggest electrically powered ferry, the environmentally friendly E-ferry Ellen which was itself built in the shipyard here by Søby Værft.

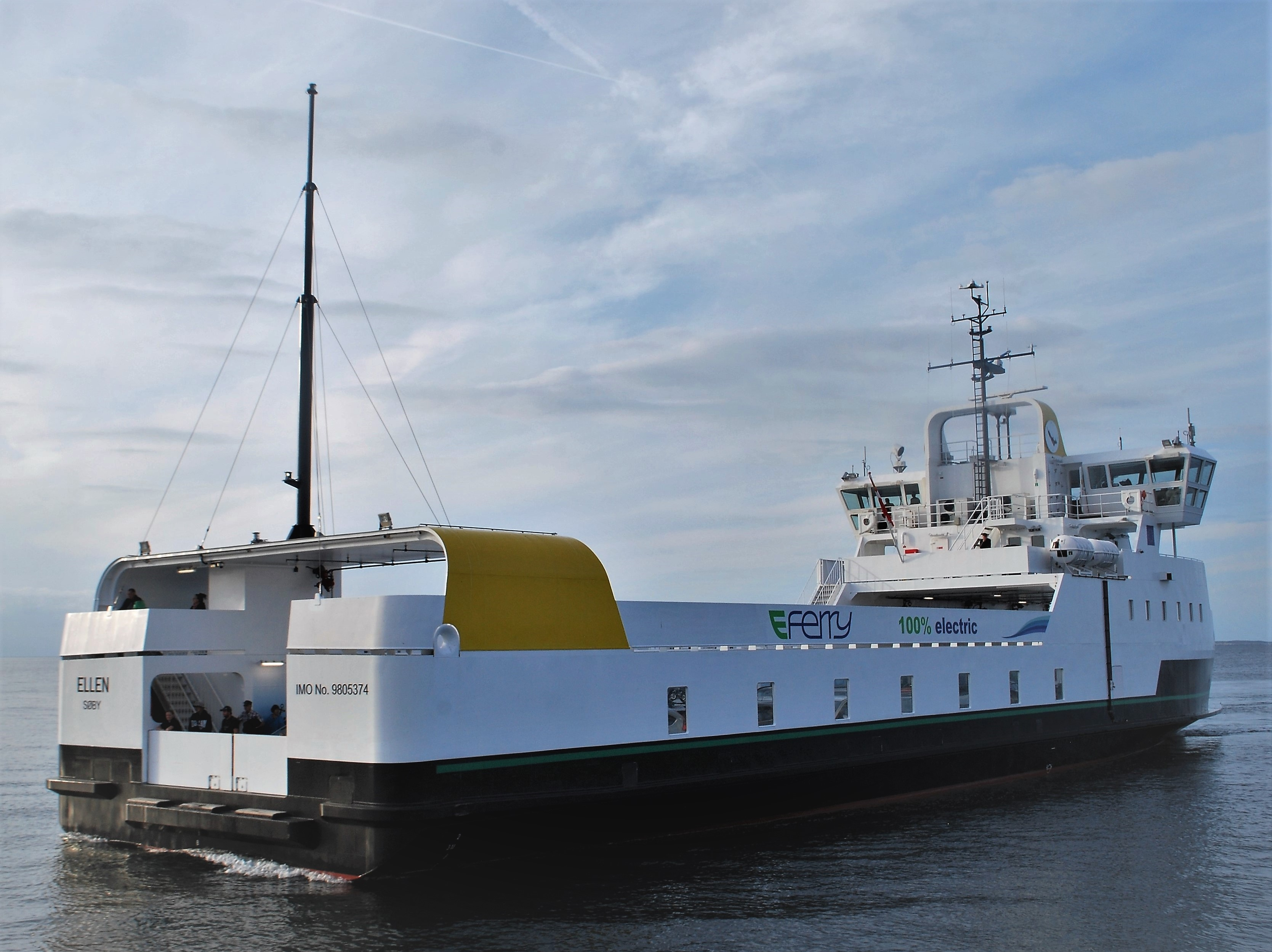
The 2019 E-ferry Ellen.
