= Ærø Municipality =

Ærø Municipality Ærø Kommune (Danish)
- Municipality
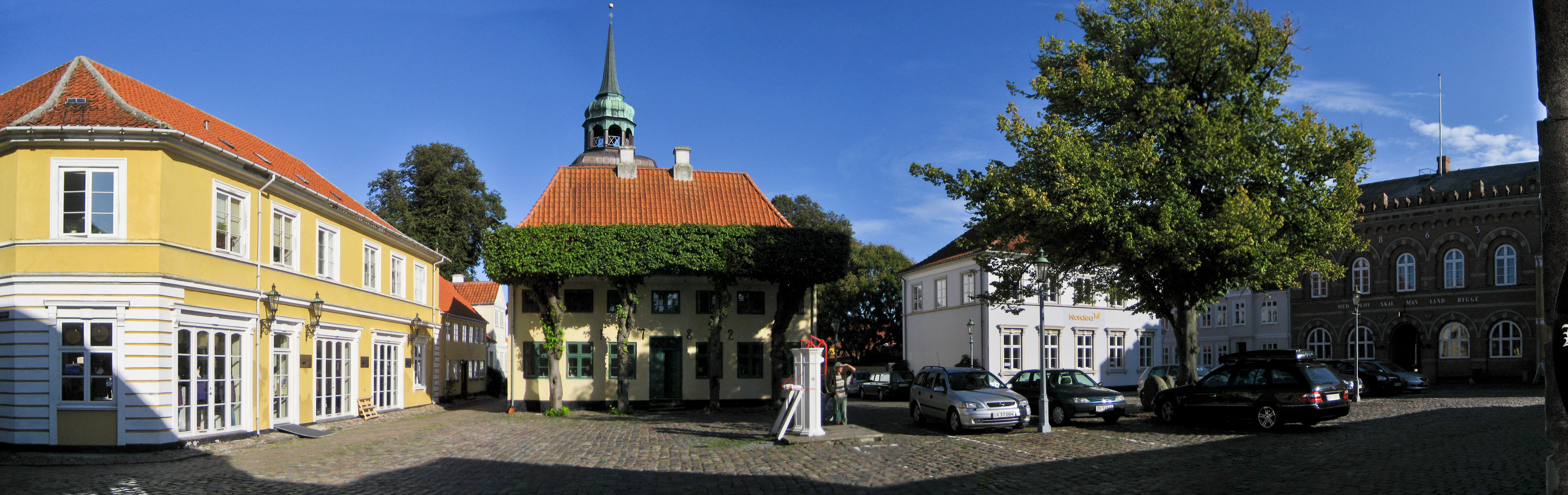

- Flag Coat of arms

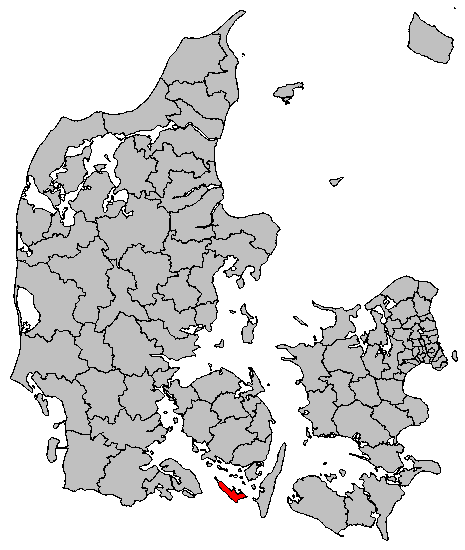
- Coordinates: 54°53′00″N 10°20′00″E
- Country: Denmark
- Region: Southern Denmark
- Founded: 1 January 2006

Government
  - Mayor: Peter Hansted

Area
  - Total: 91 km^{2} (35 sq mi)

Population (1 January 2026)
  - Total: 5,766
  - Density: 63/km^{2} (160/sq mi)
- Time zone: UTC1 (CET)
  - Summer (DST): UTC2 (CEST)
- Postal code: 5970
- Website: aeroekommune.dk

Ærø Municipality (Danish: Ærø Kommune) is a kommune occupying the 88 km^{2} island of Ærø in Denmark in the Region of Southern Denmark as of 1 January 2007, and before 2007 in Funen County. The municipality also encompasses Birkholm and the uninhabited islands Lilleø, Dejrø and Halmø.

The first mayor of Ærø (2006–09;2014–17) was Jørgen Otto Jørgensen (born 21 December 1950, Marstal) a member of the Social Democrats (Socialdemokraterne) political party, until 2005 mayor of Ærøskøbing Municipality. As of 1 January 2022 the mayor is Peter Hansted (born 12 January 1956, Lyngby) representing the Social Democrats. The most populous town is Marstal and the seat of the municipal council is Ærøskøbing.

The municipality was created 1 January 2006 as a result of the municipal reform of 2007 (approved by the lawmakers of the Folketing 16 June 2005 with elections for the new municipal and regional board members in the 98 municipalities and 5 regions taking place 15 November 2005, once every 4 years), through a merger of Marstal and Ærøskøbing municipalities. However, the new municipality nonetheless agreed to enter into a "municipal cooperation agreement" with Svendborg Municipality.

The Danish municipal reform was implemented Monday 1 January 2007, but politicians on Ærø were given permission to unify the island one year ahead of the rest of the municipalities that were merged as a result of the reform. From 1 January 2006 until 31 December 2006 Ærø Municipality belonged to Funen County.

The result is a municipality with an area of 91 km^{2} and a population today of 5,766 (1 January 2026). In January 1985 8,429 people lived on the area of the present municipality, and in January 2006 6,873 people. The new municipality belonged to Funen County in 2006 and became part of the new Region of Southern Denmark on 1 January 2007.

== Locations ==
Cities and villages in Ærø Municipality
Name	Population (2024)
Marstal	2,077
Ærøskøbing	913
Søby	435
Ommel	266

== Politics ==
Ærø's municipal council consists of 15 members, elected every four years.

=== Municipal council ===
Below are the municipal councils elected since the Municipal Reform of 2007.

Election	Party										Total seats	Turnout	Elected mayor
Election	A	C	F	L	O	P	V	Æ	Æ	Æ	Total seats	Turnout	Elected mayor
2005	5	5		2			2	1			15	80.8%	Jørgen Otto Jørgensen (A)
2009	3	4	1	4			3				15	80.5%	Karsten Landro (C)
2013	5	3			2	1	2		2		15	81.3%	Jørgen Otto Jørgensen (A)
2017	4	3	1		2	1	3		1		15	80.3%	Ole Wej Petersen (A)
2021	4	3	1		1	3	1		1	1	15	77.8%	Peter Hansted (A)
Data from Kmdvalg.dk 2005, 2009, 2013 and 2017
