= Ærø =

Danish Baltic Sea island

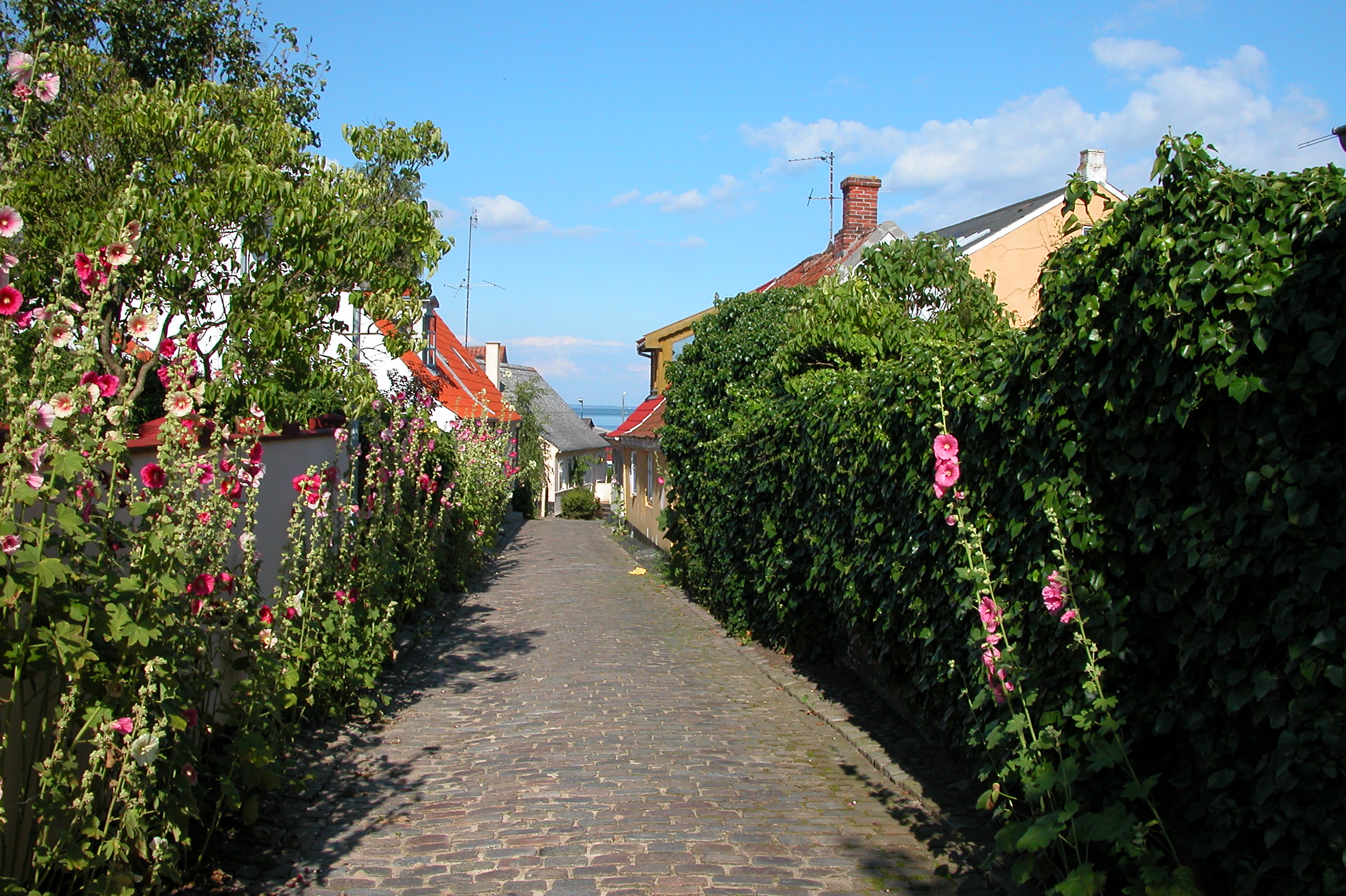
- Marstal, largest town on the island

Geography
- Location: Baltic Sea
- Coordinates: 54°53′N 10°20′E
- Area: 88 km^{2} (34 sq mi)

Administration
- Denmark
- Region: South Denmark Region
- Municipality: Ærø Municipality
- Largest settlement: Marstal (pop. 2,111)

Demographics
- Population: 5,956 (2020)
- Pop. density: 67/km^{2} (174/sq mi)

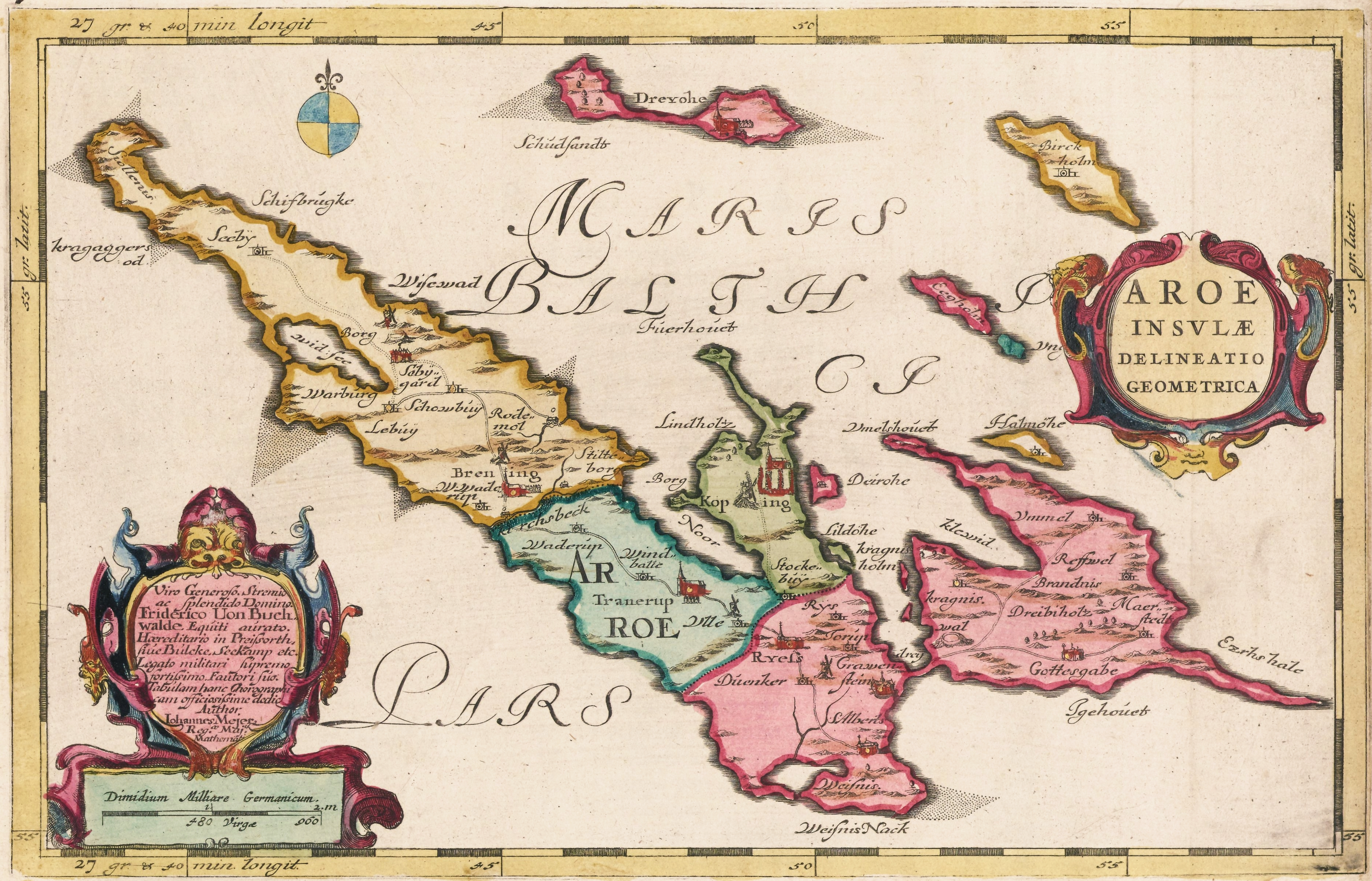
Map of 1665

Ærø (Danish pronunciation: [ˈeːˌʁøˀ]) is one of the Danish Baltic Sea islands, and part of the Southern Denmark Region.

Since 1 January 2006 all of Ærø has constituted a single municipality, known as Ærø Kommune. Before that date, there were two municipalities on the island: Ærøskøbing Kommune in the west and Marstal Kommune in the east. This merger was part of a reform of the public sector with the laws being effective as of 26 June 2005. This merger was allowed to happen one year before the other municipalities merged as there had already been an island-wide referendum with a majority of voters for the merger.

In a 2010 survey, readers of the Danish newspaper Kristeligt Dagblad voted Ærø as Denmark's third most wonderful island, behind only Fur and Læsø.

== Geography ==
- Population (in 2020): 5,956 (island of Ærø only); 5,964 (municipality).
- Area: 88 km^{2} (island); 91 km^{2} (municipality)
- Length of coastline: 167 km (104 mi)

Ærø measures roughly 20 km from northwest to southeast and varies in width from around 4 to 8 km. There are three small towns on the island in 2020: the largest is Marstal with a population of 2,111. Ærøskøbing has 942 inhabitants and Søby 438. Fourteen villages and a number of farms complete the island's pattern of settlement.

Ærøskøbing, with its narrow lanes and picturesque 18th-century houses was historically Ærø's chief town, and remains the primary port for ferry connections. Marstal, also known as the "skipper village", from its being the home of so many sailors and captains, is the island's largest town today and is its principal commercial and shopping centre.

The countryside is for the most part gently undulating, and there is a several-kilometre-long stretch of 33-metre-high cliffs at Voderup Klint on the west coast. With its generally low traffic density, Ærø is a popular destination for hikers and cyclists. The island's beaches also attract anglers and artists. As one of the islands making up the South Funen Archipelago, Ærø is favoured by particularly fine weather. It enjoys a higher number of sunshine hours than the average for the rest of Denmark, and the year-round temperature is also a few degrees above the national average.

At Olde Mølle, at one of Ærø's highest points and near the centre of the island, the sculptor Erik Brandt has created a "peace bench", conceived with the intention of providing people with an opportunity to survey the island and its surrounding sea, whilst pondering on the theme of world peace.

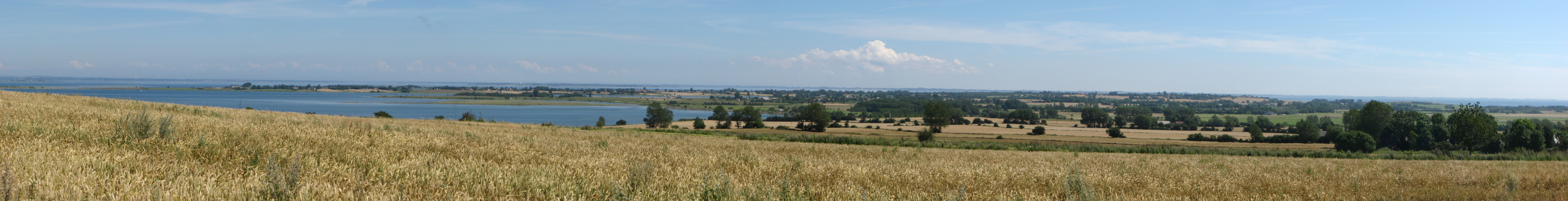
A view of the southeastern part of the island

== History ==
The flag of Ærø

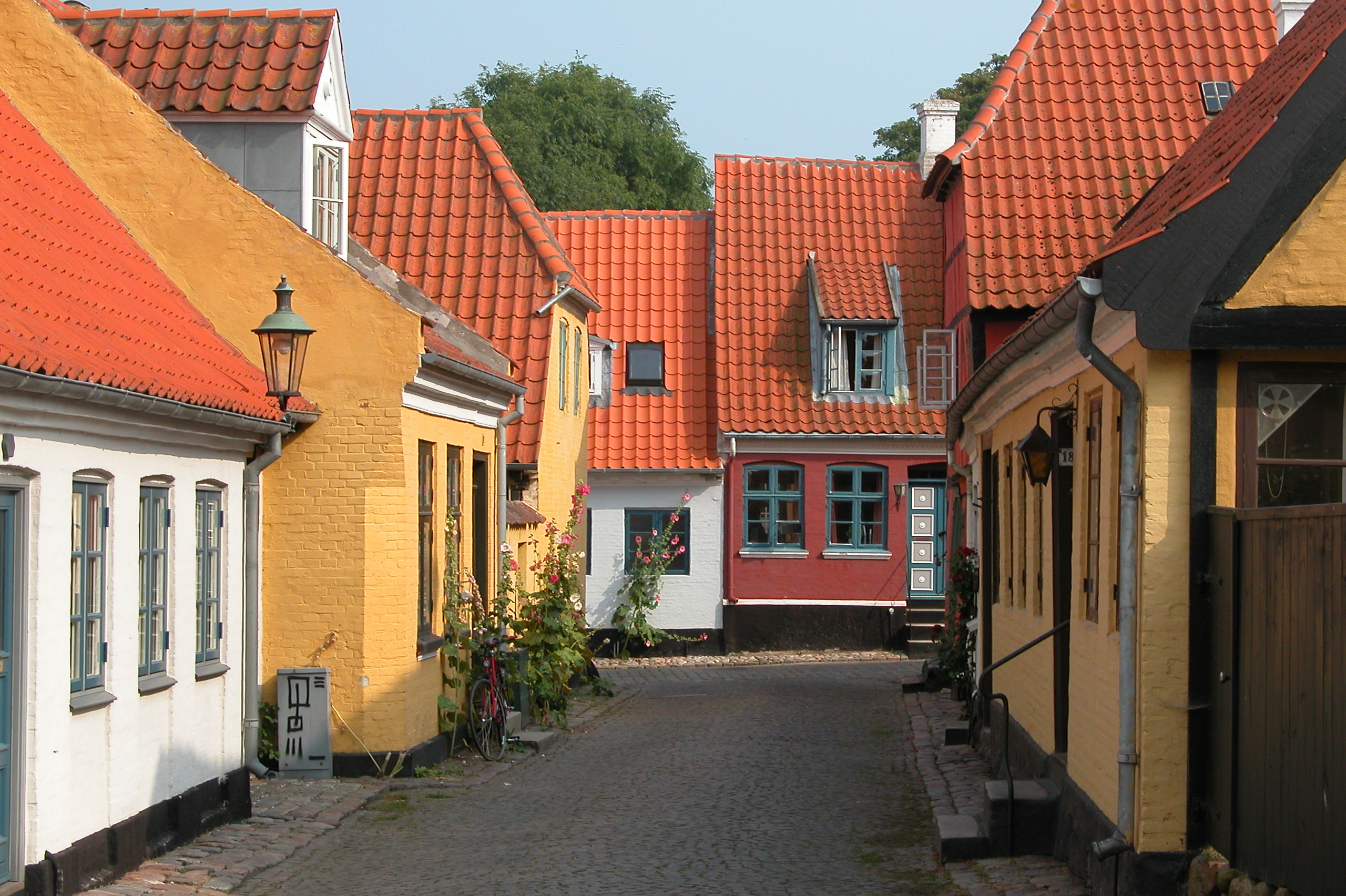
In the town of Ærøskøbing

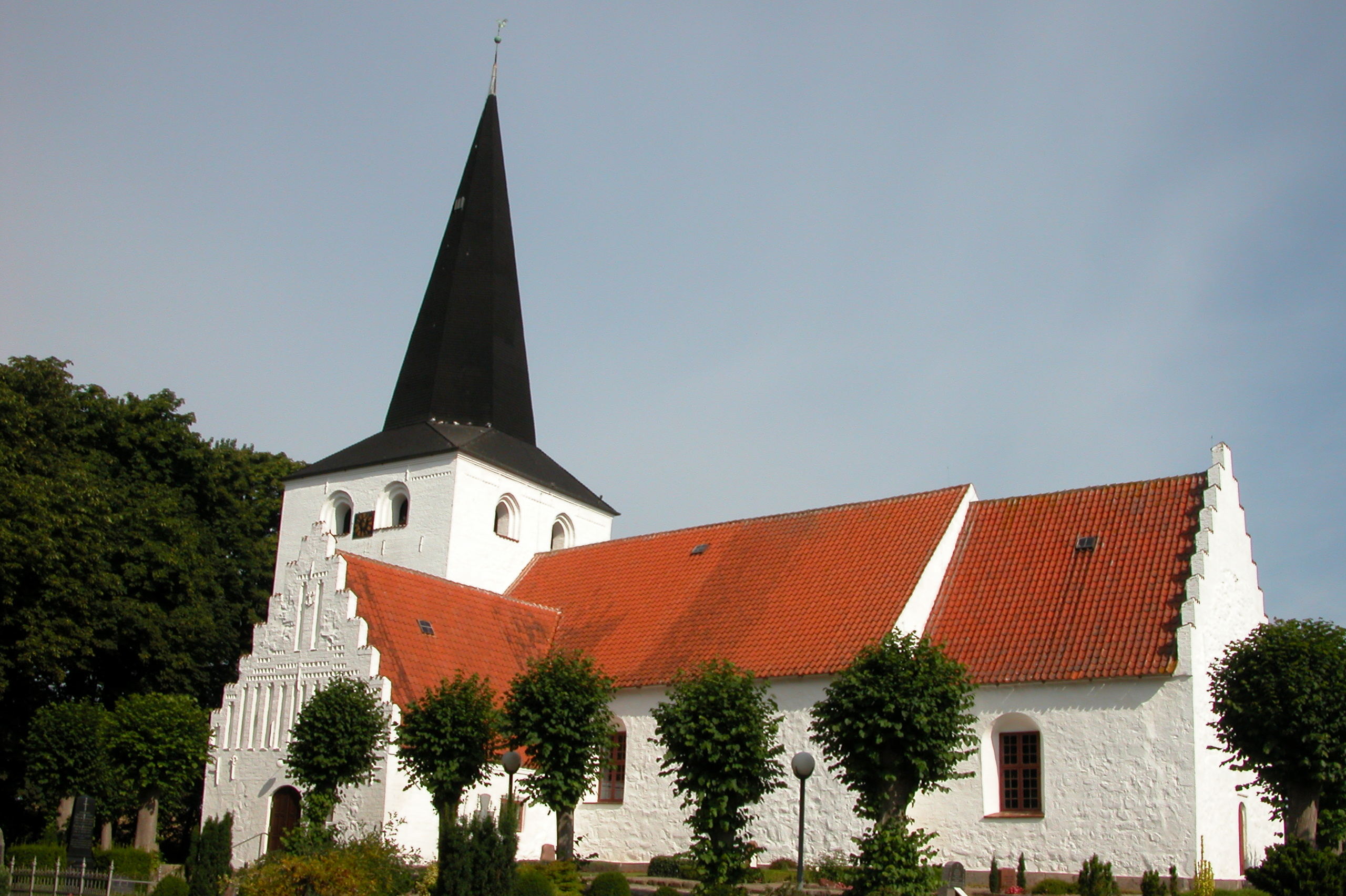
Bregninge church

Archaeological excavations provide evidence of settlements going back to before 8000 BC. There are some burial mounds on the island, as well as an old Ting place. Relics of antiquity are found all over the island. Burial mounds, passage graves, and dolmens bear witness of human activity through more than 10,000 years.

As for its more recent history, the period of the duchies is of special interest. During this period — from the 14th century to the year 1864 – Ærø was united and separated, alternately, into a number of enclaves. Ærø was outside the tariff wall of the Kingdom, leading to flourishing smuggling which was a way of living for many of Ærø's inhabitants.

In 1629 the main town of Ærøskøbing burnt down in a great fire. There was no other disaster of comparable scale. In 1750 the island, previously split into exclaves of numerous duchies, was united as single administrative district.

Until 1864, Ærø was part of the Danish Duchy of Schleswig – the area of Schleswig/Southern Jutland is now divided between Denmark (Northern Schleswig) and Germany (Southern Schleswig). King Christian IV's cousin, also named Christian, was the Duke of Ærø from 1622 to 1633, and lived with his concubine Cathrine Griebels at Gråsten Manor House.

When the Duke died, a banner was found at Gråsten composed of nine pieces of cloth and in three colours – body colour, sea green, and golden yellow. This banner has provided the inspiration for the flag of Ærø which is seen today all over the island. When Duke Christian died, Ærø was distributed among four of his brothers, and this offers one explanation of why two towns developed in the island, Ærøskøbing and later on Marstal, and why each came to be in their own "country".

Gråsten Manor House was abolished in 1766 and the buildings were demolished. The name of Gråsten is still alive today in the farmhouse that stands almost on the same spot as the ducal manor. Gråsten of today offers bed and breakfast accommodation.

In 1750, Ærø was united, and has not since been separated. This is marked by the memorial stone at Olde Mølle (English = Ancient mill). At the union, the old Code of Jutland from 1241 was applied and even today some of those rules are still valid.

In recent history, the preservation of the area's local heritage has been paramount among residents. This passion for Ærø was demonstrated in 2000 when the Marstal Maritime School was ordered to close. More than 2,000 islanders (a third of the island) traveled to Copenhagen to protest the closing of the historic school. Ultimately, the government allowed the Maritime School to remain open.

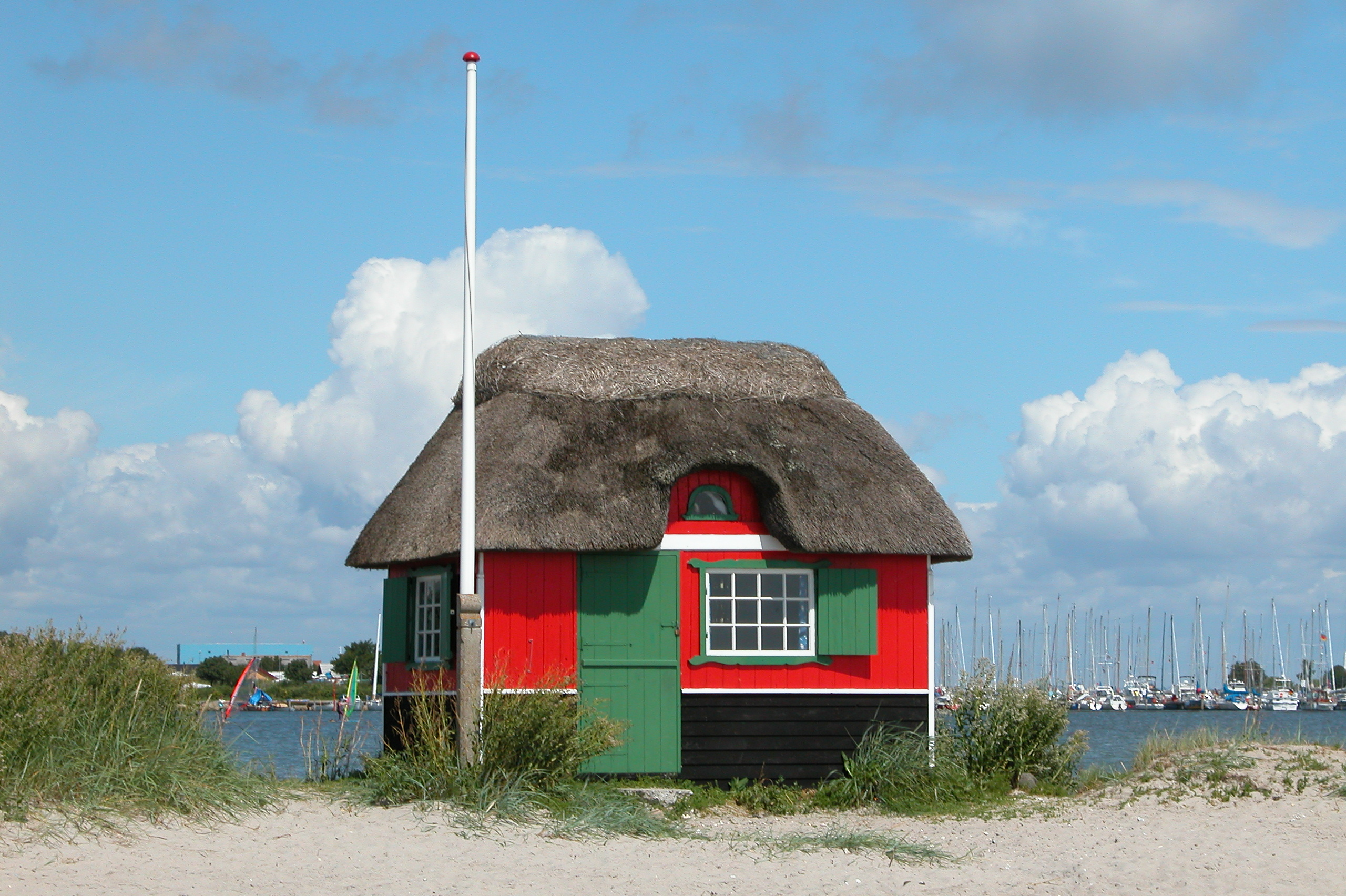
Beach hut, Marstal

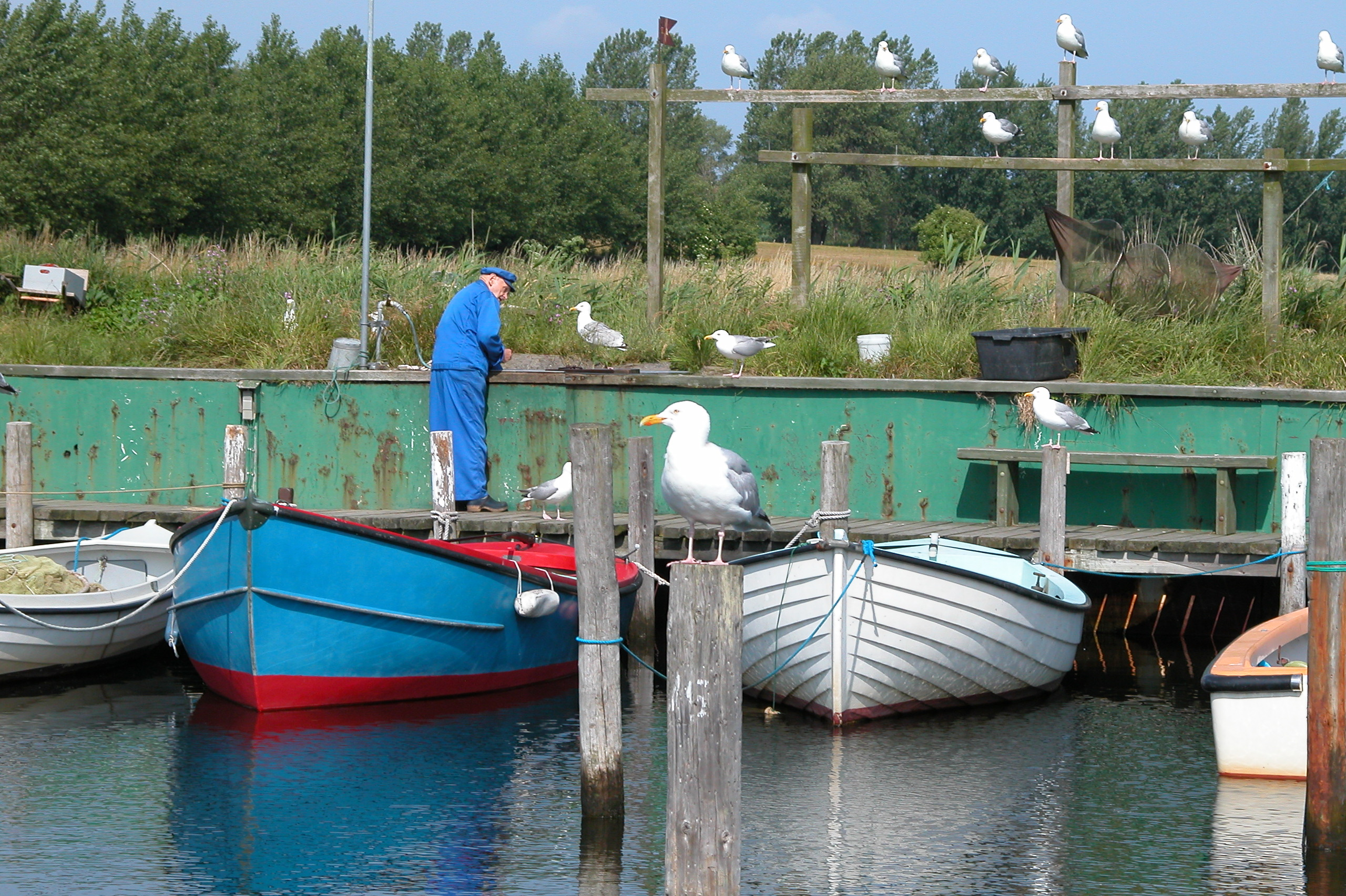
Strandbyen harbour, Ommel

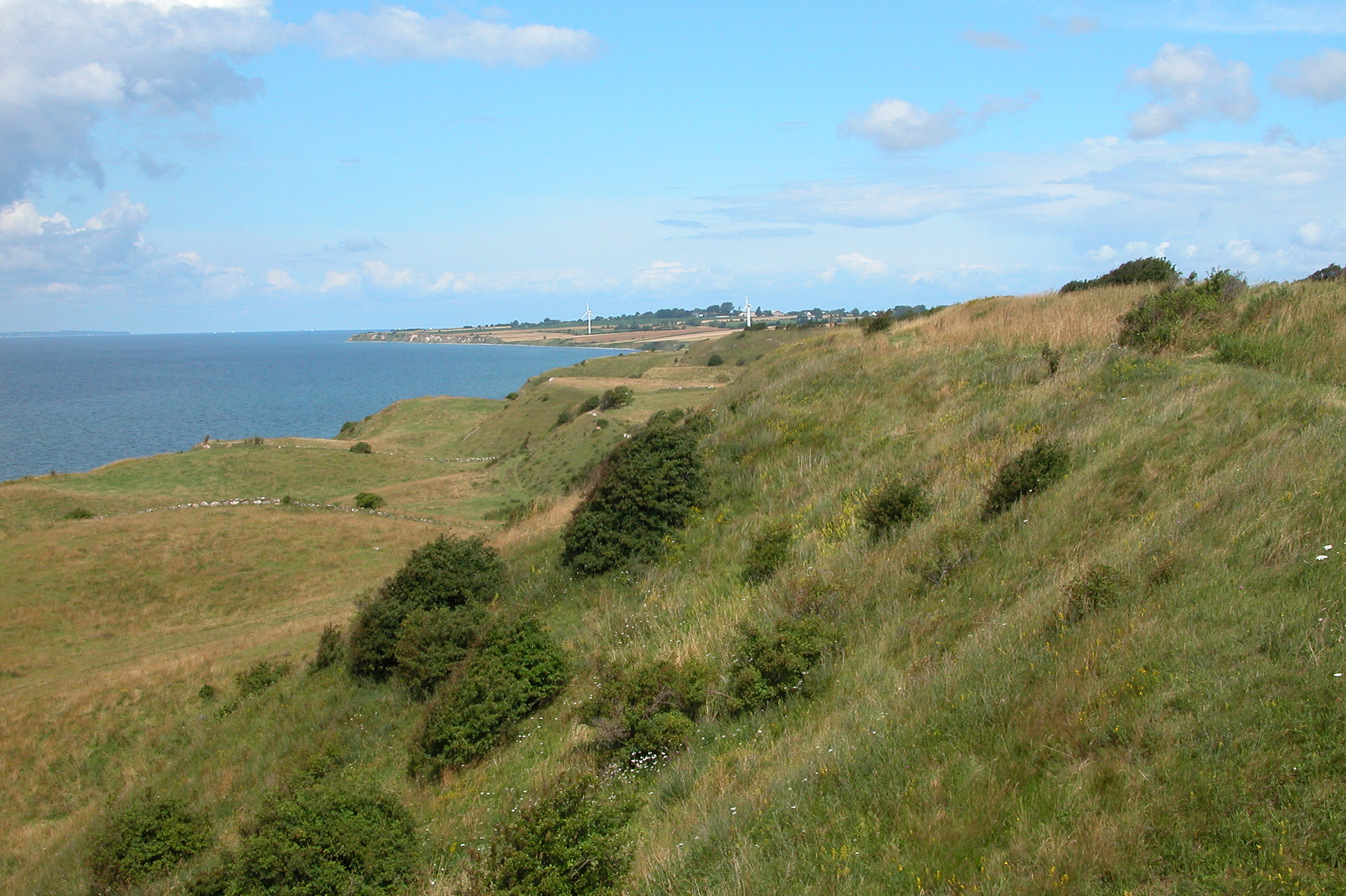
Voderup Klint cliffs

== Politics ==
A local political party, Ærø League (Danish: Ærølisten), won the municipal election in 2005 getting one seat in the municipal council. The party was founded in 2004 by the former Centre Democrats member Ebbe Kalnæs.

== Renewable energy and technology ==
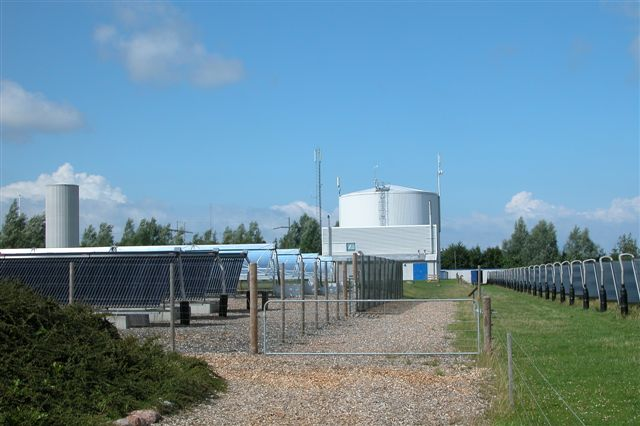
Solar heating park, Marstal

Ærø is endeavouring to become self-sufficient in energy, its initiatives in renewable energy technologies gaining international recognition for the island as one of the world's leaders in this field. Already in 2002, three modern wind turbines had been erected with turbines whose wingtips reach 100 m (330 ft) above the ground. making the island around 40% self-sufficient in renewable energy. As of January 2013, the area of the island's large solar power plant was expanded from 18,365 m^{2} to 33,300 m^{2} as a result of an extension under the Sunstone 4 project.

Ærø's three district heating systems of solar collectors have won international acclaim. With the recent expansion, the system in Marstal is now the world's largest solar collector system for heating.

From August 2019, the island has been served by the E-ferry Ellen, an innovative low weight ferry for cars and passengers, powered by green electricity stored by on-board batteries. Built by Søby Værft, the ferry's design is well beyond state-of-the-art in terms of charging power and operating distance. It was partly funded by a €17 million grant through the EU's Horizon 2020 scheme.

== Transport ==
Ærø is the only island among the larger Danish Baltic Sea islands that is not connected with a bridge, and road traffic is generally low. There are car ferry lines on four routes.

Ferries from Fynshav (on Als) and Faaborg on Funen arrive at Søby near Ærø's northwestern tip. Twin ferries M/F Ærøskøbing and M/F Marstal operate on the route from Svendborg arriving at Ærøskøbing. The route between Marstal and Rudkøbing on Langeland was stopped for several years after January 2013 but since 2019 is once again operable using the M/F ÆrøXpressen.

Ærø also lies within a popular sailboat area, the South Funen Archipelago. Near Marstal lies the small Ærø Airport with grass runways.

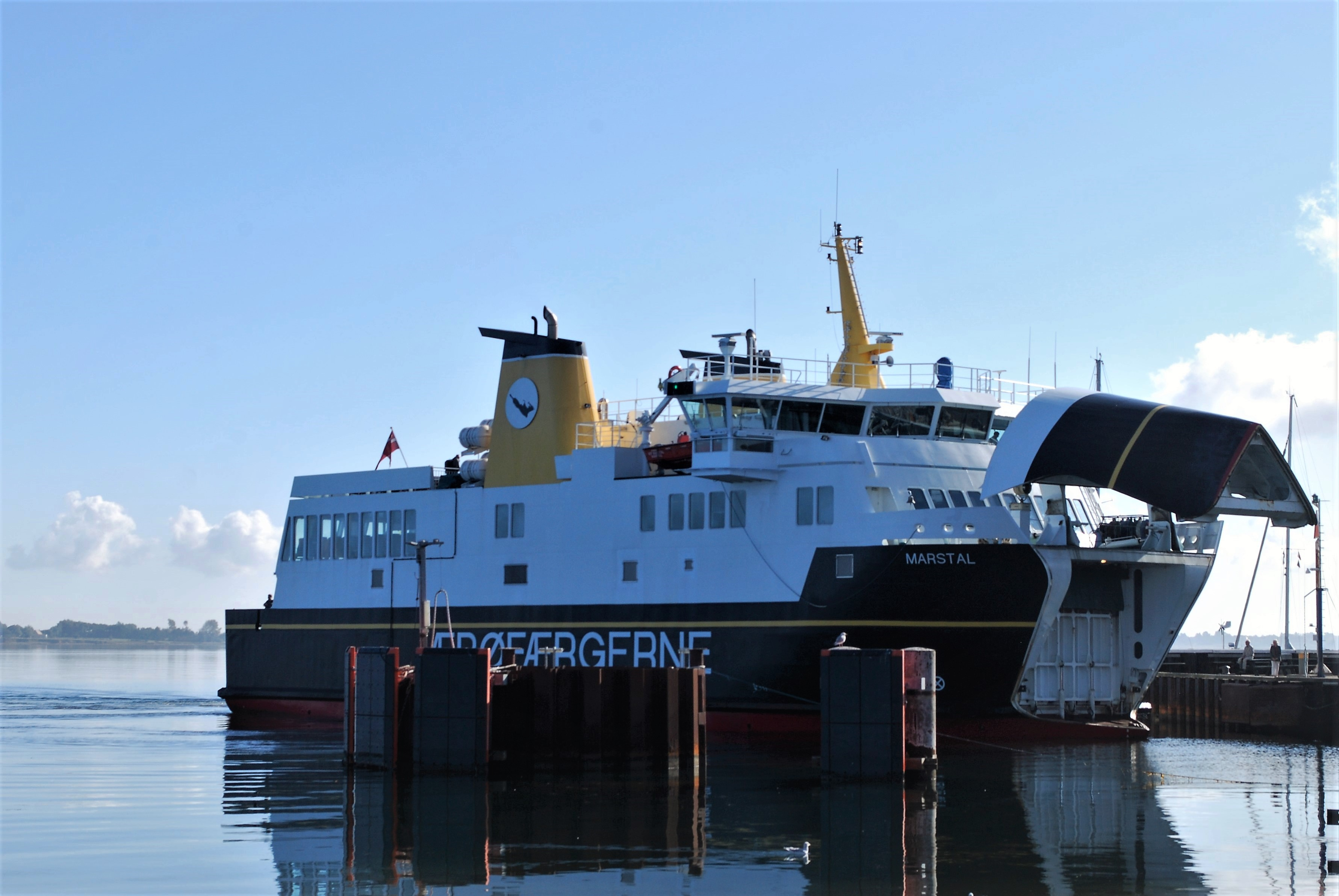
M/F Marstal, 1999- Ærøskøbing-Svendborg

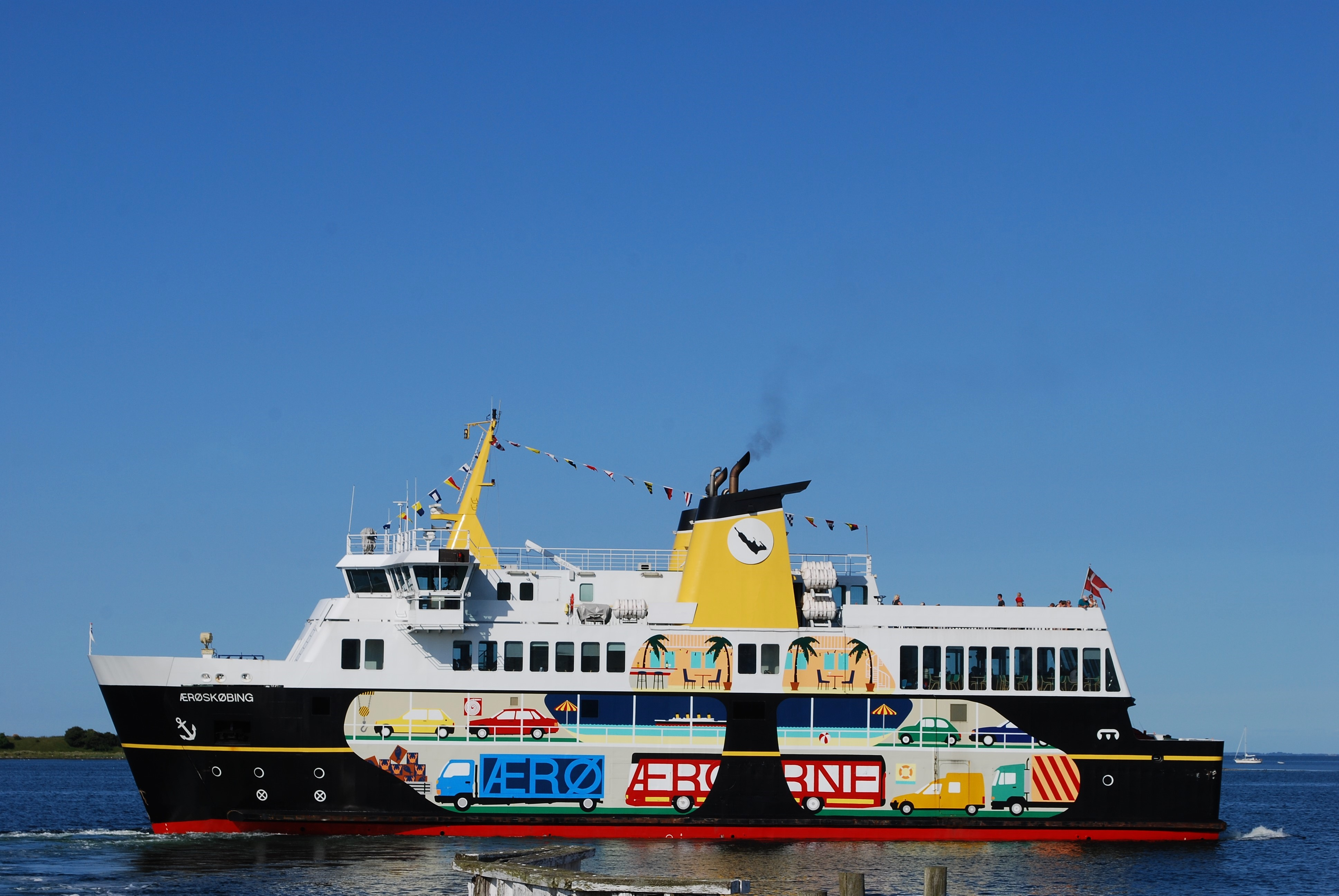
M/F Ærøkøbing, 1999- Ærøskøbing-Svendborg

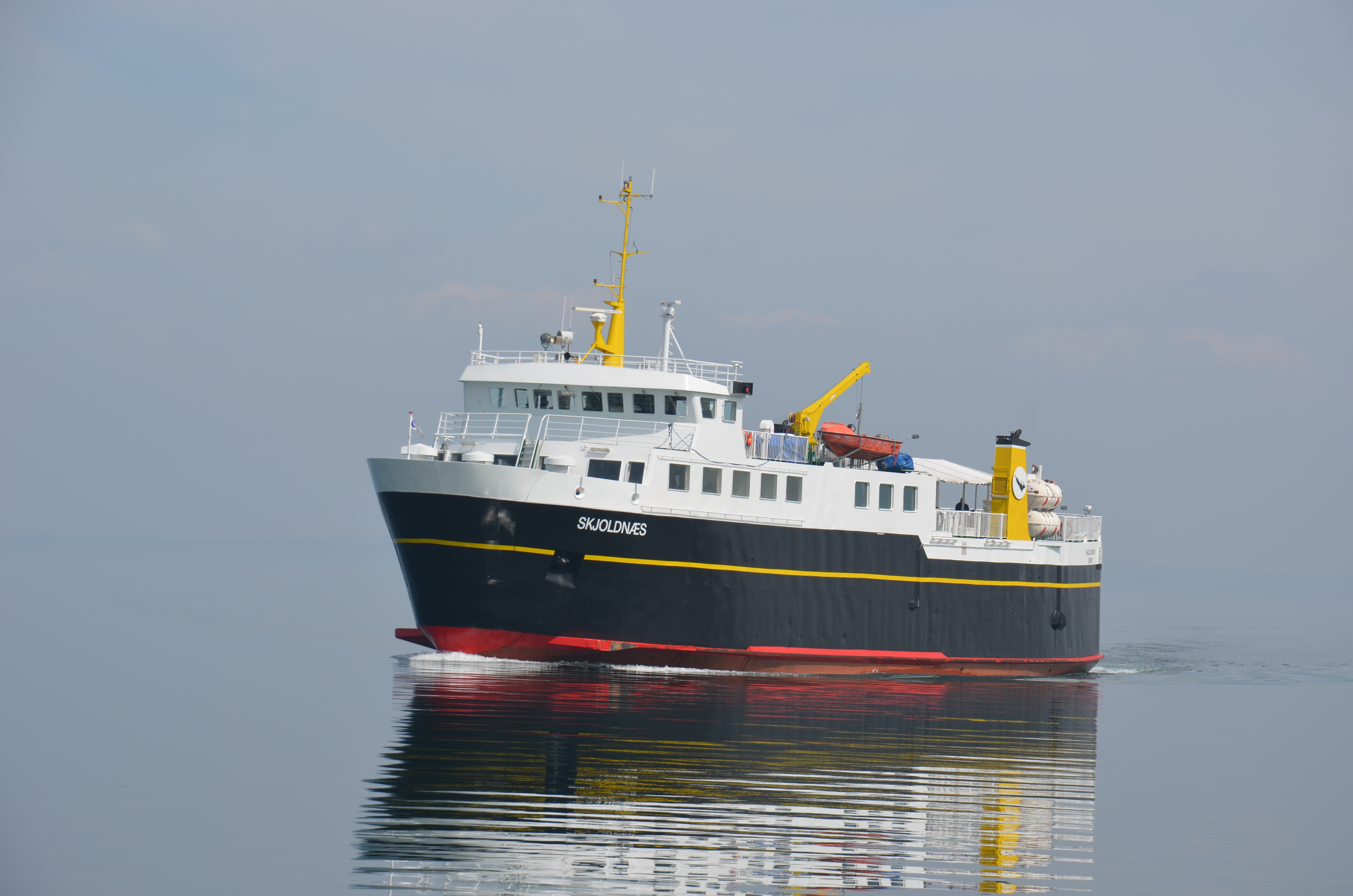
M/F Skjoldnæs, 2012- Søby-Fåborg

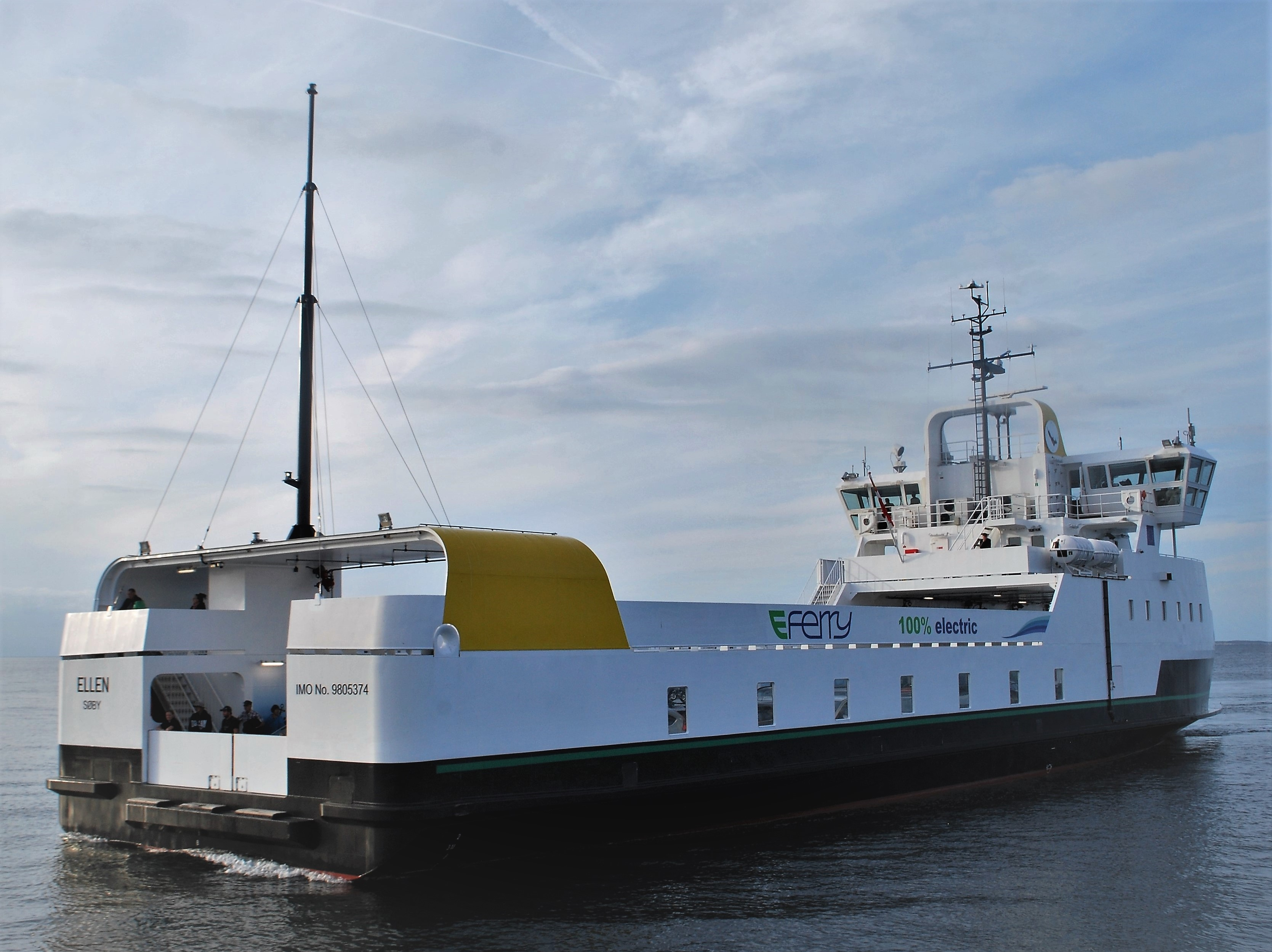
E-ferry Ellen, 2019- Søby-Fynshav on the island Als

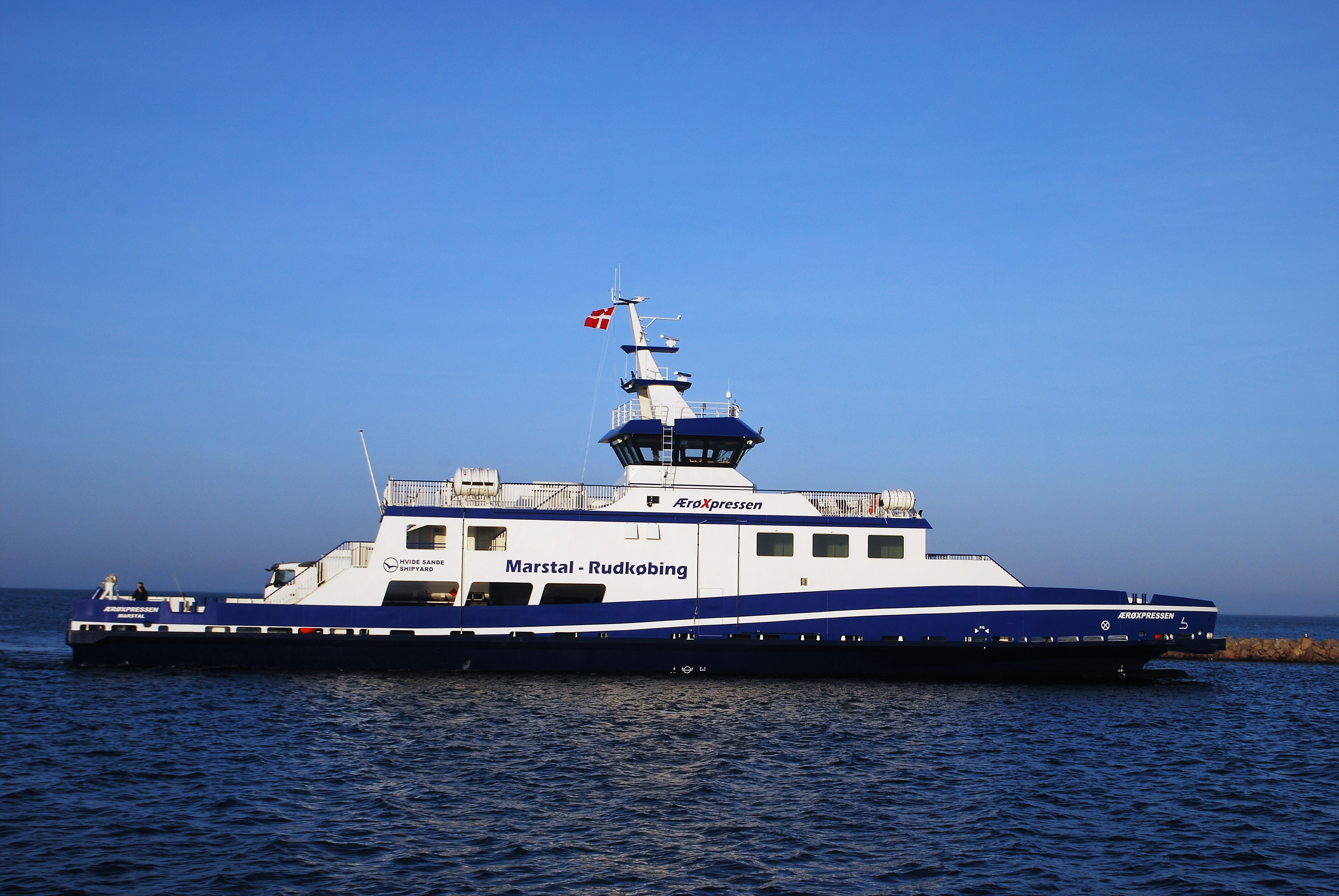
M/F ÆrøXpressen, 2019- Marstal-Rudkøbing

== Notable residents ==
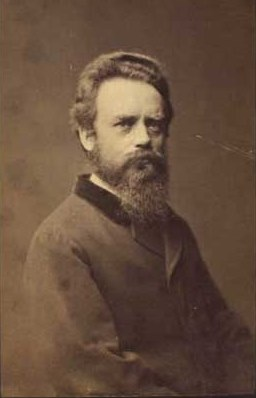
Carl Rasmussen, 1870

- Anders Arrebo (1587 in Ærøskøbing – 1637) a Danish poet and Lutheran bishop in the Diocese of Nidaros
- Albert Heinrich Riise (1810 in Ærøskøbing – 1882) a Danish pharmacist, merchant, and manufacturer of rum on Saint Thomas in the Danish West Indies
- Claus Lauritz Clausen (1820 in Borgnæs – 1892) Lutheran clergyman, organizer of United Norwegian Lutheran Church of America and missionary to America
- Carl Rasmussen (1841 in Ærøskøbing – 1893) a Danish painter of marine art and scenes of Greenland.
- Povla Frijsh (1881 in Ærø - 1960) a Danish classical soprano and voice teacher
- Hermann Møller Boye (1913 in Rolpested – 1944) a member of the Danish resistance executed by the German occupying power.
- Carsten Jensen (born 1952 in Marstal) a Danish author and political columnist
- Solvej Balle (born 1962), a Danish writer, moved to the island in 2005

== Cultural references ==
- In his 2006 novel We, The Drowned – an epic tale spanning four generations, nearly one hundred years, and two world wars – Carsten Jensen describes the maritime history of Marstal, his native town, where the men were expected to go to sea and the women to be left behind.

== See also ==
- List of islands of Denmark
