= Genevieve Barr =

English screenwriter and actor

- Born: Genevieve Louise Barr; Harrogate, England
- Occupations: Actress, writer
- Years active: 2010–present

Genevieve Barr is an English screenwriter, playwright and actor. She wrote Then Barbara Met Alan (2022) with Jack Thorne for BBC and Netflix to popular and critical acclaim, winning best single drama at the Broadcast Awards in 2023. It has been announced Channel 4 is filming her thriller series, I.D. As well as being an actor, best known for her breakout role in BBC's The Silence, she is a co-founder of Underlying Health Condition which led to the launch of The TV Access Project (TAP), in Spring 2022.

== Early life and education ==
Barr was born in Harrogate. She competed in sport at a high level as a teenager, playing rounders for England U16, lacrosse for Scotland senior and winning national competitions as a high-board diver until she retired from the sport at onset of university. She studied English Literature and History at the University of Edinburgh, graduating with upper second-class honours in 2008. She taught in a secondary school in Bermondsey as part of Teach First's graduate scheme.

== Career ==
=== Writing ===
Barr's writing for television started in 2020. It includes CripTales (BBC, 2020), Then Barbara Met Alan (BBC, Netflix, 2022). Barr wrote an episode of Ralph and Katie the spin-off series of Peter Bowker's The A Word (2023), She won the prolific Red Planet Prize for ITV with Curio.

In 2022, Channel 4 greenlit her upcoming thriller series I.D, produced by Eleven.

== Acting ==
=== Television ===
Barr was one of the rising stars in Channel 4's comedy showcase, playing alongside Rhys Darby and Darren Boyd, written by Harry and Jack Williams. She went on to be cast as the lead in BBC's The Silence, alongside Douglas Henshall, Hugh Bonneville, Gina McKee and Dervla Kirwan, directed by Dearbhla Walsh.

In 2011, after The Silence came out, Barr went on to roles in Shameless (2012) for Channel 4 and BBC3's award-winning drama The Fades (2012), directed by Farren Blackburn and Tom Shankland. This was the first time Barr and Jack Thorne worked together before they were reunited with Thorne's hit play The Solid Life of Sugar Water.

In 2013, Barr starred alongside Jane Horrocks in ITV's True Love, directed by Dominic Savage of the I Am... series for Channel 4, and featured in BBC's Murder on the Victorian Railway.

In 2014, Barr played June Dillon in the season 4 finale of BBC's Call the Midwife.

2016 saw Barr in ITV's hit show Liar reunited with writers Harry and Jack Williams. Liar was renewed for a second season, starring Joanne Froggatt. Following this, Genevieve was cast in Mike Bartlett's Press (BBC), directed by Tom Vaughn.

Returning after the birth of her first child, Barr starred in The Accident, for Channel 4 alongside Sarah Lancashire, written by Jack Thorne. The last in a mini-series trilogy including National Treasure and Kiri, it became the highest rated drama premiere of 2019. Barr was subsequently named on Screen Daily's 2021 Stars of Tomorrow list.

=== Theatre ===
In 2014, Genevieve toured internationally with Brian Friel's Translations, directed by Line of Duty actor Adrian Dunbar. Following this, in the summer of 2015 she performed in delicate two-hander The Solid Life of Sugar Water at Edinburgh Festival Fringe, produced by Graeae Theatre Company and Theatre Royal Plymouth, written by Jack Thorne. After winning five star reviews at the Fringe. it did a UK tour in early 2016, with a run at the National Theatre in March 2016.

Later that year, she performed Unreachable at the Royal Court, alongside Matt Smith and Tamara Lawrance. The play was written and directed by Anthony Neilson.

=== Film ===
Film credits include Been So Long in cinemas and on Netflix. Barr played Artemis, with a cast of Michaela Coel and Arinze Kene and was directed by BAFTA winning director, Tinge Krishnan.

=== Radio ===
Barr featured in BBC Radio 4's The Three Sisters, an adaptation of Chekhov's, adapted and directed by Polly Thomas and Jenny Sealey in 2019.

=== Commercials ===
Barr starred in Maltesers advert 'Theo's Dog' in 2016, as part of a huge international campaign celebrating diversity. It was the first advert to ever be aired solely in British Sign Language with captions.

== Campaigning and advocacy ==
Barr has been a long-term advocate for the disabled community in television. Born profoundly deaf, Barr wears hearing aids in both ears and lipreads, learning sign language in her twenties. Barr identifies as both deaf and disabled, seeing the disabled community as a crucial part of her life. She has written and co-written disabled dramas, Criptales, Ralph and Katie and Then Barbara Met Alan, as well as worked with Graeae Theatre Company over the past ten years.

In August 2021, Jack Thorne delivered the Edinburgh Television Festival's MacTaggart Lecture. He used the speech to discuss television's power as an "empathy box" in the living room of millions and the failings of the industry towards disabled people. Alongside Barr and Katie Player, Thorne announced a pressure group called Underlying Health Condition. The name refers to the suffering of disabled people during the COVID-19 pandemic, in which the media rendered huge numbers of deaths acceptable through usage of the term "Underlying health condition".

On Friday, December 3, 2021, Underlying Health Condition was launched at an event at the Tate Modern, collaborating with other disability organisations such as Disabled Artists Networking Community, Deaf and Disabled People in Television, the Creative Diversity Network and 1in4 Coalition, to propose a series of measures to accommodate and support disabled artists in television.

This in turn lead to the launch of The TV Access Project, or TAP, which has seen 10 of the UK's biggest broadcasters commit to the full inclusion of Deaf Disabled and/or Neurodivergent Talent by 2030. TAP created best practice guidelines to ensure this inclusion, referred to as the 5As: Anticipate, Ask, Assess, Adjust, Advocate.

Within its first year, TAP delivered 20 sustainable, tangible solutions towards its vision of full inclusion, including launching TAPStars, a programme funded by the broadcasters and streamers who are TAP members to support early-career disabled off-screen talent; introducing an Access To Work pilot scheme to fast-track applications and access provision for freelances, and oversee reimbursements from Access to Work; securing a commitment from all TAP members to fund necessary access costs not covered by Access to Work, over and above the production budget; giving 82 Commissioning Editors and senior leaders from TAP members fundamental 5As training, delivered by CDN; and writing an outline of key access-related roles and responsibilities across productions and commissioning, to be adopted alongside access coordinators.

In August 2024, it was announced that all 10 TAP members - the BBC, Channel 4, ITV, Disney+, UKTV, BritBox, Sky UK, Paramount Pictures, STV and Amazon Prime Video - would boycott any studios and production spaces which had not completed the TV Access Project's accessibility audit by August 2025. This audit requires studios to self-assess their own accessibility in 4 key areas: Production buildings, Locations - external, Locations - Internal, and Outside Broadcast.

== Personal life ==
Barr is married with two children.

== Filmography ==
=== Writing ===
Year	Title	Writer	Executive producer	Creator	Notes
2020	Criptales	Yes	No	No	Episode 3 "Thunderbox"
2022	Then Barbara Met Alan	Yes	No	No	Co-written with Jack Thorne
2023	Ralph and Katie	Yes	No	No	Episode 4 "Empty Nest"

== Awards ==
Year	Award	Category	Nominated work	Result	Ref.
2023	Royal Television Society Awards	Best Single Drama	Then Barbara Met Alan	Nominated	
2022	Writers' Guild of Great Britain Awards	Best Short Form TV Drama	Then Barbara Met Alan	Nominated	
2022	Broadcast Awards	Best Single Drama	Then Barbara Met Alan	Won	
2022	Broadcast Awards	Best Original Programme	Then Barbara Met Alan	Nominated	
2021	Prix Italia	TV Performing Arts	Crip Tales	Won	
2023	Banff Rockie Award	Best Feature Length Film	Then Barbara Met Alan	Nominated	
