= Kiruna Stamell =

Australian actress (born 1981)

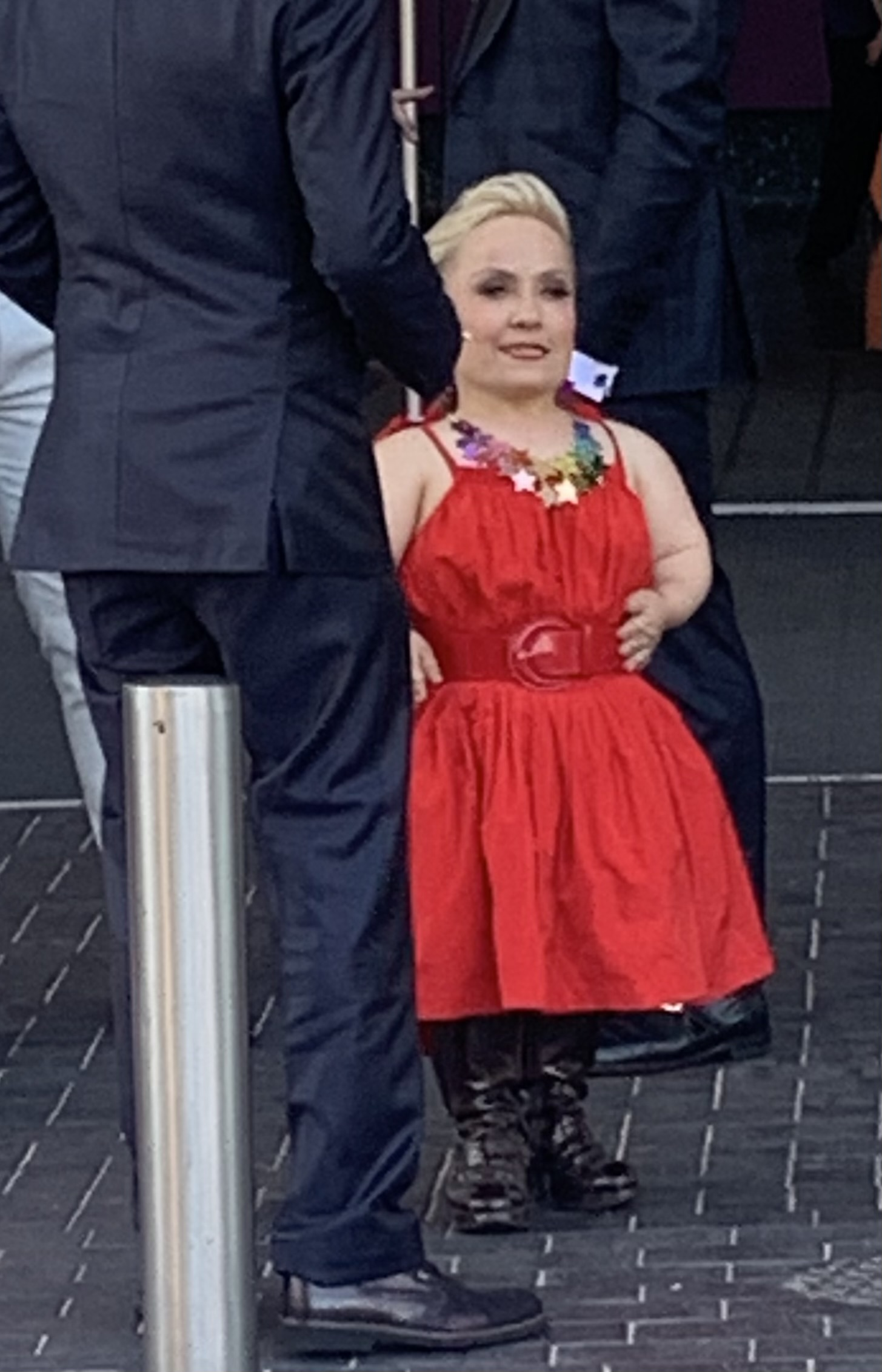
- Stamell in 2023
- Born: 13 March 1981 (age 45); Sydney, Australia
- Citizenship: Australian; British
- Education: University of New South Wales; LAMDA
- Occupation: Actress
- Height: 1.06 m (3 ft 6 in)
- Spouse: Gareth Berliner (m. 2012)
- Website: www.kirunastamell.net

Kiruna Stamell (born 13 March 1981) is an Australian-British actress. After appearing in various series and films including Moulin Rouge! (2001), All the Small Things (2009) and Cast Offs (2009), she presented the Australian children's educational series Play School from 2018 to 2020. She also portrayed the role of Kirsty Millar on the British soap opera Doctors between 2023 and 2024.

== Early and personal life ==
Stamell was born in Sydney as the eldest of three children to George and Kerry, both teachers who became information technology professionals. She was named after the Swedish city of Kiruna, where her parents had travelled to see the Northern Lights. She has dwarfism caused by the rare genetic condition Acromesomelic dysplasia, resulting in a height of 1.06 metres (3 ft 6 in); her younger identical twin sisters also have dwarfism due to the same condition. She first learnt to dance at the age of three, when she learned ballet, contemporary dance and tap. Stamell said it took her until the age of eight to find a teacher who treated her properly as a dancer, rather than as someone with dwarfism. At the age of 14, she won the South Pacific Silver Star Tap Dancing Championships, and in 2000, she tap danced at the opening ceremony of the Sydney Olympics.

Whilst growing up, Stamell believed that she could not have a normal relationship due to her dwarfism. She told off the first boy to try to kiss her as she thought there was a rule that he could not date her; she believed he would be teased. Stamell began a relationship with stand-up comedian Gareth Berliner after meeting him at a comedy club. They were married in 2012. In 2014, Stamell won a disability discrimination case against the post office on the grounds that its chip and pin machines were too difficult to reach for people with dwarfism and people in wheelchairs.

Stamell is involved in the disability arts movement and was an original co-founder of Atypical Theatre Company in Australia. She was also the co-director of A Little Commitment Ltd, a production company run in conjunction with husband Berliner. Stamell remains based in England and is a British citizen.

== Career ==
While studying dance, theatre and film at the University of New South Wales, Stamell developed a passion for theatre and acting. She acted in a number of short plays at the university. In the summer holiday of her first year, she got her first major role when she submitted herself for extra work in the film Moulin Rouge!. Her initial casting as an extra led to the part of La Petite Princess being created especially for her. She then auditioned for Australia's National Institute of Dramatic Art (NIDA), but was rejected because the institution felt there were not enough roles for people with short stature. As a consequence, she then went to England to study Shakespearean and Jacobean plays during a summer course at the London Academy of Music and Dramatic Art (LAMDA). Following this, she performed with some of Australia's leading theatre companies, including her role as King Duncan in Macbeth for the Sydney Theatre Company and Cordelia in King Lear for Round Earth. She also appeared in the Australian short film Love Hurts as Cupid. She graduated from the University of New South Wales in 2003.

In 2005, Stamell returned to England after receiving funding from the Australia Council for a three-month secondment with the Graeae Theatre Company. While there, she obtained a number of professional stage roles in the UK, performing with the Quarantine Theatre Company and Graeae Theatre Company, and renewed her interest in dance with a secondment to CandoCo. She was generally well reviewed for her work in Graeae Theatre Company's production of Whiter Than Snow playing a young actress who wanted to break with stereotype and play the role of Snow White. Although otherwise filing a mixed review, Lyn Gardner of The Guardian wrote: "...the show raises interesting questions about humans' constant attempts to improve on nature, and as the diminutive heroine, Frieda, who longs to be Snow White but is always cast as a dwarf, Kiruna Stamell is outstanding." Stamell also toured extensively throughout Europe with Campo, formerly known as Victoria, with their production of For All The Wrong Reasons.

In the late 2000s, Stamell was a frequent guest presenter on the BBC's Ouch! podcast. Stamell debuted on British television in 2009 when she appeared as Phoebe Tunstall in the six-part BBC drama series All the Small Things, and has made appearances on EastEnders as Sandra Fielding, starred in Cast Offs for Channel 4, and in 2011 as Amy in Life's Too Short for BBC 2. In 2012, she auditioned for the Sky 1 series Got to Dance. She was unanimously voted through the first round, but got no further. In 2013, she appeared in Giuseppe Tornatore's film, The Best Offer, and a year later, starred in a production of Great Britain for the National Theatre.

In 2022, she starred in the Starz series The Serpent Queen. In January 2023, Stamell began appearing as receptionist Kirsty Millar in the BBC soap opera Doctors. Alongside co-stars Richard Atwill and Isaac Benn, Stamell was nominated for the Best Family accolade at the 2023 British Soap Awards.

== Filmography ==
=== Film ===
Year	Title	Role	Notes
2001	Moulin Rouge!	La Petite Princess	Film
2005	Love Hurts	Cupid	Short film
2013	The Best Offer	Girl in the Bar	Feature film
2019	Judy & Punch	Mavis	Feature film

=== Television ===
Year	Title	Role	Notes
2001	Life Support	PA	1 episode
2008–2009	EastEnders	Sandra Fielding	Guest role
2009	All The Small Things	Phoebe	Main role
2009	Cast Offs	Carrie	Main role
2011, 2013	Life's Too Short	Amy	Recurring role
2014	Holby City	Leonie Somers	Episode: "Estel"
2015	Father Brown	Enid Flay	Episode: "The Invisible Man"
2018–2020	Play School	Herself	Presenter
2019–2020	The New Pope	Abbess of the Monastery of Saint Therese	Recurring role
2020	Wuthering Heights	Isabella Linton	Guest role
2021	Brassic	June	1 episode
2022	The Serpent Queen	Mathilde	Main role
2023	Best Interests	Jane	1 episode
2023–2024	Doctors	Kirsty Millar	Regular role
2025	Doctor Who	Nina Maxwell	Episode: "The Interstellar Song Contest"

== Stage ==
Year	Title	Role	Venue
2002	Macbeth	King Duncan	Sydney Theatre Company
2003	Preserving the Apple	Rai	Drill Hall, London
2005	Grace	Devisor / Performer	Quarantine
2006	The Maids	Claire	Atypical Theatre Company
2007	King Lear	Cordelia	Round Earth Theatre Company
2007, 2009	Whiter Than Snow	Frieda	Tour
2008	For All the Wrong Reasons	Femme Fatal	Contact Theatre, Manchester
2009	The Ugly Spirit		Contact Theatre, Manchester
2010	A Midsummer Night's Dream	Starveling	Octagon Theatre, Bolton
2011	Peeling	Beaty	Forest Forge
2011	The Lost Happy Endings	Sparrow / Witch	Midlands Arts Centre / Red Earth
2014	Parrot and Pirate	Cutlass Kate	A Little Commitment / Red Earth
2014	Great Britain	Wendy Klinkard	Lyttelton Theatre, West End
2015	An Oak Tree	Father	National Theatre
2015	Everyman	Discrection	National Theatre
2016	The Government Inspector	Anna	Birmingham Repertory Theatre
2016	Sleeping Beauty	Good Fairy	Hackney Empire
2018	Jane Eyre	Bessie Lee / Teacher / Maria Temple	Octagon Theatre, Bolton
2018	Hamlet	Guildenstern	Octagon Theatre, Bolton
2019	Them!	Host	National Theatre of Scotland
2020	Cyrano de Bergerac	Marie-Louise	ATG / Playhouse Theatre, London
2022	The Ministry of Lesbian Affairs	Fi	Soho Theatre, London
