= Liz Carr =

English actress and comedian (born 1972)

- Born: Elizabeth Anne Carr; 21 April 1972 (age 54); Bebington, Wirral, England
- Education: University of Nottingham
- Occupations: Actress; comedian; broadcaster; disability rights activist
- Television: Silent Witness; Better Off Dead?
- Spouse: Jo Church (m. 2010)

Elizabeth Anne Carr (born 21 April 1972) is an English actress, comedian, broadcaster and international disability rights activist. She is known for playing Clarissa Mullery in the BBC crime drama Silent Witness (2013–2020), for campaigning for disabled rights, and for fronting the BBC documentary Better Off Dead? (2024).

== Early life and education ==
Carr was born on 21 April 1972 in Port Sunlight and grew up in Bebington, Cheshire. She attended Upton Hall School FCJ in Upton, Merseyside and Birkenhead High School in Birkenhead. She studied law at the University of Nottingham.

== Career ==
=== Comedy ===
She has been part of a number of comedy groups, including Abnormally Funny People with Tanyalee Davis, Steve Day, Steve Best, Simon Minty and Chris McCausland.

In 2007 she was runner-up in the Hackney Empire New Act of the Year competition.

Carr co-hosted the BBC's Royal Television Society award-winning Ouch! Podcast with Mat Fraser from 2006 to 2013, and in 2011 worked as a researcher for the BBC comedy panel show Have I Got News for You.

=== Acting ===
Carr was in her thirties when she took on her first professional acting role, playing Mother Courage in Mother Courage and Her Children, before heading to the Young Vic with another Bertolt Brecht play, The Exception and the Rule. In 2013, she joined the long-running BBC crime thriller series Silent Witness as regular character Clarissa Mullery. On 5 February 2020 it was announced that she had left the series after eight years.

In 2019, Carr starred in The OA as Dr Marlow Rhodes. In 2020, she appeared as a university lecturer in the miniseries Devs.

In March 2021, it was announced that Carr had joined the cast of The Witcher as Fenn in the show's second series. In December of the same year, it was announced that she had joined the cast of Good Omens for the second series, as the angel Saraqael. Between September and December 2021, she played Dr Emma Brookner in the West End revival of The Normal Heart at the Royal National Theatre, marking the first time a disabled person had played the role on stage. She subsequently won the Laurence Olivier Award for Best Actress in a Supporting Role at the 2022 Laurence Olivier Awards. Carr joined the cast of series 2 of Disney+’s Loki in the role of Judge Gamble.

== Disability activism ==
Carr has been disabled from age seven, owing to arthrogryposis multiplex congenita, and has used a wheelchair since the age of 14. She is frank about her life as a disabled person and the inherent comedy it brings: "I've had some tuts, which is fantastic... I look quite frail to some people, so it's like, 'She's talking about sex, she's swearing.' Every stereotype you didn't expect. People generally look terrified. 'Oh my God, is she going to be funny? Can we laugh at this?'"

Carr became involved in politics, disabled rights, and activism while studying at the University of Nottingham. Following her graduation she left law to work as a disability equality trainer. She has been a disability rights campaigner in the UK and has spoken at many rallies. In May 2008 she joined with ADAPT, a prominent disability rights group in the United States, to raise money for it and to protest against presidential candidate John McCain's position on a bill permitting Americans qualifying for Medicaid coverage of nursing home costs to instead spend it on home-based, or community care, making it easier for disabled people to remain in their own homes.

In 2011, Carr was part of a Newsnight debate on assisted suicide, following the screening on the BBC of Terry Pratchett: Choosing to Die, which included Jeremy Paxman and David Aaronovitch. She opposed Lord Falconer's Assisted Dying Bill, stating: "I fear we've so devalued certain groups of people—ill people, disabled people, older people—that I don't think it's in their best interests to enshrine in law the right of doctors to kill certain people."

In 2024, Carr presented a documentary, Better Off Dead?, advocating against assisted suicide. In 2025, Carr appeared at Greenbelt Festival to share her reasons for believing that the UK should not legalise assisted suicide.

== Personal life ==
In 2010 Carr entered into a civil partnership with longtime partner Jo Church in what Carr called "A Wheelie Special Wedding". Her father gave a speech in which he joked he was prohibited from using words such as "brave". Carr and her partner prerecorded their first dance. In the video, they danced to the Dirty Dancing theme and the local fire brigade held Carr and her chair aloft.

On 10 August 2017 Carr and her personal assistant were the victims of an attack by a man armed with scissors. The assailant was subsequently arrested and detained under the Mental Health Act 2007.

== Filmography ==
=== Film ===
Year	Title	Role	Notes
2017	Le Accelerator	The Death Provider	
2021	Infinite	Garrick	
2022	Then Barbara Met Alan	Liz	

=== Television ===
Year	Title	Role	Notes
2013–2020	Silent Witness	Clarissa Mullery	79 episodes
2018	Les Misérables	Concierge	Episode #1.1
2019	The OA	Dr Marlow Rhodes	2 episodes
2019	Would I Lie To You?	Herself	Series 13
2020	Devs	Lecturer	Episode #1.5
2020	CripTales	Meg	2 episodes
2021	The Witcher	Fenn	2 episodes
2022	This Is Going to Hurt	Tina	Episode #1.7
2023	Good Omens	Saraqael	3 episodes
2023	Loki	Judge Gamble	3 episodes
2024	Better Off Dead?	Herself	BBC One documentary
2026	Death Valley	Fiona Challoner	1 episode

=== Stage ===
Year	Title	Role	Notes
2021	The Normal Heart	Dr Emma Brookner	Royal National Theatre
2024	Unspeakable Conversations	Harriet McBryde Johnson	
