= Eleven Film (company) =

British television production company

- Logo used since 2017
- Type: Subsidiary
- Industry: Television; Film
- Genre: Scripted; Non-scripted
- Founded: 2006; 20 years ago
- Founders: Jamie Campbell; Joel Wilson
- Headquarters: London, UK
- Parent: Sony Pictures (2020–present)
- Website: elevenfilm.com

Eleven is a British television production company founded by Jamie Campbell and Joel Wilson and owned by Sony Pictures through its Television International Production division. It was formed in 2006 and was the first drama production company to benefit from the Channel 4 Growth Fund, set up to nurture independent creative companies based in the UK.

Eleven produces scripted and non-scripted content for the UK and international markets.

== History ==
Eleven was founded in 2006 by Jamie Campbell and Joel Wilson, named so due to the initial number of projects being undertaken by the pair.

The Channel 4 Growth Fund took a minority stake in Eleven in 2014, making it the first drama production company to benefit from their £20m fund.

In June 2020, American television production studio Sony Pictures Television announced that it had acquired a majority stake in Eleven Film, expanding Sony Pictures Television's drama production operations and its British television production with Channel 4 dropping its 20% stake in the company.

In February 2026, Sony Pictures Television announced that Campbell and Wilson were leaving the company after 20 years.

== Productions ==
Early significant output includes the critically acclaimed, multi-award nominated series Glue, an eight-part mystery drama for E4 written by multi-BAFTA winner Jack Thorne, starring Yasmin Paige, Billy Howle, Callum Turner, Charlotte Spencer, Jordan Stephens, and Phoebe Waller-Bridge; Gap Year, a comedy drama written by Tom Basden and the first UK TV scripted series to film in China for E4; BAFTA-Nominated The Enfield Haunting, a drama series starring Timothy Spall, Juliet Stevenson and Matthew Macfadyen for Sky Living; and BAFTA-nominated Cast Offs for Channel 4.

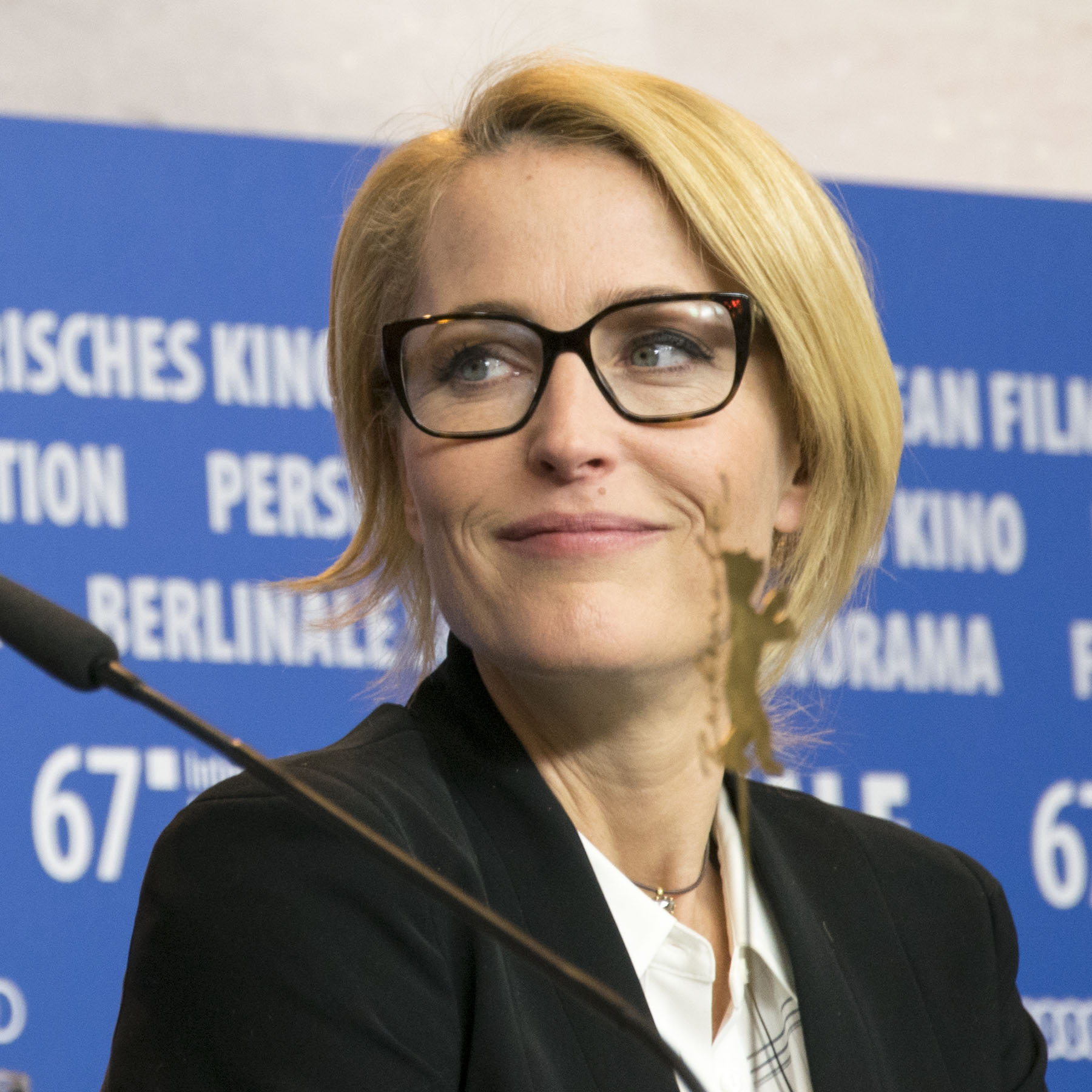
Gillian Anderson stars as Dr. Jean Milburn in Sex Education

The company's most successful project to date is Sex Education, a four series drama for Netflix released in 2019 and created by Laurie Nunn. The series received critical acclaim for its ensemble cast, writing, directing, production values, and mature treatment of its themes, with over 40 million viewers streaming the first series after its debut. The series has won two BAFTA TV Awards and the third series won Best Comedy at the 50th International Emmy Awards. Production for the fourth and final season of Sex Education was confirmed to be underway in August 2022 and it premiered on 21 September 2023.

In August 2019, BBC Three commissioned Red Rose, an eight part horror series created by The Clarkson Twins, which was released on BBC iPlayer on 15 August 2022.

In February 2020, it was announced that Netflix had commissioned a 10-part political drama named White Stork to be produced by Eleven. The series' cast was due to feature Tom Hiddleston as lead, with Claire Foy also rumoured to have been offered a role. Production was halted in the wake of the COVID-19 pandemic, which caused scheduling conflicts for Hiddleston.

In May 2022, the BBC and STAN commissioned a new series titled Ten Pound Poms, a drama about the British citizens who migrated to Australia after the Second World War, with filming commencing in Australia shortly after. The series premiered in May 2023 and won Best Series at the 62nd Monte-Carlo Television Festival. In February 2024, the BBC confirmed a second series had been commissioned which was released on Sunday 9 March 2025. The BBC did not commission a third series.

An eight-part mystery thriller, which centres around a young deaf woman, titled I.D., was announced by Channel 4 in August 2022. The series was created by Genevieve Barr.

In April 2023, the BBC announced that Eleven would produce the first ever television adaptation of the 1954 novel Lord of the Flies by Nobel Prize-winning British author William Golding. The executive producers are set to be Joel Wilson and Jamie Campbell for Eleven, Jack Thorne for One Shoe Films and Nawfal Faizullah. Filming was confirmed to be underway in Malaysia in September 2024, and the series was released on 8 February 2026.

In October 2023, it was announced that Eleven would be adapting Jeffrey Archer's best-selling Kane and Abel trilogy.

Paramount+ announced in November 2023 that it had commissioned a new original drama from Eleven, Stags. Principal photography commenced on location in Tenerife the same month. The cast includes Nico Mirallegro, Charlie Cooper, Paul Forman and Asim Chaudhry. David Kerr was announced as lead director. The series was released on 15 August 2024.

Drama / Comedy
Year	Title	Distributor
2026	Lord of the Flies	BBC One, Stan
2024	Stags	Paramount+
2023–2025	Ten Pound Poms	BBC One, Stan
2022	Red Rose	BBC Three, Netflix
2019–2023	Sex Education	Netflix
2018	True Horror	Channel 4
2016	Gap Year	E4
2015	The Enfield Haunting	Sky Living
2015	Rotters	Sky Arts
2014	Glue	E4
2013	Mr Understood	Sky Arts
2010	Rick and Peter	Channel 4
2009	Cast Offs	Channel 4

Documentary
Year	Title	Distributor
2015	The Secret Life of the Pub	Channel 4
2009	My Breasts Could Kill Me	Sky One
2008	The Murder of Billie-Jo	Channel 4
2007	Being Maxine Carr	Channel 4
2007	Cyberskiving	Channel 4
2007	Make Me A Virgin	Channel 4
2007	Getting to Gordon	BBC Newsnight
2006	Candid Cameron	BBC Newsnight
