= Better Off Dead =

Better Off Dead may refer to:

== Film and television ==
- Better Off Dead?, a 2024 BBC documentary on assisted suicide
- Better Off Dead (1985 film), a teen romantic comedy starring John Cusack
- Better Off Dead (2025 film), an Indonesian cringe comedy by Kristo Immanuel
- "Better Off Dead" (CSI), an episode of CSI
- "Better Off Dead" (Medium), an episode of Medium

== Literature ==
- Better Off Dead, a 2021 Jack Reacher novel by Lee and Andrew Child

== Music ==
=== Albums ===
- Better Off Dead (album) or the title song, by Sodom, 1990
- Better Off Dead, by Josh A & iamjakehill, 2017

=== Songs ===
- "Better Off Dead", by Bad Religion from Stranger than Fiction, 1994
- "Better Off Dead", by Bill Withers from Just as I Am, 1971
- "Better Off Dead", by Elton John from Captain Fantastic and the Brown Dirt Cowboy, 1975
- "Better Off Dead", by The Faders from Plug In + Play, 2005
- "Better Off Dead", by Golden Earring from Millbrook U.S.A., 2003
- "Better Off Dead", by Grinspoon from Easy, 1999
- "Better Off Dead", by Ice Cube from AmeriKKKa's Most Wanted, 1990
- "Better Off Dead", by Jxdn from Tell Me About Tomorrow, 2020
- "Better Off Dead", by Lostprophets from Weapons, 2012
- "Better Off Dead", by Motörhead from Snake Bite Love, 1998
- "Better Off Dead", by New Found Glory from New Found Glory, 2000
- "Better Off Dead", by Randy Newman from Bad Love, 1999
- "Better Off Dead", by Rod Stewart from Foolish Behaviour, 1980
- "Better Off Dead", by Sleeping with Sirens from Madness, 2015
- "Better Off Dead", by The Sounds from Something to Die For, 2011
- "Better Off Dead", by Wipers, 1978
- "Over My Head (Better Off Dead)", by Sum 41, 2002

== See also ==
- "You're Better Off Dead!", a song by Children of Bodom, 2002
