= Red Earth =

Red Earth may refer to:

== Music ==
- Red Earth (band), an American rock band
- Red Earth (Crash Vegas album), 1989
- Red Earth (Dee Dee Bridgewater album), 2007

== People ==
- Chi Tu, or Red Earth Kingdom, a 2nd century BC–7th century kingdom in the Malaysian peninsula
- Red Earth First Nation, a Cree First Nation band government in Saskatchewan, Canada

== Other uses ==
- Red Earth (company), an international chain of stores selling cosmetics and body care products
- Red Earth (video game), a 1996 fighting arcade game
- Red Earth Festival, a Native American cultural festival in Oklahoma City, Oklahoma

== See also ==
- Red dirt (disambiguation)
- Red clay (disambiguation)
- Red soil
