= Red dirt =

Red dirt or Red Dirt may refer to:

== Soils ==
- Red soil
- Ultisol, or red clay soil
- Latosol, or tropical red earth

== Arts and entertainment ==
- Red dirt (music), a music genre
- Red Dirt (film), a 2000 American film
- "Red Dirt" (Fear the Walking Dead), a television episode
- Red Dirt: Growing up Okie, a 1997 book by Roxanne Dunbar-Ortiz

== See also ==
- Red clay (disambiguation)
- Red mud
- Red Rock (disambiguation)
- Red Earth (disambiguation)
- Red Sand
- Red soil
