= Jamie Campbell (producer) =

English television producer and film maker

Jamie Robert Campbell (born 18 May 1977) is an English television producer and film maker.

== Early life ==
Campbell studied at Radley College and Durham University, where he read English Literature and was a member of the Durham Revue.

== Career ==
He has produced, directed, and appeared in prime time documentaries including Martha and Me (BBC Two), Osama and US (Channel 4), Come Home Gary Glitter (BBC Three), and Candid Cameron (BBC Two), in which he interviewed the future Prime Minister David Cameron over the course of a month.

In 2007, Campbell hosted his own prime time chat show for ITV1, entitled 24 Hours With. His interviewees included Bobby Brown, Steve-O, Stan Collymore, Lawrence Llewelyn Bowen, David Gest, and Lee Ryan.

He has been described as "a kind of Louis Theroux for the post-geek lady viewer."

Eleven, the television production company founded in 2006 by Campbell and Joel Wilson, has made a number of notable scripted series including Sex Education, The Enfield Haunting, Cast Offs, Gap Year and Glue.

Campbell has written cover stories for the New Statesman, and The Guardian.

== Personal life ==
On 10 September 2011 he married Amber Sainsbury on the island of Paxos in Greece.
