= Glyn Cannon =

British playwright

Glyn Cannon is a British playwright and artist.

His plays include; Coffee (Pleasance Edinburgh 2009), The Kiss (Hampstead Theatre) and Gone, a modern adaptation of Sophocles' Antigone that was first produced at the Pleasance Courtyard for the 2004 Edinburgh fringe festival. It won a Fringe First award from The Scotsman and transferred to the West End. Also, Nebuchadnezzar first produced in 2002 at the Latchmere theatre, Battersea, London, and On Blindness which was produced by Paines Plough, Graeae Theatre Company and Frantic Assembly (Soho Theatre, London, 2004). He was Associate Playwright of Paines Plough, 2003–4, and an associate artist of The Miniaturists.

== Books ==
- On Blindness (Methuen, February 2004) ISBN 0-413-77430-9
