= Mat Fraser (actor) =

English actor

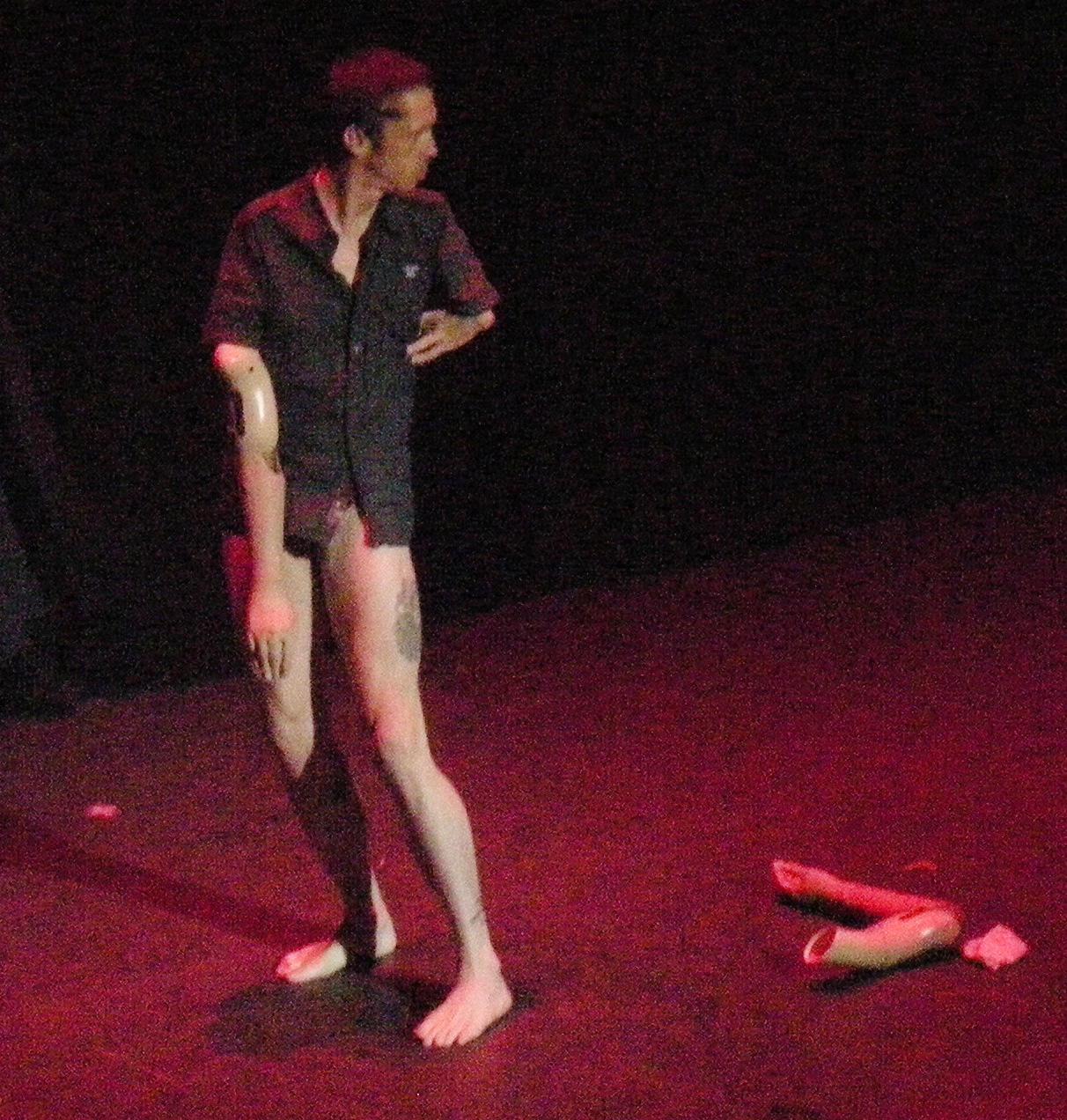
- Mat Fraser performing in 2008, removing his artificial arms
- Born: 1961 or 1962 (age 64–65); Colchester, Essex, England
- Occupations: Musician; actor
- Years active: 1980–present
- Spouse: Julie Atlas Muz (2012–present)

Mat Fraser (born 1961 or 1962) is an English rock musician, actor, writer, and performance artist. He has thalidomide-induced phocomelia.

== Early life and education ==
Mat Fraser was born in 1961 or 1962 in Colchester, Essex. He was born with a disability known as phocomelia, after his mother had taken the drug thalidomide during her pregnancy, before its side-effects had been fully realised.

== Musical career ==
Between 1980 and 1995 Fraser was a drummer with several rock bands including Fear of Sex, The Reasonable Strollers, Joyride, The Grateful Dub, and Living in Texas, who had a number one single in Italy. Fraser played the drums with Graeae Theatre Company's "Reasons to be Cheerful" at the 2012 Paralympics opening ceremony, where he also hosted the pre-televised section, and with Coldplay during the closing ceremony.

== Acting career ==
Fraser left drumming to join Graeae Theatre Company, Europe's leading disabled theatre company, after their production of Ubu inspired him to change careers. He worked in forum theatre for Graeae for several months, then landed the part of Dr Prentice in Joe Orton's What the Butler Saw. He is now a patron of Graeae. Subsequent theatre roles in the 1990s included the Group K production of Marisol and the title role in Johnny Sol at the Croydon Warehouse.

His first major television role was in ITV's 1998 three-part World War II drama series Unknown Soldier (ITV, 1998).

In 2003 he appeared as the seer Calchas in the television miniseries Helen of Troy based on Homer's Iliad. In 2009 he appeared in Channel Four's Cast Offs, a six-part comedy-drama series satirising reality television. Fraser has been associated with the use of the term "spacking up" to describe when a non-disabled actor plays the part of a disabled person rather than the part going to a disabled actor, as a play on "blacking up", used to describe the controversial practice where non-black actors take on the characters of black people. The term was actually coined by one of the show's writers, in the line "spacking up is the new blacking up".

Fraser has appeared on television in a number of other productions, including Metrosexuality and Every Time You Look at Me (2004).

He wrote 2005's Thalidomide!! A Musical, in which he and Anna Winslet played all the roles. After leading in Lou Birks's short film "Stubborn & Spite", written for him in 2009, he released his own film Kung Fu Flid starring Faye Tozer (formerly of pop group Steps), Frank Harper, and Terry Stone.

Fraser appeared in the RTÉ One soap opera Fair City in June 2011, playing Esther's son David.

In 2012 he appeared in Kaite O'Reilly's stage play In Water I'm Weightless as part of the 2012 Cultural Olympiad.

Fraser was one of the regular cast members in the fourth season of the US TV series American Horror Story: Freak Show.

For three seasons, from 2017 to 2020, Fraser played the character Roger Frostly on the American comedy-drama television series Loudermilk.

In May 2017, Fraser was cast as Shakespeare's King Richard III, "a disabled guy gets cast as a disabled guy", a role he discussed with Emma Tracey, presenter for BBC Radio's service for disabled people, "Ouch".

In 2019, Fraser played Raymond Van Geritt in the BBC One adaptation of Philip Pullman's fantasy trilogy His Dark Materials. In 2020, Fraser wrote and curated the BBC Four disability series Criptales. Also in 2020, he played Jim Bell in episodes 1 and 2 of series 23 of Silent Witness. In 2023 he played a minor role as the hospital administrator, Steve, in ITV's Maternal.

Also in 2023, Fraser appeared in Sister Boniface Mysteries in series 2, episodes 5 and 10, as Clement Rugg.

In 2024, Fraser played the role of Daedalus in the Netflix series Kaos, a modern comedic adaptation of Greek mythology.

== Television presenting ==
Fraser was one of the original co-hosts of the BBC's Ouch! Podcast. He presented the short-lived Channel 4 series Freak Out. He presented the 2004 Channel 4 documentary Happy Birthday Thalidomide, documenting how the drug was being used in Brazil to treat leprosy, but that its use in a country with low levels of literacy and a black market in drugs was leading to new thalidomide births.

== Radio ==
Fraser played the lead character, Sparky, in BBC Radio Four's Saturday Playhouse production "Inmates" (1997), by Allan Sutherland and Stuart Morris.

He was a regular performer on the BBC Radio Four sketch show "Yes Sir, I Can Boogie".

== CDs ==
Fraser has released two rap albums:

- "Survival of the Shittest"
- "Genetically Modified...Just For You" (2000)

== Freak shows ==
Fraser has shown a continuing interest in freak shows.

His 2001 play Sealboy: Freak draws on the life history of Stanislaus Berent, a sideshow performer with naturally occurring phocomelia who worked under the stage name Sealo.

Fraser's 2002 television documentary, Born Freak, looked at this historical tradition and its relevance to modern disabled performers. This work has become the subject of academic analysis in the field of disability studies.

As part of the documentary, Fraser performed in a Coney Island freak show. He was invited to return to work there professionally and has since worked several summer seasons there.

Fraser's 2011 show, From Freak to Clique, charted the history of portrayals of disability, including freak show performers.

In 2014, Fraser went on to have a role as Paul the Illustrated Seal in American Horror Story: Freak Show.

== "Cabinet of Curiosities" ==
Fraser was commissioned by the Research Centre for Museums and Galleries at the University of Leicester to create a new artistic work, shaped out of a collaborative engagement with museum collections, research and expertise in medical history, museums and disability. The resulting performance, "Cabinet of Curiosities: How disability was kept in a box" was performed at the Thackray Medical Museum, Leeds; the Silk Mill Museum, Derby; and Manchester Museum. It won the Observer Ethical Awards, Arts and Culture 2014.

The Guardian's Lyn Gardner stated that, "by making a spectacle of himself, Fraser is not only raising the spectre of the Victorian freak show but also subverting it by questioning what is exhibited and what isn't, and making us confront what we are shown and what we are not shown, both in art and in life".

== American pantomime ==
On 6 December 2017 Fraser and his wife Julie Atlas Muz presented Jack and the Beanstalk, the first large-scale pantomime to be presented in New York for over a century, at the Playhouse Theatre of the Henry Street Settlement. The production closed on 23 December 2017 and enjoyed a revival the following year at the same theatre, running for three weeks during the 2018 holiday season.

On 4 December 2021 a follow-up, Dick Rivington and The Cat, adapted from the traditional pantomime story of Dick Whittington, was presented by the pair.

== Personal life ==
Fraser married Julie Atlas Muz, an American neo-burlesque star, in May 2012 in New York City.

== Filmography ==
=== Film ===
Year	Title	Role(s)	Notes
2008	Stubborn & Spite	John	Short film
2008	Resistance	Thomas	Short film
2008	Chemical Wedding	Anton Le Fay	
2009	Unarmed but Dangerous	Jimmy Loveit	
2011	Inbred	Jacob	
2016	The Cruel Tale of the Medicine Man	Sealboy	
2022	Poison Arrows	Tony Talone	

=== Television ===
Year	Title	Role(s)	Notes
2001	Metrosexuality	Marlon Gittar	6 episodes
2003	Helen of Troy	Calchas	Two-parts miniseries
2004	Everytime You Look at Me	Chris	Television film
2009	Holby City	Gary Davids	Episode: "Reformation"
2009	Cast Offs	Will	6 episodes
2011	The Fades	Shopkeeper	Episode: "Episode 1"
2014–2015	American Horror Story: Freak Show	Paul the Illustrated Seal	13 episodes
2017–2020	Loudermilk	Roger Frostly	25 episodes
2018	Kiri	Sam	Episode: "Episode 2"
2019	Traitors	Andrew	Episode: "Priscilla"
2019	His Dark Materials	Raymond Van Gerritt	5 episodes
2020	Silent Witness	Jim Bell	Episodes: "Deadhead: Part 1 & 2"
2022	Then Barbara Met Alan	Mat	Television film
2023	Maternal	Steve	Episode: "Episode 1"
2023	The Mandalorian	Pirate Coxswain	Episodes: "Chapter 17: The Apostate" and "Chapter 21: The Pirate"
2023	Sister Boniface Mysteries	Clement Rugg	Episodes: "The Book of Shadows" and "The Good Samaritan"
2023	The Full Monty	Big Bill	3 episodes
2023	Best Interests	Greg	Episodes: "Episode 3 & 4"
2024	Kaos	Daedalus	3 episodes
2025	Gangs of London	Ray	Episode: "Episode 7"
2026	American Horror Story: 13	Paul the Illustrated Seal	Episode: "Is That All There Is?"
