= Cast Offs =

2009 British television series

- Cast promotional photo
- Genre: Comedy drama Mockumentary
- Created by: Tony Roche; Jack Thorne; Alex Bulmer; Jamie Campbell; Joel Wilson; Alison Walsh
- Starring: Mat Fraser; Sophie Woolley; Kiruna Stamell; Peter Mitchell; Tim Gebbels; Victoria Wright
- Opening theme: Heavy Load
- Country of origin: United Kingdom
- Original language: English
- No. of series: 1
- No. of episodes: 6

Production
- Executive producer: Judy Counihan
- Camera setup: Single-camera
- Running time: approx. 60 minutes
- Production company: Eleven Film

Original release
- Network: Channel 4
- Release: 24 November – 9 December 2009

Cast Offs is a BAFTA-nominated comedy-drama mockumentary that follows a group of six disabled people sent to a remote British Island for a fictional reality show.

The series is made up of six episodes, with each episode concentrating on one of the six characters. It follows each character for the year leading up to them being dropped off on the island (other than Carrie's episode, which followed her time after she left the island) and also the happenings on the island when they are left to fend for themselves.

== Characters ==
- Dan (Peter Mitchell), sportsman, 26 years old, paraplegic
- Tom (Tim Gebbels), actor, 39 years old, blind
- Will (Mat Fraser), political activist, 46 years old, thalidomide-affected
- Gabriella (Sophie Woolley), mother-to-be, 32 years old, deaf
- April (Victoria Wright), research scientist, 34 years old, cherubism
- Carrie (Kiruna Stamell), unemployed, 29 years old, dwarfism
