= Gap Year (TV series) =

2017 British comedy-drama TV series

- Also known as: Foreign Bodies
- Genre: Comedy drama
- Created by: Tom Basden; Jamie Campbell; Joel Wilson
- Written by: Tom Basden
- Starring: Ade Oyefeso; Anders Hayward; Tim Key; Alice Lee; Brittney Wilson
- Opening theme: "Jungle Drum" by Emilíana Torrini
- Composer: Oli Julian
- Country of origin: United Kingdom
- Original language: English
- No. of series: 1
- No. of episodes: 8

Production
- Executive producers: Tom Basden; Jamie Campbell; Joel Wilson
- Producer: Tim Whitby
- Cinematography: Simon Bell; Oli Russell; Jamie Hicks; Rob Kitzmann
- Editors: Matthew Tabern; Gary Dollner; Jo Walker; Adam Bokey
- Running time: 40–45 minutes
- Production companies: Eleven Film; Entertainment One; Ingenious Media

Original release
- Network: E4
- Release: 23 February – 13 April 2017

Gap Year is a British comedy-drama series that premiered on E4 on 23 February 2017. It follows the adventures of a group of backpackers taking a trip through Asia. The series was created by Tom Basden, Jamie Campbell and Joel Wilson, and stars Ade Oyefeso, Anders Hayward, Tim Key, Alice Lee and Brittney Wilson. After eight episodes, the series concluded on 13 April 2017. In September 2017, the network decided not to renew the show for a second series.

== Premise ==
Gap Year begins with best mates Dylan (Anders Hayward) and Sean (Ade Oyefeso) who set out to backpack through China after Dylan's split from girlfriend Lauren (Rachel Redford), but they end up travelling the whole continent of Asia after meeting Ashley (Brittney Wilson), Greg (Tim Key) and May (Alice Lee).

== Cast and characters ==
=== Main ===
- Ade Oyefeso as Sean, who quit his plumbing job to go on a trip to China with his best friend, Dylan.
- Anders Hayward as Dylan, a University student who is trying to get over his ex-girlfriend Lauren.
- Tim Key as Greg, an older wannabe businessman attempting to prove his ex-partner, Daisy, wrong. Greg joined May and Ashley after they shared a raft to cut costs.
- Alice Lee as May, who visits China to meet her mother's family, accompanied by near-stranger Ashley at her mother's insistence of her not going alone.
- Brittney Wilson as Ashley, whose university scholarship is in jeopardy, accompanies May in spite of them not knowing each other well prior to the trip.

=== Recurring / Guest stars ===
- Janeane Garofalo as Sam, a travel advisor whom Sean and Dylan meet on the flight to China.
- Aisling Bea and Trystan Gravelle as Kendra and Eugene, a married couple traveling through China.
- Rachel Redford as Lauren, Dylan's ex-girlfriend.
- Jamie Demetriou as Norm, current boyfriend of Lauren.
- Scott Adsit as Todd, who runs the Vietnam orphanage.
- Amelia Dowd as Dana, a novice stand-in tour guide in Malaysia who falls in love with Sean.
- Camille Chamoux as Genevieve, French backpacker with cancer who befriends Ashley in Malaysia.
- Daniel Rigby as Jotty, long time friend of Greg, now a successful businessman in Kuala Lumpur.
- Robert Bathurst as Bertie, friend of Jotty.
- Kelly Hu as Vanessa, May's mother.

== Episodes ==
No.	Title	Directed by	Written by	Original release date
1	"China - The Wall"	Jonathan van Tulleken	Tom Basden	23 February 2017
Dylan and Sean begin their journey in China, Sean thinks they are on a vacation to escape life back in the UK but it's soon revealed that Dylan has booked the whole thing to get back with his ex-girlfriend, Lauren. Before setting off to find Lauren, they meet Ashley, Greg and May in toilets in Beijing. Dylan leaves his and Sean's money behind, which Greg finds. Ashley, Greg and May initially take the money and begin spending it before unexpectedly reuniting with Dylan and Sean to return the money. They join together and head to a festival at the Great Wall of China. A fracas ensues, Sean gets split from the group and, seemingly, kidnapped.
2	"China - The Wedding"	Jonathan van Tulleken	Tom Basden	2 March 2017
The group head off to May's family wedding in Hangzhou without Sean, who has to make his own way there. He escapes from a local club, after being driven there for karaoke and not being kidnapped, and hitches a lift off of Eugene and Kendra. On the way, he is almost tricked into a threesome with Eugene and Kendra before stealing their car and heading for Hangzhou. At the wedding, May is shunned to the side as Ashley is the centre of attention. After becoming frustrated by her mother's family, May cuts ties with them at the dismay of her mother. Dylan and Sean find themselves in a love triangle with Ashley.
3	"Vietnam - The Orphanage"	Natalie Bailey	James Wood and Tom Basden	9 March 2017
After the wedding in China, the group decide to move on into Vietnam to volunteer at a local orphanage. Ashley and May, expecting to be working with the children, are forced into manual labour by the Orphanage's owner Todd. Greg gets close with a nurse, before being stopped by a fear of contracting leprosy. Meanwhile, Dylan and Sean go to a nearby hotel and trick their way into a free stay after using trip advisor Sam's business card. After Sean sends Dylan to hospital after injuring him during a basketball game, Dylan and Ashley end up having sex at the hospital.
4	"Thailand - The Full Moon"	Jonathan van Tulleken	Charlie Covell	16 March 2017
Episode 4 sees them go to Thailand as Greg aims to take the group to the famous Full Moon Party. However, Lauren makes a shock appearance and reclaims her love for Dylan after splitting from Norm. Dylan gets back with Lauren, enraging Ashley in the process. Lauren convinces the group to head to a different party, rather than Greg's preferred choice. Ahead of the party, they all buy local drugs. May, not wanting to take the drugs, fakes a stomach bug to get out of the party. Ashley, with a demanding May on call, drugs May to allow her to attend the party. Upon their return, May was robbed and her and Ashley's friendship takes a turn for the worse. Meanwhile, at the party, Lauren's choice of destination turns out to be a damp squib so the group end up splitting for the night, including Greg who makes a late dash to the Full Moon Party.
5	"Malaysia - The Trek"	Natalie Bailey	Tom Basden	23 March 2017
Lauren signs them up to go on a trek through a Malaysian jungle with stand-in tour guide Dana and fellow trekker Genevieve, who suffers from cancer. Ashley starts to blackmail Dylan, threatening to tell Lauren about their night in Vietnam. During the trek, Ashley ends up revealing all, to the shock of Lauren. After an argument finishes, the group gets momentarily split up. During which time all but the separated Greg (who faints after taking dodgy tablets), Sean and Dana begin to slut-shame Ashley for sleeping with Dylan, before Genevieve steps in to protect Ashley and subsequently befriends her. After getting back together, the group members realise they are lost, without any way of reaching base. While waiting to be rescued, Sean and Dana have sex, Ashley attempts to shoot Dylan with a dart, Genevieve passes away and Dylan leaves Lauren.
6	"Kuala Lumpur - The Expats"	Rebecca Rycroft	Jonny Sweet (story by: Jonny Sweet and Tim Key)	30 March 2017
Greg takes the group to Kuala Lumpur, where they meet his old friend Jotty, now a successful businessman. After enjoying Jotty's hospitality, Ashley, Greg and May get jobs working with Jotty and his friend Bertie but it is not as it seems as they soon find themselves at odds with Jotty and Bertie. After a string of incidents, Greg ends up standing up to Jotty before being hampered with a hefty bill for the group's stay. Not able to pay the bill, the group urges Greg into a game of squash with Jotty, with the winner paying the bill. Greg wins. Meanwhile, Ashley's university scholarship is terminated.
7	"Penang - The Shoot"	Natalie Bailey	Loren Mclaughlan and Amy Roberts	6 April 2017
The group decide to sign up to play extras in a Malaysian zombie film. Sean, wanting to get close to Ashley, asks Dylan to test the waters to see if she's into him. Dylan, in the process of finding out, ends up trying to make a second move on Ashley, this time she stops him. Sean finds out about Dylan's attempt and ends up punching him, prior to the group being sacked by the filmmakers. With the group almost set to go home, Dylan goes missing after his coming together with Sean so the group try to find him. After previous talks about Nepal, they decide to head there.
8	"Nepal - The End"	Jonathan van Tulleken	Tom Basden and Sam Leifer	13 April 2017
The group head to Nepal to find Dylan. In Nepal, Dylan finds a now redundant Sam and joins her in a visit to a Buddhist Monastery. Sam finds out that it was Dylan who used her business card in Vietnam and cost her her job. However, she doesn't tell Dylan she knows and sends him on a fake and pointless trip to righteousness. After entering the country, Ashley, Greg, May and Sean go in search of Dylan, with no luck they run into May's mother who has been stalking May via the internet back home. Using May's mother's stalking tactics, they find out Dylan's location at the monastery. After a failed attempt to reunite with Dylan, they head back to the city where Ashley and Sean make their feelings know to each other. After Ashley books a return home for her scholarship appeal, the two attempt to dry-hump outside a city temple but are interrupted by the police and duly arrested. Greg finds out and travels, via rickshaw, to tell Dylan about their imprisonment. Dylan attempts to rescue the pair by pretending to be the UK ambassador but gets himself imprisoned. The three are eventually rescued by Sam, who convinces a monk to let them go. Despite this, Ashley (with May) and Sean (with Dylan) are deported back to the United States and the United Kingdom respectively. Greg ends up going travelling with May's mother.

Channel 4
IMDb

== Broadcast ==
It was shown on E4 in the UK for original release. Internationally, it was broadcast on Super Channel in Canada from 14 September 2017. The series is also accessible on Hulu.
