= Glue (TV series) =

British television series

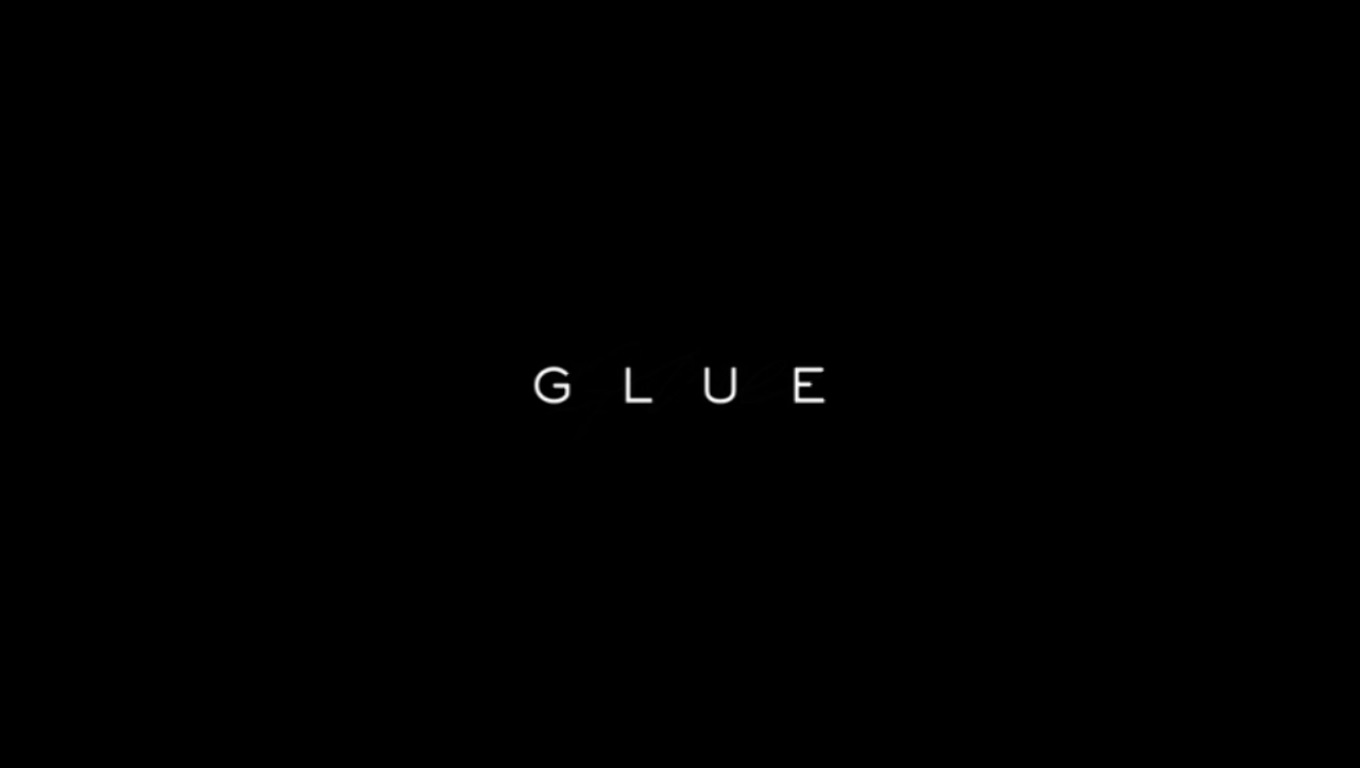
- Genre: Teen drama Murder mystery
- Created by: Jack Thorne
- Written by: Jack Thorne; Laura Lomas; E.V. Crowe; John Donnelly; Kieran Prendiville
- Directed by: Daniel Nettheim; Olly Blackburn; Cathy Brady
- Starring: Yasmin Paige; Jordan Stephens; Billy Howle; Charlotte Spencer; Jessie Cave; Callum Turner; Faye Marsay; Tommy Knight
- Theme music composer: Walter Mair
- Country of origin: United Kingdom
- Original language: English
- No. of seasons: 1
- No. of episodes: 8

Production
- Executive producers: Jamie Campbell; Jack Thorne
- Producer: Joel Wilson
- Production locations: Hungerford, England, United Kingdom
- Running time: 60 minutes
- Production company: Eleven Film

Original release
- Network: E4
- Release: 15 September – 3 November 2014

Glue is a British television drama series on E4. It was created and written by Jack Thorne. It began broadcasting from 15 September to 3 November 2014 and comprises eight episodes. The plot revolves around the friends of a 14-year-old boy, Cal Bray, who is found dead. The investigation to find the killer reveals their dark and dirty secrets, hidden behind the picture-perfect British countryside.

== Production ==
The cast was announced on 2 April 2014 and filming took place in Hungerford, England.

== Cast ==
Main characters

- Yasmin Paige as Ruth Rosen
- Jordan Stephens as Rob Kendle
- Billy Howle as James Warwick
- Charlotte Spencer as Tina Fallon
- Jessie Cave as Annie Maddocks
- Callum Turner as Eli Bray
- Faye Marsay as Janine Riley/Elizabeth Marshall
- Tommy Knight as Caleb "Cal" Bray
- Tommy McDonnell as Dominic Richards

Other characters

- Kerry Fox as Jackie Warwick
- Adrian Rawlins as DCI Simson
- Griffin Stevens as Ian Salter
- Christine Tremarco as Nadya Rosen
- Kierston Wareing as Joyce Fallon
- Tony Hirst as Simon Kendle
- Victoria Wicks as Susanna Marshall
- Phoebe Waller-Bridge as Bee Warwick
- Hana Luheshi as Marah
- Ben Pettengell as Benji
- Dean-Charles Chapman as Chris
- Sofia de Azevedo and Sienna de Azevedo as baby Cassie

== Episodes ==
No. in season	Title	Directed by	Written by	Original release date	UK viewers
1	"Everyone"	Daniel Nettheim	Jack Thorne	15 September 2014	737,000
In the rural village of Overton, a group of young friends (Annie Maddocks, Janine Riley, Rob Kendle, James Warwick, Caleb 'Cal' Bray and Tina Fallon) take drugs and participate in dares in a grain silo. The next morning, Cal, a Romany Gypsy, is found dead underneath the wheels of a tractor by James. Throughout the day, the group are alerted to his death. Cal's cause of death is found to be asphyxiation, due to being drowned in mud. Ruth Rosen, a police trainee, assists DCI Simson in the search for Cal's brother, Eli, where she is met with suspicion at the traveller's site, and eventually convinces him to let her join the investigation. Tina's boyfriend Rob is being sent videos and messages after a secret one-night-stand with mutual friend, Janine. In the evening, the group meet at the local pub. Janine mentions that they might be interviewed; in turn they all agree not to mention that they'd been taking drugs with Cal that night. Afterwards, Tina and Rob joyride and torch a car, with help from Janine and Annie, as a funeral pyre for Cal. James is revealed to have a necklace that is similar to Cal's in his pocket.
2	"James/Janine"	Daniel Nettheim	Jack Thorne	22 September 2014	216,000
The police interview Cal's friends about the night they last saw him. Nobody mentions the use of drugs. It is James' 18th birthday and his sister Bee arrives, though he is no mood to celebrate. Ruth and the police search Cal's caravan, and find traces of ketamine; other members of the police believe he must have been dealing. Meanwhile, Bee reminds James of their pact - that on his 18th birthday, he would tell his mother about his acceptance to Durham University. However, he believes he should stay. Rob visits Janine at work, and asks if anyone has been following her. DCI Simson commends Ruth on her attitude to her work - that she has it in her to be decent police. Before James has the chance to tell his mother, he is kidnapped and taken to a rave that Rob has organised for his birthday. Tina finds out Janine was the last person with Cal through a voicemail Cal left her. Meanwhile, Janine is arrested after it is revealed she is an imposter, who has been making up horses at Dominic's stables to prescribe ketamine. The father of Ruth's daughter is revealed to be Tina's father. Ruth's daughter is rushed to hospital. James frantically searches for something in Cal's caravan, then sets it alight.
3	"Eli/Rob"	Olly Blackburn	Laura Lomas	29 September 2014	147,000
Janine's real name is revealed to be Elizabeth Marshall. Rob initially fails to give Elizabeth an alibi, but after seeing that his stalker has sent him an incriminating picture of him with Janine, he changes his account and she is released. Cal's father, Thomas Bray, arrives for his son's funeral. The Gypsies prevent the outsiders from Overton from attending Cal's funeral. Tempers become heated and Eli ends up fighting with his father. After the funeral, Eli tries to speak to Chris, a boy who was in care with Cal, but he runs off after the police come to question Eli. Ruth becomes suspicious of Dominic, when CCTV footage shows him arguing with Cal near a garage, hours before he died. The friends have a bonfire and let off flares to say goodbye to Cal. Ruth goes to see Janine and finds her unconscious in a pool of blood on the floor whilst a yellow car is driving away at speed.
4	"Tina/Dominic"	Olly Blackburn	Kieran Prendiville; Laura Lomas; Jack Thorne	6 October 2014	369,000
5	"James/Cal"	Olly Blackburn	E.V. Crowe	13 October 2014	277,000
6	"Rob/Tina"	Cathy Brady	Jack Thorne	20 October 2014	260,000
7	"Ruth/Eli"	Daniel Nettheim	John Donnelly; Jack Thorne	27 October 2014	437,000
8	"Everyone"	Daniel Nettheim	Jack Thorne	3 November 2014	187,000

== Reception ==
Digital Spy described Glue as being "unmissable TV" and also said "this is a whodunnit that will blow your mind". The Independent positively stated that Glue exposes the 'rotting despair of the countryside.'

It premiered in Australia on 7 July 2015 on SBS2.
