= Red soil =

Soil type

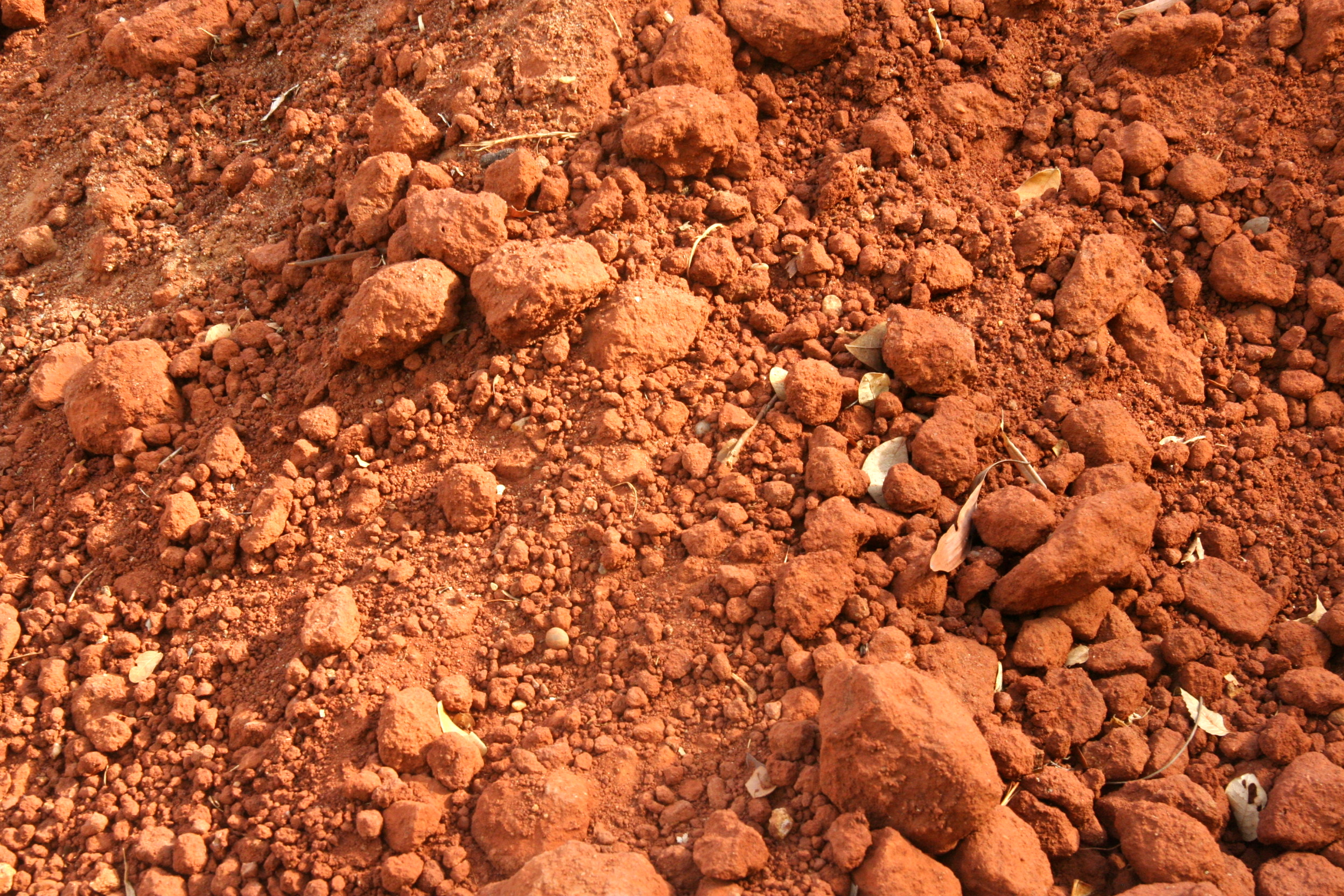
Red soil in India

Red soil is a type of soil that typically develops in warm, temperate, and humid climates and comprises approximately 13% of Earth's soil. It contains thin organic and organic-mineral layers of highly leached soil resting on a red layer of alluvium. Red soils contain large amounts of clay and are generally derived from the weathering of ancient crystalline and metamorphic rock. They are named after their rich red color, varying from reddish brown to reddish yellow due to their high iron content. Red soil can be good or poor growing soil depending on how it is managed. It is usually low in nutrients and humus and can be difficult to cultivate due to its low water holding capacity; however, the fertility of these soils can be optimized with liming and other farming techniques.

Red soils are an important resource because they make up such a large portion of farmland on the Earth, mainly in tropical, subtropical, and Mediterranean climatic zones. In countries such as China, India, and Greece, where there are large amounts of red soil, understanding the soil's properties is crucial to successful agriculture. Red soil properties vary across regions and may require different management practices to achieve the best results.

== Characteristics ==
Red soils include multiple soil types (e.g. ultisols, alfisols, oxisols) that are classified as red soil when they develop a distinct reddish color, which can vary from reddish brown to reddish yellow due to their high iron content. In general, red soils possess some characteristics of a good growing soil. They are generally acidic soils, which to some extent can be positive for agriculture but, in this case, often cause a lack of sufficient nutrients. These soils are also prone to frequent drought in drier regions.

== Composition ==
Red soils are generally derived from the weathering of crystalline and metamorphic rock in areas of high rainfall. Red soil contains large amounts of clay and thin organic and organic-mineral layers of highly leached soil resting on an alluvium red layer. The composition and agricultural properties of red soil vary across regions. One type of red soil may be considered infertile in one region but nutrient-rich in another. There is not a singular composition that classifies all red soils.

== Soil fertility and management practices ==
Red soils are typically difficult for crop cultivation because high leaching leads to low water holding capacity, low nutrients, low organic matter (humus), and acidification. Fluctuations in the concentration of iron within red soil are found to have significant implications on its fertility and growth properties. The fertility of red soils can be improved with various farming techniques.

=== Liming ===
The soil liming process helps raise the pH of acidic soils. Because red soils are generally acidic, liming is a valuable farming technique that allows crops intolerant of acidic environments to thrive in red soil. However, liming may have long-term environmental consequences on the soil, the stimulation of microbial activity decreasing the soil organic matter content, which may negatively affect the soil structure.

=== Nutrient application ===
Red soils are often deficient in nitrogen due to local rainfall patterns (e.g. intense leaching of nitrates), soil erosion, which limits their growth properties in the absence of fertiization. Phosphorus and potassium can also become limited after the land has been harvested repeatedly. Nutrient application techniques introduce more of these lacking nutrients to the soil and allow them to restore chemicals that have diminished over time.

=== Organic matter ===
Another management practice that can be used to improve the fertility of red soil is incorporating organic matter into the soil. Some strategies employed to practice this include the use of organic manure and establishing proper tillage systems for the land.

=== Crop rotation ===
Crop rotation is a highly effective practice for addressing several common challenges in red soil. It works by increasing the soil's organic matter content, which enhances its fertility and water retention capabilities. It also minimizes the nitrogen deficiency, as different crops utilize and replenish nutrients in varying ways. Furthermore, it helps in controlling pest populations by breaking the life cycles of pests that are specific to certain crops.

== Geography of red soil ==
=== Canada ===
Prince Edward Island is famous for its iron-rich red soil. The eastern part of Prince County and the central part of Queens County display fertile 3 yr-rotated agricultural soils with potato, grain, and forage as main crops. Due to agricultural intensification, declines in soil organic matter have been registered from 1998 to 2015, stemming in lower soil fertility.

=== China ===
Red soil resources are estimated to cover 102 million hectare (1,020,000 square kilometers) of land in tropical and subtropical regions of China. The primary areas of distribution are Hainan, Guangdong, and Yunnan among other agricultural regions.

=== Greece ===
Red soils have a significant role in agriculture in Greece as well. They fall into two groups: residual soil forming in place from parent rock and soil forming in deep sedimentary deposits. The residual red soils in Greece tend to be less than a meter in depth and form on sloping hillsides. Like other red soils in the Mediterranean, they tend to form in limestone. The red soils that form in deep sediments are widespread in the lowlands of Greece, occurring on gently sloping terrain. Taxonomically, the Greek red soils belong to Rhodoxeralfs (red alfisol), Palexeralfs (well-aged alfisol), Xerochrepts (xeric inceptisol), and Orthents.

=== India ===
Red soils denote the most extensive soil group of India, covering an area of about 350,000 km^{2} (10.6% of India's area) across the peninsula. India is rich with red soils in their southern, eastern, and northern regions. There, the soil appears yellow in its hydrated form. These soils, also known ironically as the omnibus group due to its varied localized names and characteristics, have been developed over ancient crystalline and metamorphic rocks of the Pre-Cambrian shield, specifically granites, gneisses, and quartzites, typically evolving under conditions of low to moderate rainfall. Geographically, they dominate the vast eastern and southern tracts of the Deccan Plateau. Their distribution spans large tracts of Tamil Nadu, Karnataka, southern Maharashtra, Telangana, Andhra Pradesh, Chhattisgarh, Odisha, the Chota Nagpur plateau of Jharkhand, and the piedmont zones flanking the Western Ghats. In the uplands of India, the red soils are thin, poor and gravelly, sandy, or stony and porous, light-colored soils on which only highly tolerant food crops like bajra can be grown. In contrast, on the lower plains and valleys, they are rich, deep, dark-colored fertile loam which, under irrigation, can produce excellent crops like cotton, wheat, pulses, tobacco, jowar, linseed, millet, potatoes and fruits.

== See also ==
- Ultisol, or red clay soil
- Latosol, or tropical red earth
- Inceptisol, a soil order
- Red clay (disambiguation)
- Red dirt (disambiguation)
- Red Earth (disambiguation)
