= Peter Mitchell (footballer) =

Northern Irish footballer and actor

Peter Mitchell is a Northern Irish former professional footballer who played as a full back for Leeds Utd. He is also a former Ireland international wheelchair basketball player, actor and motivational speaker.

== Career ==
=== Leeds United ===
Born and raised in Limavady, Northern Ireland, Mitchell came to England as a 16 year old to play for Leeds United who were, at the time, managed by David O'Leary and had a reputation for bringing through Irish players. Mitchell had been playing youth football for Institute when he signed for Leeds.

=== Accident ===
On 21 July 2002, Mitchell was a passenger in the back of a Leeds Utd teammate's car which crashed and flipped off the road, rendering him a paraplegic.

== Post Playing Career ==
While Mitchell was in hospital he was visited by a member of the Knights wheelchair basketball team who persuaded him to take up the game and, in 2004, he represented Ireland at the European Championships.

Whilst playing for the Knights he was contacted about an acting opportunity which resulted in him starring in the Channel 4 mockumentary series Cast Offs. Mitchell admitted that he had never intended to pursue an acting career and "wasn't even in a school play" but nevertheless was cast, in 2011, as Pete Hamill in the soap Hollyoaks and in 2015 he appeared in Coronation Street.

Mitchell now tells his story, particularly to young footballers, as a motivational speaker
