= The Silence (TV series) =

2010 British television series

- Genre: Crime drama; Thriller
- Written by: Fiona Seres
- Directed by: Dearbhla Walsh
- Starring: Genevieve Barr; Gina McKee; Hugh Bonneville; Douglas Henshall; Dervla Kirwan; Harry Ferrier; Tom Kane; Rebecca Oldfield
- Theme music composer: John Lunn
- Country of origin: England
- Original language: English
- No. of series: 1
- No. of episodes: 4

Production
- Executive producers: George Faber; Charles Pattinson
- Producer: Eleanor Greene
- Production location: Bristol
- Cinematography: Dublin
- Editors: Ben Yeates; Úna Ní Dhonghaíle
- Running time: 60 minutes
- Production company: Company Pictures

Original release
- Network: BBC One
- Release: 12 July – 15 July 2010

The Silence is a British television crime drama, first broadcast on BBC One in 2010, which follows the story of a young deaf girl who witnesses a murder. The series was broadcast between 12–15 July 2010. The drama stars deaf actress Genevieve Barr in her first major role following her successful screen debut in Channel 4's The Amazing Dermot, alongside Dervla Kirwan, Gina McKee, Hugh Bonneville and Douglas Henshall. The series was also directed by Dearbhla Walsh. The series, produced by Company Pictures, was filmed in Dublin, but set in Bristol.

== Plot ==
The Silence is set in and around Bristol, south-western England. The plot centres on Amelia, portrayed by Genevieve Barr, an eighteen-year-old struggling to integrate into a hearing world following cochlear implantation, who witnesses the murder of a police officer. The subsequent investigation unravels a net of police corruption.

DCI Jim Edwards (Henshall) is investigating a gang execution. His wife Maggie (Kirwan) invites Amelia, his niece, to stay with their family for respite and to help her to hear using her recent implant. Amelia has overprotective parents, Anne and Chris (McKee and Bonneville), and relishes the chance to party with her cousins Tom, Joel and Sophie (Ferrier, Kane and Oldfield). While there, Amelia witnesses the murder of Jane Shilladay (O'Grady), a policewoman who works for the domestic violence unit and is romantically involved with colleague and amateur boxer Rocky (Campbell). By lip-reading CCTV footage, Amelia provides Edwards with a link between the two apparently unrelated murders, and recognises a member of the drug squad as one of the killers. He keeps her evidence and identity a secret in order to protect her, putting his career at risk, but their lives become endangered when he begins to unravel police corruption within the drug squad.

The Edwards family becomes victimised by the drugs squad, with Jim Edwards' wife Maggie (Kirwan) being harassed by policeman Mac (Hallett), and son Tom being framed, by Mac and Rocky, for conspiracy to deal drugs along with Ely (Nevern), Sophie's boyfriend.

== Cast ==
- Genevieve Barr — Amelia Edwards
- Gina McKee — Anne Edwards
- Hugh Bonneville — Chris Edwards
- Douglas Henshall — DCI Jim Edwards
- Dervla Kirwan — Maggie Edwards
- Harry Ferrier — Tom Edwards
- Tom Kane — Joel Edwards
- Rebecca Oldfield — Sophie Edwards
- Rod Hallett — DCI Peter MacKinnon
- Mark Stobbart — DI Lee Grigson
- Richie Campbell — DS Rocky Smith
- Del Synnott — DI Terry Johns
- David Westhead — Superintendent Frank Evans
- Eimear O'Grady — Jane Shilladay
- Jody Latham — Gary Roach
- Laura Way — Robyn Seabold
- Nick Nevern — Ely
- Shazad Latif — Yousef
- Rebecca Dunne — Issy
- Catriona Martin — Paula
- Lara Steward — Maxine
- Emmet Kirwan — Custody Officer
- Catherine Walker as Professional Standards Investigator Sarah Cassidy
