= Red clay (disambiguation) =

Red clay, or Ultisol, is a type of soil.

Red clay or Red Clay may also refer to:

== Soils ==
- Hong ni (Chinese: 红泥), a clay used in Chinese pottery
- Pelagic red clay, a type of deepwater sediment

== Places ==
- Red Clay, Georgia, an unincorporated community
- Red Clay Consolidated School District, a public school district in northern New Castle County, Delaware
- Red Clay Creek, a tributary of White Clay Creek
- Red Clay State Historic Park, in Tennessee

== Other uses ==
- Red Clay, a 1970 album by Freddie Hubbard
- Red Clay (film), a 1927 American silent film
- Red clay, a type of clay court in tennis
- Red Clay (novel), a 2025 American novel by Charles B. Fancher

== See also ==
- Red dirt (disambiguation)
- Red Earth (disambiguation)
- Red soil
