= Underlying Health Condition =

Disability advocate group

Underlying Health Condition (UHC) is a collective movement for change in the UK television industry, founded by Jack Thorne, Genevieve Barr, Katie Player and Holly Lubran.

They are collective of disabled and non-disabled on and off screen creatives & technical crew currently working within the television industry. They champion the Social model of disability.

In August 2021 Thorne announced the creation of the pressure group during his MacTaggart Lecture at the Edinburgh International Television Festival. During the lecture, Thorne called television an "empathy box," but said that "TV has failed disabled people. Utterly and totally."

In December 2021 on the United Nations' International Day of Persons with Disabilities, the collective published a report entitled 'Everybody Forgot About The Toilets', written in collaboration with the Creative Diversity Network, TripleC, the Disabled Artists Networking Community (DANC), Deaf and Disabled People in TV (DDPTV) and the 1in4 Coalition, gaining international coverage from screen industries globally.

Underlying Health Condition surveyed 72 television studios and facilities providers across the UK over a period of 6 months. Only 45.85% of those contacted responded, and during the launch of 'Everybody Forgot About The Toilets,' UHC revealed their findings, including the discovery that there was only 1 fully accessible honeywagon available to hire in the whole of the UK as well as their recommendations for change, which include introducing a line in every High End Television (HETV) Budget for Reasonable Adjustments, the creation of a Disabled Freelancers Fund, training and hiring Accessibility Coordinators, and the creation of a Studios and Facilities Fund. Channel 4 are the first major UK broadcaster to commit to issuing UHC's recommended 'industry-first' guidelines, and in March 2022 ScreenSkills announced they would be training 12 Accessibility Coordinators by the end of the year.

UHC are part of the Coalition for Change, alongside the BBC, Channel 4, ITV, Sky UK, ViacomCBS, STV, Creative England, The Film and Television Charity, UKTV, the Broadcasting, Entertainment, Communications and Theatre Union (BECTU), Directors UK, WFTV Awards, Viva La PD, The TV Collective, The Unit List, PACT and Share My Telly Job.

In August 2022, 9 of the UK's biggest broadcasters, the BBC, Channel 4, Paramount Pictures, Amazon Studios, BritBox, ITV, Sky, UKTV and Disney +, joined UHC, DANC, DDPTV, CDN and the Producers Alliance for Cinema and Television in launching the TV Access Project at the Edinburgh International Television Festival. "The flagship cross-industry initiative," said Max Goldbart in Deadline Hollywood, is "a blueprint to rid the sector of appalling accessibility problems," led by BBC Chief Content Officer Charlotte Moore. TAP makes clear that studios and facilities providers who meet their guidelines will be prioritised by the member broadcasters when considering new UK commissions.
