= Criptales =

Disability television drama

- Genre: Comedy drama
- Written by: Mat Fraser; Jack Thorne; Genevieve Barr; Jackie Hagan; Tom Wentworth; Matilda Ibini
- Directed by: Ewan Marshall; Amit Sharma; Jenny Sealey
- Starring: Ruth Madeley; Liz Carr; Carly Houston; Jackie Hagan; Robert Softley Gale; Mat Fraser
- Country of origin: United Kingdom
- Original language: English
- No. of episodes: 6

Production
- Executive producer: Debbie Christie
- Running time: 15 minutes

Original release
- Network: BBC Four; BBC America
- Release: 1 October – 5 November 2020

Criptales is a 2020 British comedy-drama series, consisting of monologues, based on factual research and the experiences of British disabled people, since 1970. These were curated by disabled actor-writer Mat Fraser, with each episode written and performed by disabled artists.

== Cast ==
- Liz Carr as Meg
- Ruth Madeley as Sue
- Carly Houston as Annette
- Jackie Hagan as Stacy Hadfield
- Robert Softley Gale as Hamish
- Mat Fraser as himself

== Episodes ==
No.	Title	Directed by	Written by	Original release date
1	"Audition"	Ewan Marshall	Mat Fraser	1 October 2020
2	"The Real Deal"	Ewan Marshall	Tom Wentworth	1 October 2020
3	"Thunderbox"	Amit Sharma	Genevieve Barr	4 November 2020
4	"Hamish"	Amit Sharma	Jack Thorne	4 November 2020
5	"Paper Knickers"	Ewan Marshall	Jackie Hagan	5 November 2020
6	"The Shed"	Jenny Sealey	Matilda Ibini	5 November 2020

== Nominations ==
Criptales was nominated for a BAFTA award for 'Short-form programme'.
