= Rachel Redford =

Welsh actress

- Born: Rachel Leonie Ford; 1990/1991
- Education: RADA
- Years active: 2013–present

Rachel Leonie Ford (born 1990/1991), known professionally as Rachel Redford, is a Welsh actress. She is best known for her theatre work.

== Early life ==
Redford is from Penarth in the Vale of Glamorgan. Her mother Jennifer Lewis is also an actress and briefly appeared in Pobol y Cwm. Redford attended Stanwell School. She graduated with a Bachelor of Arts in Acting from the Royal Academy of Dramatic Art (RADA) in 2013.

== Career ==
After graduating from RADA, Redford began her career in Welsh theatre productions, starring in the 2013 Cardiff productions of It's A Family Affair at the Sherman Theatre as Lipochka and Parallel Lines at Chapter Arts Centre as Steph, as well as Not the Worst Place at Theatr Clwyd in Mold as Emma. For her performance in Parallel Lines, she was nominated for Best Actress by the Theatre Critics of Wales.

That same year, Redford made her London stage debut in Adler & Gibb at the Royal Court Theatre and Ghost from a Perfect Place at the Arcola Theatre. This was followed in 2015 by roles in Closer at Donmar Warehouse and Luna Gale at Hampstead Theatre in London, and The Crucible at the Royal Exchange in Manchester.

In 2017, Redford made her television debut with the recurring role of Lauren in the E4 comedy-drama Gap Year. That same year, she originated the role of Beth in the play The Jungle, performing in the Off-West End, West End, Off-Broadway, and San Francisco runs of the show at the Young Vic, Playhouse Theatre, St. Ann's Warehouse, and Curran Theatre respectively. For the Off-Broadway run, the cast and crew collectively won an Obie Award in the Special Citations category.

Redford starred as Masha in the 2021 world premiere of Cat Goscovitch's one-woman play A Russian Doll at the Barn Theatre in Cirencester, followed by a run at the Arcola in London.

Redford played Lady Rhea Royce in the first season of the HBO fantasy series House of the Dragon, a Game of Thrones prequel and adaptation of George R. R. Martin's companion book Fire and Blood. She has a role in the second season of Shadow and Bone on Netflix.

== Filmography ==
Year	Title	Role	Notes
2014	The Riot Club	Hannah	
2014	Testament of Youth	Exam Candidate	
2017	Gap Year	Lauren	3 episodes
2019	The Return of the Yuletide Kid	Scotty	
2022	House of the Dragon	Rhea Royce	Episode: "We Light the Way"
2023	Shadow and Bone	Fruszi	

== Stage ==
Year	Title	Role	Notes
2013	It's A Family Affair	Lipochka	Sherman Theatre, Cardiff
2013	Parallel Lines	Steph	Chapter Arts Centre, Cardiff
2014	Not The Worst Place	Emma	Theatr Clwyd, Mold
2014	Adler & Gibb	Janet Adler	Royal Court Theatre, London
2014	Ghost from a Perfect Place	Miss Kerosene	Arcola Theatre, London
2015	Closer	Alice	Donmar Warehouse, London
2015	Luna Gale	Karlie	Hampstead Theatre, London
2015	The Crucible	Abigail Williams	Royal Exchange, Manchester
2017–2019	The Jungle	Beth	Young Vic and Playhouse Theatre, London; St. Ann's Warehouse, New York; Curran Theatre, San Francisco
2021	A Russian Doll	Masha	Barn Theatre, Cirencester; Arcola Theatre, London

== Awards and nominations ==
Year	Award	Category	Work	Result	Ref.
2014	Theatre Critics of Wales Awards	Best Actress	Parallel Lines	Nominated	
2019	Obie Awards	Special Citations	The Jungle	Won	(Note: Shared with The Jungle cast and crew.)
