= Graeae Theatre Company =

British organisation

Graeae Theatre Company, often abbreviated to Graeae (pronounced "grey-eye"), is a British organisation composed of disabled artists and theatre makers. As well as producing theatre which it tours nationally and internationally to traditional theatres and outdoor spaces, Graeae run a large and varied Creative Learning and training programme for emerging, young and mid-career deaf and disabled artists.

Graeae was founded in 1980 by Nabil Shaban, a disabled actor, writer and director, and Richard Tomlinson, a life-long disability advocate. The two met at Herewood College for the Disabled, where Shaban was a student and Tomlinson was a lecturer with a passion for the arts. They named their company after the Graeae of Greek mythology. In 1981 the company was offered the use of an office, rehearsal space and facilities for 18 months by the West End Centre, an Arts Centre in Aldershot in Hampshire. During that year, the Company became eligible to receive full funding from the Arts Council of Great Britain. Graeae are currently a National Portfolio Organisation of Arts Council England.

During the COVID-19 pandemic, while live theatres were closed in the UK, the company produced two series of short video plays written by disabled artists entitled Crips Without Constraints. The first series were monologues while the second series were two-person plays. In March 2021, the company announced that an archival recording of their 2017 co-production of The House of Bernarda Alba with the Royal Exchange Theatre would be made available online for a limited time.

== Jenny Sealey ==
Jenny Sealey MBE has been artistic director and CEO since 1997, and Amit Sharma joined as associate director in 2011. Sharma's first involvement with Graeae was as a participant on an actor training course, set up by Sealey, addressing the lack of deaf and disabled people in theatre. Sealey began her career as a deaf actor but made the transition to directing after applying for a Trainee Director position with the company Interplay. She was awarded an MBE in 2009 for her work around disability in the arts. She also co-directed the London 2012 Paralympic Opening Ceremony alongside Bradley Hemmings. Nickie Miles-Wildin took over the role of associate director from Amit Sharma in 2019 and was a performer in the 2012 Paralympic Opening Ceremony.

== Repertoire ==
Actors who have appeared with the company include Nadia Albina, Genevieve Barr, Laurence Clark, Mat Fraser, Beth Hinton-Lever, Arthur Hughes, Cherylee Houston, Aaron Virdee, Melissa Johns, John Kelly, Garry Robson, Kiruna Stamell and co-founder Nabil Shaban.

Graeae has produced plays by Jack Thorne, Sarah Kane, Jackie Hagan, Jo Clifford, David Ireland, Kaite O'Reilly, Lorca, Paul Sirett, Glyn Cannon and Sam Boardman-Jacobs.

Graeae has performed at the National Theatre, Edinburgh Festival Fringe, Birmingham Repertory Theatre, Soho Theatre, Theatre Royal Stratford East, Traverse Theatre Edinburgh, Dundee Rep, Derby Theatre and Royal Exchange Theatre, Manchester.

== Productions ==
- A Private View - 1987
- Bent - 2004
- Deck the Stalls - 2013
- The Limbless Knight - A Tale of Rights Reignited - 2013
- Signs of a Diva - 2014
- The Threepenny Opera - 2014
- Cosmic Scallies by Jackie Hagan - 2015
- Graeae's The Rollettes Christmas Show - 2016
- The Solid Life of Sugar Water by Jack Thorne - 2016
- The Garden - 2016
- Reasons To Be Cheerful by Paul Sirett - 201
- The House of Bernarda Alba by Federico García Lorca - 2017
- Graeae's Midwich Cuckoos - 2017
- Aruna and the Raging Sun - 2018
- Graeae's Ensemble 2018 - Hurricane Protest Songs- 2018
- Courage Everywhere: And Others - 2018
- This Is Not For You - 2018
- Amy Dorrit - 2018
- Blasted by Sarah Kane - 2019
- One Under - 2019
- Three Sisters Rewired by Polly Thomas and Jenny Sealey - 2019
- Bartholomew Abominations by Paul Sirett - 2020
- 10 Nights by Shahid Iqbal Khan - 2021
- Night of the Living Flatpacks by Shahid Iqbal Khan, Michael Southan, Kathryn Golding, Anita Karla Kelly and Leanne Allen - 2021
- Kerbs by Michael Southan - 2022
- The Paradis Files - 2022
- This Woven O by Oliver Macdonald - 2022
- The Chatterleys by Mike Kenny - 2023
- The Festival of Rights: work in progress - 2023
- High Times and Dirty Monsters - 2023
- Self Raising by Jenny Sealey - 2024
- Bad Lads by Mike Kenny - 2025

== Awards ==
In 1984 the Graeae Theatre Company won a Special Award in the Evening Standard Awards, and has since won numerous awards, including the Promotion of Diversity Award at the UK Theatre Awards 2012. It also won the Euan's Guide Most Accessible Production for Jack Thorne's The Solid Life of Sugar Water at the 2015 Edinburgh Festival Fringe.

== See also ==
- Diorama Arts Cooperative
- Shalva Band
- Champions (2018 film)
