= The Accident (British TV series) =

British TV series

- Genre: Drama
- Created by: Jack Thorne
- Written by: Jack Thorne
- Starring: Sarah Lancashire; Mark Lewis Jones; Sidse Babett Knudsen; Adrian Scarborough
- Country of origin: United Kingdom
- Original language: English
- No. of episodes: 4

Production
- Production company: The Forge

Original release
- Network: Channel 4
- Release: 24 October – 14 November 2019

The Accident is a British four-part television drama starring Sarah Lancashire and written by Jack Thorne, which first aired on Channel 4 from 24 October 2019. It explores a fictional Welsh community's fight for justice after an explosion on a construction site, which killed several local children.

== Plot ==
The town of Glyngolau, Wales, has lost its coal mine and steel mill, leaving everyone in financial ruin. A large factory complex, offering 1,000 local jobs, is being built in the town by Kallbridge Developments for a Japanese firm. Iwan, head of the town council, worked hard to secure the project. Iwan's 15-year-old daughter, Leona, is a juvenile delinquent and small-time drug dealer; his wife, Polly, catches Leona in bed with a 30+ year old man. Leona takes eight of her teenage friends to sneak into the building site, to cause destruction and "annoy my Dad".

Their actions cause some gas canisters to explode, leading the building to collapse, killing site manager Alan and eight of the teens – ringleader Leona is the sole survivor. Polly leads a campaign to find out who was responsible for the incident. A public inquiry is held, apportioning the largest blame on Leona and her friends, for breaking into the site and for damaging the material that exploded. A portion of the blame is placed on Alan, for allowing the gas canisters to be stored improperly. The final portion is laid on the company, which has to pay large fines for breaches of health and safety guidelines. Polly and Iwan have a tempestuous relationship, struggling with Leona's injuries and the jealousy of the other parents. Polly also suspects Iwan may know more than he's letting on.

Philip, a campaigning lawyer, helps the towns launch a private prosecution on charges of gross negligence manslaughter against Harriet, the senior vice-president at Kallbridge leading the project. The prosecution is not going well, until Polly persuades Iwan to tell everything he might know.

On the stand, Iwan reveals that Harriet knew that the steel used in the structure was sub-standard. He still has her emails asking him to convince the council's inspector to stay off-site until the steel was encased in concrete. He did this to save the town, but the steel failed in the explosion, resulting in the building collapse.

Iwan and the inspector are both charged and Harriet is sentenced to seven years in prison.

== Cast and characters ==
- Sarah Lancashire as Polly Bevan, a hairdresser married to a local politician
- Mark Lewis Jones as Iwan Bevan, a leading local councillor hoping to improve the town's fortunes
- Jade Croot as Leona Bevan, Polly and Iwan's rebellious daughter, who survives the explosion
- Sidse Babett Knudsen as Harriet Paulsen, executive at Kallbridge Developments who were behind the development project
- Nabhaan Rizwan as Tim, Harriett Paulsen's assistant and love interest
- Joanna Scanlan as Angela, Polly's friend and mother of one of the dead children
- Eiry Thomas as Greta, one of Polly's friends
- Genevieve Barr as Debbie, another of Polly's friends. Her husband dies in the accident.
- Adrian Scarborough as Philip Walters, a campaigning lawyer who takes an interest in the case and offers to become the families' lawyer

== Production ==
The series was filmed at a variety of locations throughout South Wales, mainly in the Rhondda Valley, Swansea and Caldicot. Polly and Iwan's house was in Blaengarw. Hospital scenes were filmed in Cefn Coed Hospital, Kallbridge Developments' plush offices were filmed at the University of South Wales campus in Newport and the Crown Court scenes were filmed in the coroner's court at Cardiff Central Police Station.

== Reception ==
The viewing figures for the series' opening episode were 2.8 million, falling to 2.0 million for the second episode. These were higher than any preceding Channel 4 drama for 2019.

The series was reviewed by The Independent after the first episode, giving it a rating of 4 out of 5 stars, complimenting the cast "packed with sensitive, subtle actors, who can convey emotional blows with a glance". The Telegraph reviewed episode 2 positively, describing it as a "righteous, deceptively smart drama, leavened with flashes of warm wit, alive to both the complexities of culpability and the nuances of human relationships".

The series also attracted a lot of negative criticism. The Telegraph reviewer of the final episode gave the series one star out of five, describing the climax as "like an episode of the old Granada Television series, Crown Court, but without the dramatic tension".
