= Best Interests =

British television drama

- Genre: Drama
- Written by: Jack Thorne
- Directed by: Michael Keillor
- Starring: Sharon Horgan; Michael Sheen
- Country of origin: United Kingdom
- Original language: English
- No. of series: 1
- No. of episodes: 4

Production
- Executive producers: Sharon Horgan; Michael Sheen; Sophie Gardiner; Toby Bentley; Michael Keillor; Jack Thorne; Lucy Richer
- Producer: Jenny Frayn
- Running time: 56 minutes
- Production companies: Chapter One Pictures; One Shoe Films

Original release
- Network: BBC One
- Release: 12 June – 20 June 2023

Best Interests is a British television drama miniseries written by Jack Thorne. It stars Sharon Horgan and Michael Sheen as a married couple, fighting for their disabled daughter's medical care. It premiered on BBC One on 12 June 2023. The show was well-received by critics, and was nominated for several awards, winning Best Limited Series at the Banff Rockie Awards.

== Plot ==
13-year-old Marnie has a rare form of muscular dystrophy that was diagnosed when she was a baby. When she ends up in intensive care after a chest infection, Marnie's doctor Samantha questions whether her treatment should be continued. Marnie's parents, Nicci and Andrew, fight to have her treatment continued but are driven apart by conflicting attitudes towards the battle.

== Cast ==
- Sharon Horgan as Nicci
- Michael Sheen as Andrew
- Alison Oliver as Katie
- Niamh Moriarty as Marnie
- Noma Dumezweni as Samantha
- Chizzy Akudolu as Mercy
- Des McAleer as Eddie
- Mat Fraser as Greg
- Gary Beadle as Frank
- Jack Morris as Tom
- Pippa Haywood as Judge Spottiswood
- Shane Zaza as Fred
- Lucian Msamati as Derek
- Lisa McGrillis as Brenda

== Episodes ==
No.	Directed by	Written by	Original release date	U.K. viewers (millions)
1	Michael Keillor	Jack Thorne	12 June 2023	2.76
2	Michael Keillor	Jack Thorne	13 June 2023	N/A
3	Michael Keillor	Jack Thorne	19 June 2023	2.76
4	Michael Keillor	Jack Thorne	20 June 2023	N/A

== Production ==
The series was commissioned by Piers Wenger, director of BBC Drama and Charlotte Moore, BBC's chief content officer. The four-part drama series was written by Jack Thorne.

Filming began in London in March 2022.

== Broadcast ==
Best Interest premiered on BBC One 12 June 2023.

The series was screened on Australian public broadcaster ABC Television's streaming service ABC iview on 2 January 2024, and from Sunday 14 January on ABC TV. In the United States, it was released on subscription streaming platform Acorn TV in February 2025. Best Interests was available to stream on Netflix from 10 July 2026.

== Reception ==
Lucy Mangan, writing in The Guardian, gave the show five stars out of five, praising the performances of both lead actors. The Independent's Nick Hilton gave it four stars, praising the script as well as the acting.

Best Interests was chosen as one of the 10 best TV shows of 2023 by The Daily Telegraph.

The series was nominated for several awards, winning Best Limited Series at the Banff Rockie Awards.

=== Accolades ===
Year	Award	Category	Nominee	Result	Ref.
2023	Series Mania	Best Actor in International Competition	Michael Sheen	Won	
2024	TV Choice Awards	Best New Drama	Best Interests	Nominated	
2024	TV Choice Awards	Best Actor	Michael Sheen	Nominated	
2024	Royal Television Society Programme Awards	Best Limited Series	Best Interests	Nominated	
2024	British Academy Television Awards	Best Limited Drama	Best Interests	Nominated	
2024	British Academy Television Awards	Best Actress	Sharon Horgan	Nominated	
2024	Irish Film and Television Awards	Best Lead Actress - Television Drama	Sharon Horgan	Nominated	
2024	Banff Rockie Awards	Best Limited Series	Best Interests	Won	
