= Jack Thorne =

British playwright and screenwriter (born 1978)

Jack Thorne FRSL
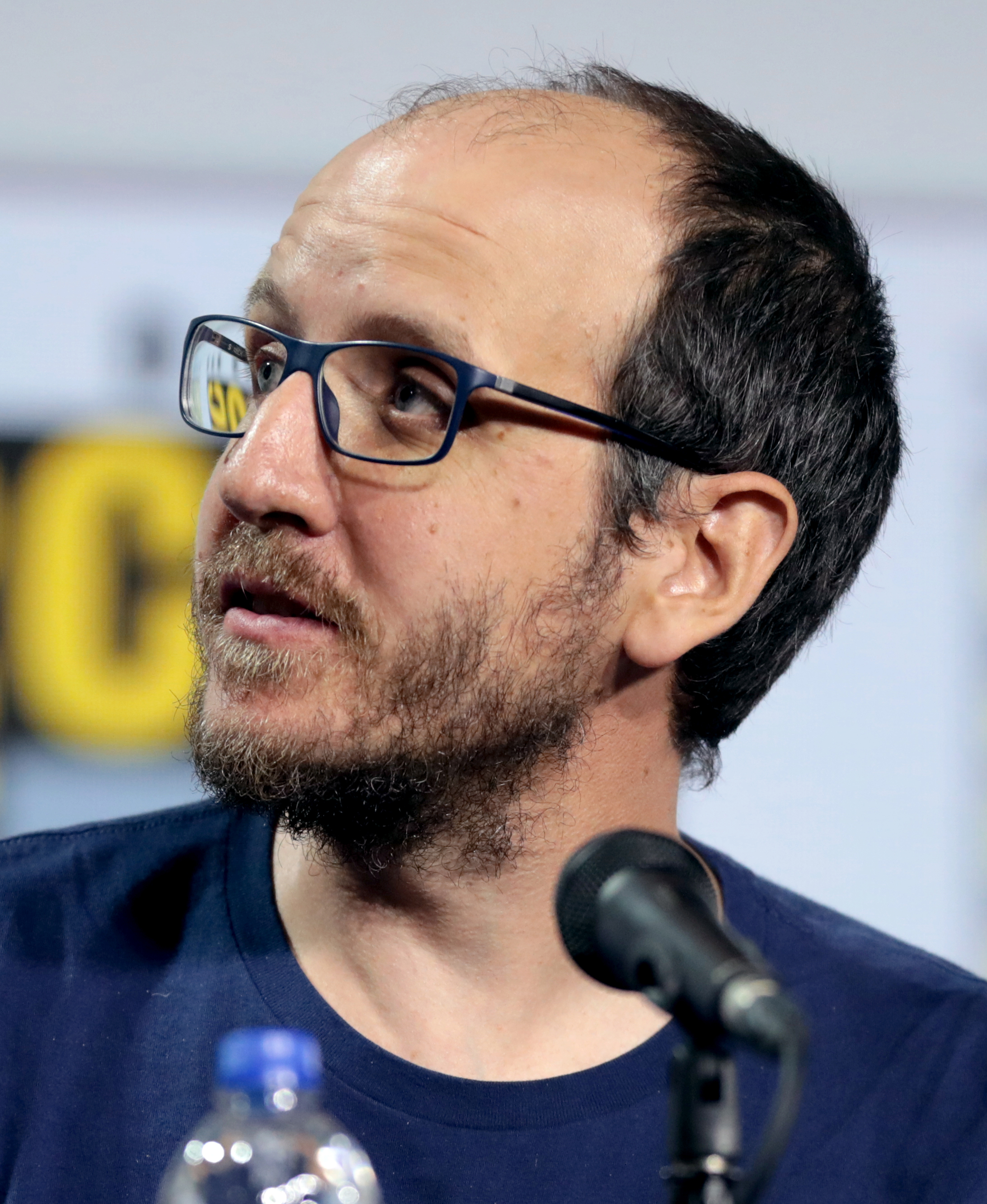
- Thorne at the 2019 San Diego Comic-Con
- Born: 6 December 1978 (age 47); Bristol, England
- Education: Pembroke College, Cambridge
- Occupations: Playwright; screenwriter; producer
- Years active: 2004–present
- Spouse: Rachel Mason
- Children: One

Jack Thorne (born 6 December 1978) is a British playwright, screenwriter, and producer. His accolades include a Golden Globe, two Primetime Emmy Awards, and six BAFTA Awards.

Thorne is best known for writing the stage play Harry Potter and the Cursed Child (2016), the films Wonder (2017), Enola Holmes (2020) and the latter's sequel (2022), and the television programme His Dark Materials (2019–2022). Between 2010 and 2015, Thorne co-wrote three connected mini-series based on the film This Is England – This Is England '86, This Is England '88 and This Is England '90 – with director Shane Meadows.

In 2023, Thorne's four-part mini-series Best Interests was released starring Michael Sheen and Sharon Horgan. It was nominated for several awards, winning Best Limited Series at the Banff Rockie Awards.

Thorne's two 2025 mini-series, Toxic Town and Adolescence, were released on Netflix to widespread critical acclaim.

In 2026, the first ever TV series adaptation of William Golding's 1954 novel Lord of the Flies was released with Thorne serving as screenwriter, which received positive reviews.

== Early life and education ==
Thorne was born in Bristol on 6 December 1978. He was educated at St Bartholomew's School in Newbury, Berkshire, and studied politics at Pembroke College, Cambridge, matriculating in 1998. He was forced to "degrade" (drop out to return at a later date) due to ill health in his third year, but returned to finish his studies and graduated with lower second-class honours in 2002.

== Career ==
=== Theatre ===
Thorne's plays for the stage include When You Cure Me (Bush Theatre 2005), Fanny and Faggot (Edinburgh Festival Fringe 2004, Finborough Theatre and tour, 2007), Stacy (Arcola Theatre and Trafalgar Studios, 2007), Burying Your Brother in the Pavement (Royal National Theatre Connections Festival 2008), 2 May 1997 (Bush Theatre 2009), Bunny (Underbelly and tour 2010) which won a Fringe First at the 2010 Edinburgh Festival and Hope (Royal Court Theatre, 2014). He also collaborated on Greenland (2011) with Moira Buffini, Penelope Skinner and Matt Charman at the National Theatre. In 2011 he participated in the Bush Theatre's project Sixty-Six Books, for which he wrote a piece based upon a book of the King James Bible. In 2012 his version of Friedrich Duerrenmatt's The Physicists was staged at the Donmar Warehouse.

Thorne's 2013 adaptation of the book and film Let The Right One In was staged in a production by the National Theatre of Scotland at Dundee Rep Theatre, London's Royal Court Theatre, West End and New York's St. Ann's Warehouse. In summer 2015, his play The Solid Life of Sugar Water premiered at the Edinburgh Festival Fringe, produced by Graeae Theatre Company and Theatre Royal Plymouth, it then toured in early 2016, with a run at the National Theatre in March 2016. Together with the composer Stephen Warbeck, Thorne wrote Junkyard, a coming-of-age musical centred around 'The Vench', an adventure playground in Lockleaze, Bristol.

Thorne wrote the stage play Harry Potter and the Cursed Child, based on an original story by Thorne, J. K. Rowling and John Tiffany, which is running at the Palace Theatre in London's West End since August 2016, on Broadway at the Lyric Theatre since April 2018, in Melbourne's Princess Theatre since February 2019 and San Francisco's Curran Theatre since December 2019. Thorne also wrote a new adaptation of Woyzeck by Georg Büchner for the Old Vic in 2017 with John Boyega in the title role. He wrote a new adaptation of A Christmas Carol by Charles Dickens for the Old Vic for the Christmas 2017 season, directed by Matthew Warchus, which has subsequently returned every year, as well as for the 2019 season on Broadway at the Lyceum Theatre and the 2020 live broadcast through Old Vic: On Camera due to the COVID-19 pandemic. In November 2025, A Christmas Carol returned to New York for an Off-Broadway run at the Perelman Performing Arts Center. Thorne rewrote the musical adaptation of King Kong for its 2018 Broadway debut. Thorne penned the play the end of history for Royal Court Theatre in 2019, starring David Morrissey and Lesley Sharp. Thorne's play Sunday premiered at Atlantic Theatre Company in New York in 2019, directed by Lee Sunday Evans. In June 2021, his adaptation of After Life based on the film of the same name opened at the National Theatre, London.

In April 2023, Thorne's play The Motive and the Cue, directed by Sam Mendes, about the making of Richard Burton and John Gielgud's Hamlet, opened in the Lyttleton Theatre at the National Theatre, before transferring to the Noël Coward Theatre in the West End in December 2023. In June 2023, his play When Winston Went to War with the Wireless, directed by Katy Rudd, about the BBC during the 1926 General Strike, premiered at the Donmar Warehouse. In November 2023, Stranger Things: The First Shadow, a prequel to the Netflix Series by Kate Trefry with a story by Thorne, Trefry and The Duffer Brothers and directed by Stephen Daldry, opened at the Phoenix Theatre, London.

In October 2027, his play The Humans, based on the 2013 novel by Matt Haig, will premiere at Theatre Royal Haymarket in London's West End, directed by Jeremy Herrin and starring Matt Smith.

Thorne's plays are published by Nick Hern Books.

=== Television ===
Thorne has written for the TV shows Skins and Shameless. He co-created Cast Offs, and co-wrote This Is England '86, This Is England '88, This Is England '90, and The Virtues with Shane Meadows. Thorne was also in the running to write an episode for the fifth series of Doctor Who, but amicably parted ways with the production. In August 2010, BBC Three announced Thorne would be writing a 60-minute, six episode supernatural drama for the channel called Touch, later re-titled The Fades. In 2012, he won BAFTA awards for both drama series (The Fades) and serial (This Is England '88). In 2014, Thorne's original rural teen murder drama Glue premiered on E4 and the show was nominated Best Multichannel Programme and the 2015 Broadcast Awards. In autumn of 2015 This Is England '90 was broadcast on Channel 4 and earned Thorne a Best Series Award at the Jameson Empire Awards 2016 and the BAFTA for Best Mini-Series in 2016. Next, the pan-European diamond-heist thriller for Sky Atlantic The Last Panthers, which aired in the UK in September 2015, was BAFTA nominated for Best Drama Series. To round up a hat-trick of nominations at the 2016 BAFTA TV Awards, Thorne's BBC 3 drama Don't Take My Baby was nominated and went on to win the BAFTA for Best Single Drama. Thorne's Channel 4 drama National Treasure started on 20 September 2016 and won the BAFTA for Best Mini-Series in 2017.

In April 2016 it was announced that Thorne would be adapting Philip Pullman's epic trilogy His Dark Materials for BBC One. In 2017, it was announced that he would write an episode of the Channel 4/Amazon Video series Philip K. Dick's Electric Dreams and would write the Damien Chazelle musical drama Netflix series The Eddy. Thorne's four-part dark drama Kiri began on Channel Four on 10 January 2018 and was nominated for Best Mini Series at the 2019 BAFTA's. His Channel Four show The Accident began on 24 October 2019 and starred Sarah Lancashire.

In 2021, Thorne wrote the television film Help. Set and filmed in Liverpool, Help focused on the plight of disabled people and their carers during the COVID-19 pandemic in the UK and addressed the multitude of ways in which Boris Johnson's government had failed them. It was acclaimed by critics, with Carol Midgley of The Times calling it "a shaming nightmare [that] all ministers should see", and won Best Drama at the 2021 Rose d'Or Awards.

In 2022, Thorne co-wrote Then Barbara Met Alan with Genevieve Barr, the true story of Barbara Lisicki and Alan Holdsworth, the founders of DAN (Disabled People's Direct Action Network). It tells the story of two disabled cabaret performers who meet at a gig in 1989, fall in love and, driven by their own experiences and the experiences of those around them of discrimination, mistreatment, and the realities of living in an ableist society, lead protests nationwide, eventually leading to the passing of the Disability Discrimination Act 1995. Then Barbara Met Alan was received to both popular and critical acclaim, with Frances Ryan of The Guardian saying "By the time the real-life Barbara was on screen in the final scene – with a ramp symbolically coming out of a bus to finally give her entry – I was crying. For what we gained. For what was taken from us for decades, and still is. For the campaigners who gave so much for my generation and those that do today. Roar in the streets and kiss your lover. This is what disability looks like – and the battle continues."

In 2023, Thorne wrote the four-part BBC drama Best Interests, starring Michael Sheen and Sharon Horgan as loving parents who are forced to make a harrowing decision about their daughter's medical care. The series was well-received by critics, who described it as "a masterly and profoundly moving examination" and a "searing, intimate, heart-wrenching look at a family in crisis."

In 2025, Thorne had several television projects released, including the Netflix drama Toxic Town, which follows the story of three mothers involved in the Corby toxic waste case. The series was executive produced by Charlie Brooker and Annabel Jones. Netflix also released the four-part limited series Adolescence, which Thorne co-wrote with Stephen Graham about a 13-year-old boy who is accused of murder. Adolescence topped the UK’s weekly TV ratings, with its first episode pulling in 6.45 million viewers in its first week, according to ratings provider Barb. It made history as the first streaming show to top the UK's weekly TV ratings. Thorne also wrote about the News International phone hacking scandal for the ITVX television series The Hack which was released in September 2025.

In 2026, Thorne wrote a BBC television adaptation of William Golding's novel Lord of the Flies, which depicts a group of young boys stranded on a tropical island in the Pacific Ocean after a plane crash. The adaptation consists of four episodes, each titled after one of the main characters: Piggy, Jack, Simon and Ralph. This was the first ever television adaptation of the novel and Judy Golding, the author's daughter, has said she believes her father would have been happy with the series.

Thorne’s Channel 4 romantic drama Falling was also released in 2026. The series has been described as Thorne’s first love story and centres on a nun, Anna (Keeley Hawes), and a Catholic priest, David (Paapa Essiedu), who fall for each other and must wrestle with what this means for their faith and their vows.

=== Radio ===
Thorne has written four plays for radio; an adaptation of When You Cure Me (BBC Radio 3, 2006), Left at the Angel (BBC Radio 4, 2007), an adaptation of The Hunchback of Notre-Dame (co-written with Alex Bulmer, BBC Radio 4, 2009) and People Snogging in Public Places (BBC Radio 3, 2009). The latter won him the Sony Radio Academy Awards Gold for Best Drama 2010. The judges described it "as a wonderfully written and performed, highly original piece of radio drama in which the production perfectly mirrored the subject. Painful and funny, it was a bold exciting listen." A Summer Night (BBC Radio 3, 2011) was Thorne's response to the 2011 London riots, transmitted live as part of the Free Thinking festival.

In 2012, People Snogging in Public Places was produced and broadcast by France-Culture (in the Fictions / Drôles de drames slot) under the French title of Regarder passer les trains (translator: Jacqueline Chnéour).

=== Film ===
Thorne's first film The Scouting Book for Boys was released in 2009, it won him Best Newcomer at the London Film Festival. The jury said, "Jack Thorne is a poetic writer with an end-of-the-world imagination and a real gift for story-telling." Thorne has been commissioned to write feature films for producers both sides of the Atlantic, with credits including War Book starring Sophie Okonedo which Tom Harper directed, and A Long Way Down starring Pierce Brosnan, Toni Collette and Aaron Paul (directed by Pascal Chaumeil) based on the novel by Nick Hornby.

On 8 May 2013, Thorne was hired to write Wonder, a film adaptation of the 2012 novel of the same name by R.J. Palacio. Thorne co-wrote the script with Steve Conrad and Stephen Chbosky. The latter directed the film, which starred Julia Roberts, Owen Wilson, and Jacob Tremblay and was released on 17 November 2017. On 2 August 2017, it was announced he would rewrite the script for Star Wars: The Rise of Skywalker, but on 12 September 2017, he was replaced by J. J. Abrams and Chris Terrio. In 2018, it was announced that he would rewrite the initial screenplay penned by Chris Weitz for Disney's live-action adaptation of Pinocchio, then to be directed by Paul King.

Thorne also co-wrote the 2019 film The Aeronauts with Tom Harper for Amazon Studios, starring Felicity Jones and Eddie Redmayne. Although Amazon does not release exact streaming figures, Jennifer Salke, Head of Amazon Studios said in an interview with Deadline Hollywood that as of January 2020 The Aeronauts was the most viewed movie of all time on Amazon Prime.

2020 saw the release of three more films written by Thorne, including Radioactive, a biographical drama about Marie Curie, starring Rosamund Pike; The Secret Garden, an adaptation of the novel of the same name; and Enola Holmes, about the sister of Sherlock Holmes, starring Millie Bobby Brown and Helena Bonham Carter. Thorne would also write the sequel, which released on Netflix in 2022, as well as Enola Holmes 3, which was released in 2026.

Thorne co-wrote the film The Swimmers in 2022, which follows two young sisters on their harrowing journey as refugees, from war-torn Syria to the 2016 Rio Olympics. In 2024, he co-wrote Joy, about three pioneering British scientists in the 1960s and 1970s and their struggle to develop IVF — against all odds.

Thorne wrote a treatment to the 2025 sequel to Tron: Legacy (2010), titled Tron: Ares, though he ultimately went uncredited. In June 2026, it was announced that he was writing and executive producing a new film adaptation of Treasure Island for director Ridley Scott, with Hugh Jackman starring as Long John Silver; the film is set to be released in theatres on 11 November 2027.

== Campaigning and advocacy ==
Thorne has been a long-term advocate for the disabled community in the dramatic arts. After he developed cholinergic urticaria when he was 20 years old, he became allergic to outdoor heat, artificial heat, and his own body heat. This gave him chronic pain that forced him to leave university and spend much of his early twenties in bed. Despite this, he felt unsure whether he could identify as a disabled person; after attending a Graeae Theatre Company open day (which he described as the "National Theatre of disability") three years after his diagnosis, he was accepted with open arms. He described the incident as a "coming out moment" and a "crucial part" of who he is. He has since written disabled dramas The Hunchback of Notre Dame, The Spastic King, Cast Offs, The Solid Life of Sugar Water, Don't Take My Baby, CripTales, and Then Barbara Met Alan, and has become a patron of the Graeae Theatre Company.

In August 2021, Thorne delivered the Edinburgh TV Festival's prestigious MacTaggart Lecture. He used the speech to discuss television's power as an "empathy box" in the living room of millions and its failings for neglecting a large and vibrant part of the populace by poorly representing the disabled community. Thorne points to the great suffering of disabled people during the COVID-19 pandemic in which the media rendered huge numbers of deaths acceptable through usage of the term "underlying health condition". The speech also outlined how television industry practice has been discriminatory towards disabled artists, and the dire need for the industry to commit to change, both off-screen and on; alongside Genevieve Barr and Katie Player, Thorne announced a pressure group called Underlying Health Condition which aims to elevate disabled voices in the industry. Thorne argues that more disabled stories written by disabled people and performed by disabled people would make visible what's invisible in the "empathy box" in the homes of the public and cause change to happen.

On 3 December 2021, Underlying Health Condition was launched at an event at the Tate Modern, collaborating with other disability organisations such as Disabled Artists Networking Community, the Creative Diversity Network and 1in4 Coalition, to propose a series of requirements and measures to accommodate and support disabled artists in television. This, in turn, led to the launch of The TV Access Project, or TAP, which has seen 10 of the UK's biggest broadcasters commit to the full inclusion of Deaf Disabled and/or Neurodivergent Talent by 2030. TAP created best practice guidelines to ensure this inclusion, referred to as the 5As: Anticipate, Ask, Assess, Adjust, Advocate.

Within its first year, TAP delivered 20 sustainable, tangible solutions towards its vision of full inclusion, including launching TAPStars, a programme funded by the broadcasters and streamers who are TAP members to support early-career disabled off-screen talent; introducing an Access To Work pilot scheme to fast-track applications and access provision for freelances, and oversee reimbursements from Access to Work; securing a commitment from all TAP members to fund necessary access costs not covered by Access to Work, over and above the production budget; giving 82 Commissioning Editors and senior leaders from TAP members fundamental 5As training, delivered by CDN; and writing an outline of key access-related roles and responsibilities across productions and commissioning, to be adopted alongside access coordinators.

In August 2024, it was announced that all 10 TAP members - the BBC, Channel 4, ITV, Disney+, UKTV, BritBox, Sky UK, Paramount Pictures, STV and Amazon Prime Video – would boycott any studios and production spaces which had not completed the TV Access Project's accessibility audit by August 2025. This audit requires studios to self-assess their own accessibility in 4 key areas: Production buildings, Locations – external, Locations – Internal, and Outside Broadcast.

== Personal life ==
Thorne is married to Rachel Mason. They underwent multiple attempts at IVF to have their son, Elliott. The experience later led them to develop the film Joy. His wife's sister Cath is married to the comedian Frank Skinner.

In 2022, Thorne was diagnosed as being autistic. He was inspired to seek diagnosis following a question on Desert Island Discs.

== Filmography ==
=== Short films ===
Writer

- The Mascot (2005)
- A Supermarket Love Song (2006)
- Bunny (2018)
- An Almost Christmas Story (2024)

Producer

- The Swarm (2011)

=== Film writer ===
- The Scouting Book for Boys (2009)
- A Long Way Down (2014)
- War Book (2014)
- Wonder (2017)
- The Aeronauts (2019) (Also producer)
- Radioactive (2019)
- Dirt Music (2019)
- The Secret Garden (2020)
- Enola Holmes (2020)
- The Swimmers (2022)
- Enola Holmes 2 (2022)
- Joy (2024)
- Chork (2026)
- Enola Holmes 3 (2026)
- The Beatles — A Four-Film Cinematic Event (2028)
- Séance on a Wet Afternoon (TBA)

=== Television ===
TV series

Year	Title	Writer	Executive Producer	Creator	Notes
2007	Shameless	Yes	No	No	Episode: "The Runaway"
2007	Coming Up	Yes	No	No	Episode: "The Spastic King"
2007–2009	Skins (British)	Yes	No	No	5 episodes
2009	Cast Offs	Yes	No	Yes	Also associate producer and co-producer
2011	Skins (American)	Yes	No	No	Episode: "Chris"
2011	The Fades	Yes	Yes	Yes	
2012	Sinbad	Yes	No	No	Episode: "Kuji"
2014	Glue	Yes	Yes	Yes	Wrote 6 episodes
2015	Glue Online	No	Yes	No	
2015	The Last Panthers	Yes	Yes	Yes	
2017	Electric Dreams	Yes	No	No	Episode: "The Commuter"
2019–2022	His Dark Materials	Yes	Yes	No	Also developer and showrunner
2020	CripTales	Yes	No	No	Episode: "Hamish"
2022–present	Am I Being Unreasonable?	No	Yes	No	

Miniseries

Year	Title	Writer	Executive Producer	Creator
2010	This Is England '86	Yes	Yes	No
2011	This Is England '88	Yes	No	No
2015	This Is England '90	Yes	No	No
2016	National Treasure	Yes	Yes	Yes
2018	Kiri	Yes	Yes	Yes
2019	The Virtues	Yes	No	No
2019	The Accident	Yes	Yes	Yes
2020	The Eddy	Yes	Yes	Yes
2023	Best Interests	Yes	Yes	Yes
2025	Toxic Town	Yes	Yes	Yes
2025	Adolescence	Yes	Yes	Yes
2025	The Hack	Yes	Yes	Yes
2026	Lord of the Flies	Yes	Yes	Yes
2026	Falling	Yes	Yes	Yes

TV movies

Year	Title	Writer	Executive Producer
2015	Don't Take My Baby	Yes	No
2021	Help	Yes	Yes
2022	Then Barbara Met Alan	Yes	Yes

== Awards ==
Royal Television Society Awards

Year	Category	Nominated work	Result	Ref.
2011	Best Drama Serial	This Is England '86	Nominated	
2011	Best Writer – Drama	This Is England '86	Won	
2012	Best Drama Series	The Fades	Nominated	
2016	Best Writer – Drama	This Is England '90	Nominated	
2016	Best Drama Series	This Is England '90	Nominated	
2017	Best Writer	National Treasure	Nominated	
2017	Best Mini-Series	National Treasure	Won	
2022	Best Single Drama	Help	Won	
2022	Best Single Drama	Help	Won	
2022	Best Writer - Drama	Help	Nominated	
2022	Outstanding Contribution to British Television 2022		Won	
2023	Best Single Drama	Then Barbara Met Alan	Nominated	
2023	Best Comedy Drama	Am I Being Unreasonable?	Nominated	
2023	RTS Fellowship		Won	
2024	Best Limited Series	Best Interests	Nominated	
2026	Limited Series and Single Drama	Adolescence	Won	
2026	Writer - Drama	Adolescence	Won	

BAFTA Awards

Year	Award	Category	Nominated work	Result	Ref.
2012	BAFTA Craft Awards	Best Writer	The Fades	Nominated	
2012	BAFTA TV Awards	Best Drama Series	The Fades	Won	
2012	BAFTA TV Awards	Best Mini-Series	This is England '88	Won	
2016	BAFTA TV Awards	Best Drama Series	The Last Panthers	Nominated	
2016	BAFTA TV Awards	Best Single Drama	Don't Take My Baby	Won	
2016	BAFTA TV Awards	Best Mini-Series	This Is England '90	Won	
2017	BAFTA TV Awards	Best Mini-Series	National Treasure	Won	
2019	BAFTA TV Awards	Best Mini-Series	Kiri	Nominated	
2020	BAFTA TV Awards	Best Mini-Series	The Virtues	Nominated	
2020	BAFTA Craft Awards	Writer: Drama	The Virtues	Nominated	
2021	BAFTA Scotland	Best Television Scripted	Crip Tales	Nominated	
2022	BAFTA Craft Awards	Best Writer: Drama	Help	Nominated	
2022	BAFTA TV Awards	Best Single Drama	Help	Nominated	
2023	BAFTA Film Awards	Outstanding British Film	The Swimmers	Nominated	
2023	BAFTA TV Awards	Best Scripted Comedy	Am I Being Unreasonable?	Nominated	
2024	BAFTA TV Awards	Best Limited Drama	Best Interests	Nominated	
2026	BAFTA TV Awards	Memorable Moment	Adolescence	Nominated	
2026	BAFTA TV Awards	Best Limited Drama	Adolescence	Won	
2026	BAFTA Craft Awards	Best Writer: Drama	Adolescence	Nominated	

Writers' Guild of Great Britain Awards

Year	Category	Nominated work	Result	Ref.
2012	Best Television Short-Form Drama	This is England '88	Nominated	
2022	Outstanding Contribution to Writing		Won	
2022	Best Short Form TV Drama	Then Barbara Met Alan	Nominated	

Broadcast Awards

Year	Category	Nominated work	Result	Ref.
2017	Best Drama Series or Serial	This Is England '90	Won	
2019	Best Drama Series or Serial	Kiri	Nominated	
2022	Best Single Drama	Help	Won	
2022	Best Lockdown Programme	Help	Nominated	
2022	Best Single Drama	Then Barbara Met Alan	Won	
2022	Best Original Programme	Then Barbara Met Alan	Nominated	
2025	Best New Drama	Adolescence	Won	
2025	Best Original Programme	Adolescence	Nominated	

Other awards

Year	Award	Category	Nominated work	Result	Ref.
2009	London Film Festival Awards	Best British Newcomer	The Scouting Book for Boys	Won	
2010	Edinburgh Fringe Festival	Fringe First	Bunny	Won	
2015	Drama Desk Awards	Outstanding Play	Let the Right One In	Nominated	
2016	Jameson Empire Award	Best TV Series	This Is England '90	Won	
2017	Biarritz International Festival of Audiovisual Programming	TV series and Serials: Screenplay	National Treasure	Won	
2017	Olivier Awards	Best New Play	Harry Potter and the Cursed Child	Won	
2017	Evening Standard Theatre Awards	Best Play	Harry Potter and the Cursed Child	Won	
2018	Tony Awards	Best Play	Harry Potter and the Cursed Child	Won	
2018	Broadcast Film Critics Association Awards	Best Adapted Screenplay	Wonder	Nominated	
2020	Drama Desk Awards	Outstanding Adaptation	A Christmas Carol	Won	
2020	Broadcasting Press Guild Awards	Best Writer	The Virtues	Nominated	
2020	Broadcasting Press Guild Awards	Best Writer	His Dark Materials	Nominated	
2021	Prix Italia	TV Performing Arts	Crip Tales	Won	
2021	Rose d'Or	Best Drama	Help	Won	
2022	Sandford St Martin Awards	Radio Times Readers' Award	Help	Nominated	
2022	Banff Rockie Award	Best Feature Length Film	Help	Won	
2022	Banff Rockie Award	Rockies Grand Jury Prize	Help	Won	
2022	Venice TV Awards	Best TV Film	Help	Won	
2022	Seoul International Drama Awards	Best TV Movie	Help	Won	
2022	International Emmy Awards	Best TV Movie / Mini Series	Help	Won	
2022	C21 Drama Awards	Best TV Movie	Help	Nominated	
2023	National Film and Television School	Honorary Fellowship		Won	
2023	Banff Rockie Award	Best Feature Length Film	Then Barbara Met Alan	Nominated	
2023	Evening Standard Theatre Awards	Best Play	The Motive and the Cue	Won	
2023	WhatsOnStage Awards	Best New Play	The Motive and the Cue	Nominated	
2024	Banff Rockie Award	Best Limited Series	Best Interests	Won	
2024	Critics' Circle Theatre Awards	Best New Play	The Motive and the Cue	Won	
2024	Olivier Awards	Best New Play	The Motive and the Cue	Nominated	
2025	Gotham TV Awards	Breakthrough Limited Series	Adolescence	Won	
2025	The Astra Awards	Best Limited Series	Adolescence	Won	
2025	The Astra Awards	Best Writing in a Limited Series or TV Movie	Adolescence	Won	
2025	Edinburgh TV Awards	Best Drama	Adolescence	Won	
2025	TCA Awards	Program of the Year	Adolescence	Nominated	
2025	TCA Awards	Outstanding Achievement in Movies, Miniseries or Specials	Adolescence	Won	
2025	Emmy Awards	Outstanding Limited or Anthology Series	Adolescence	Won	
2025	Emmy Awards	Outstanding Writing for a Limited or Anthology Series or Movie	Adolescence	Won	
2025	Seoul International Drama Awards	Best Miniseries	Adolescence	Nominated	
2025	Seoul International Drama Awards	Best Screenwriter	Adolescence	Nominated	
2025	Seoul International Drama Awards	Grand Prize	Adolescence	Won	
2025	National Television Awards	New Drama	Adolescence	Won	
2025	Sky Arts Awards	Best Television	Adolescence	Won	
2025	Rose d’Or	Drama	Adolescence	Won	
2025	Rose d’Or	The Golden Rose	Adolescence	Won	
2026	AACTA Awards	Audience Choice Award for Favourite TV Series	Adolescence	Nominated	
2026	AACTA International Awards	Best Drama Series	Adolescence	Won	
2026	Film Independent Spirit Awards	Best New Scripted Series	Adolescence	Won	
2026	American Film Institute Awards	Top 10 Television Programs	Adolescence	Won	
2026	Critics Choice Awards	Best Limited Series	Adolescence	Won	
2026	Golden Globe Awards	Best Limited or Anthology Series	Adolescence	Won	
2026	Producers Guild of America Awards	David L. Wolper Award for Outstanding Producer of Limited or Anthology Series Television	Adolescence	Won	
2026	Satellite Awards	Best Miniseries & Limited Series or Motion Picture Made for Television	Adolescence	Won	
2026	Broadcasting Press Guild Awards	Best Single Drama or Miniseries	Adolescence	Won	
2026	Broadcasting Press Guild Awards	Best Writer	Adolescence	Won	
2026	Peabody Awards	Entertainment	Adolescence	Won	
2026	Television and Radio Industries Club Awards	Best Drama	Adolescence	Won	
2026	Children's and Family Emmy Awards	Outstanding Animated Special	An Almost Christmas Story	Nominated	
2026	Scope Awards	Celebrity Role Model		Nominated	
2026	Gotham TV Awards	Outstanding Limited or Anthology Series	Lord of the Flies	Nominated	
2026	IndieWire Honors	Wavelength Award	Lord of the Flies	Won	

== See also ==
- List of British playwrights
