= Jenny Sealey =

British theatre administrator

Jenny Sealey OBE (born 1963) is an English theatre director from Nottingham.

Sealey began her career as a deaf actor but made the transition to directing after applying for a Trainee Director position with the company Interplay. She has been the artistic director of the Theatre Company Graeae since 1997. Sealey's work in theatre and the creative arts focuses on empowering deaf and disabled actors through inclusive productions. She was awarded an MBE in 2009 and an OBE in 2022 for her services to disability arts.

In 2012 Sealey was one of the artistic directors for the 2012 Summer Paralympics opening ceremony.

She was appointed as a vice-president of the Royal Central School of Speech and Drama in 2022.

In August 2023 Sealey's Edinburgh Festival Fringe play Self-Raising received a Neurodiverse Review Award.
