= Better Off Dead? =

2024 documentary on assisted suicide

Title screen

Better Off Dead? is a documentary on assisted suicide written and presented by disability rights activist Liz Carr, which was broadcast on BBC One in May 2024. During the documentary, she advocates against the legalisation of assisted suicide in the United Kingdom due to concerns for its implications for disabled people. The programme received generally positive reviews.

== Background ==
Carr has arthrogryposis and began using wheelchairs aged 11. In 2011, after the BBC broadcast Terry Pratchett: Choosing to Die, she asked to make a documentary presenting the opposite view. Better Off Dead? was commissioned in 2023, is one hour long, and was broadcast on BBC One on 14 May 2024. During production, Carr said that the talk with her mother about her childhood experiences was emotionally draining and made her feel "really quite ill".

== Content ==
Better Off Dead? begins with Carr and disabled people recounting experiences where others had told them that if they had the same condition, they would rather be dead; they also share times where people said that they should commit suicide to stop being a "drain on society". Carr rejects the term "assisted dying" and prefers "assisted suicide"; she views the argument over legalisation as a frightening issue for disabled people instead of a matter exclusively for the terminally ill.

Carr and Lisa Hammond discuss the portrayal of disability in the media, highlighting how it is frequently depicted as inspiration porn; they criticise the movie Me Before You for "glorification of our choice to die". Carr calls society's perceptions of able-bodied people attempting suicide a "two-tier system: suicide prevention for some, suicide approval for others". Carr and her mother discuss Carr's childhood, as well as when Carr at 12 years old said that she wanted to die.

Carr speaks to fellow activist Jane Campbell, who has consistently spoken out against bills legalising assisted suicide in the House of Lords. On the other side of the debate is Charles Falconer: he argues that legalisation would provide greater autonomy, as people who seek it would not have to do so alone. Falconer believes that assisted suicide should only be allowed for terminal illnesses, while Carr holds that public pressure would lead to its scope being expanded.

While investigating Canada's medical assistance in dying law (MAID), Carr speaks to a doctor who carries out such procedures; the doctor talks about the importance of autonomy for applicants and argues that compelling people to continue in "unbearable suffering" is cruel. Carr later points out that MAID has been expanded to include a second track, for which those who are not terminally ill are eligible.

Carr speaks to a woman who says that her mother was granted MAID despite being mentally ill; she and Carr argue that there are insufficient safeguards in place. A disabled man tells Carr that he applied for MAID after facing eviction as he did not want to become homeless. Carr contrasts the months-long waiting period for MAID with the years-long waiting period for social housing.

Katherine Sleeman, a professor in palliative care, reframes the argument over assisted suicide as whether it is societally appropriate; she is most concerned with the risk of coercion for vulnerable people, while disabled journalist Melanie Reid wants assisted suicide as an insurance policy and feels that Carr is part of a smaller group imposing their views on the rest of the disabled community.

In the last few minutes of the documentary, Carr and other activists celebrate disability and share their concerns about assisted suicide.

== Reception ==
Better Off Dead? received generally positive reviews, receiving five stars from The Guardian's Frances Ryan; four stars from Ben Dowell of The Times, The Daily Telegraph's Anita Singh, and the i's Gerard Gilbert; and three stars from The Independent's Cathy Reay.

Carr's sense of humour in the documentary was picked up by reviewers: Dowell was surprised to find the documentary "quite so funny", highlighting her commentary on the tropes of similar activist works. This was contrasted against the consensus that some scenes were disturbing, such as the conversation with the Canadian doctor and a recording from the MAID automatic helpline. Barbara Ellen of The Observer said that Better Off Dead? "unnerves you so much you half-wish you hadn't seen it".

In her review, Reay wished that there was greater diversity in interviewees but called it "compelling"; Ellen agreed with her criticism, wondering why the terminally ill were not involved.
