= Latosol =

Soil type

Latosols, also known as tropical red earth, are soils found under tropical rainforests which have a relatively high content of iron and aluminium oxides. They are typically classified as oxisols (USDA soil taxonomy) or ferralsols (World Reference Base for Soil Resources). Latosols are tropical soils, but not all soils in the tropics are latosolic. Latosols are red or yellowish-red in colour throughout and they do not have distinct horizons like a podsol. The red colour comes from the iron oxides in the soil. They are deep soils, often extending 20–30 m (66–98 ft) deep whereas podsols are 1–2 m (3 ft 3 in – 6 ft 7 in) deep.

The soil generally contains a thin but very fertile layer of humus dropped from plants and animals in the forest above, followed by an infertile second layer due to rapid leaching caused by high rainfall. The third level, weathered bedrock, is common to almost all soil types.

The latosol is completely reliant on the rainforest to maintain fertility, as all nutrients leach away quickly when the forest is felled and the layer of humus is no longer being replaced.

== See also ==
- Red soil
