= Red Earth (company) =

Australian company

- Industry: Cosmetics
- Founded: 1989; 37 years ago
- Headquarters: Australia
- Website: Official site

Red Earth is the name of an international chain of stores selling cosmetics and body care products.

It was founded in Australia in 1989 as an environmentally aware alternative to mainstream companies, taking a similar line to the UK company The Body Shop. Since then it has become a fashion-following colour cosmetics brand.

The first shop was in the Melbourne Central complex in Melbourne, Australia. Red Earth now operates a number of stores across major cities in Australia and New Zealand. In 1993, it moved into the Asian market, opening stores in Hong Kong and Singapore. Since then, Red Earth has expanded into Canada, Thailand, the Netherlands, the United Kingdom, the United Arab Emirates, China, the United States, Pakistan, and Japan.

In 2001, the company was purchased by Esprit. As a result, Red Earth products are also widely available in Esprit stores. In 2003, it also moved into the department store market, starting in New Zealand.

During the financial year ended on 30 June 2009, Esprit disposed the non-core, loss-making Red Earth brand and related operations.

Red Earth is present in over 20 countries with more than 1,000 stores.

== See also ==
- Movit
- Adore Beauty
- Body Organics
- SimplySiti
