= The Fades (TV series) =

2011 British supernatural drama television series

- Genre: Supernatural drama Horror
- Created by: Jack Thorne
- Starring: Iain De Caestecker; Joe Dempsie; Natalie Dormer; Tom Ellis; Johnny Harris; Daniel Kaluuya; Lily Loveless; Sophie Wu; Daniela Nardini
- Composer: Paul Thomson
- Country of origin: United Kingdom
- Original language: English
- No. of series: 1
- No. of episodes: 6

Production
- Executive producer: Susan Hogg
- Producer: Caroline Skinner
- Running time: 60 minutes

Original release
- Network: BBC Three; BBC HD
- Release: 21 September – 26 October 2011

The Fades is a British supernatural drama television series created and written by Jack Thorne. The six episodes were first broadcast on BBC Three and BBC HD beginning 21 September 2011 and on BBC America from 14 January 2012. In April 2012, Johnny Harris confirmed that a second season had not been commissioned.

== Plot ==
Paul, a student with a history of bedwetting, is haunted by apocalyptic dreams. He is able to see spirits of the dead, known as the Fades, all around him. The Fades cannot be seen, smelt, heard or touched by other humans – they are what is left of humans who have died but have not been able to ascend, because the ascension points on Earth have been closing, and few can go through the ones that are still open. Because of this, the Fades left on Earth have become embittered and vengeful toward the human race, and have since developed a way to become partly human again and regain control of touch within the real world. They remain unseen in the world except to those special few like Paul, called "Angelics", who have the ability to perceive the Fades. Paul finds himself pulled into a conflict between the Angelics and the Fades, trying to prevent the Fades from regaining physical form and destroying the human race.

== Production ==
Filming took place at various locations in Hertfordshire, England. The school scenes were filmed at Queens School, Bushey. The majority of the location filming took place in South Oxhey, Oxhey, Watford, Hemel Hempstead, and Hatfield. The abandoned shopping centre used in the first episode is Oriental City in London.

== Awards and nominations ==
The Fades won the BAFTA Award for Best Drama Series in 2012.

== Characters ==
- Paul Roberts (Iain De Caestecker) Paul, the 17-year-old protagonist who discovers he is an Angelic, a human being who can perceive Fades, the spirits of the living who have not moved on to the afterlife.
- Michael "Mac" Armstrong (Daniel Kaluuya), Paul's best friend.
- Neil Valentine (Johnny Harris), an Angelic and Paul's mentor.
- Sarah Etches (Natalie Dormer), a Fade, who in life was an Angelic, and the wife of Mark.
- Mark Etches (Tom Ellis), Sarah's husband, and Paul's history teacher.
- Meg Roberts (Claire Rushbrook), mother of Paul and Anna.
- Anna Roberts (Lily Loveless), Paul's twin sister.
- Jay (Sophie Wu), Anna's best friend, who has a mutual attraction with Paul.
- John (Joe Dempsie), a Fade and the primary antagonist of the series.
- Natalie (Jenn Murray), a Fade, and follower of John.
- Helen (Daniela Nardini), an Angelic.
- DCI Armstrong (Robbie Gee), Mac's father and the detective working the cases of the dead and missing.
- Steve McEwan (Chris Mason), Anna's boyfriend.

== Episodes ==
No.	Episode	Directed by	Written by	Original release date	Viewers
1	Episode 1	Farren Blackburn	Jack Thorne	21 September 2011	867,000
Paul and Mac are in an old, abandoned shopping centre. Paul witnesses a supernatural creature attacking a man and a woman. The man (Neil) escapes with the woman (Sarah) to a trailer, but Sarah dies and Neil's eye is damaged in the fight. Helen comes to the trailer and attempts to heal Neil's eye, but is unable. Neil tracks down Paul and explains to him about the "Fades" who are the dead, trapped on earth and unable to pass on. Paul sees Sarah's spirit, filled with light, in a forest. Neil explains that Sarah, and the others they now see, are there because it is an ascension point, where they will either pass on, or the light will go out and they will become fades. Sarah's light goes out, and Paul collapses and has a vision of ash falling all over him, and him bleeding badly. At the trailer, the creature from the mall attacks and kills Helen.
2	Episode 2	Farren Blackburn	Jack Thorne	28 September 2011	575,000
3	Episode 3	Farren Blackburn	Jack Thorne	5 October 2011	582,000
4	Episode 4	Tom Shankland	Jack Thorne	12 October 2011	654,000
Paul's loved ones struggle in the aftermath of his accident. A stranger menaces the town.
5	Episode 5	Tom Shankland	Jack Thorne	19 October 2011	702,000
6	Episode 6	Tom Shankland	Jack Thorne	26 October 2011	698,000

== Reception ==
Michael Deacon, of The Telegraph newspaper, described the opening episode as "promisingly tense."

Writing for The Guardian, Ben Dowell commented that the series proved that "It is difficult not to watch BBC3 and E4 and think channels which target the under 35s are emerging as amongst the best places for boldness and innovation in UK TV drama."

== See also ==
- List of ghost films
