= Paul Hunt (activist) =

UK disability rights activist (1937–1979)

- Paul Hunt
- Born: March 9, 1937; Angmering, Sussex, United Kingdom
- Died: July 12, 1979 (aged 42); London, United Kingdom
- Occupations: activist, disability rights activist
- Years active: 1956-1979
- Notable work: Stigma, Disablement

Paul Hunt (1937 – 1979) was an early disability rights activist and leader of disabled people's campaigns in the UK against residential institutions and for independent living. He was born on 9 March 1937 in Angmering, Sussex, with an impairment and he died aged 42 years in London, on 12 July 1979. His work and political influence is now cited in academic and political writings.

Hunt disliked having his photograph taken and shunned publicity. It was only after his death that the impact of his writings, campaigning, leadership, and achievements began to be documented.

== Early life ==
Paul Hunt had six sisters. His mother taught him to read, and he attended the local church primary school for girls, followed by a mixed junior school. When he was eleven years old he was moved to start living in institutions. The first of these was St Mary's residential School for Handicapped Children in Bexhill-on-Sea. In 1951, aged 14 years, he broke a leg outside the family church while at home from school on the summer holiday. His father improvised his first wheelchair and he continued living at home for a few months, but soon he was moved to stay full-time at the Queen Mary's Hospital in Carshalton where he took his 'O level' exams two years later. Aged 16 years and no longer classed as a child he was moved again, to an adult hospital in London.

== "Founded on Failure", BBC ==
By the age of 18 years old Paul Hunt had been living in a "chronic" ward in St John's Hospital in Battersea, London, for two years, being left in bed most days - "amongst dying people, with no apparent future", and "He was surrounded by young lads dying ... and old men", wrote Judy Hunt (in archive papers, 2002, 2016).

It was here that he saw the Le Court residential home for disabled people being featured in a BBC TV documentary programme ("Founded on Failure", BBC, Tues 27 September 1955, 19:30hrs). There was also an accompanying article in the Radio Times, which included the statement that Le Court was a place where "discarded wrecks regained their self-respect". Despite such attitudes, Paul Hunt saw his chance to escape and he pressed hard for the authorities to transfer him there.

== Le Court ==
Le Court, now demolished, was near the towns of Liss and Petersfield in Hampshire, UK, and it was a residential institution run for disabled people. It was founded by Group Captain Leonard Cheshire after the Second World War, later becoming the Cheshire Foundation charity.

Paul Hunt became a resident (initially known as "patients" when he first arrived) at Le Court. He arrived there when he was 19 years old in July 1956 and by November that year he had been elected the treasurer of the Patients Welfare Committee. For eight years he was the chair or vice-chair of the Le Court Residents Committee. He left Le Court in 1970, after living there for 14 years and, with other residents, having changed its ethos substantially. He was 33 years old.

== Early campaigning ==
Within two years of arriving at Le Court, aged 21 years, Paul Hunt was actively involved in campaigning for the rights of disabled people. Papers in his archived Collection show he is negotiating for "patients" rights with the Chair of the Management Committee of Le Court in July and August 1958. In the 1960s he is involved with the Disablement Income Group (DIG) including a rare press photograph of him leading a DIG march and rally at Trafalgar Square, and he is in correspondence with the National Campaign for the Young Chronic Sick and with the General Secretary of the National Council for Civil Liberties (as was). Judy Hunt noted later (archive papers) that in the early 1960s Paul had a particular interest in the Civil Rights Movement run by Black people in the US, and that he found this analysis of discrimination and oppression to be a useful social tool.

== Books ==
Paul Hunt edited a book - Stigma - with chapters written by twelve disabled people which was published in 1966 by Geoffrey Chapman. Paul Hunt wrote the last of the chapters - A Critical Condition. In letters in 1964 asking certain disabled people to contribute a chapter each, Paul Hunt wrote:

- "'The book is intended as a forum where disabled people can reflect in depth on their situation. We are asking not for details of living with a particular disability or of practical difficulties connected with it, but rather for a discussion of what the basic fact of being disabled means in terms of personal and social problems, of relations with ‘normal’ society, and so on.'^{1}" (from Paul Hunt's unpublished draft introduction for Stigma, quoted in Judy Hunt (2007) "CLASSIC REVIEW," Disability & Society)

One substantial view of his contribution is by Frances Hasler: "As long ago as 1966, Paul Hunt was pointing out the gap between social responses to disability and disabled people's own sense of self. I think the distinguishing mark of disabled people's special position is that they tend to 'challenge' in their relations with ordinary society".

Paul Hunt wrote Chapter 5, Disablement, in the book, The New Poor: Anatomy of Underprivilege, edited by Ian Henderson and published in 1973. Talking about the recently passed Chronically Sick and Disabled Persons Act 1970, the private member's bill promoted by Alf Morris MP, Paul Hunt wrote:

- "It is to be hoped that the Act will in particular eventually prod local authorities into making more satisfactory provision for home care ... The Act has never been quite the charter for the future of the disabled that has been claimed. And the danger is that, with so much publicity giving the impression that a great deal more is now being done, it may tend to obscure the central question of income maintenance." (Hunt 1973, p108)

== UPIAS ==
Paul Hunt was a founder of the Union of the Physically Impaired Against Segregation (UPIAS) in 1972 and led the thinking in developing the social model of disability, as it became known. His letter published in The Guardian newspaper on 20 September 1972 proposing a union of disabled people against segregated living was a political turning point. In 1973 he wrote a nationally published article against the building of more Young Disabled Units (YDUs) in hospital grounds instead of accessible flats and houses with support. UPIAS closed in 1990.

Previously in the Cheshire Smile magazine produced at Le Court in 1968, Paul Hunt had written: "I have long felt the need for a more militant organisation for the disabled, one which is sensitive to the changing needs and wishes of its members" (quoted in archive papers).

In 1970 Paul Hunt had left Le Court and was living in a flat in London, and had married Judy (née McKeeman). They had one son, born in 1975. Paul Hunt was working as a computer programmer, as well as being a disabled activist, until his death in 1979.

During his lifetime Paul Hunt saw the beginnings of independent living campaigns coming to fruition, for example the Grove Road project in 1976 in Nottinghamshire.

== Legacy ==
Based on the social model of disability, there were Coalitions of Disabled People established including in Derbyshire (DCDP / DCIL / DDCIL, 1981–2018) and Greater Manchester (GMCDP, 1985- ), and the British Council of Organisations of Disabled People (BCODP, 1981–2017) which started the National Centre for Independent Living (NCIL, 1989–2011) as a project, which itself became a spin-out independent organisation in the early 2000s before merging with two other organisations to form Disability Rights UK in January 2012.

In 1981 one of his key articles, "Settling Accounts with the Parasite People", a critique of some academic research practices, was published posthumously from his notes. This article drew on Paul Hunt's bitter experience from 1962 at Le Court when residents had asked some academics to come in and support them, only to find the later published research commentary had fully turned against disabled residents.

== Archived papers ==
The papers of the Judy and Paul Hunt Collection are in the process of being added to the Disabled People's Archive in Manchester, UK, to be based at Archives+. This process has been delayed due to closures following the COVID-19 pandemic.
