= Greater Manchester Coalition of Disabled People =

British disability organisation

The Greater Manchester Coalition of Disabled People (GMCDP) was established in 1985, a membership organisation in the UK that is controlled by disabled people. GMCDP is regarded as being influential in the social, cultural, economic, and legal policy debates on a national stage that have impacted on disabled people, grounded in the Social Model of Disability. The GMCDP magazine Coalition was referred to in these debates, its articles being cited in academic textbooks as well as within the community. The history of GMCDP has been a microcosm of the history of the radical disabled people's movement in the UK since the 1980s, with GMCDP members often involved centrally and nationally.

== Origins ==
The first meeting, Strategies for a Coalition, was on Saturday 16 June 1984 with over 90 disabled people attending. It was an all-day meeting and held at the County Hall of the Greater Manchester Council (now an office block) on the corner of Piccadilly Gardens in Manchester. This meeting elected a Steering Committee that was tasked with agreeing a constitution (the rules on how to run the group) and to start looking for funding. Much of the support work behind this event and the steering committee came from two community development workers employed at the Greater Manchester Council for Voluntary Service (later called GMCVO), Dorothy Whitaker and Val Suffolk.

The idea for GMCDP came from a group called the Greater Manchester Disability Action Group which had discussions with radical disabled people like Ken Davis and Maggie Davis at the Derbyshire Coalition of Disabled People (1981-2018), and from regional events during and after the United Nations' International Year of Disabled Persons in 1981. The name of GMCDP was in use from July 1984 onwards.

Around half of the founder members of GMCDP were also members of the Union of the Physically Impaired Against Segregation (UPIAS, 1972–1990) and the Social Model of Disability was central to the design of GMCDP. Many of the UPIAS members who lived in and around Manchester also met together within the Manchester Disabled Athletes (MDA) sports club where further private discussions were possible concerning the formation of GMCDP. In particular, it was agreed that GMCDP would be registered as a company but not also as a charity, so that future campaigning would not be compromised. A funding application to the Greater Manchester Council for an Urban Aid grant of £27,350 revenue and £10,000 capital for a Greater Manchester Resource / Information Centre for Disabled People was drafted by the group, showing Lorraine Gradwell as the committee secretary. A basic typed leaflet describing GMCDP was also circulated in October 1984.

One example of the ways of working of the GMCDP Steering Group was the organising of an open meeting called, Politics of Disability, 7.30pm Friday 8 February 1985 at the Health Education Centre, Hardman Street, Manchester (now Spiningfields). Vic Finkelstein was noted as a speaker, as Chair of the British Council of Organisations of Disabled People (BCODP). The agenda-setting discussion was a few weeks earlier, 24 January 1985, between Kevin Hyett and Lorraine Gradwell while at the MDA club evening meet at Stretford sports centre. Because it was an open meeting it was decided beforehand that it would not be a policy-making meeting. Steering Group meetings were often held at the Health Education Centre at Hardman Street (one of the few accessible meeting venues at the time) each month on a Friday evening.

The Inaugural Meeting of GMCDP took place on Saturday 22 June 1985 at the County Hall of the Greater Manchester Council, at which point the Steering Committee ended and the first Executive Council was elected The meeting included a number of smaller discussion groups, including on education, access, and employment.

== Membership ==
The GMCDP Steering Group decided at the outset that the membership would be only open to individual disabled people who support its aims, and not also to any disability organisations, to prevent GMCDP being overwhelmed by any larger, better-resourced organisations which were not following the social model of disability. Associate membership was allowed for non-disabled people, for organisations, and junior members aged under 16 years. It was also agreed that the officers (chair, secretary, treasurer, etc.) would be elected from the executive council and not from the full membership at an annual general meeting, which elected the executive council only.

An extract from the draft constitution in August 1984 states: "The Coalition aims to promote the full participation of disabled people in ensuring that they have the necessary facilities and support to live independently; to have control of their own lives, and to support all measures that seek to ensure that disabled people have the means to be fully integrated into society."

== 1980s ==
The first office was at 11 Anson Road, Rusholme, Manchester, in a temporary cabin in the car park of SERIS, the Special Education Resources and Information Service of Manchester City Council. There were three staff initially - a Clerical and Administrative Officer (Sue Stirling for a few weeks, then Thelma Tomlinson) and two Information and Publicity Workers (Ian Stanton, --- ), and a fourth worker recruited in 1986 as the Development Worker, later Team Leader (Lorraine Gradwell).

GMCDP staff and members were heavily involved in the establishment and running of the British Council of Organisations of Disabled People (BCODP, 1981–2017), both before and after GMCDP had become established.

=== Coalition magazine ===
The first publication by GMCDP as a staffed organisation was in February 1986. This was an Information News-sheet, which soon had a name-change to become Coalition News and then Coalition from June 1989 onwards. By 2019 there had been over 70 editions of the Coalition magazine. An Information Bulletin was issued for details of events and other announcements.

=== Accessible public transport (mass transit) ===
When GMCDP was formed, it included people and committees from some pre-existing single-issue disabled people's organisations and these included ADAPT, Action on Disabled Person's Transport - Greater Manchester Branch (1979–1985). In 1982 in outline and then in 1984 in detail, the public transport planners in Greater Manchester proposed that a new tram network should be funded and built, which later became known as Metrolink. Disabled people in ADAPT described themselves in minutes as very concerned to find that the proposed trams would not be accessible to disabled people. The proposal was for retractable steps to slide in and out under the doors of the trams for (non-disabled) people to climb on when boarding a tram. A meeting was held between the authorities and around 70 disabled people on 22 November 1984 to protest, and one of the speakers was the visiting disabled activist Vic Finkelstein.

The transport authorities continued to refuse these demands for a fully accessible tram system for three more years, up to another meeting with the authorities around May 1987, this time with over 100 disabled people protesting. By the summer of 1988 the principle of full access had been agreed and disabled people were invited to inspect a full-size mock-up vehicle and platform that had been built for consultation purposes.

=== Artability - protest and consequences ===
In July 1986, the Coalition magazine featured the campaign against and eventual cancellation of the Artability conference. The Carnegie Foundation had planned to hold a conference in Manchester on 22–24 September 1986 called, Artability - the way ahead for the arts and people with disabilities, to take forward the recommendations in the (Richard) Attenborough Report on the arts and disabled people. GMCDP and other organisations of disabled people had objected because they were not consulted, the venue for the conference was inaccessible, the philosophy of the conference was medical and therapeutic, and it was aimed only at non-disabled policy makers and excluded disabled people. When GMCDP persuaded Manchester City Council to withdraw its support for the planned conference, the Carnagie Council issued a statement and cancelled the event.

Following this, GMCDP worked with Manchester City Council and others to plan and run a better, alternative event, the Manchester Disabled People's Arts Conference held on 26–27 March 1988 at Manchester Town Hall, and a 39-page conference report was published by GMCDP in August 1988.

=== Accessible venues ===
In May 1987, GMCDP in conjunction with the Greater Manchester Council for Voluntary Service (GMCVS) co-produced a 61-page booklet, the Venue Guide for meetings and conferences in Greater Manchester, based on 500 questionnaires issued. It was intended to highlight the very limited number of accessible venues, to encourage their wider use by event organisers, and to inform inaccessible venue managers on ways to improve their own access.

==== Manchester Town Hall campaign ====
In the early 1980s, Manchester Town Hall was inaccessible to disabled people. Every entrance had steps, there was one tiny lift once inside, no accessible toilets, no hearing aid induction loops, no Braille signage. Disabled people's organisations such the Manchester Disability Forum and GMCDP had called for full access to the 'corridors of power' but were being told it wasn't possible because the town hall was a listed building, which the groups considered to be an ill-informed response. The Manchester Town Hall Extension, built in the 1930s, was slightly better for access, though both the link bridges between the buildings contained steps, barriers to access.

GMCDP and Manchester Disability Forum believed that they had secured a political understanding with Manchester City Council that the council would commit to making the 'old' Town Hall fully accessible as soon as possible, and that in the meantime no public meetings would be held there. However, disabled people were angry to find that this agreement had been broken when an exhibition of the Trades Union Congress was held in the town hall alongside the TUC's annual conference nearby. When the exhibition organisers refused to use an alternative accessible venue, GMCDP organised a picket of disabled people at the town hall entrances, including placards saying which trade unions they belonged to, and many TUC delegates refused to cross the line. Kevin Hyett and others later said, this was the moment when elected councillors realised that GMCDP was as political as they were.

=== Benefits cuts and protests ===
Some members of GMCDP went to the major protest and rally of disabled people on 28 July 1988 at the Elephant and Castle, London, marching on the headquarters of the Department of Health and Social Security (DHSS) against the cuts by the Conservative government of Margaret Thatcher to disabled people's benefits. This campaign resulted in a u-turn on the cuts, and soon afterwards the creation of the Independent Living Fund. This major protest was celebrated by the disabled poet, Simon Brisenden, in The Battle for the Elephant and Castle. (Simon Brisenden was a founder member of Southampton Centre for Independent Living, now Spectrum CIL.)

== 1990s ==
=== First youth project ===
In 1990 GMCDP launched its first project specifically for young disabled people under 25 years old. GMCDP has run various Young Disabled People's Projects continuously since then, including young disabled people taking part in independent living skills training, drama workshops, the Kulture Klub social club and through information provision sessions.

In July 1997 GMCDP and project funders published a training pack of a film (VHS tape) and paperback book, Independent Living Skills: A training manual for young disabled people, by Alison Blake, the project worker.

=== Disability Action Training ===
The GMCDP Disability Action Training (DAT, 1990–1994) project offered training to both disabled and non-disabled people in disability equality, job-seeking skills and training the trainers in order to build up a pool of quality trainers. The name was deliberately 'action training' not 'awareness training' to emphasise the changes that were expected from organisations as a result of receiving the training.

=== Block Telethon 92 ===
GMCDP members played a part in the protest by over 1000 disabled people in London outside the LWT television studios used for the 18–19 July 1992 broadcast of the charity fundraising Telethon event, claiming that the methods being used were demeaning to disabled people.

Ian Stanton, a GMCDP worker and disabled musician, performed the newly written song, A Message From Telethon (to you) written by himself and Cathy Avison, another GMCDP member. Lorraine Gradwell, another GMCDP worker, had a letter published in The Guardian newspaper that morning calling on disabled people to support the protest. Natalie Markham, another GMCDP worker and disabled artist, spoke from the platform and wrote in Coalition that GMCDP organised two accessible coaches from Manchester to get members to the protest.

Two of the main organisers of this protest (and the previous smaller protest against this Telethon in 1990) were Alan Holdsworth, and Barbara Lisicki, who also wrote on the Telethon protests in Coalition. With other disabled people involved in the 1992 protest they formed the Disabled People's Direct Action Network (DAN) in 1993.

=== "Thoughts and Reflections" ===
In 1996 a film (VHS tape) of interviews with members was completed, Thoughts and Reflections on the Greater Manchester Coalition of Disabled People, to mark the 10th anniversary of the organisation. Those interviewed include Ken Lumb, Dorothy Whitaker, Kevin Hyett, Lorraine Gradwell, Neville Strowger, Martin Pagel, Ian Stanton, Thelma Tomlinson, Angela Madeley, Linda Marsh, Brian Hilton, Audrey Stanton and Alison Blake. A digital copy of the film is embedded in the GMCDP website on the history page.

=== Anti-Discrimination Legislation ===
GMCDP was involved in the extensive campaigning in the first half of the 1990s for a new law to prevent discrimination against disabled people. This was a concerted effort for civil rights across a number of campaigning organisations, including the British Council of Organisations of Disabled People (BCODP) and Disabled People's Direct Action Network (DAN).

== 2000s ==
=== Disabled People's Refugee Project ===
One of the innovative projects run by GMCDP was the Disabled People's Refugee Project. This provided information, support and training in the areas of - services available from support organisations, building confidence, independent living, tech skills, peer support to participate in meetings to share experiences, and access to education and employment.

=== Young Disabled People's Forum ===
This project worked with young people aged up to 25 years from across Greater Manchester, and it worked with its sister project, the Young Disabled People's Forum Drama Group.

=== Information and Advocacy Unit ===
The Information and Advocacy Unit was launched on 17 April 2004 at Manchester Deaf Centre, and specialised in providing a customised information and a signposting service to individuals and groups across Greater Manchester, on issues such as housing, benefits, rights, transport, and leisure activities. Disabled people who lived or worked in Greater Manchester could telephone an information line or ask questions by email to the project team. Information days were held across Greater Manchester, and a Consultancy Service was available to organisations, and an Advocacy Service was offered one-to-one advocacy support to disabled people in Greater Manchester.

== 2010s ==
=== Youth work ===
In 2010, GMCDP started a five-year Lottery funded project, Including Young Disabled People, and in 2016 this work continued, now being called Shaping Our Inclusion.

Two youth projects were funded for the City of Manchester area only - the Manchester Young Disabled People's Project, and also the Manchester Young Disabled People's Forum which included Self Development and Well Aware.

Two other projects were the Equality Forum and LOL - Living Our Lives.

=== Right to Control pilot ===
Around 2010, there were a number of funding sources which could be paid to disabled people for various needs at home and in work, but sometimes these funds worked against each other. The idea of a 'Right to Control' was to attempt to give some co-ordination to these funds, and to put the disabled person at the centre of their planning. In 2010 Greater Manchester was chosen as one of the pilot trailblazer areas to try to implement a new way of combining the funding streams, known as the Right to Control.

One of these pilots was called the Manchester Area Partnership, which consisted of five of the ten local authorities (councils) in Greater Manchester: Bury, Manchester, Oldham, Stockport, and Trafford.

These five councils in Greater Manchester and JobCentre Plus and disabled people's organisations met for three years to try to get a new way of person-centered working in place. A 12-month extension to the pilots into 2013 was agreed after consultation, however Oldham council decided it would withdraw its involvement and left on 12 December 2012, and the eventual conclusion was that the various authorities, especially the national agencies, were too inflexible and the pilots ended in 2013.

=== Austerity ===
The decade of 2010 to 2020 was identified in public funding terms as a period of spending cuts and austerity. This UK government policy impacted on disabled people for over a decade, and especially on those of working age because of political manifesto exemptions given against benefits cuts for elderly people, as well as the impact with reduced public sector funding generally. Many disabled people's organisations (DPOs) were forced to close as the years of austerity ate away at any reserves, and although GMCDP had to retrench and reduce staffing numbers drastically it did manage to survive the decade.

=== Independent Living Fund ===
In March 2014, the Coalition government announced its plans to close the Independent Living Fund (ILF) in June 2015 and transfer the responsibilities on to local authorities without protecting the budget, which GMCDP was convinced would lead to cuts because social care in England and the UK was already failing. The campaign to save the ILF was supported by

- GMCDP (Greater Manchester Coalition of Disabled People)
- ALLFIE (Alliance For Inclusive Education)
- DPAC (Disabled People Against Cuts)
- Inclusion London and
- Equal Lives.

Unfortunately, the government continued with its plans and abolished the ILF despite these strong protests, and GMCDP continued with its campaigning for independent living for disabled people.

=== Disabled People's Manifesto ===
In 2017, GMCDP held an elections hustings event for the Greater Manchester inaugural mayoral candidates (those people wanting to be elected as a "metro mayor"), which focused on disabled people's issues. At the same time, GMCDP drafted a Disabled People's Manifesto alongside other disabled people's organisations throughout Greater Manchester which was sent to all candidates. In 2017 Andy Burnham was elected as the metro Mayor of Greater Manchester and in 2019 he set up a Disabled People's Panel (DPP) with GMCDP to continue the dialogue.

=== "Manchester Firsts" ===
In 2017, Lorraine Gradwell wrote an online article on the socially progressive roles taken by disabled people and allies in Greater Manchester within the wider disabled people's movement. She called it Manchester Firsts, written in response to attending a disability history meeting held at a university which she felt included too many glaring errors.

== 2020s ==
=== Covid-19 and Disabled People ===
The COVID-19 pandemic has encompassed the world, and the impact in the UK has been particularly severe, especially for disabled people. Many disabled people are in one of the following three categories of people who are especially susceptible to death as a consequence of infection:

1. clinically extremely vulnerable (shielding)
2. clinically vulnerable (isolating)
3. non-clinically vulnerable (lock-down).

While closing its office for staff safety reasons, GMCDP continued to work to support disabled people who might be increasingly isolated, and to support the campaigns of disabled people including on:

- The disproportionately high number of deaths in care homes which includes many disabled people of all ages living in institutions, as well as elderly people - for example the "excess deaths" of disabled people with learning difficulties or autism was reported in June 2020 as 134% above the five-year average, around four times higher than the rate of "excess deaths" in the general population.
- The lack of a British Sign Language interpreter at the daily news conferences at 10 Downing Street
- The blanket issuing of Do Not (attempt to) Resuscitate (DNR) statements by a minority of GP doctors and care home staff.
- The difficulties faced by disabled people in sourcing their own supplies of PPE (personal protective equipment) for carers and personal assistants (PAs)
- The difficulties in sourcing food and medicines, especially in the initial weeks of the national lock-down
- The additional mental health impacts on disabled people
- The difficulties some Deaf and disabled people have with using face masks and with face coverings, for example in needing to lip-read
- The difficulties some disabled people face when trying to maintain social distancing outdoors with some non-disabled people compromising the space needed.

== Administration ==
=== Offices ===
1. 11 Anson Road, Rusholme, Manchester M14 5BY
2. Cariocca Business Park, Ardwick, Manchester M12 4AH
3. Carisbrooke, Wenlock Way, Gorton, Manchester M12 5LF
4. BEVC, Aked Close, Ardwick, Manchester M12 4AN
5. Windrush Centre, 70 Alexandra Road, Moss Side, Manchester M16 7WD

=== Heads of staff ===
Lorraine Gradwell, Michele Scattergood (Brookes), Natalie Markham, Caron Blake (Peachey), Nicola McDonagh.

== Disabled People's Archive ==
GMCDP had moved offices a number of times in its first 15 years and the Executive Council were concerned that the growing number of older materials in boxes needed to be preserved and better stored. In September 2002 the Executive Council decided that an archive of the disabled people's movement "shall be a high priority for the organisation." In January 2003 GMCDP, together with Birmingham Coalition of Disabled People and Muscle Power, applied to the Heritage Lottery Fund (HLF) for a revenue grant and is successful, with GMCDP employing Brian Kokoruwe from April 2004 for twelve months. Catalogue files are created, and some of the boxes are put into secure storage at the Greater Manchester County Records Office (GMCRO). An application for a grant extension that included a desired new building for the archive was submitted but not approved, and later in June 2005 Brian Hilton was employed on a temporary basis with GMCDP's own funds. In 2006 GMCDP was revenue funded by HLF for an oral history project, Deaf and Disabled People from Ardwick, Manchester. This project produced 15 exhibition boards, each at A1 size.

Over the years further boxes of unique older materials continued to accumulate, and in the summer of 2013 GMCDP was required to move out of its offices in Aked Close, a large building shared with other DPOs which had been an important hub but was being closed due to local authority cuts making the rent unaffordable. GMCDP moved to smaller premises at the Windrush Centre and also rented a storage room in an old textiles mill in east Manchester to hold the bulk of its archive of seven filing cabinets (28 drawers), 68 storage boxes and some large objects including banners.

As part of Disability History Month 2015, the People's History Museum (PHM) was funded by Scope to run an exhibition, The Hidden History of Disabled People's Fight for Civil Rights, which had an accompanying article in The Guardian newspaper but using some GMCDP archive material. Following representations after this event, PHM agreed to work in future with GMCDP and disabled people under the banner, Nothing About Us Without Us.

In May 2016, a GMCDP volunteer starts to make a high-level general list of the contents of each box and drawer, and to label each one. Later in 2016 staff in Archives+ ("archives plus") agree to take these organised materials into safe custody, adding to the previous boxes stored at the GMCRO. With the materials in a more manageable state, GMCDP employed Linda Marsh on a fixed-term contract to start making a detailed catalogue of the archive prior to opening it to the public.

In June 2019, GMCDP produced an edition of the Coalition magazine entirely on its archive. GMCDP stated its commitment to making this extensive archive fully accessible to activists and to researchers.

In October 2021 GMCDP was granted funds from the Wellcome Trust to expand the project with three staff for three years, extended some months due to delays following the pandemic. A large element of this work was in starting to catalogue the main collection and to make the records fully accessible in multiple formats. In July 2020, the Executive Council of GMCDP agreed that the Archive Development Project should be renamed as the Disabled People's Archive to reflect the growth of the archive with around 30 other collections in addition to GMCDP's own materials.

== See also ==
- Manchester Disabled People's Access Group
