= Manchester Disabled People's Access Group =

Manchester Disabled People’s Access Group (MDPAG) is a disabled people's organisation (DPO) based in Manchester, England. Its aim is to promote best practice in inclusive design and accessibility standards for disabled people to access buildings, transport, public spaces, events, information and services, across Greater Manchester and the wider UK, based on the social model of disability and the principle of removing barriers within society. Its work has underpinned the civic ambition of the City of Manchester to become a fully accessible city. Key to achieving this ambition were the fully integrated Commonwealth Games 2002 and the publication of "Design for Access 2".

== Origins and early years ==
The values and objectives of MDPAG were established in 1998 and emerged in Greater Manchester from the grassroots disability activism in the area rooted in the changes within the disabled people's movement which first gained prominence in the UK in the 1970s. In 1991 Manchester was reportedly the first UK local authority to adopt the Social Model of Disability. In terms of accessible buildings and their contribution to disabled people's independent living, the origins included the 1960s work of Selwyn Goldsmith, an architect who became disabled, developed further by the 1970s work of the Grove Road project and of Project 81.

=== 1984–88 Accessible trams ===
One of the predecessor organisations to MDPAG was the Greater Manchester Highways and Disability Group, and another was the Greater Manchester branch of ADAPT (Action for Disabled People's Access to Public Transport), which both merged around 1985 into the new, broader GMCDP. In 1984 the Chair of ADAPT had a letter published in 'Modern Railways' magazine demanding that the proposed Metrolink tram system be built to be "accessible to all groups". A meeting on access was held at Greater Manchester County Hall in November 1984 and Vic Finkelstein attended and spoke from the floor. In the May 1987 edition of GMCDP's 'Coalition' magazine Lorraine Gradwell wrote of the "disappointment" that the Greater Manchester Passenger Transport Executive (GMPTE) had refused to commit to full access. However after more campaigning, by the summer of 1988 the commitment was in place and a full scale 'mock up' of a tram was built inside a bus garage for disabled people to examine as part of a full consultation.

=== 1989 - Accessible taxis ===
MDPAG members had campaigned during the 1980s for the local authority to require black cab taxis in the city to be wheelchair accessible, and in 1989 a legal precedent was set in the civil courts for England and Wales which meant that local licensing authorities could require full wheelchair accessibility as a condition of granting a hackney carriage ("black cab") taxi licence: R v Manchester City Council ex parte Reid and McHugh [1989] RTR 285 QBD. In 2005 Manchester City Council undertook further research into access and taxis, including consulting with disabled people's organisations and funding mystery shopping by disabled people, and published the findings in a 138-page report.

=== 1996 - Manchester Disability Forum closure ===
The non-profit Manchester Disability Forum Association Ltd (MDF) was a predecessor to MDPAG. When MDF closed in 1996 its funding from Manchester City Council was ring fenced for disabled people's organisations, and as a result MDPAG became established in 1998 with this funding.

Initially MDPAG was an unincorporated association, becoming a registered charity (1133526) on 12 January 2009 in order receive additional funding, also becoming incorporated as a company (06929240) on 10 June 2009, making it possible to receive National Lottery funds. From archived papers: in its initial years of operation while MDPAG was unincorporated, Breakthorugh UK Ltd agreed to enter contracts on behalf of MDPAG with clients seeking access surveys, and then pay the survey fee to an MDPAG member on a self-employed consultant basis.

== Activities and wider influences ==
=== Access 2000 Strategy ===
The hosting of the Commonwealth Games in 2002 was used by Manchester City Council to underpin the urban regeneration / renewal of East Manchester and to progress the commitment of the city to be an international leader in urban accessibility for disabled people including visitors. Key elements of this ambition was (a) the 'Access 2000 Strategy' supported by the first edition of the 'Design for Access' resource booklet, and (b) the building of the new City of Manchester Stadium (later the home for Manchester City Football Club) to the highest standards at the time of disability access. In particular, "The XVII 2002 Commonwealth Games ... was the first major international multi-sport event to include elite athletes with disabilities (EADs) in its main sports programme and medal table."

"The Strategy details physical and sensory accessibility to buildings controlled by the Council and within those buildings. It is also concerned with accessibility in streets, in public open spaces and in areas between and around buildings. ... Manchester City Council is committed to providing a city which is accessible to all, and in which all sectors of the community are able to play a full and rewarding part in the life of the city."

and

"The Strategy was implemented during the year 2000 due to the imminent opening of the Commonwealth Games being hosted by the city. This was the first integrated major international athletics event, where disabled and non-disabled athletes would be competing in the same stadium. The Council's aims were to ensure that all visitors athletes and supporters, disabled and [non-disabled] could make the fullest use of the city's attractions."

=== 2003 - Design for Access 2 ===
The first edition of "Design for Access" booklet was published in January 2000, a 77-page booklet. It was heavily influenced by the detailed work and expertise of MDPAG and its members, and it dealt with many of the criticisms of 'Part M' of the building regulations as listed by the national Disability Rights Task Force. However the booklet needed revising after the British Standards Institute's BS 8300 was first issued in 2001. (BS 8300 was revised in 2009 and 2018.)

The second edition was published by Manchester City Council in December 2003, a 112-page booklet (pdf version). It was issued as Supplementary Planning Guidance (SPG) and became a "material consideration" in decisions concerning planning permission and the built environment. Its contents went beyond the "Building Regulations Part M" national standards and beyond the Lifetime Homes standard by including aspects such as the external urban environment, lighting, crossings, signage and way-finding, and engagement with disabled people specifically. It was referenced in publications by CABE (Commission for Architecture and the Built Environment) and fed into debates around Inclusive Design that culminated in Planning Policy Statement 1 (PPS1). "Design for Access 2" was cited as a resource in the Royal Institute of British Architects (RIBA) 2011 publication, "A Guide for Assisted Living".

=== 2006 - 'Gaps in Provision' project ===
In 2006 MDPAG in partnership with Breakthrough UK researched 22 voluntary and community organisations and 11 disabled people's organisations over a four month period in order to identify gaps in service provision that should be accessible to disabled people. This research included buildings, meetings and events, transport, way finding, printed materials and websites.

=== 2007 - Key Routes ===
Manchester City Council (MCC) started to provide a "Key Routes" service in the late 1980s, where disabled residents could specify key routes from their home, for example to the shops, train station, etc, and the routes would be surveyed and have their access improved if necessary, such as adding a dropped kerb / kerb cut. In 2005 an academic conference paper stated: "The MDPAG (Manchester Disabled People’s Access Group) carried out an access survey between 2002-2004 within the city centre 'key routes' defined by the City Council and found out that only 23.5% of the cafes, 25% of the banks, 38.3% of the shops, 61.5% of the hotels, and 73.7% of the tourist venues, pubs and restaurants, were accessible." In March 2007 MCC & MDPAG produced a report on the pilot phase of a more general approach to access across Manchester city centre.

=== 2008 - Urban Design Group ===
The Urban Design Group (UDG), covering England and Wales (not the USA one) published its report 'Design and Access Statements Explained'. Within the Acknowledgments (p6) they state that MDPAG "has advised on access issues in this guide." In 2012 a MDPAG trustee co-wrote an article for the UDG magazine on the conflicts between the localism policy and inclusive design principles.

=== 2012 to 2015 - Manchester Access and Inclusion Network (MAIN) ===
From archived papers: in September 2012 MDPAG received National Lottery (Reaching Communities) funding for a 3-year project to establish a network of disabled people who would be trained in providing expert guidance on removing barriers to buildings, the natural and built environment, transport, information, and services. A bespoke training programme was developed for MDPAG volunteers with the aim of some members gaining accreditation with the National Register of Access Consultants (NRAC).

=== 2016 - Our Manchester Disability Plan ===
In December 2016 the "Our Manchester Disability Plan" was launched by Manchester City Council with MDPAG as one of the invited organisations. This launch followed from the Plan's development over two years in co-production with disabled people including MDPAG. In terms of access work, an update report in 2017 noted:

"The Access workstream is the latest workstream to be established, the group’s aim is to look at two priority areas - the built environment (new and established), and access to information. The group’s aim is to work closely with MCC Planning and then develop relationships with a variety of organisation who are involved in developing the built environment across the city. The aim is to influence design and planning at the earliest possible stage, this will ensure the city gets things right in terms of access to the built environment."

=== Organisational changes ===
Based on its published Annual Reports, MDPAG has gone through a range of organisational changes, ranging at times between no staff up to a small team (2-3 staff) when funds permitted. Similarly the office base has changed to reflect the resources available, as shown below:

Office locations
Address	Dates
BEVC, Aked Close, Ardwick, Manchester, M12 4AN	1998 – April 2013
Kath Locke Centre, 123 Moss Lane East, Manchester, M15 5DD	April 2013 – July 2018
Citibase Manchester, Merchants Quay, Salford, M50 3SG	July 2018 – Sept 2019
c/o GMCDP, Windrush Millennium Centre, Alexandra Road, Manchester, M16 7WD	Sept 2019 – Dec 2023
(private home address)	Dec 2023 – present

== See also ==
- Greater Manchester Coalition of Disabled People
