= John Evans (activist) =

British disability rights activist (1950–2025)

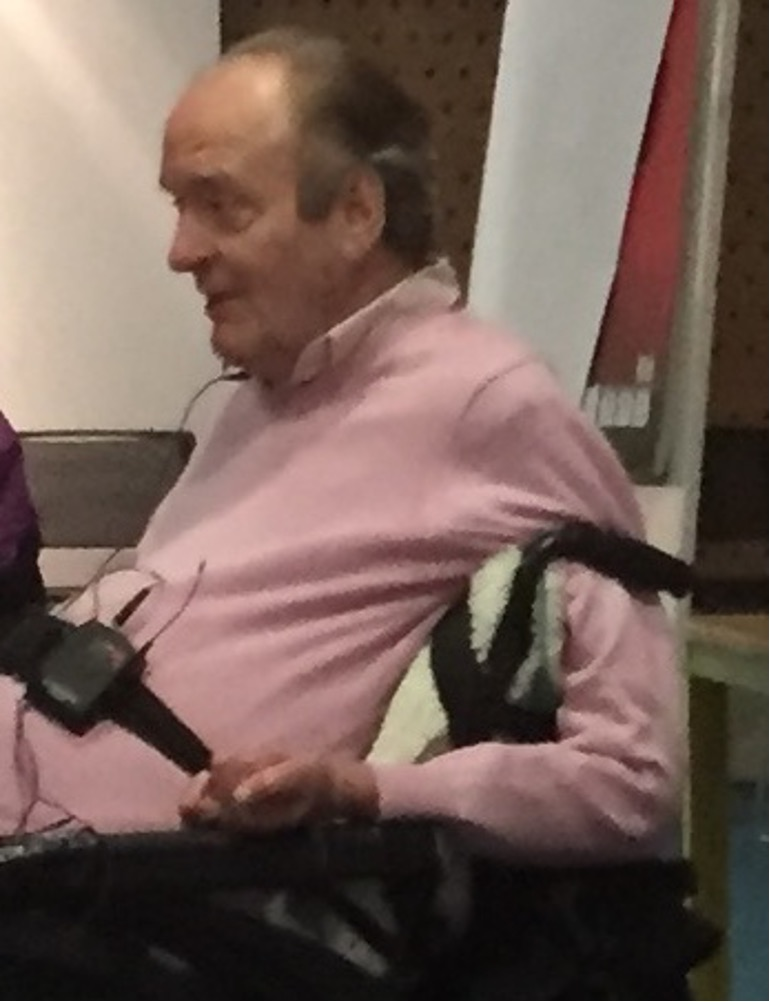
John Evans OBE

John Daniel Evans OBE (25 May 1950 – 13 January 2025) was a disabled person, campaigning since the 1970s for better social care to support disabled people’s independent living in the community. He is recognised for his pioneering international work with multiple awards. He held leadership roles in advocating independent living across Europe as well as working with the UK government, and formed a bridge between the EU and UK with the USA in sharing campaigning lessons and promoting best practice.

== Early life ==
Evans was born on 25 May 1950 in Swansea, and attended Dynevor Comprehensive School. (He later studied at the Open University in foundation courses in the arts and in social sciences, 1980–1984.)

He moved to London around 1968 aged 18 years and spent some time living in Toronto before returning to the UK and developing an interest in Sufism including meditation, leading to volunteering in a peace project in Jerusalem.

=== Accident ===
Evans was with the Sufi group when they decided to set up an Intensive Study Centre in Torreon, New Mexico in the Manzano Mountains near Albuquerque. After being there four months, aged 25 years, he broke his neck while exercising, resulting in permanent high-level paralysis. After five months in a local hospital he was flown back to London from Los Angeles, meanwhile having got to know people at the Center for Independent Living (CIL) in Berkeley, California.

Back in the UK he stayed at the spinal injuries unit at Stoke Mandeville hospital and then lived with two non-disabled friends in a cottage in the New Forest for eighteen months until that arrangement broke down in 1978.

=== Le Court, Hampshire ===
After living in the New Forest, Evans became a reluctant resident at the Le Court (pronounced “lee”) an institutional Cheshire Home in Liss, Hampshire, which he said he detested. It was closed in 2007 and the land sold for new housing.

His campaigning for independent living was based on his experiences as a resident in this Home with its restrictive environment and lack of autonomy. With fellow residents he set up initiatives to support disabled people leaving institutional care to live independently with funded support for personal assistants (PAs). This move marked an important starting point in the independent living movement in the UK.

=== Project 81 ===
Evans held a leadership role in the Project 81 group, founded in 1979 initially of residents at Le Court who sought to escape the confines of institutional living. Other members included Philip Mason, Tad Polkowski, Philip Scott and Liz Briggs. This group was later described by the disabled musician Ian Dury as, “The Escape Committee”. The project’s name was inspired by the United Nations' International Year for Disabled People in 1981, and its members aimed to demonstrate that people with severe impairments could live independently with state financial support to pay for personal assistants.

Evans returned to the USA, now as a wheelchair user with a personal assistant, for six weeks to record interviews (later transcribed) with 32 people in the independent living movement, including Judy Heumann and Ed Roberts. He also visited the Grove Road independent living project in Derbyshire, founded in 1976 and established a lifelong friendship with Ken and Maggie Davis.

Although some founder members of the radical UPIAS campaign lived in Le Court in the 1960s and early 1970s, for Evans and the Project 81 group “the social model was not an influence”, even though “Paradoxically, the origins of [Hampshire CIL] were also rooted in the struggles of the Le Court Cheshire Home. Hampshire CIL did formally adopt the social model of disability by 1990.

=== First International Conference on Independent Living ===
Evans attended the first International Conference on Independent Living held in Munich, Germany, in 1982. It brought together for the first time disabled people interested in independent living, mainly from America, Germany, Sweden and the UK. This led to conferences in Sweden in 1983 and in the UK shortly afterwards.

Evans left Le Court in December 1983 to move into his own maisonette in nearby Petersfield, Hampshire, with a support package paid by the local authority via Le Court. At the time local authorities were forbidden to pay disabled people directly, so payments were often routed through a non-profit organisation.

=== Hampshire and Derbyshire CILs ===
In 1984 Evans and other disabled people, including its founder Simon Brisenden and Neil Slatter, helped establish the user-led Hampshire Centre for Independent Living (CIL), said to be the first of its kind in the UK, followed closely by Derbyshire CIL in 1985. This network soon extended to Nottingham, Bristol, Islington, Lambeth, Greenwich, and Lothian in Scotland.

=== Protest on disability benefits cuts ===
Evans was one of the organisers of the protest march of disabled people on 28 July 1988 which converged on the DHSS head office at the Elephant and Castle, London. This was to challenge the government cuts in a state disability benefit (Domestic Care Allowance), and as a result of this campaigning the government set up a new fund – the Independent Living Fund (ILF). In 2012 and 2013 he campaigned to stop the ILF being abolished, saying "Over the years we have seen independent living transform the lives of so many disabled people from passive recipients to active citizens and employers.”

=== European Network on Independent Living (ENIL) ===
Established in April 1989 at a meeting in Strasbourg, the European Network on Independent Living (ENIL) was created when around 80 disabled people from around 14 countries converged on the European Parliament to discuss independent living and decided to establish a permanent network. He was the ENIL President for 14 years from 1996 to 2010.

Evans was on the Board of Directors of both the European Network on Independent Living (ENIL), and the European Disability Forum (EDF) from 1996 until 2014. He was one of the founding members of the European Coalition of Community Living (ECCL).

Evans collaborated with international organisations and participated in significant global events concerning independent living, such as the Washington Declaration in 1999. He was a policy advisor at the EU Agency for Fundamental Rights, 2010–2012; and to the European Commission, 2006–2008.

=== BCODP - Independent Living Committee, then NCIL ===
In 1989 Evans chaired the Independent Living Committee of the British Council of Organisations of Disabled People (BCODP) and, inspired by the Strasbourg launch of ENIL, he helped start a campaign for ‘direct payments.’ These payments would be from councils with a social services department and given directly to disabled people to employ their personal assistants, for home equipment and similar costs. At the time it was illegal for a local authority to make a payment for social care costs directly to a disabled resident in their area.

Evans helped BCODP commission the first researched publication on direct payments in the UK, called “Cashing In on Independence,” a major piece of research funded by the Joseph Rowntree Foundation and carried out by Gerry Zarb at the Policy Studies Institute with Pamela Nadash, published in 1994.

This evidence and campaigning demonstrated the cost-effectiveness of independent living compared to institutional care, leading to Parliament passing the Community Care (Direct Payments) Act 1996. Evans helped BCODP develop the committee that become known as the National Centre for Independent Living (NCIL) with Jane Campbell and Frances Hasler as its first co-directors in 1997. In 2003 NCIL was spun out as an independent organisation.

=== User-Led Organisations specialist ===
Evans was appointed at the Specialist in User-Led Organisations (ULOs) at the UK Department of Health for 2008–2010. He continued his work on ULOs with SCIE.

=== Social Care Institute for Excellence (SCIE) ===
Evans was a Board Trustee of SCIE (2016–2019) and the Chair of the SCIE Co-production Steering Group, and after the Care Act 2014 was passed into law he was involved in the annual SCIE Co-production Festivals from 2016 onwards. He also championed the work on personalisation. He helped set up the National Co-production Advisory Group (NCAG) in September 2009.

From 1991 he worked as a consultant, trainer and researcher as John Evans Disability Consultancy Services; for example involving a 17-day 3750-mile road trip across four European countries in the autumn of 2014. He was an editor of the international academic publication ‘Disability and Society’, and an ‘Expert by Experience’ and consultant for the CQC (Care Quality Commission).

=== Brexit and social care employment ===
Evans was publicly critical of the result of the Brexit referendum because of the increased difficulties faced by disabled people trying to recruit social care workers as personal assistants (PAs).

In 2023 he said there was an “already dwindling PA market following Brexit, the pandemic and now the rise in the cost of living ... It has never been more difficult finding new staff in my experience of 40 years of employing my own PAs ... This puts an enormous burden on us as well as an increase in stress because of the worries about remaining living independently that could result in the loss of our freedom."

== Recognition ==
- Evans' efforts were recognised with numerous awards, including an OBE award by Queen Elizabeth II in 2001.
- He was made an Honorary Fellow of the Centre for Citizens Participation at Brunel University.
- He was awarded the Silver Banner Award by the Tuscany regional government in Italy in 2003, the European Year of Disabled People, for his international work in independent living and human rights for disabled people.
- In 2014 the Spectrum CIL organisation published a book in recognition of his work – “From Le Court to Strasbourg: Fighting for Independent Living for 30 years”.

== Later years ==
In September 2018 he was given a diagnosis of terminal cancer, and shortly afterwards married his partner, Jana Bleckmann-Evans. He received palliative care for over six years while continuing to live independently in his home, which included distinctive Sufi artworks. He died on 13 January 2025 aged 74 years, after a short admission to hospital. His obituary appeared in the UK's Disability News Service.
