= Rosalie Wilkins, Baroness Wilkins =

British politician (1946–2024)

The Right Honourable The Baroness Wilkins
- Wilkins in Parliament in 2015

Member of the House of Lords
- Lord Temporal
- Life peerage 30 July 1999 – 23 July 2015

Personal details
- Born: Rosalie Catherine Wilkins; 6 May 1946 Chesham Bois, Buckinghamshire, England
- Died: 1 December 2024 (aged 78)
- Party: Labour

Rosalie Catherine Wilkins, Baroness Wilkins (6 May 1946 – 1 December 2024), was a British Labour politician, disability rights campaigner and television presenter.

== Early life ==
Wilkins was born in Chesham Bois, Buckinghamshire, England on 6 May 1946. She was one of four children. During sixth-form, Wilkins attended Dr Challoner’s Grammar School in Amersham.

While studying sociology and government at Manchester University in 1966, she fell from a moving vehicle and broke her neck. She was transferred to Stoke Mandeville Hospital for 6 months, where she followed an intensive rehabilitation programme in which she learnt to swim. She returned to complete her studies and graduated in 1971.

== Career ==
Wilkins worked for the Central Council for the Disabled (later becoming Royal Association for Disability and Rehabilitation). She also became involved with Disablement Income Group (DIG).

Wilkins was a member of the Central Health Services Council from 1974 to 1976, the BBC General Advisory Council from 1976 to 1978, and the Prince of Wales' Advisory Group on Disability from 1982 to 1990. She was an officer for National Centre for Independent Living by the end of the 1990s - a cause she was passionate about. She was also President of the College of Occupational Therapists from 2003 to 2008.

On 30 July 1999, she was created a life peer with the title Baroness Wilkins, of Chesham Bois in the County of Buckinghamshire. She was a member of the House of Lords until her retirement in 2015.

== Death ==
Wilkins died on 1 December 2024, at the age of 78.
