= Building for Life =

Building for Life, Building for Life 12, Adeliladu am Oes 12 Cymru (Building for a Healthy Life Wales) and Building for a Healthy Life are design tools for improving the quality of new homes and neighbourhoods used across England and Wales. The current version in use in England is Building for a Healthy Life (2020 edition).

The tool has changed and evolved over its twenty years of existence. The tool was rewritten in 2012 and published under the name "Building for Life 12". In 2020, the tool was updated and renamed "Building for a Healthy Life". These changes have enabled the tool to remain relevant, well-known, and well-used in a constantly changing economic, political, and regulatory climate.

== Building for Life 2001 - 2012 ==
Building for Life was launched in 2001 as a tool for assessing the design quality of homes and neighbourhoods in England. It was initially developed by the Commission for Architecture and the Built Environment (CABE) in partnership with the Home Builders Federation, the Civic Trust, and Design for Homes.

The Building for Life tool consisted of 20 questions, or criteria, to assess the design quality of new housing developments, resulting in a numerical score. The criteria reflect the importance of functionality, attractiveness, and sustainability in well-designed homes and neighbourhoods and were aligned to national planning policy at the time (which preceded the current National Planning Policy Framework).

This approach embodied by the criteria was based on national planning policy guidance and on urban design principles. The criteria also link to other standards for housing design, including the BREEAM EcoHomes standard, the Code for Sustainable Homes, Lifetime Homes, and Secured by Design.

Following the global credit crisis, there were fundamental changes in national governance that led to the abandonment of the 20 point version of Building for Life in favour of a new 12 point version being created.

In 2021, Building for a Healthy Life was managed by Design for Homes and Urban Design Doctor with endorsement from the Home Builders Federation, Homes England, Urban Design Group, and Living Streets. Living Streets endorsed the tool in 2021 and its logo featured on the 2022 edition of Building for a Healthy Life.

== Uses ==
Uses for Building for Life include the following:

- The basis of development briefs written by developers and housing associations.
- A tool to assess compliance with quality standards, for projects being considered for public sector funding, or being built on publicly owned land.
- An assessment method included by local authorities developing local planning frameworks, core strategies and supplementary planning guidance.
- A framework for Design Teams to structure Design and Access statements supporting their planning applications.
- Assessments by local authorities during pre-planning discussions and in reviewing planning applications.
- An auditing and monitoring tool, to allow local and national government to audit the quality of completed projects.
- An award scheme aimed at showcasing and celebrating better quality housing projects after completion.
- A best practice resource, through the website and case study library.

== History ==
In 2001, the director of the Civic Trust, Mike Gwilliam, approached the Home Builders Federation with an idea to showcase the best of new housing. They shared with CABE the aim of promoting high quality design, and CABE's chief executive, Jon Rouse, supported the initiative. The three organisations entered into a formal partnership and invited architect and urban designer Sir Terry Farrell to chair a panel of experts to take the initiative forward.

This panel included Martin Bacon, David Birkbeck, Keith Bradley, Steve Lidgate, Kelvin MacDonald, Dr John Miles, Dickon Robinson, Jon Rouse, Julian Smith, Peter Studdert, and David Taylor.

The Building for Life campaign was launched on 11 September 2001 with a manifesto, aiming to promote design excellence, to showcase the best of practice in the house building industry, to understand the needs and aspirations of home buyers, and to identify barriers to good design in order to remove them.

At a meeting on 13 December 2001, Design for Homes became an advisor to the partnership in recognition for the considerable time and effort that David Birkbeck and Richard Mullane had contributed to the initiative. Subsequently, Design for Homes produced a website on behalf of the partnership, www.buildingforlife.org, showcasing 10 very different schemes showing how housebuilding could excel in many different ways, provided it had adequate urban design manners and reasonable public and private amenity.

Key principles of good urban design had been documented in a variety of ways including in By design: urban design in the planning system towards better practice (2000).:

Objectives of Urban Design

- Character A place with its own identity
- Continuity and enclosure A place where public and private spaces are clearly distinguished
- Quality of the public realm A place with successful outdoor areas
- Ease of movement A place that is easy to get to and move through
- Legibility A place that has a clear image and is easy to understand
- Adaptability A place that can change easily
- Diversity A place with variety and choice

Aspects of Development Form

- Layout: urban structure The framework of routes and spaces that connect locally and more widely, and the way developments, routes and open spaces relate to one another
- Layout: urban grain The pattern of the arrangement of street blocks, plots and their buildings in a settlement
- Landscape The character and appearance of land, including its shape, form, ecology, natural features, colours and elements, and the way these components combine
- Density and mix The amount of development on a given piece of land and the range of uses. Density influences the intensity of development, and in combination with the mix of uses can affect a place's vitality and viability.
- Scale: height Scale is the size of a building in relation to its surroundings, or the size of parts of a building or its details, particularly in relation to the size of a person. Height determines the impact of development on views, vistas and skylines.
- Scale: massing The combined effect of the arrangement, volume and shape of a building or group of buildings in relation to other buildings and spaces
- Appearance: details The craftsmanship, building techniques, decoration, styles and lighting of a building or structure.
- Appearance: materials The texture, colour, pattern and durability of materials, and how they are used.

In 2002 the criteria used for the case studies were:

- Continuity and enclosure
- Legibility
- Character
- Ease of movement and layout
- Connections
- Travel choices
- Streets and spaces
- Density and mix
- Maintenance
- Safety
- Disabled access
- Parking
- Community facilities

The case study selection criteria needed to codify what was being celebrated. There was a need to clearly state on what basis the case studies were chosen. A set of questions was produced turning principles from several publications into shorthand, notably English Partnerships' "Urban Design Compendium", By design: urban design in the planning system towards better practice, and Urbed's "Building the 21st Century Home". The author of these was Design for Homes' David Birkbeck who worked with CABE's Dr Edward Hobson and proposed them to Home Builders Federation's Mark Rice. These 20 questions were eventually published as the Building for Life criteria in July 2003, following input from the Civic Trust's Liz Wrigley and CABE's Alex Ely.

In 2003, ten housing developments were celebrated with the Building for Life awards, on the basis of their good performance against the Building for Life criteria, and Wayne Hemingway replaced Sir Terry Farrell as chairman of the panel.

Over the period 2004 to 2007, Building for Life was used as the basis for the first national audit of housing design quality, which highlighted the inadequate quality of much of England's newly built housing.

While Building for Life was initially applied to completed housing developments, in 2003 CABE also developed and encouraged its use as means of achieving good design during the planning process.

English Partnerships adopted Building for Life for use as a standard in September 2005, requiring proposals for development on land they owned to achieve 14 out of the 20 criteria at tender disposal stage. They also required schemes to be submitted to the Building for Life awards when they were 50% complete.

In April 2007, the Housing Corporation published its design and quality standards, which incorporated Building for Life as the assessment method for the external environment. All new homes which received grant funding through the National Affordable Housing Programme were required to achieve 12 out of the 20 criteria. The Housing Corporation also carried out an audit of the quality of affordable homes built prior to the adoption of the new standards. The Housing Corporation also published guidance from HATC Ltd on how to achieve the requirements of Building for Life, aimed at housing association Development staff i.e. project managers rather than designers.

In 2008, the Department for Communities and Local Government commissioned CABE to check on progress and provide an independent view of quality in the Thames Gateway. CABE carried out a quality audit using Building for Life. The government's aspiration was that in 2010, no scheme in the Thames Gateway should achieve fewer than 10 criteria out of 20, and at least 50% of schemes should achieve more than 14 out of the 20 criteria. By 2015, 100% of schemes in the Thames Gateway should achieve a score of 14 out of the 20 criteria.

In 2008, the government requested that local authorities use Building for Life to measure progress in improving design quality. In July of that year, Building for Life criteria were incorporated into the revised list of core output indicators published by the Department for Communities and Local Government, upon which local authorities were required to report.

To support the application of Building for Life by local authorities and others, the Department for Communities and Local Government commissioned CABE to deliver a programme to create a national network of accredited assessors across local authorities in England. CABE developed a training and accreditation programme and drafted a Code of Conduct which Accredited Assessors were required to sign up to. By the end of 2010, CABE had trained 497 local authority professionals and had accredited 301 assessors in 194 local authorities to carry out formal assessments.

In 2010, Homes and Communities Agency set out in their proposed core housing design and sustainability standards consultation plans to make achieving 14/20 of the Building for Life criteria mandatory.

The Homes and Communities Agency commissioned CABE to carry out Building for Life assessments of applications to the Kickstart Housing Delivery programme They funded one-day assessments of each application, on the basis of evidence submitted to the Kickstart programme; assessments were carried out by a group of around 40 built environment professionals, trained and supervised by CABE.

A number of local authorities adopted Building for Life. For example, in 2008 North West Leicestershire District Council used Building for Life as a design quality indicator for all new residential led developments of ten homes or more, requiring that 14 criteria must be met to meet the council's expectations. A decade later there is a marked uplift in design quality across the District.

By the end of 2010, a number of local authorities had integrated Building for Life into their policy framework in different ways. These included North Northamptonshire, Sheffield City Council, Ashford Borough Council, Southampton City Council, South Gloucestershire Council, East Dorset District Council, Mansfield District Council, North Lincolnshire District Council, Erewash Borough Council, North Kesteven District Council, Rushcliffe Borough Council, London Borough of Merton, Fylde Borough Council, Nottingham City Council and London Borough of Havering.

== The Building for Life standard ==
Building for Life standards were given to all entries to the Building for Life awards that scored more than 14/20. Schemes that scored 14/20 or 15/20 receive the silver standard while schemes scoring 16/20 or more received the gold standard.

By the end of 2010, 169 schemes had been identified as achieving a Building for Life silver or gold standard.

== The Building for Life awards ==
Schemes were entered for Building for Life awards each spring by developers, housing associations, architects or planners. Entries were formally assessed against the 20 Building for Life criteria and all those achieving 14 or more received either a silver or gold standard. Schemes achieving a Building for Life standard were shortlisted for the awards. An independent judging panel then selected outstanding schemes to receive a Building for Life award. The Judging panel was chaired by Wayne Hemingway. Since 2008, the Building for Life awards judging panel included Nick Raynsford MP, Lynsey Hanley, John Calcutt, David Pretty, Yolande Barnes, Steven Carr and Jane Briginshaw.

== The Building for Life criteria ==
The criteria fell into four categories, and were as follows:

Environment and community

01. Does the development provide (or is it close to) community facilities, such as a school, parks, play areas, shops, pubs or cafes?

02. Is there an accommodation mix that reflects the needs and aspirations of the local community?

03. Is there a tenure mix that reflects the needs of the local community?

04. Does the development have easy access to public transport?

05. Does the development have any features that reduce its environmental impact?

Character

06. Is the design specific to the scheme?

07. Does the scheme exploit existing buildings, landscape or topography?

08. Does the scheme feel like a place with distinctive character?

09. Do the buildings and layout make it easy to find your way around?

10. Are streets defined by a well-structured building layout?

Streets, parking and pedestrianisation

11. Does the building layout take priority over the streets and car parking, so that the highways do not dominate?

12. Is the car parking well integrated and situated so it supports the street scene?

13. Are the streets pedestrian, cycle and vehicle friendly?

14. Does the scheme integrate with existing streets, paths and surrounding development?

15. Are public spaces and pedestrian routes overlooked and do they feel safe?

Design and construction

16. Is public space well designed and does it have suitable management arrangements in place?

17. Do the buildings exhibit architectural quality?

18. Do internal spaces and layout allow for adaptation, conversion or extension?

19. Has the scheme made use of advances in construction or technology that enhance its performance, quality and attractiveness?

20. Do buildings or spaces outperform statutory minima, such as building regulations?

== Building for Life Accredited Assessors / Building for a Healthy Life Accredited Providers ==
The network was closed in 2010 following the dissolution of CABE.

In 2021, Building for a Healthy Life Accredited Providers were announced. Local planning authorities seeking to validate Building for a Healthy Life self-assessments are encouraged to look for the 'Accredited Provider' logo on assessments supporting planning applications.

Accredited Providers are members of the Design Network: Design North East Integrate Plus Places Matter Design: Midlands Design South East Design South West Urban Design London

Accredited Providers are also the authors of Building for a Healthy Life: David Birkbeck (Design for Homes), Stefan Kruczkowski (Urban Design Doctor Limited), Sue McGlynn (Sue McGlynn Urban Design), Phil Jones (PJA) and David Singleton (DSA).

== Building for Life 12 (2012-2020): the tool in the post CABE era ==
In 2012, Building for Life was rewritten by David Birkbeck and Dr. Stefan Kruczkowski in response to a significant changes in the planning system following the publication of the National Planning Policy Framework (CLG, 2012). The National Planning Policy Framework was part of a series of wider government interventions intended to stimulate house building and economic recovering following the global credit crisis. Building for Life 12 became reflective of the wider economic and political climate. During this period, CABE was dissolved as a result of a programme of major budgetary reductions across central and local government. Building for Life 12 originally featured the CABE/Design Council logo although this was a new unit established within the Design Council that adopted the CABE name. The Design Council CABE logo was subsequently removed from Building for Life 12 as the organisation directed its efforts into an alternative quality tool for new homes.

Government published design guidance was the subject of a major review of the planning system in England. The 'External Review of government planning practice guidance: report submitted by Lord Taylor of Goss More' (CLG, 2012) concluded that 'Better places to live By Design: A companion guide to PPG3' (2001) and 'By Design: Urban design in the planning system - towards better practice' be "cancelled" on the basis that, "the guidance contains principles of good design, but these aspects are considered to be well understood and mainstreamed in planning work". This reflected the declining emphasis that government was placing on the role of central and local government in regulating and championing design quality.

Birkbeck had been previously involved in the initiative. Kruczkowski had worked with CABE as an Enabler within the Urban Design and Homes Team; worked in local government and was a regular user of Building for Life within planning departments. Prior to CABE's dissolution, Kruczkowski has been commissioned by CABE to undertake a review of the initiative and this work later informed Building for Life 12. Following the closure of CABE, Birkbeck and Kruczkowski worked together to produce a new Building for Life that was appropriate to the post-CABE era.

Building for Life 12 was a new publication and reduced the number of Building for Life considerations from 20 to 12. This was partly achieved by consolidating a number of considerations. It was also partly in response to the government requiring that the new tool did not seek to impose additional or contradictory regulatory pressures on the house building industry with particular respect to building performance and internal space standard that it considered as being addressed by way of the Building Regulations and National Described Space Standards (2015).

In May 2018, the first doctoral thesis was published on Building for Life by Stefan Kruczkowski. Entitled 'Exploring the effectiveness of Building for Life in improving suburban residential design quality'. The research included the first regional housing quality audit completed since CABE's series of housing quality audits.

In 2019, Building for Life 12 was cited in the National Planning Policy Framework (Paragraph 129) and the National Design Guide.

== Adeliladu am Oes 12 Cymru / Building for a Healthy Life Wales (2015 - present) ==
In 2015, the Welsh Government and the Design Commission for Wales published Adeliladu am Oes 12 Cymru: Arwydd o le da I fyw ynddo.

== Building for a Healthy Life (2020 - present) ==
In 2020, Building for Life 12 was rewritten as Building for a Healthy Life following a partnership with NHS England and NHS Improvement. The authors were approached by NHS England and NHS Improvement that was seeking to disseminate the findings of its Healthy New Towns Programme. Key policy changes provided a further opportunity to promote active travel through Building for a Healthy Life, in particular: Department for Transport (2020) Gear Change: a bold new vision for cycling and walking, HMSO and Department for Transport (2020) Cycle Infrastructure Design, LTN 1/20. Other policy and practice influences were the government's increased focus on biodiversity new gain and water management.

Initial proposals were for the NHS to create and publish its own design tool although a decision was made to utilise the Building for Life 12 tool, updating this to place a greater emphasis on walking and cycling to encourage higher levels of physical activity. As part of this the title of the tool was changed from 'Building for Life 12' to 'Building for a Healthy Life'. The underlying principles contained in Building for Life 12 are embedded within Building for a Healthy Life.

Sue McGlynn (urban designer and co-author of Responsive Environments: a manual for designers), Phil Jones (expertise in traffic analysis, transport planning and street design; author of Manual for Streets) and David Singleton (Chartered Landscape Architect) joined the authorship team of Building for a Healthy Life.

Building for a Healthy Life is endorsed by NHS England, NHS Improvement, Homes England (government agency), Home Builders Federation, Design Network and the Urban Design Group. The tool is free to use. Whilst there are no accredited or licensed assessors, local planning authorities are advised to consider validating planning applications that offer a Building for a Healthy Life self-assessment.

In February 2021, the government referenced Building for a Healthy Life in the draft of the latest edition of the National Planning Policy Framework. The draft NPPF proposes replacing the current reference to Building for Life 12 with Building for a Healthy Life.

== Building for a Healthy Life considerations ==
Integrated neighbourhoods - 1. Natural connections 2. Walking, cycling and public transport 3. Facilities and services 4. Homes for everyone

Distinctive places 5. Making the most of what's there 6. A memorable character 7. Well defined streets and spaces 8. Easy to find your way around

Streets for all 9. Healthy streets 10. Cycle and car parking 11. Green and blue infrastructure 12. Back of pavement, front of home

Building for a Healthy Life is a design process structure, not a scoring system. The more green lights a scheme secures, the better place will be created.

Green light = go ahead. Amber light = try and turn to green. Red light = stop and rethink.

Ambers may be justified where circumstances are beyond a developer's control such as third part land ownership or constraints imposed by local highway authorities.

== Building for a Healthy Life validation and training ==
Local planning authorities can check the validity of planning applications presented against the Building for a Healthy Life considerations either internally (where local authority resources and expertise allow). Validation support and training is available to local planning authorities from the Design Network or the authors of Building for a Healthy Life.

== Building for a Healthy Life in national planning policy and local plans ==
National planning policy in England is the National Planning Policy Framework (NPPF) published by MHCLG. The current version of the NPPF (2019) recognises Building for Life 12. Building for Life 12 is also cited in the government's National Design Guide. In 2021, MHCLG published a draft version of the newest edition of the NPPF. The draft version cites Building for a Healthy Life.

Local planning authorities across the country have cited Building for Life 12/Building for a Healthy Life in local plans and/or supplementary planning documents. Local planning authorities do not require consent from the authors to do so, however local planning authorities are requested to advise Design for Homes if they are using the tool locally so an up to date usage map can be maintained.

== Examples of local applications of Building for Life 12/Building for a Healthy Life ==
Burton Joyce Parish Council and Gedling Borough Council (2015), Burton Joyce Neighbourhood Plan 2017-2028.

Hall, G. (2015) Building for Life 12 Independent Assessment, Fernwood, Nottinghamshire, Urban Forward Limited.

Durham County Council (2018) Draft Durham Building for Life 12 Supplementary Planning Document.

Maidstone Council (2018) Building for Life 12: Maidstone Edition, Design South East.

== Building for Life 12 / Place Alliance / Use of Building for Life 12 in published work ==
In 2020, Place Alliance published 'A Housing Design Audit for England'. The audit used questions similar to those in Building for Life 12 but the exact questions were modified by Place Alliance. This followed a decision by the authors of Building for Life 12 to not permit the use of their methodology on the basis of concerns about site selection and the robustness of auditing. The decision followed a request by the Place Alliance to use the Building for Life methodology as a basis for the audit. This decision was the first time that the authors exerted their intellectual property rights and prevented the use of Building for Life 12. The authors also exerted their rights in 2020 when a third party claimed that it had created Building for Life 12.

The authors closely monitor the use of the methodology and have supported its use in ways that advance the quality of new residential development and reflect a spirit of partnership working and cooperation with the house building industry.

For instance, Durham County Council, Maidstone Council and the national Design Network have been permitted to use the methodology free of charge. Building for Life 12 is cited in a number of Local and Neighbourhood Plans as well as Supplementary Planning Documents across the country. In exchange for free use, the authors request that they are notified and consulted of its use. This free use is almost always granted.

The Place Alliance audit presented conclusions on the design performance of English regions despite the limited sample base.

The East Midlands region was classified as one of the worst performing regions despite considerable improvements in design quality being made in the planning administrative areas of North East Derbyshire, Nottingham City, Chesterfield, Leicester City, South Derbyshire and North West Leicestershire. Since CABE's 2007 housing audits, these authorities invested in improving design quality with many of these areas covering lower market value areas. The Place Alliance sample base largely excluded schemes from these administrative areas.

Since 2007, these administrative areas have delivered schemes of a good standard of design including but not limited to: Ashton Green, Leicester; Sweet Leys Way, Melbourne; Towles Pastures, Castle Donington; Dunbar Way, Ashby de la Zouch; Frances Way, Ibstock; Hunter Street, Nottingham; Saltergate, Chesterfield, Godfrey Lane, Nottingham. A number of these schemes have increased design quality considerably against challenging planning, resourcing (in house design expertise) and viability pressures.

== Examples ==
Developments across all market areas in England and Wales, single tenure and mixed tenure schemes; volume produced and bespoke developments have achieved the qualities established in Building for Life 12 and Building for a Healthy Life.

Examples include Hasting Park in Dunbar Way, Ashby de la Zouch, a mixed tenure development by David Wilson Homes and Barratt Homes. Built using standard and modified standard house types, the development is a good example of how the street and movement structure is critical in establishing a strong framework for a place. This in then reinforced with meaningfully different street types, building typologies (the development features a mix of two and three storey detached, semi-detached, terraced houses, apartments and bungalows, building to street relationships, building to building relationships. Car parking is generally well integrated into the development though there are locations where half pavement car parking is commonplace. These locations are largely where tandem parking arrangements are used. The scheme is a good example of how well-designed and varied standard house types can be used to create a well-designed place.

== Previous editions ==
Birkbeck, D. and Kruczkowski, S., Collins. P (ed.) (2012) Building for Life 12: the sign of a good place to live, Nottingham Trent University. Birkbeck, D. and Kruczkowski, S., Collins. P (ed.) (2014) Building for Life 12: the sign of a good place to live, Nottingham Trent University. Birkbeck, D. and Kruczkowski, S. (2015) Building for Life 12: the sign of a good place to live, Nottingham Trent University. Birkbeck, D. and Kruczkowski, S. Collins. P (ed.) (2015) Adeliladu am Oes 12 Cymru: Arwydd o le da I fyw ynddo, Welsh Government.

== Current edition ==
Birkbeck, D., Kruczkowski, S., Jones, P., McGlynn, S. and Singleton, D. (2020) Building for a Healthy Life.
