= Disabled Peoples' International =

International disability rights organization

Disabled Peoples' International (DPI) is a cross disability, consumer controlled international non-governmental organization (INGO) headquartered in Ottawa, Ontario, Canada, and with regional offices in Asia-Pacific, the Middle East, Europe, Africa, Latin America, and North America and the Caribbean. DPI is a network of national organizations or assemblies of disabled people, established in 1980–81 to promote the human rights of disabled people through full participation, equalization of opportunity and development. DPI assists organisations in over 152 nations with the day to day issues of helping disabled people. They also host assemblies and symposiums across the world with their different national branches.

The goals of DPI are to:

- Promote the human rights of disabled people
- Promote economic and social integration of disabled people
- Develop and support organizations of disabled people

DPI holds special consultative status with the United Nations Economic and Social Council and collaborates with many international organizations and governments of the world. For example, it is accredited to participate in the Conferences of the States Parties to the Convention on the Rights of Persons with Disabilities (CRPD).

== 1972–1990 ==
=== Foundation ===
Since meeting at the 1972 World Congress meeting of the Rehabilitation International NGO in Sydney, Australia, disabled people from many countries had been involved in campaigning for their voice to be heard within the organisation. In 1980 this campaigning came to a head at the four-yearly World Congress meeting in Winnipeg, Canada. A key organisation in supporting disabled people at the 1980 meeting was the Coalition of Provincial Organisations of the Handicapped, COPOH, a national organisation of disabled people in Canada. It was COPOH's policy that any post-trauma rehabilitation of disabled people should be for a limited period only, followed by independent living. Fifty disabled delegates met in Winnipeg for three days to plan out their interventions before attending the Congress, which was attended by around 250 disabled delegates plus a larger number of non-disabled delegates. A vote for Rehabilitation International to require a minimum level of membership and control by disabled people, rather than by non-disabled professionals alone, was again defeated. On the evening of Monday 23 June 1980 a "tremendous roar filled the Convention Centre in Winnipeg" as the vote was taken to set up the World Coalition of Citizens with Disabilities, soon afterwards known at the Disabled Peoples' International. An Ad-Hoc Planning Committee was established and met several times in the remaining time in Winnipeg with representatives from six countries, reporting back to disabled delegates on Wednesday 25 June 1980. This led to the Steering Committee with two representatives each from the seven regions of the world. Henry Enns, Canada, was elected chairperson, and Bengt Lindqvist, Sweden, vice-chairperson.

=== United Nations ===
Henry Enns managed to obtain a place at the UN Advisory Committee meeting in Vienna, Austria, on 20–29 August 1980 for the UN International Year of Disabled Persons, and through these connections stated to gain United Nations (UN) recognition of DPI and some initial funding. Within a short period DPI was recognised as a legitimate NGO for consultation by the UN through its component organisations such as UNESCO, ECOSOC, the International Labour Organisation (ILO), and in May 1985 with the World Health Organization (WHO). In October 1987 twelve disabled people from DPI attended the UN General Assembly when a report was being considered on the first half of the UN Decade of Disabled Persons 1983–1992. The upstairs gallery for observers was inaccessible, so the DPI members were in the main room and used it to lobby the various governments' delegations directly. This moment was seen as a high point in DPI's influence at the UN.

=== First Congress ===
The first Congress of DPI took place in Singapore on 30 November – 4 December 1981 with 400 disabled delegates from all regions of the world. The British delegation, including Vic Finkelsein, had been mandated by the British Council of Organisations of Disabled People, BCODP, to challenge some aspects of the draft constitution, and this discussion formed the agenda for the start of the debates and votes in Congress. The first congress meeting was filmed, but the editing was problematic and reportedly members were generally unhappy with the final version, saying it had not captured the enthusiasm of the Singapore Congress. The following key Executive posts were elected:

- Ron Chandran-Dudley, Singapore, chairperson
- Henry Enns, Canada, deputy chairperson
- Bengt Lindqvist, Sweden, secretary
- Joshua Malinga, Zimbabwe, treasurer.

=== Early divisions ===
In her book of the history of DPI in the 1980s by one of the participants throughout, Diane Driedger, reports that the early years between 1981 and 1985 included quite a few conflicts within both the two staff teams (one office team in Canada and the other in Sweden) and within the elected members on the World Council. The 1985 World Congress in the Bahamas resolved these tensions with the elections of some new members, and staff relations reportedly improved with more oversight of staff team leaders as the Executive moved from taking a hands-off 'honorary' role to being more managerial. With some early funding from the international development funds of Canada and Sweden, DPI in 1982–85 focused on leadership development, but it was noted that the delegates for training seminars were mostly male, were many were already involved in DPI structures, and with very few Deaf people participating. This all reportedly improved after 1985, and disabled women self-organised within DPI, at one point threatening to split from DPI if their concerns weren't addressed, echoing the split from Rehabilitation International that had defined the creation of DPI.

=== Regional Development Program ===
In 1985 DPI hired three Regional Development Officers for the Latin America region, based in El Salvador, Jamaica, and Argentina. In 1987 the European office was opened in Sweden. By 1989 only the Jamaica officer remained because the Latin America funding had ended, however the same year two new posts were established in Africa, in Zimbabwe (for anglophone countries) and in Mauritius (for francophone countries). In the era of apartheid in South Africa, the issue of possible recognition of Disabled People South Africa (DPSA) as a member of DPI was repeatedly debated at the Congress meetings, but DPSA was never admitted into membership during apartheid.

== Court cases ==
In 1983 Disabled Peoples' International filed a complaint against the United States with the Inter-American Commission on Human Rights due to a brief military intervention in Grenada where a mental institution was bombed by the United States, injuring six and killing sixteen people.

== Projects ==
=== Human Rights Defenders ===
Human Rights Defenders was started by DPI in 2011 to help people with disabilities in developing countries. They want to improve the legal, social, and economical issues that affect people with disabilities. As of 2013, Human Rights Defenders established two Women's Global Networks that promote rights of women with disabilities. They also set up a youth organization to promote rights for youths with disabilities. The Project was closed in 2013.

=== Hatchery For Guyana ===
Hatchery for Guyana was started so that people with disabilities in Guyana would have honest employment. This project sold baby chicks to people with disabilities to rear so that they could earn an honest living and make a tangible contribution to society. Though DPI did not start this project, it did take place in funding it.
