= Margaret Blackwood (activist) =

Scottish activist

- Born: 1 October 1924; Dundee, Scotland
- Died: 28 January 1994 (aged 69); Edinburgh, Scotland
- Known for: Founder of Disablement Income Group Scotland.

Margaret Blackwood became Margaret McGrath MBE (1 October 1924 – 28 January 1994) was a Scottish activist and founder of Disablement Income Group Scotland.

== Biography ==
She was born Catherine Margaret Blackwood in Dundee and was the daughter of Beatrice Marie Orr and George Blackwood, an actuary. She was a pupil at St Margaret's School, Edinburgh.

She and her family moved to Edinburgh in 1965. Megan du Boisson and Berit Moore had inspired a campaign for a National Disability Income. In 1966 she started a Disablement Income Group (DIG) in Scotland to partner the group in England.

Margaret Blackwood was a campaigner for people with mental or physical disabilities and the founder of the Margaret Blackwood Housing Association (MBHA). The first home opened in Dundee in 1976. As of 2021, the association is known as Blackwood Homes and Care.

Margaret was awarded an honorary doctorate from Aberdeen University and in 1970 an MBE for her dedication to improving the lives of disabled people. She died in Edinburgh on 28 January 1994.

Blackwood campaigned for people with mental or physical disabilities to have the same rights, voice and opportunities as the able-bodied. She lobbied Scottish MPs, organised a March on Wheels protest along Princes Street, Edinburgh, and addressed a rally in Trafalgar Square, London. The campaign was successful; in 1970 the Chronically Sick and Disabled Persons Act, which introduced financial benefits for disabled people including mobility and attendance allowance, was passed.

== Private life ==
In 1978, she married fellow disability rights activist Charles McGrath.
