= Manchester Disabled Athletes =

The Manchester Disabled Athletes (MDA) was initially known as the Manchester and District Disabled Sports Club and existed for 43 years from June 1969 to August 2012. Probably its highest profile was in July 1981 when an MDA swimmer, Bernard Leach, boycotted his place in the England squad at the International Disability Games because an apartheid team was there from South Africa, a political and human rights boycott which made national news including criticism on the front page of the Daily Mail. A 50-year reunion of members was held in Manchester in June 2019.

== History ==
=== Origins ===
The club was formed on 23 June 1969. This formation was possibly timed so that members could enter as competitors in the Commonwealth Paraplegic Games to be held in Edinburgh in July the following year. The first minute book still exists and is in the MDA Collection of papers and objects in the GMCDP archive at ArchivesPlus in Manchester Central Library.

MDA's constitution required the membership and committee to be always at least 75% disabled people. One of the founders members was (Mrs) M Bone, then living in Ashton-under-Lyne. The club records found so far are mostly from 1969 to 1992, having mostly been retained by members, Neville Strowger (1939–2015), Kevin Hyett (1958–2004) and Lorraine Gradwell (1953–2017).

=== 1970s ===
MDA had a refresh of its committee and on 23 May 1973 the newly elected club committee met, but with no minutes from the previous meeting of the previous committee. The Chair is now Marjorie Cooper (international games gold medals winner), Fred Needham is Vice-Chair, and the Secretary is Neville Strowger. Anne Miller becomes the club's public relations officer, and Joan Clarke was the treasurer. The club photographer was Ken Barnsley, and his pictures were shown in an exhibition, possibly in Wigan.

The club had around £128, plus sports equipment stored at a school. The club also had junior members. Sports meetings were initially at Medlock Primary School, Ardwick. Some sports equipment including three table-tennis tables were stored and used there.

Meetings there were usually Monday evenings from 7.30pm. The club's teams often won their matches against teams of non-disabled players in the Manchester Table Tennis League. In later years sports events also were held at the Abraham Moss Centre and at the Stretford Leisure Centre.

Committee meetings were held at the Frank Taylor Centre in Ardwick, Manchester. Jean Lee was a continuing member from the earlier committee but resigned after the first meeting of the new committee. At the 26 June 1973 “the club's wedding present to David and Janet Foden, (a tray), was shown round and admired.” Also, “the Silver Wings Club at Manchester Airport is agreeable to our holding our Sports Day at their premises.” The following meeting received a report that the bar was also accessible.

The “L Gradwell” in the minutes up to 1978 is Les Gradwell, the future husband of Lorraine Mahoney. Lorraine Gradwell was active in a different disabled sports club – The Teesside Disabled Sports Club in Middlesbrough – but she met up with the Manchester club members at sports weekends which moved around the country, including the national and international games at Stoke Mandeville.

In 1974 Marjorie Cooper from Manchester and Lorraine Mahoney from Middlesbrough both attended the Paraplegic Commonwealth Games in Dunedin, New Zealand, each winning a gold medal. In that year 28 members attended the club's annual general meeting, with 60 members on the books. Membership subs were the same for juniors and for adults, 25p per weekly attendance.

One of the MDA members in the 1970s was a physical education (PE) teacher, Tony Sainsbury, who went to lead the British Paralympic team at five Paralympic Games, and the Independent Paralympic Athletes Team at the 2016 Summer Paralympics. He returned to the MDA reunion in 2019.

=== 1980s ===
There are a couple of examples from the MDA newsletter in April 1983 on the local and world politics that influenced the group, locally that:

- “In 1981 ... Councillor Winnie Smith, then Lord Mayor of Manchester made the conversion of Whitworth Street Baths, Openshaw, into the project for her Appeal Fund. This conversion into a Sports Hall, which is to be totally accessible for people with all sorts of [impairments] ... the opening day is to be 1st May 1983.”

and in the times of apartheid this item on the South African team attending the International Stoke Mandeville Games with a token number of black athletes attending and racist segregated sports facilities and organisations at home:

- “As someone who withdrew from the 1981 [international games] because of the South African participation [Bernard Leach's] views are well known. ... [At last the] Minister of Sport, Neil McFarlane, has confirmed that South African participation at [these games] is in violation of the Gleneagles Agreement ... [and] many countries are now refusing to participate ... last year the number of competitors was down from 800 to 500.”

Bernard Leach's withdrawal in protest in 1981 earnt him and colleagues hostile press coverage including on the front page of the Daily Mail on 25 July 1981.

=== 1990s ===
By the mid-1990s MDA had around 25 regular members, meeting every Thursday evening at Stretford Leisure Centre for swimming followed by table-tennis. The membership was getting older, no longer in competitions, and with no junior members.

=== Manchester 2002 ===
But the principles of integrating disabled people's sports into the mainstream were still being driven by MDA members. In 2002 Manchester hosted the Commonwealth Games in a newly built stadium. This was the first time worldwide that every medal in international games was counted equally, whether achieved by a disabled or a non-disabled athlete. And the stadium had a record number of places at the time for disabled spectators including wheelchair users. As a fringe event Lorraine Gradwell organised a reception evening at Aked Close in Ardwick for all the visiting disabled athletes to meet with other disabled people who were residents in Greater Manchester.

Martin Pagel, a disabled activist and a former Deputy Leader at Manchester City Council, credits MDA for the group's determination in pressing for this political and sporting watershed in hosting the world's first fully integrated international multi-sports event. In particular, Neville Strowger (1939–2015) had been a very active founder member within the club over all the years as well as winning national medals during the 1970s. He worked for Manchester City Council as an access officer and he was a driving force within the council and within the accessible design of the new stadium.

=== 2004 ===
The death of a key member, Kevin Hyett, in March 2004 caused a significant sadness within the group and membership and attendances dwindled from that point on.

=== London 2012 ===
Many sports insiders will also now admit that Manchester 2002 was the critical pitch for the Olympics in London 2012. It showed that the UK, once again, could run an international multi-sports event such as the Olympics without messing it up, and Manchester's organisers including Sir Howard Bernstein were part of the Olympic Bid Team and subsequent delivery boards. And while the equality of medals in Manchester in 2002 between disabled and non-disabled athletes was still too radical for the Olympic movement, the 2012 Paralympics in London inspired the country and showcased equality across the world.

=== 2012 and Closure ===
Although MDA had been dormant for some years, people held a continuing affection for it. Neville Strowger, Treasurer, wrote to the remaining members on 18 March 2012 proposing closure, noting that the remaining funds were £2,659. This was followed by a final meeting of the surviving members with a meal on 5 August 2012 where it was agreed that the dormant remaining funds should be given to a refugee charity helping people with no recourse to public funds in Manchester to help with their sports and leisure costs.

=== 2019 Reunion ===
A 50-year reunion of MDA's former membership was held at the Friends Meeting House in central Manchester on 22 June 2019 with around 25 people attending. As well as reminiscences there were additional stories and artifacts brought along to be added to the MDA Collection now held at Archives+ connected to the GMCDP Archive.

One of the members attending was Tony Sainsbury, at this point the chef de mission of the British Paralympic team at five Paralympic Games, and was the chef de mission of the Independent Paralympic Athletes Team at the 2016 Summer Paralympics. He recalled his time in MDA in the early 1970s and the liaison between MDA and Andrew Templeton, the Recreation Officer at the Baths and Laundries Department of Manchester City Council. Tony Sainsbury later worked at Manchester City Council from 1979, and this was with Andrew Templeton in what had become the Recreation Services Department. They were both former physical education (PE) teachers. He also worked as the Director of Sport at the University of Manchester.

Tony Sainsbury also recalled the links between MDA and a nearby disabled sports club, Oldham Owls. Dave Foden had been a member of MDA and had gone on to create the Oldham Owls group. Tony Sainsbury thought the interest might have started when Dave Foden reported to MDA that he might be able to get some space for MDA to train at Oldham's new sports centre.

== Archived collection ==
In addition to the original documents etc. stored variously in Manchester at the People's History Museum and at Archives+ there are the following files online:

- Manchester and District Disabled Sports Club (Manchester Disabled Athletes) – committee minutes – 1973 to 1976
- Stoke Mandeville and Apartheid, etc.
- Stoke Mandeville – National Paraplegic Games – June 1974
- Stoke Mandeville – International Paraplegic Games – July 1975 – The Observer
- Press coverage of the Commonwealth Paraplegic Games, Edinburgh, 1970
- Manchester Sports Club Moves House – Manchester Disabled Athletes – 1974
- Manchester Disabled Athletes – Sale Guardian – 11 July 1974
- Manchester Disabled Athletes – Public Relations Officer – letter 1974
- Manchester Disabled Athletes – Manchester Evening News – 12 July 1974
- Manchester Disabled Athletes – Constitution
- Manchester Disabled Athletes – AGM 1981 – Minutes and papers
- 1983-05 Sport, Disabled People and the Fight Against Apartheid, May 1983
- 1983-04 Manchester Disabled Athletes, Newsletter
- 1985-05-09 Manchester Disabled Athletes MDA minutes
- 1980s-circa (undated) Manchester Disabled Athletes MDA minutes
- 1992-02-03 Manchester Disabled Athletes MDA minutes
- 1992-05-circa Manchester Disabled Athletes MDA minutes
- 1969 to 1973 Manchester Disabled Athletes first minute book, digital copy online (the original book is now very fragile).
