= National Campaign for the Young Chronic Sick =

British advocacy group

The National Campaign for the Young Chronic Sick (NCYCS) was a group of disabled people and allies in the UK Labour Party in the 1960s who campaigned for independent living for disabled people at a time when the official provision was to live a lifetime in hospital, often in geriatric wards. Disabled people were called "the Young Chronic Sick" at the time by officials. NCYCS was influential in shaping a landmark social change and law in 1970 leading to the official responsibilities for disabled people moving out from hospitals and into social services departments.

== Origins in Chelsea Labour Party ==
NCYCS was established as a campaign within the Chelsea Labour Party in the spring of 1965 by a small group including Marsh Dickson, a non-disabled man married to Dorothy Dickson, a disabled woman. They had been told by the authorities that he had to give up his job to be a full-time carer for his wife or she would be taken into a hospital for the rest of her life. They also both feared that, should he become unwell or die, that she would spend the rest of her life on a hospital ward, and usually surrounded by unwell elderly people in "geriatric" wards. Later accounts confirm that the Chelsea Labour Party, of which Marsh Dickson was an active member, created and then provided practical support to NCYCS, as also acknowledged by Alf Morris MP (later Lord Morris of Manchester) and more recently by Lord (David) Owen. The constituency changed later to become Chelsea and Fulham.

== 1966 ==
In March 1966 Pamela La Fane is a disabled woman aged about 39 years, living in a hospital since the age of about 13 years and on wards with elderly people since the age of 16 years, when she reads a letter in the New Statesman magazine / journal by Marsh Dixon and she first becomes aware of NCYCS. She has trained herself as a young writer and produces a leaflet which impressed the NCYCS committee and is published as an article by The Guardian newspaper later in the year, creating a lot of interest and giving NCYCS a national public and political profile. She used the pen-name of Michele Gilbert to avoid reprisals from the hospital staff.

== 1968 ==
Pamela La Fane is featured in three television documentary programmes (made by the Man Alive BBC2 production team) that were broadcast on BBC1, 10:30pm on 6th, 13th and 20th June 1968 under the title, At a Time Like This - A Life of Her Own. She later wrote her autobiography, and she spoke about her book and about her 30 years in hospital in an interview on BBC Radio 4's Woman's Hour in September 1981.

== 1969 ==
Alf Morris MP was a backbench member of the UK parliament, and through a Private Members Bill he steered into law starting in 1969 and into early 1970, the Chronically Sick and Disabled Persons Act 1970, a wide-ranging law with many new powers and duties given to social services departments to meet the needs of disabled people. There is, however, a set-back within the range of new responsibilities given to hospitals which include the controversial expansion of the number of Young Disabled Units, YDUs.

== 1970s ==
These controversial YDUs become the focus of future campaigns by disabled people in the 1970s, and especially by the radical Union of the Physically Impaired Against Segregation, UPIAS. Maggie Davis, a UPIAS member, has written about the abuse she endured while living in a YDU in the early 1970s before achieving her independent living as an early pioneer. Recently accessed archive records in the People's History Museum, Manchester UK, suggest that the group, possibly renamed as the National Campaign for the Chronically Sick and Disabled (NCCSD) based on an entry in their accounts book, continued until around 1973.

== Further research ==
Some further details about NCYCS are currently known and have been published, but this is an emerging area of research and more details are needed. A 3rd edition of the book concerning this organisation is planned for publication in 2024.
