= The Little Red Schoolbook =

1969 book by Hansen and Jensen

- Cover of the first edition
- Author: Søren Hansen, Jesper Jensen
- Language: Danish
- Subject: education
- Publication date: 1969
- Publication place: Denmark

The Little Red Schoolbook (Danish: Den Lille Røde Bog For Skoleelever; English: The Little Red Book For School Pupils) is a book written by two Danish schoolteachers, Søren Hansen, Bo Dan Andersen and writer Jesper Jensen, first published in 1969. It was subject to much controversy upon its publication and was translated into many languages in the early 1970s.

== Synopsis ==
The book encourages young people to question societal norms and instructs them on how to do this. Out of 200 pages, it includes 20 pages on sex and 30 on drugs, including alcohol and tobacco. Other topics included adults as "paper tigers", the duties of teachers, discipline, examinations, intelligence, and different schools.

== Reception ==
As a result of its subject matter and its targeted audience of schoolchildren, politicians in many countries criticised the book, fearing it would erode the moral fabric of society and be an invitation for anarchy in schools. The LRSB was banned in France and Italy.

In Switzerland, the Bernese cantonal politician Hans Martin Sutermeister led a campaign against the book. He was initially successful in temporarily blocking the introduction of the book into the country. The subsequent controversy, however, ended his political career, costing him his job as director of the schools of the Swiss capital and contributed to a split in his party, the Ring of Independents, which led to its mid-term decline.

The book was banned in the Australian state of Queensland by the Queensland Literature Board of Review in 1972. Beatrice Faust contributed to the Australian edition of The Little Red Schoolbook. It was not banned in New Zealand despite some "moral outrage".

=== United Kingdom ===
The book was translated into English by Berit Moore, a Norwegian living in England in 1970.

The English edition was first distributed in Ireland by Filmbank Publications, Dublin during April 1972 and was available until the Censorship Publications Board banned it on 28 April 1972.

In the UK, Christian morality campaigner Mary Whitehouse pressed for the book to be prosecuted in a letter to the Director of Public Prosecutions, although action was already being taken. She was quoted in a Daily Telegraph article published on 29 March 1971 asserting the book "had caused 'incalculable harm' to children" in Denmark"; it "normalises the most licentious behaviour", she believed. Ross McWhirter, in a letter to The Guardian, thought "the real issue" about the book was its seditious nature.

The offices of the book's British publisher, Richard Handyside, were raided by the police and the eventual prosecution under the Obscene Publications Act was successful. Headmistress Elizabeth Manners, a witness for the prosecution at the trial, said: "It is not true to say that masturbation for girls is harmless, since a girl who has become accustomed to the shallow satisfactions of masturbation may find it very difficult to adjust to complete intercourse. This should be checked, but I believe it to be a fact". The court's decision was upheld on appeal on the basis that Handyside had not shown the public interest was served by issuing the book. It reached the European Court of Human Rights in the case known as Handyside v United Kingdom. The government however allowed a second, censored edition to be published, in which some of the passages criticised in court were amended or cut.

It was the subject of a BBC Radio 4 documentary in 2008 presented and produced by Jolyon Jenkins. It was also discussed critically by Peter Hitchens in his 2009 book The Broken Compass: How British Politics Lost its Way.

An unexpurgated edition of the book, bar one minor cut, was published in the UK in July 2014.

== See also ==
- Handyside v United Kingdom
