= Lorraine Gradwell =

British disability rights campaigner, writer and poet

Lorraine Susan Gradwell MBE (24 July 1953 – 3 September 2017) was a British disability rights campaigner and athlete, feminist writer and poet.

== Life and family ==
Gradwell was born Lorraine Susan Mahoney in a terraced street in Middlesbrough, the middle child with two brothers, Ian and Peter. Her mother, Inga (née Blythman), worked on a market stall. Her father, Tom, was a steelworker. She caught polio virus in the 1956 epidemic aged almost three and spent much of her early childhood in hospitals where she first used leg callipers, plus a little home education as an infant. As an adult she was a wheelchair user. From about 8 to 15 years of age she was living between hospitals and a 'special' boarding school. She gained her A levels at a local mainstream grammar school, and a degree in Fashion Design and Management taught as a sandwich course by Middlesbrough Art College and Hollins College in Manchester (later becoming part of Manchester Metropolitan University). She married Les Gradwell, with whom she settled in Manchester and had two children, John and Jenny. The marriage ended in 1983. She met Tony Baldwinson in 1985. They moved in together a year later and married in 2006. She was appointed MBE in 2008 for services to disabled people. She became semi-retired after a heart attack in 2012, and died from complications in 2017.

== Sport ==
In swimming, Gradwell represented England in the Commonwealth Paraplegic Games in New Zealand (1974) and gaining a gold medal in the Wheelchair Slalom track race; and in later life achieved an Open Water (at sea) scuba diving certificate while visiting Tenerife.

== Work ==
While being a single mother in the early 1980s she supplemented her income by hand-painting glazed designs on plain white plates and tea-sets for sale, which she fired in an electric kiln in her garage.

Lorraine Gradwell was a founder of the disabled people's organisation (DPO), Greater Manchester Coalition of Disabled People (GMCDP) and in 1986 was employed as its first development worker, later becoming the head of staff, team leader.

As an activist advisor Lorraine Gradwell helped to set up the Equalities Unit in Manchester City Council and she also worked with Greater Manchester Housing Disability Group and the academic June Maeltzer, to set up one of the early independent living schemes that used direct payments from a council's social services department in the 1970s and 1980s routed via the Irwell Valley housing association.

Between 1992 and 1995, Lorraine Gradwell worked for Manchester City Council as the Organiser for the Healthy Manchester 2000 project, later renamed Health For All. Initially this was within the environmental health department, but later reorganised into the social services department.

Between 1995 and 1997, her work for Manchester City Council changed, and she was asked to transform its employment services and she founded the Manchester-based disabled people's organisation Breakthrough UK Ltd, which supports disabled people to live and work independently. The formal launch event was 1 July 1998. As chief executive for almost 15 years, she led its growth to a £1m-plus annual income and 40 staff, 70% of them disabled.

She was a Disability Rights UK trustee and member of the co-production group at Coalition for Collaborative Care. She was a member of the Unison trade union, and served on the National Disabled Members self-organised group, speaking for it at the Unison national conference.

== Public activities ==
- Gradwell regarded as a high-point in her work her contributions to the 2005 Life Chances of Disabled People report and plan for change produced at the centre of UK government by the Prime Minister's Strategy Unit; and a low-point for many disabled people was how this plan was systemically dismantled by the subsequent Coalition government of 2010-2015 and the resulting years of austerity.
- Gradwell promoted the Social model of Disability and Independent Living.
- She was a Plenary Speaker and specialist Parliamentary Adviser to the House of Commons Speaker's Conference on the under-representation of MPs who are disabled, from BAME communities, LGBT+, and women.
- She campaigned with other activists for first accessible transport including black cabs, Disability Discrimination Act and direct payments to disabled people to support independent living in the 1980s.
- A draft list of Lorraine's collection of campaign t-shirts. 2017 Lorraine Gradwell – Campaign Clothing (draft v2) including involvement in the disabled people's Direct Action Network (DAN) and chaired the Buses for All - Europe international conference held in Manchester on 15 June 1995.
- Represented GMCDP on the national committee of the British Council of Organisations of Disabled People (BCODP).
- Gradwell also supported and followed campaigns in the US for disabled people's rights led by the American group ADAPT.
- Disability Employment Advisory Committee (DEAC), the Ministerial Advisory Committee at the Department for Work and Pensions (DWP): member for 5 years until 2010.
- Small Business Council (SBC); Ministerial Advisory Committee at the Department of Trade and Industry (DTI): member for 4 years and SBC 'Disability Champion'
- North West Equality and Diversity Group, 'sponsored' by the NW Regional Assembly: member for 2 years.
- The Manchester Board, later the Leaders' Forum, which 'shapes and drives the work done by its partners [organisations]': member from 2007 to 2012.
- A committee member of the Greater Manchester Coalition of Disabled People and campaigned nationally for the Civil Rights (Disabled Persons) Bill in 1994, which was replaced by the Disability Discrimination Act 1995, itself replaced by the Equality Act 2010.
- Represented the UK internationally at events organised by the Disabled People's International (DPI) organisation in 1980s.
- 1988 Disabled Peoples Arts Conference Report, Manchester, August 1988.
- A member of the Disabled Members self-organised group within the Unison trade union, including as a delegate to the annual national conference with speaking rights on stage.

== Legacy ==
A celebration of Gradwell's life was held on 2 October 2017 at Gorton Monastery. A tribute to Gradwell was published by the Disability News Service and she had an obituary published online and in print in The Guardian.

In December 2017 Gradwell was honoured alongside Bert Massie at a Disability History Month event at Liverpool Museum. For International Women's Day 2018, Gradwell's daughter gave a speech from the event stage in Castlefield, Manchester at the end of the Walk for Women. In September 2018, Gradwell was commended in a roll of honour' as a 'Great North Star' at an outdoor ceremony in Newcastle-Gateshead on the banks of the River Tyne, marking the end of the Great Exhibition of the North festival.

== Awards and accolades ==
- 2008 Birthday Honours - MBE.
- 2013 Spirit of Manchester award for Contribution to the Sector for Breakthrough UK.

== Published works ==
- Thriving and Surviving at Work. Bristol, UK: Policy Press. 2003. ISBN 9781861345226. with Alan Roulstone, Jeni Price, Lesley Child
- Sometimes Only Rain Will Do. Stockholm, Sweden: TBR Consulting. 2014. ISBN 978-0-9572606-5-8.
- A =Life Raft in a Stormy Sea. Stockholm, Sweden: TBR Consulting. 2015. ISBN 978-0-9572606-7-2. - a collation of 49 articles on disabled people's issues for Community Care and Coalition magazines
- More Together Than Ever : disabled women's experiences of involvement in a self-organised group. Manchester, UK: TBR Consulting. 2018.

Also:

- Is Disability a Political Issue?
- What Was That? - a poem for heart attack survivors.
- The musings of a knackered activist - Gradwell's blog site
