= Tony Sainsbury =

Chef de mission of the British Paralympic team

Tony Sainsbury OBE
- Born: Antony John Sainsbury
- Years active: 1988 –
- Known for: Chef de mission of the British and Independent Paralympics teams

Antony "Tony" John Sainsbury OBE has been the chef de mission of the British Paralympic team at five Paralympic Games, and was the chef de mission of the Independent Paralympic Athletes Team at the 2016 Summer Paralympics.

== Career ==
Sainsbury has been the chef de mission of the British Paralympic team at five Paralympic Games. In the 1995 Birthday Honours, Sainsbury was appointed an Officer of the Order of the British Empire (OBE) for "services to sport for disabled people", and he has also received the Paralympic Order. Sainsbury has been an honorary Vice-President of the British Paralympic Association, and has also worked as the Director of Sport at the University of Manchester (1993 to 1998).

He started his career in 1972 as a school teacher in sports in England, before going to review municipal sporting facilities.

In the 1970s he was a member of the Manchester Disabled Athletes sports club. At the 1988 Summer Paralympics in Seoul, Sainsbury was appointed the Vice-President of the International Wheelchair Basketball Federation. Sainsbury was also the Athletes' Village Manager for the London 2012 Olympic and Paralympic Games, during which time he said that "the Paralympics which were formed in London in 1948 were coming back home to the country it all started", and that he expected the atmosphere at the Athletes' Village to be "focused and low-key". He was also the general manager of the athletes' village for the 2014 Commonwealth Games in Glasgow, and in February 2016, he spoke at an event commemorating the twentieth anniversary of the formation of the National Paralympic Committee of Azerbaijan Republic.

In August 2016, Sainsbury was announced as the chef de mission for the Independent Paralympic Athletes Team at the 2016 Summer Paralympics; the team comprised S10 swimmer Ibrahim Al Hussein and T37 discus thrower Shahrad Nasajpour. Speaking at the announcement of the Independent Paralympic Athletes team, Sainsbury said that "These athletes will help to raise awareness of the plight of thousands of refugees and asylum seekers who make difficult decisions and journeys, often with impairments."

In September 2023, Sainsbury was appointed as the International Blind Sports Federation interim executive director, by the IBSA president Ilgar Rahimov (Azerbaijan) as part of an organisational restructure.

== Publications ==
Sainsbury wrote a 1998 publication to the British Olympic Academy about the history of disabled sport. The publication included mentions of the founding of the Comité International des Sports des Sourds (CISS) in 1924, which lead to the 1924 Summer Deaflympics. Sainsbury also reviewed the Olympic and Paralympic athlete villages from 1988 to 2000; Sainsbury said that the sales at the 1988 Paralympics had surprised locals, who had expected that the Paralympic supporters "had no buying power and would be more of a nuisance". He rated the facilities for the athletes at the 1992 Summer Paralympics in Barcelona as "exceptional" and the best prior to the 2000 Paralympics in Sydney. Sainsbury questioned the organisation of the 1996 Summer Paralympics in Atlanta. He reviewed the 2000 Paralympics venues as outstanding, due to the support of the local population and ticket sales.
