= Independent Living Fund Scotland =

Government agency in City of Edinburgh, Scotland

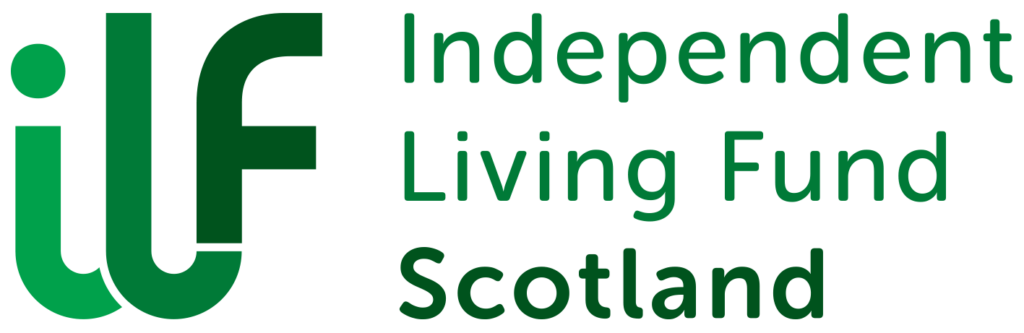
- ILF Scotland

Agency overview
- Formed: 2015
- Preceding agency: Independent Living Fund
- Type: Executive non-departmental public body
- Jurisdiction: Scotland
- Headquarters: Denholm House Almondvale Business Park, Almondvale Way, Livingston
- Agency executives: Anne-Marie Monaghan, Chair; Peter Scott, Chief Executive Officer
- Website: www.ifl.scot

Independent Living Fund Scotland (ILF Scotland) is an executive non-departmental public body of the Scottish Government.

It was set up in July 2015, taking over responsibility from the Independent Living Fund which had been abolished in June 2015, with the new fund no longer accepting new applications. It administers the payments for both Scotland and Northern Ireland.

In April 2024, the Scottish government reopened the ILF for new applications, restricted to people living in Scotland.
