= Megan du Boisson =

British campaigner for disability rights

- Born: 31 July 1922
- Died: 10 May 1969 (aged 46)
- Occupation: Disability rights activist
- Organization: Disablement Income Group (founder)
- Successor: Mary Greaves

Megan du Boisson (née James; 31 July 1922 – 10 May 1969) was a British campaigner for disability rights, and founder of the Disablement Income Group. On her unexpected death in 1969, The Times wrote that "it was her doing, more than that of any other single individual, that public opinion is now so much more alive to the needs of the disabled."

== Personal life ==
Megan Ramsay James was born on 31 July 1922. She married Harold William du Boisson in 1944, and they had three children. The couple lived in Lincoln from 1956 to 1959, and Megan du Boisson worked as secretary to Bishop Tomkins, principal of Lincoln Theological College. They later moved to Godalming, Surrey, where Megan founded the Disablement Income Group in 1965, having been diagnosed with multiple sclerosis.

== Disablement Income Group ==
Megan du Boisson and Berit Moore, both of whom had multiple sclerosis, founded the Disablement Income Group in 1965. This followed a letter co-written by the pair to The Guardian newspaper, in which they proposed the creation of a group, which "would exist only to correlate the work of the other groups in regard solely to getting recognition for the right of disabled persons, irrespective of the reason for that disablement, to pensions from the State to enable them to live in a reasonable degree of independence and dignity in their own homes".

The DIG was established "a pressure group bent on changing legislation and obtaining for the severely disabled a State income in their own right." According to Margaret Blackwood, writing in the Journal of Medical Ethics in 1981, du Boisson "uncovered undeniable poverty, ignorance and despair" and "was emphatic in her arguments that society must embrace its disabled members. She was equally emphatic in her insistence that the disabled must come out of their refuges and speak of their difficulties." Du Boisson sought an "all-embracing 'National Disability Pension for all disabled - regardless of how they came by their disability'." Blackwood, inspired by du Boisson, founded DIG Scotland.

In an interview with du Boisson in 1967, Times journalist Charles Robinson wrote that "The Disablement Income Group is an organization whose sole reason for existence is to help disabled people live as human beings in a very unhelpful and uninterested society. lt began because it was needed, and has flourished because the need for it is desperate." During its first four years of existence, du Boisson developed the organization into one with over 10,000 members and active supporters. Speaking and writing extensively, du Boisson became well known as a public champion of disabled people.

Du Boisson was a prominent voice for disability rights, and remembered as one who combined passion and personal experience of disability, with exacting knowledge of her arguments. The Times would write:

By a combination of exquisite personal charm and firm intellectual grasp she won the respect not only of those with an immediate instinctive sympathy for her cause but of hard-pressed politicians and administrators as well. She could so easily have pitched her appeal on a purely emotional level, and indeed she always spoke and wrote with deep feeling. But it was because she had a command of her facts, a knowledge of comparable policies abroad, and could appreciate the problems of her own proposals that she was a highly effective lobbyist in Whitehall.

Jameel Hampton has written that the work of the DIG, and in particular that of du Boisson, compelled Parliament and the Trades Unions Congress "to engage with the welfare of disabled people," worked through the media to bring the realities of disability into the public eye, and "made it widely accepted that some sort of cash provision was needed alongside services".

== Death ==
Du Boisson was killed in a car crash on Saturday 10 May 1969, aged 46, on the way to DIG's 4th annual meeting. A commemorative service was held in St Martin-in-the-Fields church, London.

Her obituary in The Times stated that although du Boisson had died "without the Government having accepted any of her main objectives", she had won the battle in terms of public opinion, "now so much more alive to the needs of the disabled". It concluded that "perhaps her greatest success lay not in the advocacy of policies but in the example of her own activity: at once humbling to the fit and inspiring to the sick."

Along with others who worked for disability rights and through the Disablement Income Group, du Boisson is commemorated with a bench in Godalming, Surrey.
