= Mary Greaves =

British civil servant and disability rights campaigner

Mary Greaves MBE
- Mary Greaves, from a 1969 newspaper
- Born: 23 April 1907; Newcastle Upon Tyne, England
- Died: 16 January 1983 (aged 75); London, England
- Education: Ruskin College; London School of Economics
- Occupations: Civil servant; disability rights campaigner
- Organization: Disablement Income Group
- Known for: Contributions to the passage of the Chronically Sick and Disabled Persons Act 1970
- Notable work: Work and Disability: Some Aspects of the Employment of Disabled Persons in Great Britain (1969)

Mary Greaves MBE (23 April 1907 – 16 January 1983) was a British civil servant and disability rights campaigner, who was instrumental in helping to pass the Chronically Sick and Disabled Persons Act 1970. Following the death of its founder Megan du Boisson in 1969, Greaves became head of the Disablement Income Group.

== Early life and career ==
Mary Elsworth Greaves was born on 23 April 1907 at 83 Falmouth Road, Newcastle upon Tyne, the daughter of Joseph Elsworth Greaves and Mary Beatrice Heckels. The family lived in Whitley Bay. Both of her parents were teachers.

As a child, Greaves contracted polio, which left her severely disabled. Initially fearful she would never find work, she gained increased freedom with a hand propelled tricycle and attended college. Trained in shorthand, Greaves subsequently gained employment as a secretary at Whitley Bay Council. She later established her own successful shorthand and typing school from her parents' house.

Aged 35, in 1942, Greaves undertook a correspondence course in sociology with Ruskin College, and later completed a BSc in economics. In 1945, now employed by the Ministry of Works, she studied part-time at the London School of Economics, obtaining a degree in sociology and statistics. Greaves was a civil servant until her retirement, and was awarded the MBE.

== Campaigning ==
Upon her retirement from the civil service, Greaves "travelled about the country investigating employment opportunities for disabled people" (The Times). This formed the basis of her 1969 book Work and Disability: Some Aspects of the Employment of Disabled Persons in Great Britain, described as an "invaluable reference book". Reviewing it for The British Medical Journal, C.B. Wynn Parry wrote:

This short book is written by a remarkable woman who although severely disabled by poliomyelitis educated herself in economics, sociology, and industrial psychology, and subsequently worked in the National Economic Development Office. Her comments on the state of the services for the disabled are therefore made from the inside as well as from a lifetime's study of the problem as it affects others... The book contains a valuable bibliography and a summary of what is available for the disabled in other countries. It is full of wisdom and common sense, and should be read by everyone concerned with the disabled.

Following the death of Megan du Boisson, co-founder of the Disablement Income Group with Berit Moore, Greaves took on the role of director of the DIG. She became known as a leading activist "in campaigns around employment, disability incomes, and mobility issues", and played an active role in helping Alf Morris's private members' bill pass through Parliament to become The Chronically Sick and Disabled Persons Act in 1970. Campaigner Peter Large later recalled that Greaves chaired the committee which helped with drafting the Act, providing briefs, and dealing with amendments. The group under Greaves also campaigned for a national disability income. "I don't want to sit at home having everyone be nice to me," she said in a 1973 interview. "I'd rather go out and do things and have people being nasty to me if they feel so inclined, and then I'll fight back."

== Death and legacy ==
Mary Greaves used crutches and a wheelchair in her later years. She died on 16 January 1983 in a London hospital, aged 75. Her obituary, published in The Times, remembered her as "a woman of courage and good sense, who disliked above all things a sentimental approach to disability."
