= Handyside v United Kingdom =

1976 European Court of Human Rights case

Handyside v United Kingdom (5493/72) was a landmark case decided by the European Court of Human Rights in 1976. Its conclusion contains the famous phrase that:

Freedom of expression ... is applicable not only to 'information' or 'ideas' that are favourably received or regarded as inoffensive or as a matter of indifference, but also to those that offend, shock or disturb the State or any sector of the population.

— Paragraph 49 of the judgment

Nevertheless, the court did not find for the applicant, who had been fined for publishing a book deemed to be obscene.

== Facts ==
Richard Handyside, proprietor of "Stage 1" publishers, purchased British rights of The Little Red Schoolbook, written by Søren Hansen and Jesper Jensen and published, as of 1976, in Denmark, Belgium, Finland, France, West Germany, Greece, Iceland, Italy, the Netherlands, Norway, Sweden, and Switzerland, as well as several non-European countries.

Its chapter on pupils contained a 26-page section concerning "Sex". Handyside sent out several hundred review copies of the book, together with a press release, to a selection of publications from national and local newspapers to educational and medical journals. He also placed advertisements for the book. The book became subject of extensive press comment, both favourable and not.

On 31 March 1971, 1,069 copies of the book were provisionally seized together with leaflets, posters, showcards, and correspondence relating to its publication and sale. On 1 April 1971, 139 more copies were seized. About 18,800 copies of a total print of 20,000 copies were missed and subsequently sold.

On 8 April, a magistrates' court issued two summonses against Handyside for having in his possession obscene books for publication for gain. Handyside ceased distribution of the book and advised bookshops accordingly but, by that time, some 17,000 copies were already in circulation.

On 1 July 1971, Handyside was found guilty of both offences and fined £25 on each summons and ordered to pay £110 costs. His appeal was rejected.

== Proceedings before the European Court of Human Rights ==
The application was lodged by Handyside in 1972.

In 1975, the European Commission of Human Rights had adopted its report on the case, finding no violations of Convention rights, and specifically articles 10, 17, and article 1 of Protocol 1 by a majority (no violation of article 18 was found unanimously).

In 1976, court's chamber relinquished jurisdiction in favour of the plenary court.

== Judgment ==
Using the margin of appreciation doctrine, the court held by thirteen votes to one that the interference in Handyside's freedom of expression was both prescribed by law, having a legitimate aim and necessary in a democratic society, thus there was no violation of article 10 ECHR. Importantly, the case bore considerable development for the doctrine of the margin of appreciation. The Court reasoned:

By reason of their direct and continuous contact with the vital forces of their countries, State authorities are in principle in a better position than the international judge to give an opinion on the exact content of these requirements.

Judge H. Mosler disagreed and filed a dissenting opinion, considering that violation did take place due to interference not being necessary.

The court had also held unanimously that Handyside's property rights (article 1 of protocol 1) were not violated. Judge M. Zekia filed a concurring opinion in this question.
