= Maggie Davis =

British disability rights activist

Maggie Davis and her husband Ken opened a housing scheme on Grove Road, Sutton-in-Ashfield, in 1976, following the principles of Independent Living. They helped to set up the Union of the Physically Impaired Against Segregation (UPIAS).

== History of Grove Road ==
In September 1972, Maggie and Ken established a cooperative to buy land, commission architects and design their own housing scheme, consisting of six flats three of which are wheelchair accessible. This was to be known as the Grove Road Housing Scheme.

After four years, on 13 September 1976 they moved into Grove Road, which was designed specifically to enable them to have independence. In order to find accessible fixtures and fitting for their new home, Maggie and Ken had to source a kitchen sink from Sweden, which had enough room for a wheelchair under the sink, lowered work surfaces and ceiling hoists to enable access from the bed to chair to bathroom.

Through working with the architects, they were able to ensure that the building and adaptations met their needs and enabled them to no longer be reliant on non-disabled people helping them. The idea behind the housing was to enable three homes for disabled and three homes for non-disabled residents in the building, with the non-disabled residents providing support and assistance to their disabled neighbours if required.

Information and research on the Grove Road Housing Scheme and Maggie and Ken Davis is now held at the Royal Institute of British Architects Archive, and the History of Place website. Their story was showcased in 2018 at the Victoria & Albert Museum, London in the "Without Walls: Disability and Innovation in Building Design" Exhibition.

== Death ==
Davis died in March 2024.
