= Design and access statement =

Report required under English and Welsh planning law

A design statement is a report required under English and Welsh planning law that sets out, illustrates and justifies the process that has led to the development proposals. It is required to be submitted to accompany a planning application.

The DCLG circular 01/2006 and the Planning and Compulsory Purchase Act 2004, compulsorily require applicants to provide a Design & Access Statement as part of any planning application from 10 August 2006. This includes outline planning applications.

Isochrone maps may be included.
