= Commission for Architecture and the Built Environment =

UK government public body

- Abbreviation: CABE
- Merged into: Design Council
- Formation: 1 August 1999
- Dissolved: 1 April 2011
- Type: Government architectural advisory organisation
- Legal status: Quango
- Purpose: Public architecture in England
- Headquarters: London, EC1
- Region served: England
- Chief Executive: Richard Simmons
- Main organ: Board of Commissioners (Chairman – Paul Finch OBE)
- Website: www.designcouncil.org.uk/our-work/cabe/

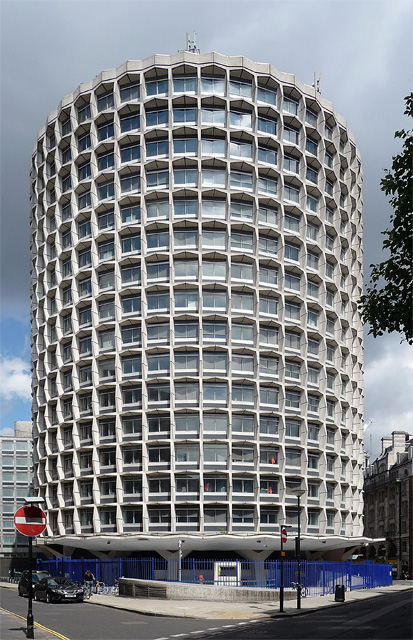
One Kemble Street

The Commission for Architecture and the Built Environment (CABE) was an executive non-departmental public body of the UK government, established in 1999. It was funded by both the Department for Culture, Media and Sport and the Department for Communities and Local Government. It was merged into the Design Council on 1 April 2011.

== Function ==
CABE was the government's advisor on architecture, urban design and public space in England. Its job was to influence and inspire the people making decisions about the built environment. It championed well-designed buildings, spaces and places, ran public campaigns and provided expert, practical advice. It worked directly with architects, planners, designers and clients.

== Structure ==
CABE's board members – its commissioners – were appointed by the Secretary of State for Culture, Media and Sport. There were 16 commissioners in total. Its chair was Paul Finch, a former chair of the Design Council. CABE's chief executive was Richard Simmons.

One of CABE's main functions was design review: expert independent assessments of building schemes at an early stage. CABE reviewed schemes of national importance, that had a significant impact on the local environment, or which set standards for the future. Its design review panel consisted of around 40 expert advisors drawn from England's architectural, built environment and creative community. CABE was known as a 'non-statutory consultee' in the planning process, meaning that planners and others should heed CABE's advice when making decisions, but were not obliged to do so.

CABE's main office was situated in a large tower block built in 1968 (and designed by Richard Seifert) near Drury Lane.

== History ==
CABE was the direct successor body to the Royal Fine Art Commission, originally established in 1924. Originally intended to be called "Commission for Architecture", Sir Terry Farrell successfully argued for "Built Environment" to be added to the new commission's name and purview. CABE was established in August 1999. It came about from the Urban Task Force set up in 1998, chaired by Richard Rogers. Some CABE's functions, including design review and localism and planning, were merged with the Design Council on 11 April 2011 (the Design Council is a registered charity).

CABE's first chairman was Stuart Lipton who was also Chief Executive of the property developer Stanhope. Private Eye's architectural correspondent complained that this represented a conflict of interest.

=== Former commissioners ===
- Paul Morrell
- Ben Page
- Ian Ritchie
- Sunand Prasad

== Activities ==
CABE set up a dedicated design review panel to provide expert advice on the quality of designs for the government's proposed eco-towns. The panel reviewed the proposals for: Whitehill-Bordon in Hampshire; Rackheath in Norfolk; North-West Bicester in Oxfordshire; and St Austell in Cornwall.

CABE launched a campaign to push for greater investment in green infrastructure. The 'Grey to Green' campaign and report, Grey to Green: how we shift funding and skills to green our cities, argued that a switch was needed in public spending from grey projects, like road building and heavy engineering projects, to green schemes, like street trees, parks, green roofs and waterways.

It developed the Building for Life scheme and Manual for Streets.

== Other regions ==
CABE's remit did not cover Scotland, Wales or Northern Ireland. The equivalent body in Scotland is Architecture and Design Scotland, the successor body to the Royal Fine Art Commission for Scotland. The equivalent body in Wales is the Design Commission For Wales. In Northern Ireland, equivalent work is undertaken by the Ministerial Advisory Group for Architecture and the Built Environment (MAG) which was established in 2007 under the Northern Ireland Policy for Architecture and the Built Environment. The successor to CABE, Design Council CABE, operates nationally and internationally.

== Abolition and legacy ==
In 2010 the Government announced that it would withdraw public funding from CABE, merging some functions into a new organisation with the Design Council, Design Council CABE (a registered charity). As in the transition from the Royal Fine Art Commission to CABE, the combined organisation had a much reduced staff and while it continued its Design Review and Localism and Planning roles, a review was conducted into the organisation and its role in delivering emerging proposals for the planning system.

Joanna Averley, who had previously been the Deputy Chief Executive of CABE, became the UK Government's Chief Planner in the Ministry of Housing, Communities and Local Government in September 2020 - becoming the first woman to hold the role.

== See also ==
- Construction Industry Council
- Landscape Institute
