= Right to Control (Disabled People, England, 2010–2013) =

United Kingdom project

Around 2010, there were a number of funding sources in England and Wales which could be paid to disabled people for their various needs at home and in work, but sometimes these funds worked against each other. The idea of a 'Right to Control' was to attempt to give some co-ordination to these funds, and to put the disabled person at the centre of their planning.

== Seven pilot areas ==
As part of the Welfare Reform Act 2009, the Disabled People's Right to Control (Pilot Scheme) (England) Regulations 2010 attempted to put in place a right for disabled people to request choice and control over a range of public resources needed to support independent living in the community. The Government established a pilot programme of seven projects in England which it called Trailblazers.

The scope of the projects included the Access to Work funds held by JobCentre Plus, an agency of central government, as well as direct payments for the costs of independent living including employing personal assistants, paid to disabled people by the social services departments of councils. The first phase of the pilot projects ran from December 2010 to December 2012.

== Greater Manchester ==
One of these pilots was called the Manchester Area Partnership, which consisted of five of the ten local authorities (councils) in Greater Manchester:

- Bury,
- Manchester,
- Oldham,
- Stockport, and
- Trafford.

A 12-month extension to the pilots into 2013 was agreed after consultation, however Oldham council decided it would withdraw its involvement and left on 12 December 2012.
