= United Kingdom's Disabled People's Council =

British disability rights organization

- Established: 31 June 1981; 45 years ago
- Dissolved: 6 August 2016; 10 years ago
- Headquarters: 27 Old Gloucester Street, London, WC1N 3AX
- Formerly called: British Council of Organisations of Disabled People (BCODP); British Council of Disabled People (BCODP)

The United Kingdom's Disabled People's Council (UKDPC), formerly the British Council of Organisations of Disabled People (BCODP), was a British council for organisations and campaigns led by disabled people for legal, social and cultural change in Britain. The UKDPC was dissolved in 2016.

== Origins ==
BCODP was founded in 1981, the United Nations International Year of Disabled Persons (IYDP). Vic Finkelstein was especially keen to build 'a mass movement' of disabled people in Britain.

- "On 13 June 1981 in London a meeting was organised between UPIAS [the Union of the Physically Impaired Against Segregation (UPIAS)] and eight other national organisations controlled by disabled people, plus a further five organisations being willing to be involved. Its initial name was the National Council of Organisations of Disabled People, soon becoming [BCODP]" (page 15).

It was one of a new type of organisation at the time, being radically different to the established big disability charities in two ways: these charities claimed to speak for disabled people, and they were often impairment-specific (such as for blind people, for people with health condition X, for deaf people, etc.). BCODP followed the new Social Model of Disability which said that what people with impairments had in common was that they were disabled by society, not by their impaired bodies.

There had been some previous pan-impairment groups of disabled people in the 1960s, but these tended to focus on one aspect, such as the Disablement Income Group and the National Campaign for the Young Chronic Sick.

== Research committee ==
BCODP linked with the Centre for Disability Studies at the University of Leeds to provide the organisation with high-quality research capacity, and in particular to support the case for new anti-discrimination legislation (ADL) for civil rights for disabled people. BCODP was prominent in the campaigns and protests which led to the (flawed) Disability Discrimination Act 1995.

== Independent Living committee ==
An early focus of the work of BCODP was around Independent Living with the first meeting of this committee in 1982. It started to source funding from the UK government's Department of Health for staff and events costs, and established the National Centre for Independent Living (NCIL) which became an independent spin-out organisation from 2003 to 2006.

== Name changes ==
In later years BCODP went through two changes in its name and structure, first in 1997 becoming the British Council of Disabled People (still known as BCODP), and in 2006 becoming the United Kingdom's Disabled People's Council (UKDPC).

== Final years ==
In 2014, the UKDPC's last member of paid staff was made reducent, and was then run solely by volunteers and trustees.

On 6 August 2016, the UKDPC was dissolved as a company. On 5 July 2017, the UKDPC was removed from the Charity Commission Central Register of Charities.
