= Berit Moore =

Norwegian-born activist for sex education and disability rights

Berit Stueland
- Born: Berit Stueland c.1937 Bergen, Norway
- Died: 2012 (aged 74–75)
- Known for: activist for sex education and disability rights
- Spouses: Brian Moore; Cedric Thornberry

Berit Stueland, also known as Berit Moore and Berit Thornberry (1937 – 2012), was a Norwegian-born activist for sex education and disability rights. She translated a copy of The Little Red Schoolbook into English, which was declared obscene, and with Megan du Boisson, she founded the Disablement Income Group.

== Life ==
Stueland was born in the Norwegian port city of Bergen in about 1937. Her childhood was during the Second World War, and her father was a member of the Norwegian resistance. He was also a church minister, and her mother was a teacher. In 1958, she decided to become an au pair in England, and at a youth group, she met her future husband, Brian Moore. They had two children, and shortly after the second was born in 1961, she was given a diagnosis of multiple sclerosis. Megan du Boisson had also been given a similar diagnosis.

Megan du Boisson and Moore wrote a letter to The Guardian on 22 March 1965. At the time, social security payments to disabled people depended on the cause of that impairment. People injured in war or in the workplace were entitled to significantly more support than the "civilian" disabled. Married women were very poorly served. The Disablement Income Group (DIG) was founded in 1965 by what was called two "housewives". The group's co-founder Megan du Boisson died in a car accident while driving to attend the 4th AGM of DIG. Du Boisson's role was taken by Mary Greaves.

Her obituary reported that she had given the phrase "Does he take sugar?" to a BBC producer and this had then been used for the title long running radio programme about disability issues.

She came to notice again when she translated a copy of The Little Red Schoolbook into English in 1970. It was published in 1971. The book was said to be seditious and was judged obscene as it dealt with sex and authority in an open way.

During the seventies, she married again and she was working with the charity Child Poverty Action Group.
