= Chronically Sick and Disabled Persons Act 1970 =

Act of the Parliament of the United Kingdom

Chronically Sick and Disabled Persons Act 1970 (Note: Section 29(1).)
- Act of Parliament
- Parliament of the United Kingdom
- Long title: An Act to make further provision with respect to the welfare of chronically sick and disabled persons; and for connected purposes.
- Citation: 1970 c. 44
- Introduced by: Alf Morris MP (Commons)
- Territorial extent: England and Wales; Scotland; (Note: Section 29(2)–(3))

Dates
- Royal assent: 29 May 1970
- Commencement: 29 August 1970 (in part); 29 November 1970 (sections 4–8); 1 October 1971 (section 1, England) (Note: Section 29(4). The Chronically Sick and Disabled Persons Act 1970 (Commencement No. 1) Order 1971 (SI 1971/698).); 1 December 1971 (section 21) (Note: Section 29(4). The Chronically Sick and Disabled Persons Act 1970 (Commencement No. 2) Order 1971 (SI 1971/1491).); 1 October 1972 (section 1) (Note: Section 29(4). The Chronically Sick and Disabled Persons Act 1970 (Commencement) (Scotland) Order 1972 (SI 1972/1420).); (Note: Section 29(4).)
Other legislation
Amended by	Housing Rents and Subsidies Act 1975; Education (Scotland) Act 1980; Energy Act 1983; Housing (Scotland) Act 1987; Trade Union Reform and Employment Rights Act 1993; Postal Services Act 2000; Countryside and Rights of Way Act 2000; Armed Forces (Pensions and Compensation) Act 2004; Policing and Crime Act 2017; Veterans Advisory and Pensions Committees Act 2023

Status: Amended

Text of statute as originally enacted

Revised text of statute as amended

Text of the Chronically Sick and Disabled Persons Act 1970 as in force today (including any amendments) within the United Kingdom, from legislation.gov.uk.

The Chronically Sick and Disabled Persons Act 1970 (c. 44) is an act of the Parliament of the United Kingdom which makes provision with respect to the welfare of chronically sick and disabled persons. The act, often shortened to ′CSDPA', was given royal assent on 29 May 1970.

The legislation was introduced as a Private Member's Bill by Alf Morris after he gained first place in a ballot held on 6 November 1969. From some 550 contenders, Alf Morris was afforded the opportunity to introduce his Chronically Sick and Disabled Persons Bill.

The provisions of the act are wide-ranging and place a legal obligation on local authorities to make arrangements in relation to access for disabled people to public buildings, such as libraries. Section 2 of the act makes specific provision for welfare services such as the provision of meals in the home or somewhere else; the provision (or assistance to obtain) a radio and television, a library and other recreational services; for assistance with obtaining travel to and from home; for assistance with adaptations to the home; for the installation of telephones or special equipment necessary to enable the use of a telephone; for the provision of vehicles.

== Effect of case law ==
There have been a number of legal cases which have brought about a body of caselaw which should be taken into account when considering the meaning and scope of this act.

R v Gloucestershire CC Ex p. Barry (1997) allowed an appeal by Gloucestershire County Council of the Court of Appeal's decision that the local authority could not take into account the available financial resources in establishing need and that this could not be assessed in the absence of some consideration as to the potential financial expenditure involved in addressing the need. However, a more recent ruling from the House of Lords in R v East Sussex County Council, ex p. Tandy [1998] has narrowed the reach of the ruling in Barry confining it to the CSDPA 1970 and not the duties under Section 21 of the National Assistance Act 1948.

== See also ==
- Alf Morris, British Labour Co-operative politician and disability campaigner who introduced the Bill.
- Mary Greaves, then head of the Disablement Income Group, who helped secure the passage of the Bill
