= Lifetime Homes Standards =

The Lifetime Homes Standard is a series of sixteen design criteria intended to make homes more easily adaptable for lifetime use at minimal cost. The concept was initially developed in 1991 by the Joseph Rowntree Foundation and Habinteg Housing Association.

The administration and technical support on Lifetime Homes is provided by Habinteg, who took on this responsibility from the Joseph Rowntree Foundation in 2008.

On 25 February 2008 the UK Government announced its intention to work towards all new homes being built to Lifetime Homes Standards by 2013.

== Criteria ==
The sixteen criteria are:

1. Parking (width or widening capability)
2. Approach to dwelling from parking (distance, gradients and widths)
3. Approach to all entrances
4. Entrances
5. Communal stairs and lifts
6. Internal doorways and hallways
7. Circulation space
8. Entrance level living space
9. Potential for entrance level bed space
10. Entrance level WC and shower drainage
11. WC and bathroom walls
12. Stairs and potential through-floor lift in dwellings
13. Potential for fitting of hoists and bedroom / bathroom relationship
14. Bathrooms
15. Glazing and window handle
16. Location of service controls

== Other standards ==
Part M of the Building Regulations includes requirements aimed in a similar direction to the Lifetime Homes Standards, but generally not going quite as far.

The Code for Sustainable Homes (Level 6) includes the Lifetime Homes Standard.

A revised version of the Lifetime Homes Standard was published on 5 July 2010 in response to a consultation, introduced to achieve a higher level of practicability for volume developers in meeting the requirements of the Code for Sustainable Homes. The revisions will also facilitate the adoption of Lifetime Homes design as a requirement for all future publicly funded housing developments.

The revisions are the result of work by the Lifetime Homes Technical Advisory Group representing a cross-section of practitioners involved in housing design, housing development, access consultancy and provision of adaptations.
