= Disablement Income Group =

The Disablement Income Group (DIG) was a British disability pressure group formed in 1965 in Godalming, Surrey. It is considered to be one of the first pan-impairment pressure groups in Britain, and was created to campaign for the introduction of a full disability income through the social security system for all disabled people.

According to the Charity Commission, The Disablement Income Group had ceased to exist as a charity by 2 April 2003.

== History ==
DIG was founded in 1965 by two "housewives" as known at the time, when Megan du Boisson and Berit Moore wrote a letter to The Guardian newspaper on 22 March 1965. Margaret Blackwood formed a similar group in Scotland in 1966. At the time, social security payments to disabled people depended on the previous cause of impairment. People injured in war or in the workplace were entitled to significantly more support than the "civilian" disabled. DIG's campaigns brought the poverty of disabled people, and especially disabled women, to the attention of the general public. This campaign and other events such as the thalidomide scandal led to the creation of a series of new social security benefits in the 1970s. These included benefits for women who had not been in paid work and other carers who had previously been excluded from benefit.

In 1988 DIG was appointed by government to help administer the Independent Living Fund.

DIG is significant as it was formed by disabled people, and key leaders such as Du Boisson, Mary Greaves and Peter Large were themselves disabled. For this reason, many consider DIG to represent one of the key organisations in the beginnings of the modern disability movement in the United Kingdom.
