= Union of the Physically Impaired Against Segregation =

Disability rights organisation

The Union of the Physically Impaired Against Segregation (UPIAS) was an early disability rights organisation in the United Kingdom. It established the principles that led to the development of the social model of disability, wherein a sharp distinction is made between impairment and disability. From the organisation's policy statement: "What we are interested in, are ways of changing our conditions of life, and thus overcoming the disabilities which are imposed on top our physical impairments by the way this society is organised to exclude us." (UPIAS founding statement)

== History and platform ==
UPIAS was begun in 1972 by Paul Hunt when he invited disabled people to form a group to confront disability issues, in a letter to The Guardian newspaper, 20 September 1972. It was later officially founded by him and Vic Finkelstein. Hunt developed his ideas when he was living in an institution (Le Court, Hampshire, a Leonard Cheshire Home) where he and others had been struggling in the 1960s with the authorities over the right of disabled people to control their own lives.

The organisation's overtly political platform contrasted with the then predominant charity orientation of organisations involved in disability issues. Their founding statement explicitly rejected the charity concept: "All registered charities receive valuable tax concessions, but they are not allowed to campaign directly for political change. We regard political involvement as essential if disabled people are ever to make real advances. So in order to protect our independence of action we are not registered with the Charity Commissioners."

They created new definitions of impairment and disability. They defined impairment as "lacking part of or all of a limb, or having a defective limb, organism or mechanism of the body" and disability as "the disadvantage or restriction of activity caused by contemporary organisation which takes no or little account of people who have physical impairments and thus excludes them from the mainstream of social activities".

They also rejected the notion that experts could prescribe how disabled people should live their lives:

We reject also the whole idea of "experts" and professionals holding forth on how we should accept our disabilities, or giving learned lectures about the "psychology" of disablement. We already know what it feels like to be poor, isolated, segregated, done good to, stared at, and talked down to — far better than any able-bodied expert. We as a Union are not interested in descriptions of how awful it is to be disabled. What we are interested in, are ways of changing our conditions of life, and thus overcoming the disabilities which are imposed on top our physical impairments by the way this society is organised to exclude us. In our view, it is only the actual impairment which we must accept; the additional and totally unnecessary problems caused by the way we are treated are essentially to be overcome and not accepted. We look forward to the day when the army of "experts" on our social and psychological problems can find more productive work.

This rejection of the authority of experts was a consequence of the experience of some of the founders, including Hunt, who were residents of the Le Court Cheshire Home, with a study by independent consultants called in to resolve a dispute between residents and the management over the right of residents to self-determination of how they live their own lives.

The British Council of Organisations of Disabled People was founded in 1981 with help from UPIAS. Vic Finkelstein was especially keen to build 'a mass movement' of disabled people in Britain.

- "On 13 June 1981 in London a meeting was organised between UPIAS and eight other national organisations controlled by disabled people, plus a further five organisations being willing to be involved. Its initial name was the National Council of Organisations of Disabled People, soon becoming [BCODP]" (page 15).

UPIAS was disbanded by agreement of the members in November 1990 and the £50 in assets was given to BCODP, the British Council of Organisations of Disabled People. Over its lifetime, it had around 141 members, and around 50 members at any one time.

== Archived records ==
In 2018-19, a substantial number of documents from the leadership of UPIAS were donated to the Greater Manchester Coalition of Disabled People (GMCDP) archive project. Many of these documents remain closed, not available for public inspection, including the 80 Circulars that were produced as a confidential means for UPIAS members to candidly develop their political thinking (Appendix F). The collection includes Vic Finkelstein's letter to Paul Hunt in 1972 asking to join. However, various non-confidential papers are open and a book related to this collection of documents summarises the story of UPIAS.

== Leadership ==
Leading members of UPIAS included Paul Hunt, Vic Finkelstein, Ken Davis and Maggie Davis (née Hines). The Davis' pioneered independent living, by commissioning their own housing scheme at Grove Road in Sutton in Ashfield. After four years of work, including buying the land, working with architects and bringing in some adapted fittings from Sweden, they moved in on 13 September 1976. A video documentary of the project was made in 1982 (page 97).
