= Independent Living Fund =

British disability support fund

The Independent Living Fund was set up in 1988 to fund support for disabled people with high support needs in the United Kingdom, enabling them to live in the community rather than move into residential care.

== History ==
It was run as a non-departmental public body with an office in Nottingham and about 120 staff. It provided support to 19,000 disabled people with the highest levels of need at a cost of about £320 million. It operated as an independent discretionary trust funded by the Department for Work and Pensions (DWP) and was managed by a board of trustees. Its aim was to combat social exclusion on the grounds of disability. The money was generally used to enable disabled people to live in their own homes and to pay for care, and in particular to employ personal assistants. Many of the beneficiaries would otherwise have to move to residential care homes.

== Closure ==
In December 2010 the coalition Government announced the closure of the Fund to new applicants, and in December 2012, following a consultation on the future of the Fund, it was announced that the Fund would be closed permanently from the end of April 2015. The Government claimed that Local Authorities could meet the same outcomes as the ILF and proposed transfer for existing ILF recipients to their Local Authorities.

In May 2014 The Court of Appeal, in the case of Bracking and others v Secretary of State for Work and Pensions found that the Department for Work and Pensions' decision to close the Fund was not lawful, overturning the High Court decision of April 2013. It decided that the department had not complied with the Public Sector Equality Duties imposed by section 149 of the Equality Act 2010. The Court agreed that documents which the Minister, Esther McVey, had seen in the run up to her decision proved that "the Minister did not receive a sufficient understanding of the true threat to independent living for ILF users posed by the proposal to close the fund". Lord Justice McCombe said 'there is simply not the evidence ... to demonstrate to the court that a focussed regard was had to the potentially very grave impact upon individuals in this group of disabled persons, within the context of a consideration of the statutory requirements for disabled people as a whole'.

Following the ruling the DWP carried out a new equality impact assessment to justify the closure. In March 2014 the Government announced the Fund would close on the 30 June 2015.

As part of the closure the Government began transferring funds to Local Authorities, however these funds were not ring fenced as the Government argued doing so would prevent Local Authorities from supporting local needs in a flexible manner. But disability campaigners argued that this leaves the funds open to misappropriation and further cuts.

== Replacement schemes ==
=== Scotland ===
In 2014, the Scottish Government announced they would establish the Independent Living Fund Scotland, to ensure disabled Scottish residents were supported. All Scottish claimants had their cases handed over by July 2015 and £5 million was dedicated to the fund to support new applications.

=== Northern Ireland ===
In May 2015, it was announced that recipients of the Fund in Northern Ireland would be transferred over to Independent Living Fund Scotland.

=== England ===
Following the closure of the Fund in 2015, English recipients had their care transferred over to their Local Authorities.

=== Wales ===
The Welsh Government decided to allow the transfer to Local Authorities but ring fenced the funding. Mark Drakeford, serving as the Cabinet Minister for Health and Care said that the Welsh Government was considering developing a new Welsh ILF body in the future.

To ensure ongoing Fund recipients care was not disrupted, the Welsh Independent Living Grant (WILG) was established. In 2016 it was announced that all WILG recipients would have their care transferred to Local Authorities. This happened between 2017-2019.

The transition caused anger with some recipients, as they were subject to reassessments with their Local Authorities. As a result, some recipients care hours were cut and concerns were raised about how Local Authorities would be able to continue provision with their limited funding.
