= Vic Finkelstein =

Disability activist (1938–2011)

- Born: Victor Berel Finkelstein; 25 January 1938; Johannesburg, Union of South Africa
- Died: 30 November 2011 (aged 73); Stoke Mandeville, Buckinghamshire, UK
- Occupations: Disability rights activist; academic; anti-apartheid activist; psychologist
- Known for: Social model of disability
- Spouse: Elizabeth Lewin (m. 1963–1993)
- Children: 2

Academic background
- Education: University of Natal; University of the Witwatersrand

Academic work
- Discipline: Disability studies
- Institutions: Open University; University of Leeds

Vic Finkelstein (25 January 1938 – 30 November 2011) was a South African-born British disability rights activist and academic, anti-apartheid activist and psychologist. Finkelstein is known as a pioneer of the social model of disability and was a key figure in developing the understanding of the oppression of disabled people.

== Early life and education ==
Victor Berel Finkelstein was born on 25 January 1938 in Johannesburg, Union of South Africa (present-day, South Africa) to a middle class Jewish family. Finkelstein grew up in Durban.

He studied at The University of Natal, Durban and Pietermaritzburg, before taking a Masters in psychology at Witwaterstrand University in Johannesburg. During this time he became involved with anti-apartheid activism.

== Activism ==
In the 1960s, Finkelstein was imprisoned for his anti-apartheid activities. Following a spell of hard labour, he was issued with a five-year banning order (1967–1972) under the Suppression of Communism Act. Finkelstein came to the UK in 1968 as a refugee and joined the emergent British disability movement.

Finkelstein cites his first hand experiences witnessing apartheid and his treatment by South African police as a disabled person, as experiences that initiated new ways of thinking about society and its oppression of disabled people. In the UK in 1972 Finkelstein co-founded Union of the Physically Impaired Against Segregation (UPIAS) with Paul Hunt. UPIAS was the first organisation to reject 'compensatory' and tragic or medical approaches to disability. As an alternative, UPIAS developed attention to the social and structural barriers that oppress people with impairments, rendering them 'disabled'. This led to the development of the social model of disability.

== Academic career ==
Finkelstein was a tutor in disability studies at the Open University and later visiting senior research fellow in the Centre for Disability Studies Leeds University. Vic’s ideas influenced and inspired a generation of disabled activists and gave rise to the development of the Disabled People’s Movement through the formation of Centres for Independent Living, Coalitions of Disabled People and disability arts groups. His work also inspired the creation of Disability Equality Training, Direct Payments and the campaign for civil rights legislation.

== Personal life ==
In 1968, Finkelstein married Elizabeth Lewin, a physiotherapist. Together Finkelstein and Lewin had two children.
