= National Centre for Independent Living =

Non-profit staffed organisation controlled by and run for disabled people

The National Centre for Independent Living (NCIL) was a non-profit staffed organisation controlled by and run for disabled people active in social care issues to campaign for and support the independent living of disabled people in the community and using personal assistants, as opposed to living in institutions such as care homes and hospitals. It ceased its work in December 2011.

== Origins 1989-1995 ==
In 1981 the British Council of Organisations of Disabled People (BCODP) was created. In later years BCODP went through a number of changes in its name and structure, first in 1997 becoming the British Council of Disabled People, and in 2006 the United Kingdom's Disabled People's Council, finally closing in 2017 (BCODP/UKDPC 1981–2017).

NCIL was part of a growing network of local CILs - in her book No Limits, Judy Hunt in chapter eight looks at the broad history of local CILs in England in contrast with those in the US, including four case studies - Derbyshire, Hampshire, Greenwich, and Lambeth.

In 1989 the European Network on Independent Living was formed to campaign for the right to independent living. The creation of ENIL led in the UK to the establishment of an Independent Living Committee of BCODP. The detailed history and policy background of independent living campaigns in the UK is discussed by John Evans in 2003.

== Creation 1996 ==
In 1996 BCODP decided to move from having a committee, and it created a staffed project called the National Centre for independent Living to consolidate and co-ordinate all the policy and campaigning work that was being done around independent living and, in particular, to pursue the campaign for direct payments.

== Community Care (Direct Payments) Act 1996 ==
One of the early achievements of the BCODP Independent Living Committee / NCIL was in persuading the government to bring in legislation to make direct payments for social care lawful. The Community Care (Direct Payments) Act was passed in 1996. Before this law, local authorities with social services departments were using ad-hoc arrangements to make payments via third parties and trust funds to be passed on to disabled people who employed their own personal assistants to pay their wages.

== Creating Independent Futures 2001 ==
On 6 December 2001 a national conference was held at the Old Trafford cricket grounds in Greater Manchester on Creating Independent Futures. The conference had a range of disabled campaigners as speakers, and it was written up by a funded project run by the centre for Disability Studies (CDS) at the University of Leeds in collaboration with NCIL. The research arose from the work of the BCODP Research Committee, chaired by Professor Mike Oliver. This research was guided by a steering group consisting of Peter Beresford, Jane Campbell, John Evans, and Frances Hasler. In 2006 this work was included in a wider book on independent living by Colin Barnes and Geof Mercer, CDS staff members, with Hannah Morgan, the principal researcher.

== Spin-out 2003 ==
In 2003 NCIL became a spin-out independent organisation from BCODP and it was registered as a non-profit company, and later as a charity in 2006. This was an acrimonious change at times, not least because the NCIL project had attracted a substantial proportion of BCODP's total resources.

The NCIL board membership was required to be 75% or more of disabled people, and affiliating organisations had to be promoting at least two of the four principles of:

- independent living,
- direct payments,
- the social model of disability, and
- personal assistants (PAs) users support.

== Right to Control ==
In 2011 NCIL ran an event with the Greater Manchester Coalition of Disabled People (GMCDP) with the Trailblazer projects being run by DPOs (disabled people's organisations) across England as part of the Right to Control initiative.

== Merger 2011 ==
By October 2010 NCIL was informing its members that it was unlikely to be able to continue as a sustainable organisation, which had started with an exploratory meeting on 9 September 2009, and later reinforced with a new Conservative government in the UK in May 2010 committed to a policy of austerity which impacted especially hard on disabled people of working age. It was decided to agree to merge with two other organisations, RADAR and Disability Alliance. This happened on 1 January 2012, creating Disability Rights UK. The last CEO of NCIL was Sue Bott.

== NCIL website ==
Back copies of the NCIL website can be inspected using the Internet Archive's Wayback Machine here.
