= Piss On Pity =

Disability-related neologism

"Piss On Pity" is a rallying cry for those in the disability-inclusive circles of world politics. It has primarily been deployed in protest of charities that fundraise by portraying disabled people as burdensome and helpless. The phrase first appeared on T-shirts, alongside other confrontation slogans such as "Blinded and Crippled by Tragic Disease."

== Etymology ==
The term was likely coined by folk musician, poet, and disabled rights' activist Alan Holdsworth (stage name: Johnny Crescendo) who regularly relies on vulgarity and bold statements in his protest art.

== History ==
"Piss On Pity" was first deployed during the 1990 and 1992 Block Telethon protests outside of ITV Studios in the United Kingdom, in which disabled rights activists attempted to prevent the fundraiser from being televised. The slogan was printed on t-shirts and thousands were sold. The protest successfully platformed the activists and their critiques, which included the lack of representation from disabled folks, as well as their removal from the conversation. Rather than donations to private charity, activists wanted to be seen and included in society on their own terms.

According to its proponents, the implication of the slogan is that pity, while seeming to be a positive, helpful emotion, actually is derogatory. According to them, it is based in conscious or unconscious aversion to disabled people and the ableism that that aversion consciously or unconsciously represents. According to Barbara Lisicki, an organizer of the Block Telethon protests, on the BBC show Network in 1989, "If you make a disabled person an object of charity, you're not going to see them as your equal."

== Legacy ==
"Piss on Pity" was the title of an exhibition by disabled artists, that took place in Wakefield, UK, in 2019. Their artwork reflected the antipathy of the disabled people's movement towards charity. The exhibition showed disabled artists challenging the widespread idea that charity is a force wholly for good.

"Piss on Pity" is the title of a 2013 album of the works of Johnny Crescendo and collaborator Ian Stanton, who both have use music to platform critiques from their experience, as well as other disability activists.

== See also ==
- Disabled People's Direct Action Network
- Disability rights movement
- Independent living
- Kyriarchy
