= National Disability Art Collection and Archive =

The National Disability Arts Collection and Archive (NDACA) is a British collection focusing on Disability Arts which opened in 2019. It was project directed by David Hevey, the current Shape CEO. It consists of an online collection and a facility at the High Wycombe campus of Buckinghamshire New University, and features over 3500 objects. The project is funded by the National Lottery Heritage Fund, and is led by Shape Arts, with David Hevey as the project's creative director, and founded by Tony Heaton.

NDACA is influenced by the social model of disability, looking at the role of disability art relating to the disability rights movement within the UK. It contains a range of artwork, including painting, sculpture, textiles and more, much of which is protest art campaigning about the treatment of disabled individuals at the time. It includes a timeline of the disability rights movement and its associated artwork, including the impact of the Disability Discrimination Act 1995.

In 2020 Shape Arts received funding to create the National Disability Movement Archive and Collection (NDMAC) along similar lines, focusing on the British Disability Rights Movement.

== See also ==
Artists and activists of the Disability Arts Movement include:

- Barbara Lisicki
- Ian Stanton
- Jane Campbell, Baroness Campbell of Surbiton
- Julie McNamara
- Maria Oshodi
- Mat Fraser
- Mik Scarlet
- Nabil Shaban
- Paul Hunt
- Rachel Gadsden
- Steve Cribb
- Tony Heaton
- Vic Finkelstein
