= Devotional medal =

Medal issued for Christian religious devotion

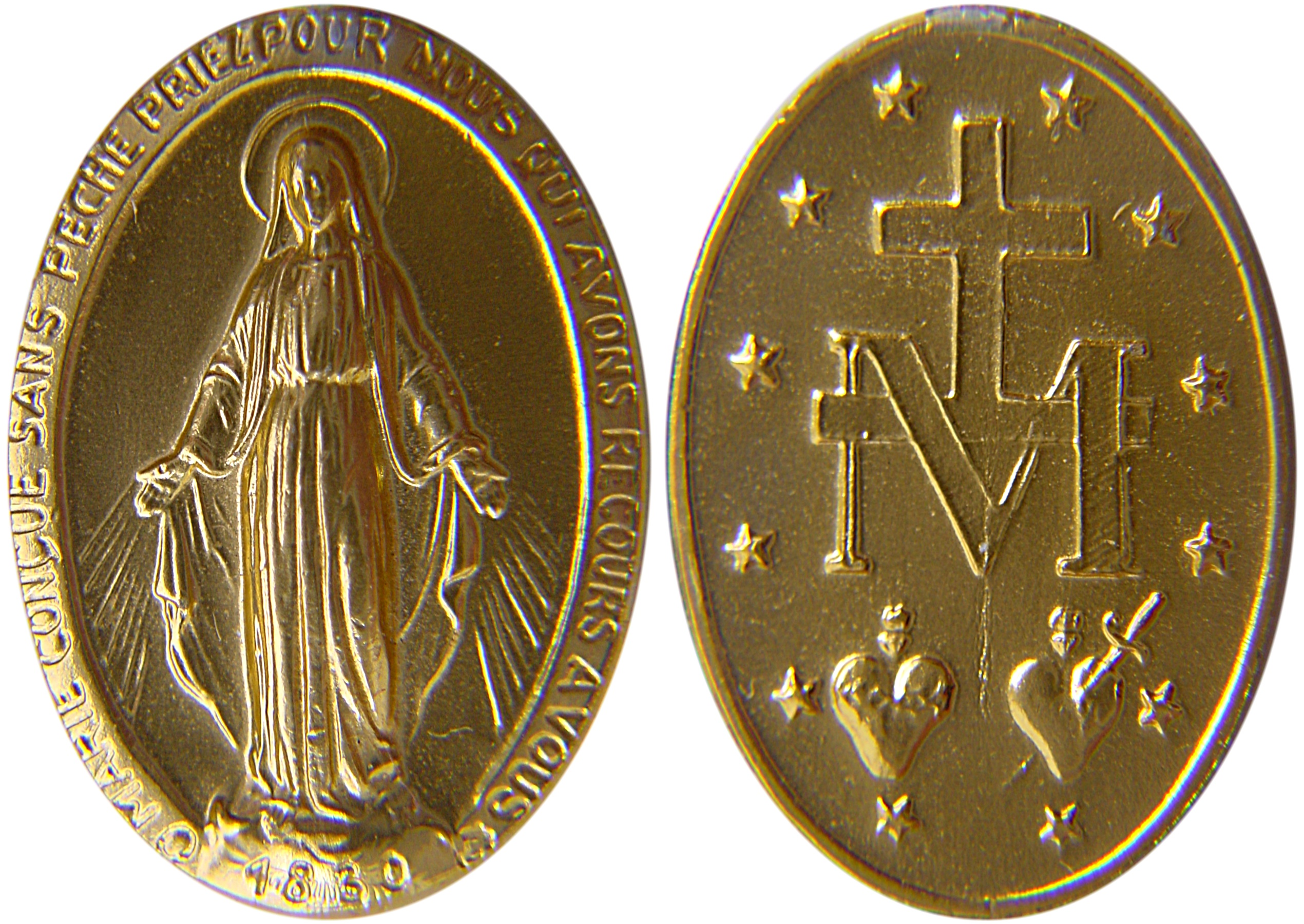
Medal of Our Lady of Graces (best known as "The Miraculous Medal")

A devotional medal is a medal issued for religious devotion.

== History ==
=== In the early church ===
The use of amulets and talismans in pagan antiquity was widespread. The word amuletum itself occurs in Pliny, and many monuments show how objects of this kind were worn around the neck by all classes. Gregory the Great sent to Queen Theodelinda of the Lombards two phylacteria containing a relic of the True Cross and a sentence from the Gospels, which her son Adulovald was to wear around his neck. However, the practice of wearing encolpia (small pectoral crosses) lent itself to abuses when magical formulas began to be joined to Christian symbols, as was regularly the practice of the Gnostics. Some fathers of the fourth and later centuries protested against Gnostic phylacteries worn by Christians. A coin-like object found in catacombs bears on one side a depiction of the martyrdom of a saint, presumably St. Lawrence, who is being roasted upon a gridiron in the presence of the Roman magistrate. The Christian character of the scene is shown by the chi-rho chrisma, the alpha and omega, and the martyr's crown. On the reverse is depicted the tomb of St. Lawrence, while a figure stands in a reverent attitude before it holding aloft a candle.

A second medal, which bears the name of Gaudentianus on the obverse and Urbicus on the reverse, depicts seemingly on one face the sacrifice of Abraham; on the other apparently a shrine or altar, above which three candles are burning, towards which a tall figure carrying a chalice in one hand is conducting a little child. The scene appears to represent the consecration to God of the child as an oblate by his father before the shrine of some martyr, a custom for which there is a good deal of early evidence. Other medals are much more simple, bearing only the Chi Rho with a name or perhaps a cross. Others impressed with more complicated devices can only be dated with difficulty or, as in the case particularly of some representations of the adoration of the Magi which seem to show strong traces of Byzantine influence, belong to a much later period.

Some of the medals or medallions reputedly Christian are stamped upon one side only, and of this class is a bronze medallion of very artistic execution discovered in the cemetery of Domitilla and now preserved in the Vatican Library. It bears two portrait types of the heads of the Apostles SS. Peter and Paul, and is assigned by Giovanni Battista de Rossi to the second century. Other medallions with the (confronted) heads of the two apostles are also known. How far the use of such medals of devotion extended in the early Church is not clear.

=== Medieval medals ===
Although it is probable that the traditions formed around these objects, which were equally familiar at Rome and at Constantinople, never entirely died out, still little evidence exists of the use of medals in the Middle Ages. No traces of such objects that survive are remarkable either for artistic skill or for the value of the metal. In the life of St. Genevieve, it is recounted that St. Germanus of Auxerre, having stopped at Nanterre while on his way to Britain, hung around her neck a perforated bronze coin marked with the sign of the cross, to remind her of having consecrated her virginity to God. The language seems to suggest that an ordinary coin was bored for the purpose. Many of the coins of the late empire were stamped with the chrisma or with the figure of the Saviour, and the ordinary currency may often have been used for similar pious purposes.

In the course of the twelfth century, if not earlier, a very general practice grew up at well-known places of pilgrimage, of casting tokens in lead, and sometimes probably in other metals, which served the pilgrim as a souvenir and stimulus to devotion and at the same time attested the fact that he had duly reached his destination. These signacula (enseignes) known in English as "pilgrims' signs" often took a metallic form and were carried in a conspicuous way upon the hat or breast. Giraldus Cambrensis referring to a journey he made to Canterbury about the year 1180, ten years after the martyrdom of St. Thomas Becket, describes himself and his companions returning to London with the tokens of St. Thomas hanging round their necks. They are also mentioned in the allegorical poem Piers the Plowman. The privilege of casting and selling these pilgrim's signs was a very valuable one and became a regular source of income at most places of religious resort.

The custom was firmly established in Rome itself, and Pope Innocent III, by a letter of 18 January 1200, grants to the canons of St. Peter's the monopoly of casting and selling those "signs of lead or pewter impressed with the image of the Apostles Peter and Paul with which those who visit their thresholds [limina] adorn themselves for the increase of their own devotion and in testimony of the journey which they have accomplished". The pope's language implies that this custom had existed for some time. In form and fashion these pilgrims' signs are various. From about the twelfth century the casting of these devotional objects continued until the close of the Middle Ages and even later, but in the sixteenth or seventeenth century they began to be replaced by medals properly so called in bronze or in silver, often with much greater pretensions to artistic execution.

There was also the custom of casting coin-like tokens in connection with the Feast of Fools, the celebration of the Boy Bishop commonly on the feast of the Holy Innocents. The extant specimens belong mostly to the sixteenth century, but the practice must be much older. Though there is often a burlesque element introduced, the legends and devices shown by such pieces are nearly all religious.

Better deserving of attention are the vast collection of jetons and méreaux which, beginning in the thirteenth century, continued to be produced all through the Middle Ages and lasted on in some places down to the French Revolution. They were produced as counters for use in calculation on a counting board, a lined board similar to an abacus. It soon became the fashion for every personage of distinction, especially those who had anything to do with finance, to have special jetons bearing his own device, and upon some of these considerable artistic skill was lavished. Somewhat similar to modern, non-circulation commemorative coins, these pieces served various purposes, and they were often used in the Middle Ages as a money substitute in games, similar to modern casino or poker chips. Upon nearly half the medieval jetons which survive, pious mottoes and designs are found. Often these jetons were given as presents or "pieces de plaisir" especially to persons of high consideration, and on such occasions they were often specially struck in gold or silver.

One particular and very common use of jetons was to serve as vouchers for attendance at the cathedral offices and meetings of various kinds. In this case they often carried with them a title to certain rations or payments of money, the amount being sometimes stamped on the piece. The tokens thus used were known as jetons de présence or méreaux, and they were largely used, especially at a somewhat later date, to secure the due attendance of the canons at the cathedral offices, etc. However, in many cases the pious device they bore was as much or even more considered than the use to which they were put, and they seem to have discharged a function analogous to later scapulars and holy cards. One famous example is the "méreau d'estaing" bearing stamped upon it the name of Jesus, which were distributed around Paris about 1429. These jetons stamped with the name were probably connected with the work of St. Bernardine of Siena, who actively promoted the devotion to the Holy Name.

Finally for the purpose of largess at royal coronations or for the Maundy money, pieces were often struck which perhaps are rather to be regarded as medals than actual money.

Among the benediction forms of the Middle Ages there is no example found of a blessing for coins.

=== Renaissance ===
Medals properly so called, cast with a commemorative purpose, began, though there are only a few rare specimens, in the last years of the fourteenth century. One of the first certainly known medals was struck for Francesco Carrara (Novello) on the occasion of the capture of Padua in 1390. But practically, the vogue for this form of art was created by Pisanello (c. 1380–1451), the most important commemorative portrait medallist in the first half of the 15th century, and who can claim to have originated this genre. Though not religious in intent many of them possess a strong religious colouring. The beautiful reverse of Pisanello's medal of Malatesta Novello depicts the mail-clad warrior dismounting from his horse and kneeling before a crucifix.

But it was long before this new art made its influence so widely felt as to bring metal representations of saints and shrines, of mysteries and miracles, together with emblems and devices of all kinds in a cheap form into the hands of the people. The gradual substitution of more artistic bronze and silver medals for the rude pilgrim's signs at such sanctuaries as Loreto or St. Peter's, did much to help the general acceptance of medals as objects of devotion. Again, the papal jubilee medals which certainly began as early as 1475, and which from the nature of the case were carried into all parts of the world, must have helped to make the idea familiar.

At some time during the sixteenth century the practice was adopted, possibly following a usage long previously in vogue in the case of Agnus Dei (discs of wax impressed with the figure of a lamb and blessed at stated seasons by the Pope, which could be worn suspended round the neck) of giving a papal blessing to medals and even of enriching them with indulgences. During the revolt of Les Gueux in Flanders in 1566, One or some of these early Geuzen medals was coined with a political message and used by the Gueux faction as a badge. The Spaniards responded by striking a medal with the head of the Saviour and on the reverse the image of Our Lady of Hal; Pius V granted an indulgence to those who wore this medal in their hats.

From this the custom of blessing and indulgencing medals is said to have rapidly expanded. Certain it is that Sixtus V attached indulgences to some ancient coins discovered in the foundations of the buildings at the Scala Santa, which coins he caused to be richly mounted and sent to persons of distinction. Encouraged further by the vogue of the jubilee and other papal medals, the use of these devotional objects spread to every part of the world. Austria and Boherma seem to have taken the lead in introducing the fashion into central Europe, and some exceptionally fine specimens were produced under the inspiration of the Italian artists whom the Emperor Maximilian invited to his court. Some of the religious medals cast by Antonio Abondio and his pupils at Vienna are of the highest order of excellence. But in the course of the sixteenth and seventeenth centuries almost every considerable city in Catholic Europe came to have craftsmen of its own who followed the industry.

== Types ==
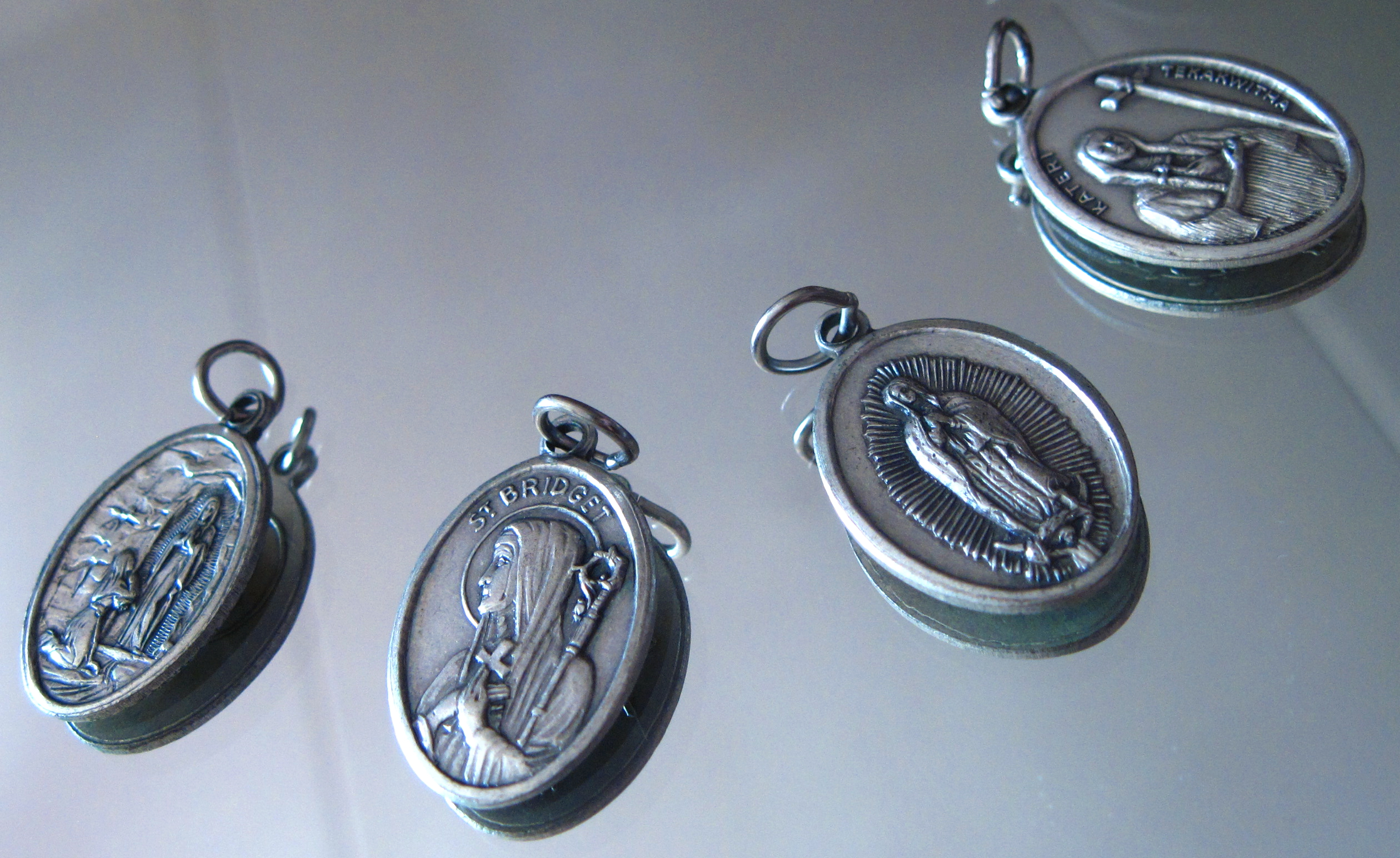
Four Catholic devotional medals. From left to right, they depict the apparition of Our Lady of Lourdes; St. Bridget; Our Lady of Guadalupe; and St. Kateri Tekakwitha.

Apart from the common run of pious medals, a number of various religious pieces were produced connected with places, confraternities, religious orders, saints, mysteries, miracles, devotions, &c., and other familiar types.

=== Plague medals ===
Struck and blessed as a protection against pestilence, these medals vary. Subjects include St. Sebastian and St. Roch, different shrines of the Blessed Virgin, and often a view of some particular city. Round them are commonly inscribed letters analogous to those depicted on the Saint Benedict Medal, for example +. z +. D. I. A. These and other series of letters stand for "Crux Christi salva, nos"; "Zelus domus Dei libera me"; "Crux Christi vincit et regnat per lignum crucis; libera me, Domine, ab hac peste; Deus meus, expelle pestem et libera me, etc.

=== Medals commemorating miracles of the Eucharist ===
There were a very large number of these struck for jubilees, centenaries, etc., in the different places where these miracles were believed to have happened, often adorned with very quaint devices. There is one for example, commemorative of the miracle at Seefeld, upon which the story is depicted of a nobleman who demanded to receive a large host at communion like the priest's. The priest complies, but as a punishment for the nobleman's presumption the ground opens and swallows him up.

=== Private medals ===
Individuals may commission medals to commemorate events such as baptisms, first communions, or deaths. These medals are typically distributed to friends.

Medals commemorating a baptism, also called "sponsor medals" or "pathen medaillen", may record the precise hour of a child's birth so that the horoscope can be calculated.

=== Medals commemorative of special legends ===
Of this class the famous Cross of Saint Ulrich of Augsburg may serve as a specimen. A cross is supposed to have been brought by an angel to St. Ulrich that he might bear it in his hands in the great battle against the Magyars, A.D. 955. Freisenegger's monograph "Die Ulrichs-kreuze" (Augsburg, 1895) enumerates 180 types of this object of devotion sometimes in cross, sometimes in medal form, often associated with the medal of St. Benedict.

== Papal medals ==
Although not precisely devotional in purpose, a very large number of Papal medals commemorate ecclesiastical events of various kinds, often the opening and closing of the Holy Door in the years of Jubilee. The series begins with the pontificate of Martin V in 1417, and continues to the present. Some types professing to commemorate the acts of earlier popes, e.g. the Jubilee of Boniface VIII, are reconstructions or fabrications of later date.

Nearly all the most noteworthy actions of each pontificate for the last five hundred years have been commemorated by medals in this manner, and some of the most famous artists such as Benvenuto Cellini, Carsdosso, and others have designed them. The family of the Hamerani, papal medalists from 1605 to about 1807, supplied most of that vast series, and are celebrated for their work.

== Other semi-devotional medals ==
Other types of medals have been struck by important religious associations, as for example by the Knights of Malta, by certain abbeys in commemoration of their abbots, or in connection with particular orders of knighthood. On some of these series of medals useful monographs have been written, as for example the work of Canon H. C. Schembri, on "The Coins and Medals of the Knights Of Malta" (London, 1908).

The Agnus Deis seem to have been blessed by the popes with more or less solemnity from an early period. In the sixteenth century this practice was greatly developed. The custom grew up of the pontiff blessing rosaries, "grains" medals, enriching them with indulgences and sending them, through his privileged missionaries or envoys, to be distributed to Catholics in England. On these occasions a paper of instructions was often drawn up defining exactly the nature of these indulgences and the conditions on which they could be gained. The Apostolic Indulgences attached to medals, rosaries and similar objects by all priests duly authorized, are analogous to these. They are imparted by making a simple sign of the cross, but for certain other objects, e.g. the medal of St. Benedict, more special faculties are required, and an elaborate form of benediction is provided. In 1911 Pius X sanctioned the use of a blessed medal to be worn in place of the brown and other scapulars.

== Collections of devotional medals ==
Steve Cribb's collection of over 10,000 devotional medals is now in the British Museum and the University Museum of Bergen collections.

== Sources ==
- Franz, Kirchlichen Benedictionen im Mittelalter, II, 271-89
- Le Canoniste Contemporain
- Mazerolle, Les Médailleurs Français, 1902–1904
- the monographs by Pfeiffer and Ruland, "Pestilentia, in Nummis", Tübingen, 1882, and "Die deutschen Pestainulette", Leipzig, 1885

Catholic Saints Medals and Their Meanings

Hamsa Hand Necklace Meanings The Tree of Life Jewelry Collection Claddagh Ring Meaning

Promise Ring Meaning Pearl Earrings Hoop Earrings Initial Pendants Name Necklaces Birthstone Jewelry Solitaire Pendant Cross Pendant Heart Pendant Mother's Jewelry Tennis Jewelry Chain Bracelet Bangle Bracelet Cuban Link Bracelet Statement Ring Stackable Rings Eternity Band Engagement Ring Men's Jewelry Vintage Style Jewelry Gemstone Rings
