= Then Barbara Met Alan =

Disability television drama

- Written by: Jack Thorne; Genevieve Barr
- Directed by: Bruce Goodison; Amit Sharma
- Starring: Ruth Madeley; Arthur Hughes
- Country of origin: United Kingdom
- Original language: English

Production
- Executive producers: Jack Thorne; Richard Bond; Tom Pullen
- Producers: Bryony Arnold; Debbie Shuter
- Cinematography: Susanne Salavati
- Running time: 67 minutes
- Production companies: Dragonfly Film and TV; One Shoe Films

Original release
- Network: BBC Two; Netflix
- Release: 21 March 2022 (UK)

Then Barbara Met Alan is a 2022 British television drama film about Barbara Lisicki and Alan Holdsworth, the founders of DAN (Disabled People's Direct Action Network), a disability activism group. It is written by Jack Thorne and Genevieve Barr and stars Ruth Madeley and Arthur Hughes. It broadcast on BBC Two on 21 March 2022.

== Plot ==
After meeting in 1989 at a gig, two cabaret performers, comedian Barbara and activist-performer Alan, fall in love. Fueled by their passion and life experiences of mistreatment by an ableist society, they help found DAN, the Disabled People's Direct Action Network and lead protests for disabled people's rights which eventually lead to the Disability Discrimination Act 1995. As the movement grows and the pair have a child of their own, the pressure begins to wear on their relationship.

== Cast ==
- Ruth Madeley as Barbara Lisicki
- Arthur Hughes as Alan Holdsworth
- Phillipa Cole as Sue
- Mat Fraser as Mat
- Liz Carr as Liz

== Production ==
The project had the working titles of Piss on Pity and later Independence Day? How Disabled Rights Were Won. During his MacTaggart Lecture at the Edinburgh TV Festival, Thorne said this was the first time he had a budget comparable to regular television drama for a disability-centered project. Concerning production difficulties in general, this lecture referenced a forthcoming report by Screen Skills written by four writers including Jack Thorne and Genevieve Barr, and it debated the ideas behind a forthcoming campaign of the same name, Underlying Health Conditions, concerning TV and disabled people.

The production prioritized disabled talent and visibility, including 17 disabled actors, 55 disabled supporting actors and 50% senior editorial team representation, in addition to extra help from disability groups as consultants and co-ordinators. Lisicki was also involved in the production, providing archival materials and historical consultancy.

== Historical alterations ==
Some historical events and people depicted were altered for dramatic purposes. These include:

- The Block Telethon protests in 1990 and 1992 were organised under the name of Campaign to Stop Patronage,
- DAN was formally created in the spring of 1993 by around 16 disabled people at a weekend meeting in Norwich,
- Some of the later protest events in the film around the compromised Disability Discrimination Act 1995 were organised by a disability campaign called Rights Now! although most DAN members took part in these protests too.

== Reception ==
The film received positive reviews, commending the performances, storytelling and attitude towards disability. Several reviews also noted the presentation of a disabled sex scene on mainstream television. Jack Seale of The Guardian awarded the film five out of five stars, declaring it a 'rollicking fact-based drama'. Sean O'Grady of The Independent also gave it five out of five stars and remarked the film, '(is) as much a moving love story and wryly amusing sitcom as it is an emotionally charged chronicle of a small revolution.' He also praised Madeley and Hughes' performances. Ben Dowell of The Times gave it four out five stars. The Daily Telegraph also gave it four out five stars.

In an article for The Guardian, disability activist and author Frances Ryan extolled the programme's highlighting of an undercelebrated part of civil rights history, as well as its handling of disabled representation on television.

== Awards ==
At the 2023 Broadcast Awards, the film won "Best Single Drama".
