= Bashall =

Bashall may refer to:

- Bashall Brook, minor river in the English county of Lancashire, England
- Bashall Eaves, village in the Ribble Valley district of Lancashire, England
- James Bashall CBE, the current General Officer Commanding 1st (UK) Armoured Division
- Ruth Bashall (1952-2023), British lesbian activist
