= Carl Rasmussen =

Danish painter

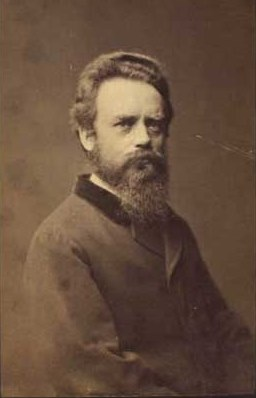
Jens Erik Carl Rasmussen (ca. 1870)

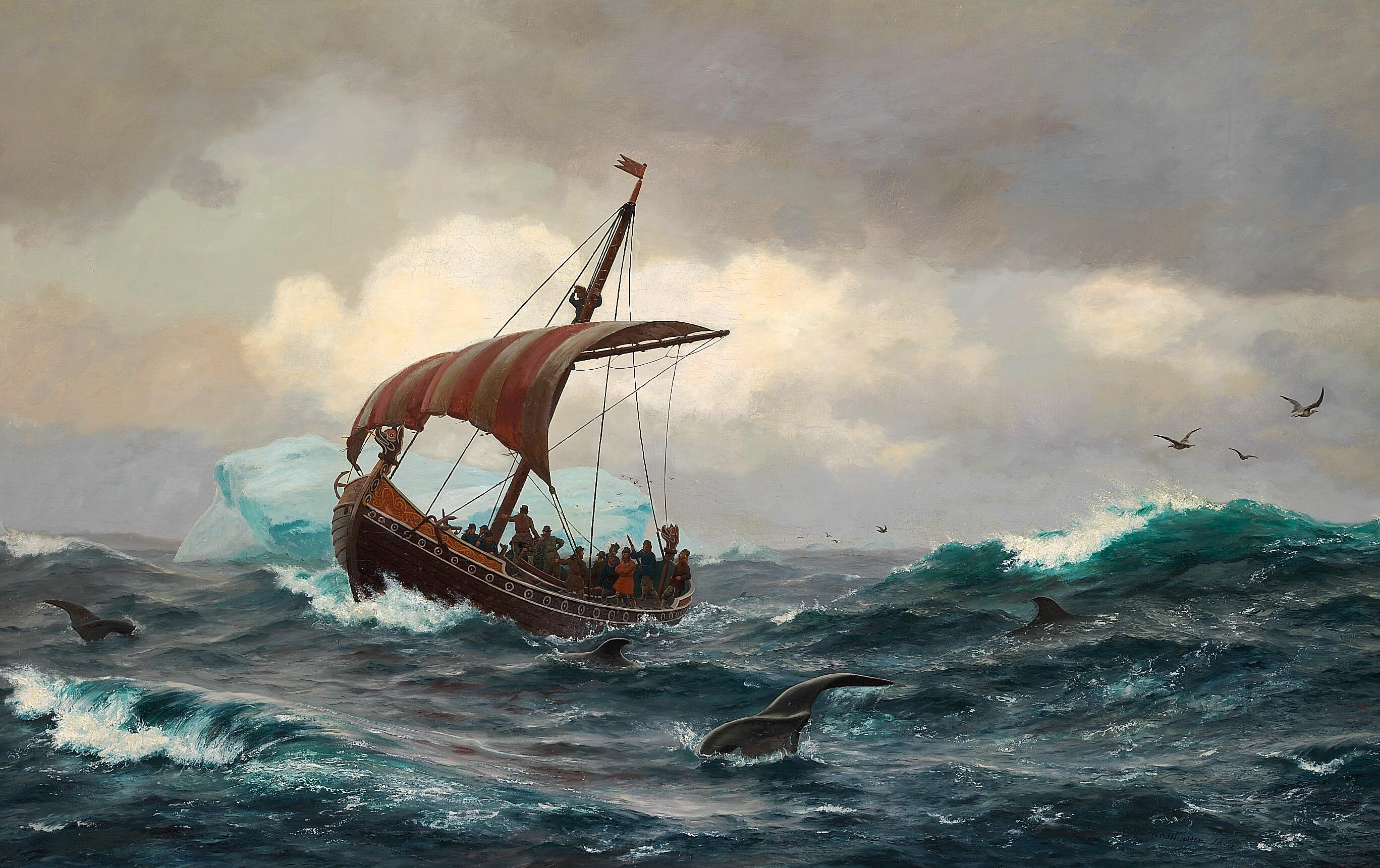
Summer night off the Greenland coast circa year 1000 (1875)

Jens Erik Carl Rasmussen (31 August 1841 – 1 October 1893) was a Danish painter best known for his marine art and scenes of Greenland.

== Biography ==
Rasmussen was born at Ærøskøbing in Ærø, Denmark. He was the son of Johan Aranth Rasmussen and Caroline Sophie Kaasden. He was the eldest of eleven children born to a master tailor who later became City Treasurer. At fifteen, he went to Copenhagen to learn the hosiery trade and completed his training in 1861. While there, however, he was attracted to the art works he saw and took drawing lessons with the architects Hans J. Holm and C. V. Nielsen . Later, he took lessons with the animal painter Didrik Frisch.

In need of some immediate income, he took passage as a cabin boy on a relative's merchant ship and visited Scotland; painting several works along the way. Upon returning, he enrolled in courses at the Copenhagen Technical College to improve his understanding of perspective.

He studied until 1866 with the landscape painter, Carl Frederik Aagaard. His first showing was at the Charlottenborg Spring Exhibition in 1863. He would exhibit there regularly until his death.

Inspired by his sailing experience, he visited Greenland in 1870–71, making sketches that later became paintings, one of which was purchased for the Royal Collection. In 1872, he was able to obtain a scholarship to the Royal Danish Academy of Fine Arts, which led him through the Netherlands, Belgium and Italy and galleries in Paris, Dresden and Berlin.

By 1880, he had become successful enough to marry his cousin Anna Egidia Rasmussen (1852-1931) with whom he would have eight children. He bought a home and establish a studio in Marstal on Ærø. His first work there was a large mural at Marstal Church, depicting Jesus calming the waters, which featured portraits of prominent local citizens.

In 1893, he was returning from Greenland on the brig Peru when he apparently fell overboard and drowned. He died between Orkney and Shetland. He was last seen by the helmsman, standing aft with his easel. When he was reported missing, an extensive search of the area was conducted, but they were unable to find him.

His life became the subject of a novel Sidste rejse (Stockholm: Ordfront förlag. 2007) by Carsten Jensen.

The largest collection of his works is at the Marstal Søfartsmuseum in Ærø, the M/S Maritime Museum of Denmark in Helsingør, Svendborg Museum, Ribe Kunstmuseum and Christiansborg Palace.

== Gallery ==
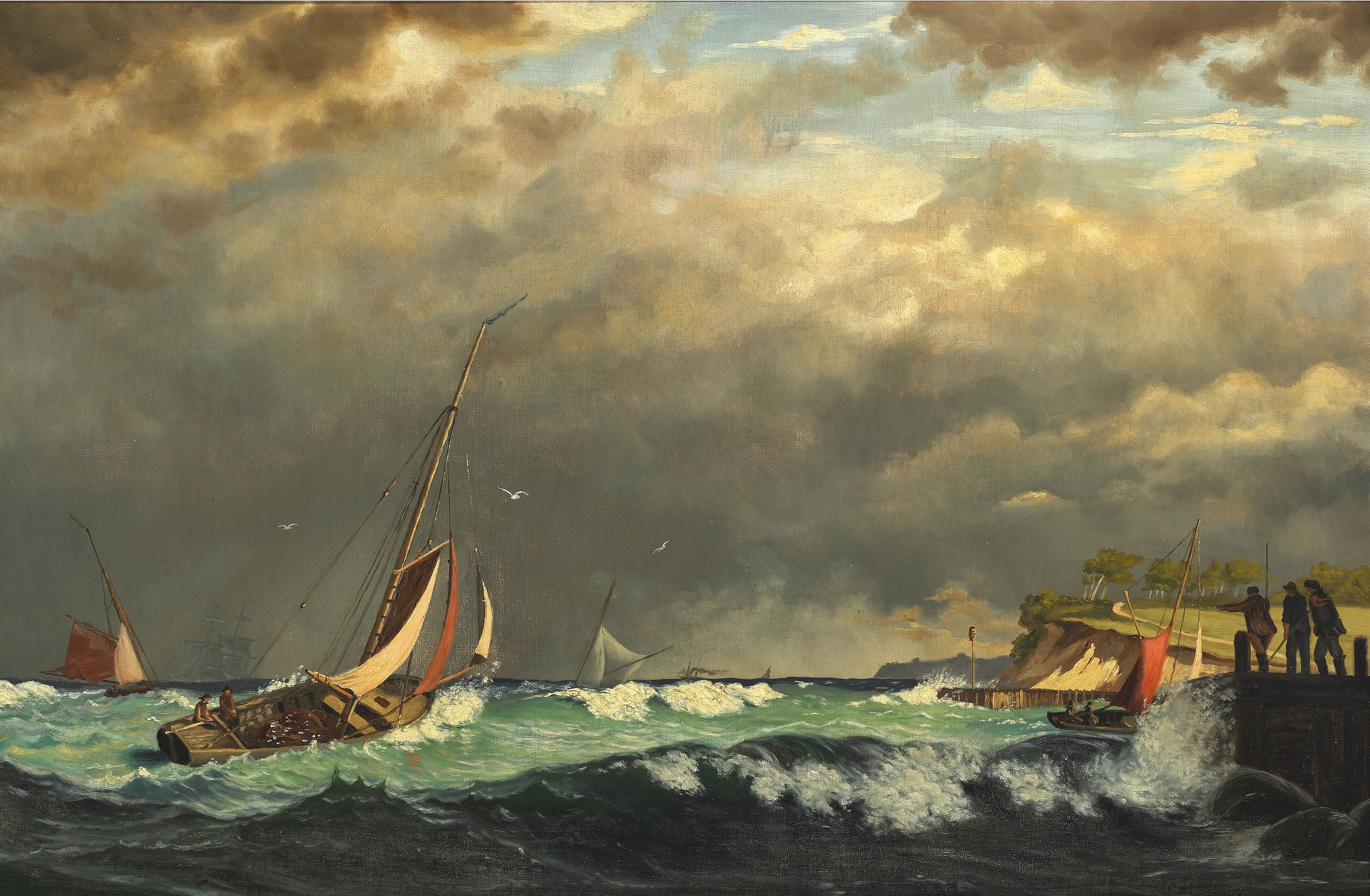
Sailing boats off a harbour in stormy weather

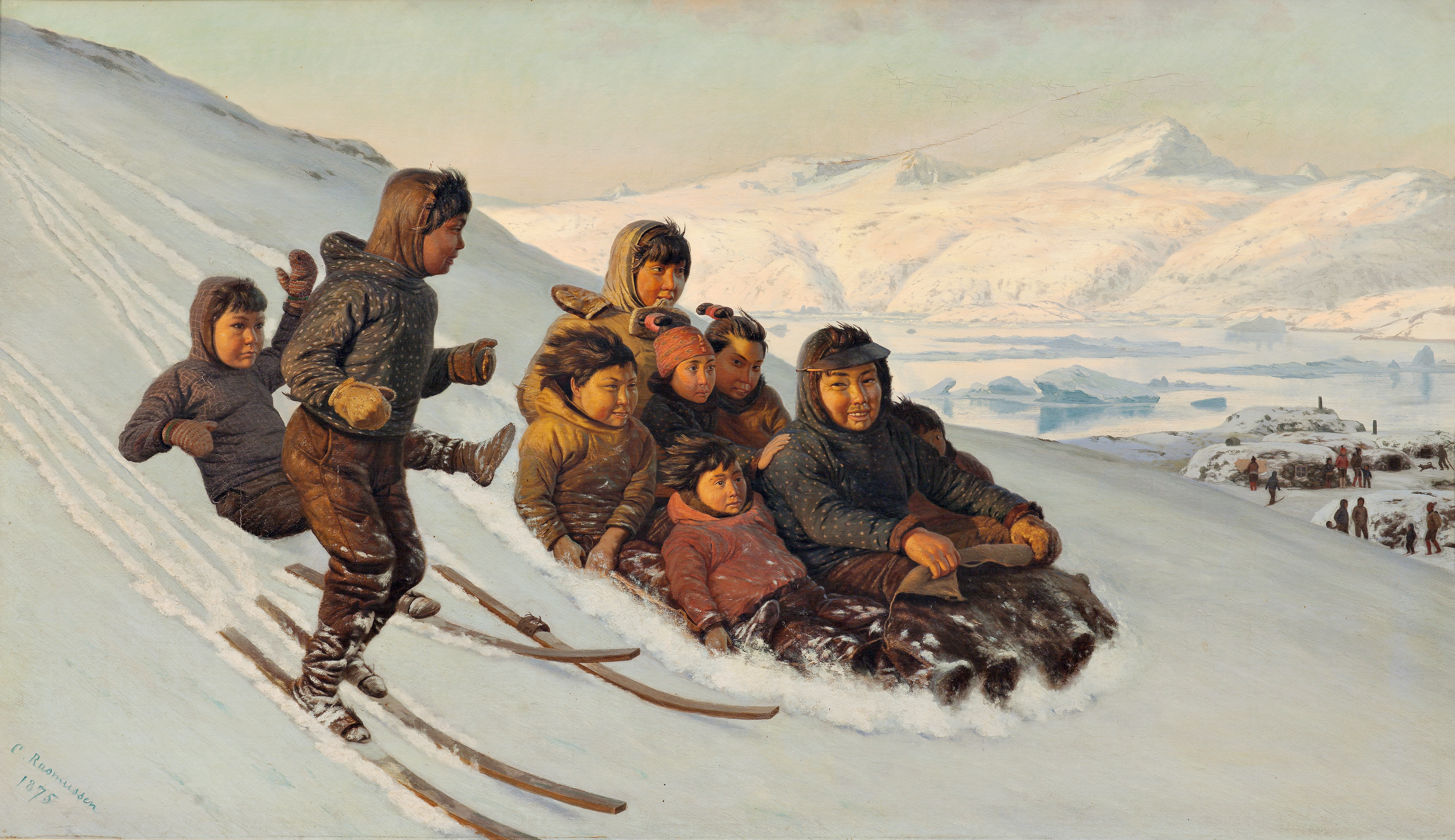
Wintertime in Greenland

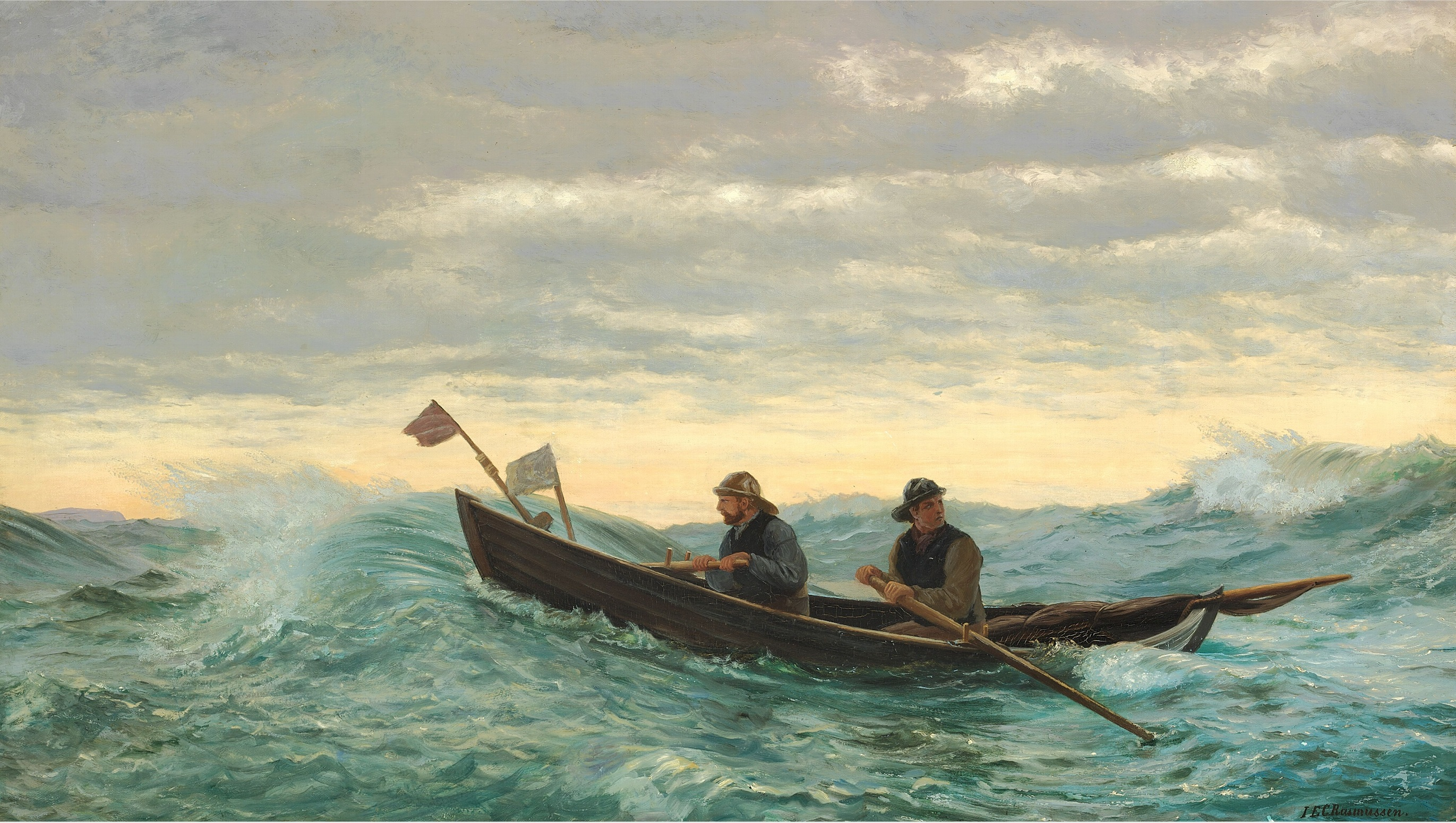
Father and son tending the nets

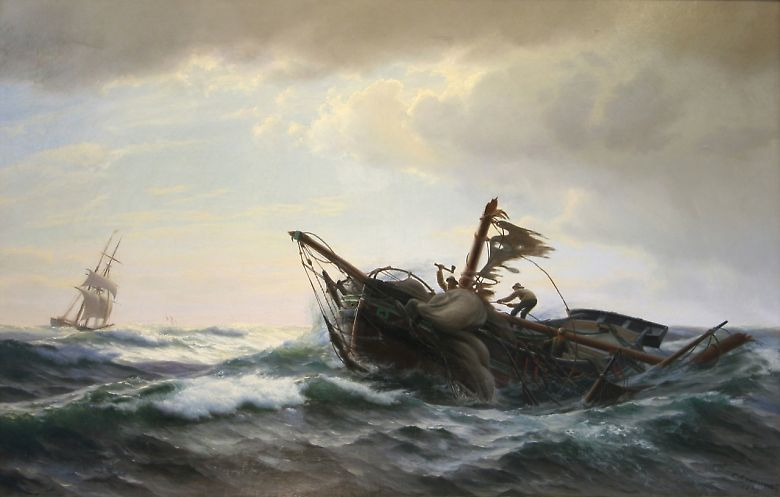
Yacht shipwreck
