= Ruth Madeley =

British actress (born 1987)

- Ruth Madeley at the 2026 Toronto International Film Festival
- Born: 4 August 1987 (age 39); Westhoughton, Lancashire, England
- Education: Edge Hill University
- Occupation: Actress
- Years active: 2009–present
- Spouse: Joe Lawrence (m. 2024)

Ruth Madeley (born 4 August 1987) is an English actress. For her performance in the BBC Three film Don't Take My Baby (2015), she received a British Academy Television Award nomination. She was named a BAFTA Breakthrough Brit. She went on to star in the BBC One series Years and Years (2019), Nightsleeper (2024) and The Rapture (2026). She also had recurring roles in the Starz series The Rook (2019) and the BBC series Doctor Who (2023–2025). Her films include Being Heumann (2026).

Madeley was born with spina bifida and has worked with the charity Whizz Kidz for much of her life.

== Early life and education ==
Ruth Madeley was born in Westhoughton, and was diagnosed with spina bifida six weeks before she was born. She has an older sister named Elizabeth. Her father worked in customer services and her mother was a nurse. When Madeley was 5 years old, the charity Whizz Kidz provided funding for a custom wheelchair for her. Madeley volunteered for Whizz Kidz throughout her childhood and was part of the Kidz Board youth panel. As part of her work with Whizz Kidz, at the age of 13, she visited Cherie Blair at 10 Downing Street to discuss fundraising and awareness. At 14, she received another wheelchair from the charity.

When she was 13, while a pupil at Mount St Joseph School, Farnworth, she was awarded the Princess Diana Memorial Award for young people. In 2004, aged 17, she was awarded the first Bolton Wanderers' Community Hero award.

Madeley attended Thornleigh Salesian College and later studied English and creative writing with a focus on scriptwriting at Edge Hill University, and graduated with a First Class Honours degree.

== Career ==
In 2012, Madeley wrote and starred in the made for television film Lime Pictures Scrims. She has had several supporting roles in television, including Fresh Meat and The Level.

She starred as Anna in the 2015 TV movie Don't Take My Baby, chronicling a disabled couple's fight to prevent their baby from being taken away, and was nominated for a Best Actress TV BAFTA for her performance. The following year, she was listed as one of BAFTA's 18 Breakthrough Brits. At the time of filming, Madeley was working in fundraising at Whizz Kidz. She returned to the job after her BAFTA win, thinking there would not be enough roles for disabled actresses for her to make a career in acting.

In Russell T. Davies' 2019 BBC/HBO miniseries, Years and Years, Madeley played Rosie Lyons. The role of Rosie was not originally written for a wheelchair user but after her audition, Davies decided to work with Madeley to reshape the role around her spina bifida. Madeley took a six-month sabbatical from her job at Whizz Kidz to film the role. When she attempted to return to the job, she found she had landed another acting role. Madeley asked her boss if she could extend the sabbatical but her boss assured her that the sabbatical did not make sense as she was "an actress now".

Also in 2019, she played Ingrid Woodhouse in the television adaptation of Daniel O'Malley's The Rook.

In 2019, Madeley signed an open letter urging Hollywood executives to normalise disability by casting disabled actors to play disabled characters. In 2020, she appeared in the Christmas special episode of Would I Lie to You? and appeared in Mat Fraser's CripTales, a collection of disability monologues. In 2021, she competed on Celebrity Best Home Cook and played Throat in the television adaptation of Terry Pratchett's Discworld novel, The Watch.

In 2021, she was cast in the BBC One comedy series, The Cleaner and starred as Barbara Lisicki in the 2022 BBC Two drama, Then Barbara Met Alan. She also appeared in Tom Stern and Celyn Jones' film, The Almond and The Seahorse, inspired by Kaite O'Reilly's play of the same name.

Madeley's first theatre role was in The Greatest Wealth at The Old Vic in 2018. The Greatest Wealth consisted of seven monologues and was put together in celebration of the 70th anniversary of the NHS. Madeley's monologue, "Choice & Control" was written by Matilda Ibini. In late 2019 and early 2020, she played Barbara 'Buck' Buckingham in Teenage Dick at the Donmar Warehouse directed by Michael Longhurst. The play, written by Mike Lew, was inspired by Shakespeare's Richard III. The character of Buck was based on the character of the Duke of Buckingham and was explicitly written to be played by a disabled actor.

In September 2021, it was announced that she would star alongside Colin Baker and Bonnie Langford in the Big Finish Doctor Who audio dramas as a new companion of the Sixth Doctor, marine biologist Hebe Harrison. The boxset, The Sixth Doctor Adventures: Water Worlds, was released in May 2022. She was cast as Shirley Anne Bingham in the television series' 2023 specials, which were written by Davies, who had returned as showrunner.

Madeley and Ruben Reuter appeared in a documentary from Channel 4 on disability and abortion titled Disability and Abortion: The Hardest Choice. The documentary aired in August 2022.

In May 2025, Madeley was cast as disability rights activist Judith Heumann in Being Heumann, a biographical drama directed by Sian Heder and based on Heumann's memoir Being Heumann: An Unrepentant Memoir of a Disability Rights Activist. The film premiered as the opening film of the 2026 Toronto International Film Festival on 10 September 2026 and is scheduled for a limited theatrical release on 6 November 2026, followed by its debut on Apple TV+ on 13 November 2026.

In 2026 she plays her first lead role in the BBC One apocalyptic drama TV series The Rapture, based on the book by Liz Jensen. Madeley is also an executive producer on the series. After airing in July 2026, her performance earned praise from critics.

== Personal life ==
As of 2016 Madeley was continuing her work with Whizz Kidz as a fundraiser and, in 2019, was recognised as a patron of the charity.

She has been with her partner, Joe Lawrence, since 2012 and they married in 2024. The two have known each other since they were young.

She is a supporter of Bolton Wanderers F.C.

== Filmography ==
=== Film ===
Year	Title	Role	Notes	Ref.
2018	Ashes	Short films		Erica
2020	The Uncertain Kingdom: Verisimilitude	Short films	Bella	
2021	Canvas 5	Short films	Ruth Betteridge	
2022	The Almond and the Seahorse	Jenny		
2026	Being Heumann	Judith Heumann		

=== Television ===
Year	Title	Role	Notes
2009	Half Moon Investigations	Fran	Episode 8: "Sick Note"
2011	Fresh Meat	Sal	1 episode
2012	Scrims	Jak	Television film
2015	Don't Take My Baby	Anna Watson	Television film
2016	Outnumbered	Jill	Christmas special
2016	The Level	Julie	6 episodes (series 1)
2017	The Idris Takeover	Janine	2 episodes
2017	Cold Feet	Tracey McHarrie	5 episodes (series 7)
2017	Katy	Helen	2 episodes (series 1)
2018	Horizon:	Herself - presenter	Docuseries, episode: "Spina Bifida and Me"
2019	Brexit: The Uncivil War	Leave supporter	Television film
2019	Pure	Abby	1 episode
2019	Years and Years	Rosie Lyons	Miniseries, main role
2019	The Rook	Ingrid Woodhouse	8 episodes
2019	The Accident	Laura Tucker	3 episodes
2020	Save Me Too	DS Pip Bleasdell	1 episode
2020	Would I Lie to You?	Herself – panellist	Episode: "At Christmas"
2020	Celebrity Mastermind	Herself – contender	1 episode
2020	Criptales	Sue	2 episodes
2020–2021	The Watch	Throat	3 episodes
2021	Celebrity Best Home Cook	Herself – contestant	3 episodes (series 1)
2021	The Last Leg	Herself - guest	3 episodes
2021	The Cleaner	Helena	Episode: "The Neighbour"
2022	Then Barbara Met Alan	Barbara Lisicki	Television film
2022	Disability and Abortion: The Hardest Choice	Herself – presenter	Documentary
2022–2023	Brassic	Clara Marie	2 episodes (series 4–5)
2023	The Long Shadow	WPC Judy Womack	Miniseries, episode 2
2023	The Unique Boutique	Herself – narrator	
2023; 2025	Doctor Who	Shirley Ann Bingham	Recurring role. 2023 specials, Series 15
2024	Rob Beckett's Smart TV	Herself	1 episode
2024	Renegade Nell	Mrs. Miller	Episode 7: "Stop Printing This Muck"
2024	Nightsleeper	Chrissy Doolan	Main role
2024	Celebrity Catchphrase	Herself – contestant	1 episode
2025	The War Between the Land and the Sea	Shirley Ann Bingham	Main role
2025	Blankety Blank	Herself	1 episode
2026	Who Do You Think You Are?	Herself	1 episode
2026	The Rapture	Dr Gabrielle Fox	Main role

== Theatre ==
- 2018: Performed "Choice & Control" monologue in The Greatest Wealth.
- 2019–2020: Barbara 'Buck' Buckingham in Teenage Dick

== Awards and nominations ==
Year	Award	Category	Work	Result	Refs
2016	BAFTA TV Awards	Best actress	Don't Take My Baby	Nominated	
2022	Stylist's Remarkable Women Awards	Change Maker of the Year Award	N/A	Won	
