= Holly Gibbs =

English actress

- Born: Holly Uma Gibbs; 25 August 1997 (age 29); London, England
- Occupation: Actress
- Years active: 2000–2016

Holly Uma Gibbs (born 25 August 1997) is an English actress, best known for her roles as Christianna in the film Nanny McPhee and Milly in The Story of Tracy Beaker. She is the daughter of former actress Claire Toeman. She appeared in Teensville for the BBC, about the Jewish Bar Mitzvah celebration. She went on to study art in London.

In 2022, she began presenting a YouTube series From Early, where she discusses her experiences as a child actress and speaks to other actors who began their careers as children. Her guests included Eliza Bennett, whom she appeared alongside in the film Nanny McPhee, two of her The Story of Tracy Beaker co-stars Dani Harmer and Jack Edwards, as well as Daniel Roche and Theo Stevenson.

== Filmography ==
Year	Film	Role	Notes
2005	Nanny McPhee	Chrissie Brown	Supporting role
2005	The Story of Tracy Beaker	Milly	Recurring Role
2007	Secret Life	Chloe	TV movie
2007	Talk to Me	Charlotte	TV series
2009	Burnt by the Sun	Nadia	Play
2010	When the Rain Comes	Sam	Short Film; awarded Best Young Actress at the International Short Film Festival.
2011	Love's Kitchen	Michelle	Film
2016	Mob Handed	Holly	Film

== Awards and nominations ==
Year	Category	Award	Result
2007	Best Young Ensemble in a Feature Film Shared with Thomas Sangster, Eliza Bennett, Jennifer Rae Daykin, Raphaël Coleman & Samuel Honywood.	Young Artist Award	Nominated
2010	Best Young Actress in a Short Film	British Independent Film Society	Won
