= The Rapture (TV series) =

British television series

- Genre: Psychological thriller
- Based on: The Rapture by Liz Jensen
- Screenplay by: Bryony Kimmings; Rebecca Manley
- Directed by: Eva Sigurđardóttir; Jennifer Perrott
- Starring: Ruth Madeley; India Amarteifio; Sam Hazeldine; Jack Farthing; Iwan Rheon; Siena Kelly; Ruth Jones; Stephen Campbell Moore
- Composer: Dominik Scherrer
- Country of origin: United Kingdom
- Original language: English
- No. of series: 1
- No. of episodes: 5

Production
- Executive producers: Rebecca Durbin; Tom Leggett; Ruth Madeley; Damien Timmer; Danielle Scott Haughton
- Producers: Betsan Morris Evans; Joanna Crow
- Production location: Wales
- Running time: 57 minutes
- Production company: Mammoth Screen

Original release
- Network: BBC One
- Release: 26 July – 9 August 2026

The Rapture is a British psychological thriller television series starring Ruth Madeley. It is an adaptation of the book of the same name by Liz Jensen. The series premiered on 26 July 2026 on BBC One.

== Premise ==
A forensic psychologist working in a high-security unit becomes intrigued by a juvenile patient.

== Cast and characters ==
- Ruth Madeley as Dr. Gabrielle Fox
- India Amarteifio as Bethany Krall
- Sam Hazeldine as Leonard Krall
- Jack Farthing as Frasier Melville
- Iwan Rheon as Dick Carwyn
- Siena Kelly as Anika Drake
- Ruth Jones as Mel Thomas
- Stephen Campbell Moore as Max Leland
- Lisa Palfrey as Caroline Wren MP
- Naby Dakhil as Rafiq Khemiri
- Richard Elis as Ed Blanchette
- Dean Rehman as Dr. Ehmet
- Robert Rhodes as Simon 'Sonic' Keegan
- Katie Clarkson-Hill as Daisy Stokes
- Catherine Steadman as Nina Pearce

== Production ==
The five-part series is produced by Mammoth Screen and written by Bryony Kimmings and Rebecca Manley, adapted from the 2009 novel of the same name by Liz Jensen. It was first announced in April 2023.

It is directed by Eva Sigurđardóttir and Jennifer Perrott. It is produced by Betsan Morris Evans and Joanna Crow with executive producers Rebecca Durbin, Tom Leggett, Ruth Madeley, Damien Timmer and Danielle Scott Haughton.

Madeley leads the cast which also includes Sam Hazeldine, Jack Farthing, Iwan Rheon, Siena Kelly and Ruth Jones, as well as Stephen Campbell Moore, Lisa Palfrey, Naby Dakhil, Richard Elis, Dean Rehman and Robert Rhodes.

Filming took place on location in Wales in October 2025.

== Broadcast ==
The series premiered on 26 July 2026 on BBC One and BBC iPlayer.

== Reception ==
As of September 2026 review aggregator Rotten Tomatoes reports an overal rating of 78% based on 9 reviews.

Lucy Mangan of The Guardian gave The Rapture 3 out of 5 stars based on the first two episodes, praising its timeliness (the UK being in the middle of an extreme heatwave), and writing "There is an awful lot going on in [the series]", and "The overall effect is chaotic", but "Nevertheless, the Rapture has smaller-scale scenes and moments that work incredibly well". The Glasgow Herald praises Ruth Madeley's performance in her first lead role, although says that the series "struggles to maintain the pace needed to keep the viewer alongside and not asking too many questions". Barbara Ellen, writing in The Observer, criticised the plot somewhat but praised the characterisations and the performances, both of the leads as well as supporting actors.
