= Sophus Black =

Sophus Black (2 May 1882 – 22 December 1960) was a Danish telegraph manager and art collector.

Born in Marstal, Denmark, Black was hired after preliminary diploma in 1900 Danish company Great Northern Telegraph Company and immediately thereafter posted in London. Subsequently, he was for twenty nine years from 1902 to 1931 stationed in China, first in Shanghai, then from 1907 in Peking, where from 1919 he served as manager of among other things, the company's station in Hong Kong. Sophus Black was early preoccupied with Chinese culture. He learned the language, lived custom of the country, understood and respected Chinese mentality and began collecting distinguished Chinese art and antiques.

In 1915 he married Minna Dich, a goldsmith. Together they collected Chinese art and antiquities. They returned to Denmark in 1931. He donated many pieces from his art collection to the National Museum of Denmark.

Black's collection also included Chinese paper money, which appears for sale from time to time. For example, Ming notes, and in November 2017, a bundle of 50 Qing dynasty 500-cash notes from Black's collection were sold at auction in Denmark.
