= Marstal Parish =

Parish in Ærø Municipality, Denmark

Marstal Parish Marstal Sogn
- Parish
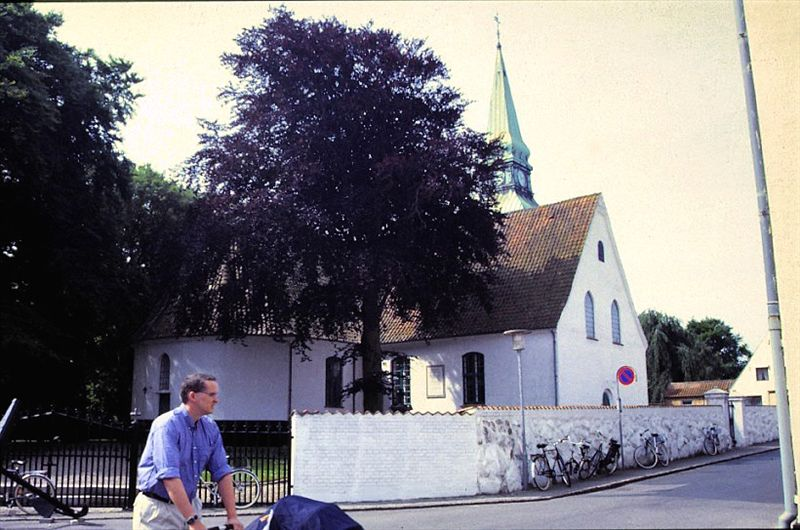
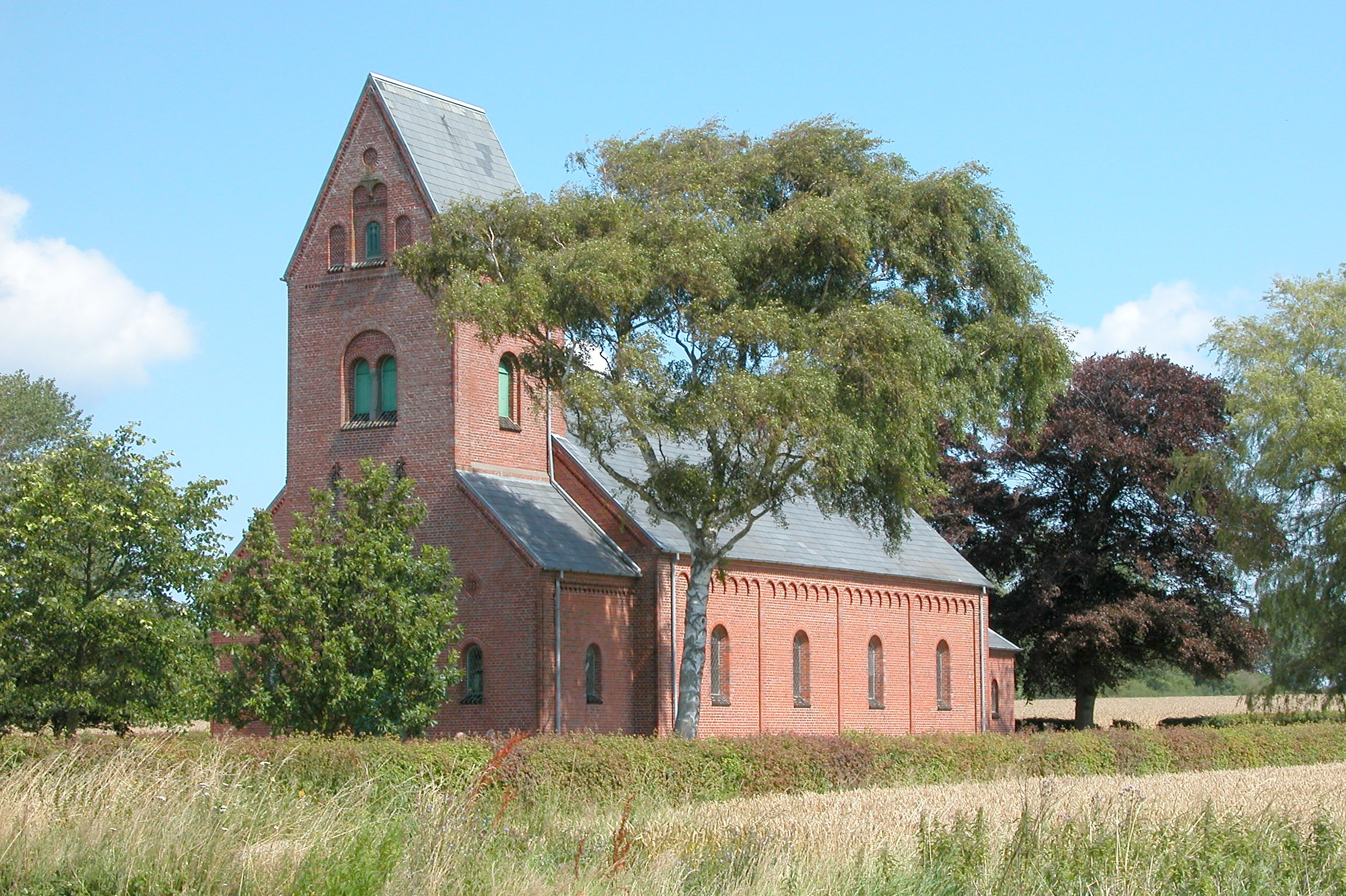
- Marstal Church (left), Ommel Church (right)

- The parish within Ærø Municipality
- Coordinates: 54.8549°N 10.5169°E
- Country: Denmark
- Region: Southern Denmark
- Municipality: Ærø Municipality
- Diocese: Funen

Population (2025)
  - Total: 2,653
- Parish number: 7714

Marstal Parish (Danish: Marstal Sogn) is a parish in the Diocese of Funen in Ærø Municipality, Denmark. The parish contains Marstal, the municipality's largest town, and Ommel, a village.
