= The Unique Boutique =

British television show

- Genre: Reality; Factual; Lifestyle
- Starring: David Hawkins; Victoria Jenkins; Natalie Lee; Triple Minor
- Narrated by: Ruth Madeley
- Country of origin: United Kingdom
- Original language: English
- No. of series: 1
- No. of episodes: 4

Production
- Running time: 45 minutes
- Production company: BBC Studios Factual Entertainment Productions

Original release
- Network: Channel 4
- Release: 24 July 2023 – present

The Unique Boutique is a British television show first broadcast on Channel 4 on 24 July 2023. The series' hosts design bespoke outfits for a variety of guests who live with various disabilities that are not served by mainstream fashion.

== Background ==
Channel 4 commissioned the series from BBC Studios Productions in June 2022, and the series entered pre-production. The show is hosted by Unique Boutique, a team of fashion experts who create bespoke outfits that fit the needs of people from varying backgrounds, including wheel chair users, plus-sized and neurodivergent individuals. The hosts include stylist Victoria, model Triple Minor, body confidence coach Natalie and stylist David, all of whom have a disability.

== Broadcast ==
The first episode aired on Channel 4 on 24 July 2023.

== Reception ==
The BBC's Hayley Campbell and Scott Bryan praised the series' empowering and respectful portrayal of people with disabilities, and its more positive and inclusive nature than older fashion series such as 10 Years Younger and Extreme Makeover.

In a review for The Guardian, Lucy Webster gave the series 4 out of 5 stars. She described it as "upbeat and colourful, just like the clothes the experts throw together, and hammers home two important, positive messages. First, that everyone – regardless of illness or disability – deserves clothes in which they look and feel fantastic. And second, that disability can be fun – a reason to experiment and try new things." Anita Singh of The Daily Telegraph gave it 3 out of 5 stars, calling it a "moving yet formulaic makeover show for all body types".
