= Raphaël Coleman =

British actor (1994–2020)

- Born: 30 September 1994; Merton, London, England
- Died: 6 February 2020 (aged 25)
- Other name: Iggy Fox
- Occupations: Actor, environmental activist
- Years active: 2000–2010 (as actor)
- Mother: Liz Jensen
- Website: iggyfox.com

Raphaël Coleman (30 September 1994 – 6 February 2020) was a British actor and environmental activist.

== Biography ==
Coleman was born in Merton, London on 30 September 1994. His mother was author Liz Jensen. His stepfather was author Carsten Jensen.

As a child, Coleman acted in several films and was best known for his role as Eric Brown in Nanny McPhee (2005). He subsequently gave up acting, worked as a wildlife biologist, took the name Iggy Fox, and became a climate change activist involved with the group Extinction Rebellion. He wrote that he became an environmental activist after seven years studying towards his M.Sc. degree in zoology.

Coleman died on 6 February 2020 at the age of 25, after collapsing while out jogging.

== Filmography ==
Year	Title	Role	Notes
2005	Nanny McPhee	Eric Brown	Film debut
2009	It's Alive	Chris Davis	
2009	The Fourth Kind	Ronnie Tyler	
2009	Edward's Turmoil	Edward	Final film, Short

== Awards and nominations ==
Year	Category	Award	Result
2007	Best Young Ensemble in a Feature Film Shared with Thomas Brodie-Sangster, Eliza Bennett, Jennifer Rae Daykin, Holly Gibbs & Samuel Honywood.	Young Artist Award	Nominated
2010	British Independent Film Festival	Best Young Actor	Won
2010	Brussels Short Film Festival	Best Male Interpretation	Won
