= Robert Rhodes (actor) =

English actor

- Born: 1993 (age 32–33); London, England
- Occupation: Actor

Robert Rhodes (born circa 1993) is an English actor. He is known for playing Jimmy Jimmy in 28 Years Later and 28 Years Later: The Bone Temple, and Silver Denys in House of the Dragon.

== Personal life ==
Rhodes was born in London, and moved to Northampton at the age of eight. He was born with a rare birthmark known as a congenital melanocytic nevus, which was removed due to fears it could turn cancerous. By the time he was seventeen, he had undergone nearly fifty surgeries, resulting in scarring around the left side of his face and hairline.

Rhodes is an ambassador for the charity Changing Faces, which advocates and supports those with visible differences. He featured prominently in their "I Am More Than Just Your Villain" campaign.

Rhodes is openly queer.

== Career ==
Rhodes decided to pursue an acting career after being cast as Link Larkin in a school production of Hairspray. After appearing in theatre roles such as Quasimodo in The Hunchback of Notre Dame, he made his screen debut in Why Didn't They Ask Evans?.

After appearing in an episode of House of the Dragon, Rhodes gained attention for his performance in 28 Years Later and, more prominently, its sequel 28 Years Later: The Bone Temple. He portrayed Jimmy Jimmy, a sadistic member of a Jimmy Savile-inspired cult.

In 2026, Rhodes guest-starred in an episode of Silent Witness, and is part of the cast for the upcoming series The Rapture, which is expected to air the same year.

== Filmography ==
=== Film ===
Acting roles

Year	Title	Role	Notes
2024	Clubhammer	The Muse	Short film
2025	28 Years Later	Jimmy Jimmy	
2025	Wasteman	Scrawny Prisoner	
2026	28 Years Later: The Bone Temple	Jimmy Jimmy	

=== Television ===
Year	Title	Role	Channel	Notes
2022	Why Didn't They Ask Evans?	Ben	BritBox	Episode 2
2024	Masters of the Air	Orderly #1	Apple TV+	3 episodes
2024	House of the Dragon	Silver Denys	HBO	Episode: "The Red Sowing"
2025	Reunion	Dexter	BBC One	Episode 1
2026	Silent Witness	Ross	BBC One	Episode: "The Enemy Within: Part 2"
2026	The Rapture	Simon 'Sonic' Keegan	BBC One	5 episodes
