= Marstal =

- Town
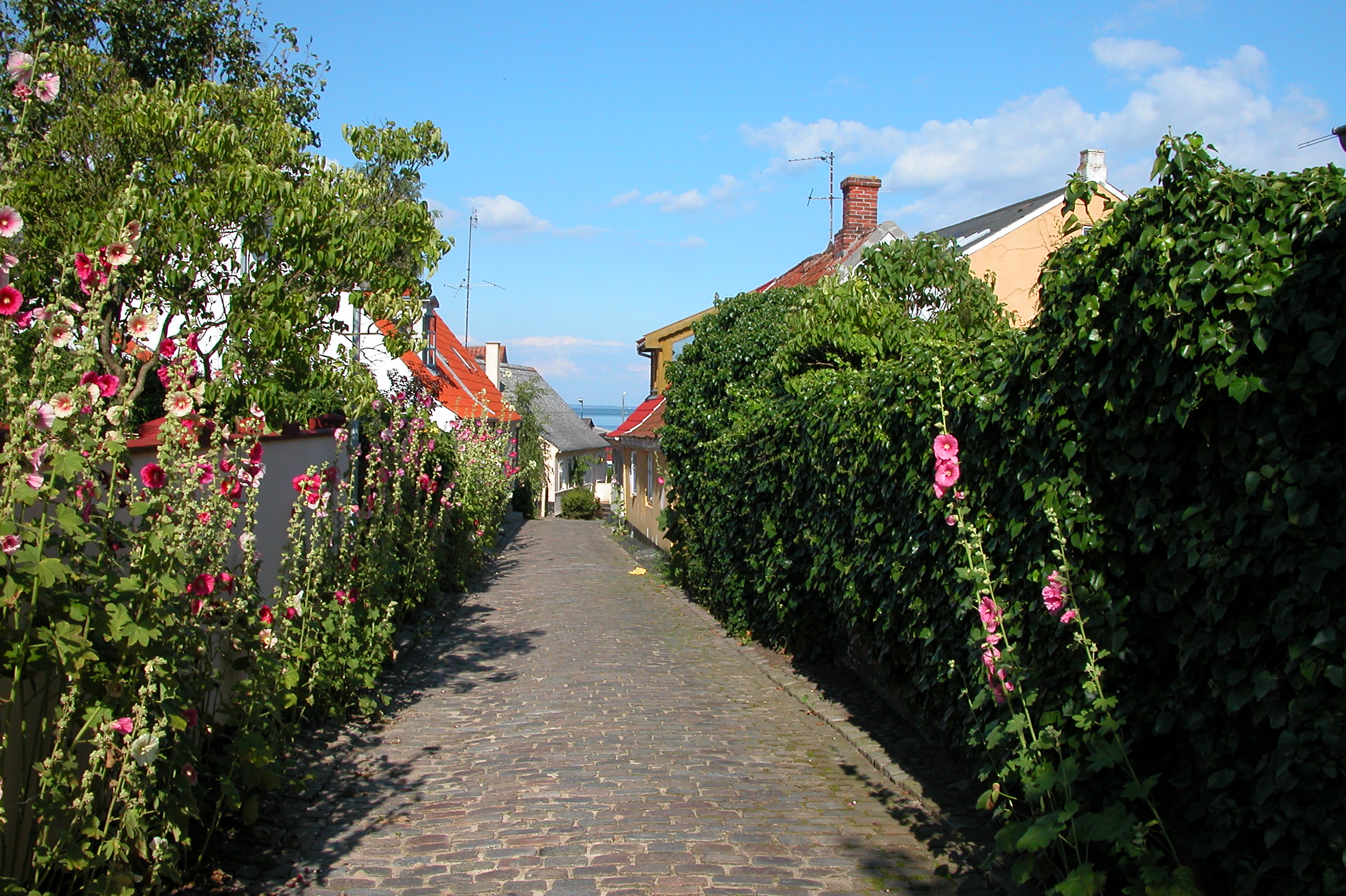
- Street in Marstal

- Location in Denmark Marstal (Region of Southern Denmark)
- Coordinates: 54°51′17″N 10°31′0″E
- Country: Denmark
- Region: Southern Denmark
- Municipality: Ærø Municipality
- Parish: Marstal Parish

Area
  - Urban: 1.42 km^{2} (0.55 sq mi)

Population (2026)
  - Urban: 1,989
  - Urban density: 1,400/km^{2} (3,630/sq mi)
- Time zone: UTC+1 (CET)
  - Summer (DST): UTC+2 (CEST)
- Postal code: DK-5960 Marstal

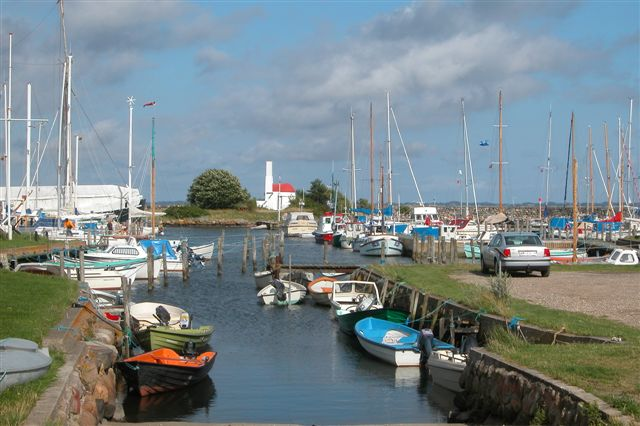
Marstal Harbour

Marstal (Danish pronunciation: [ˈmɑːstæl]) is a town in southern Denmark, located in Ærø Municipality on the island of Ærø. Marstal has a population of 1,989 (1 January 2026) and is the largest town on Ærø. It was the municipal seat of the now abolished Marstal Municipality.

Marstal has a long maritime history. For centuries Marstal vessels have sailed the seven seas, and even today the town is the home port for a considerable number of coasters. Shipping is still the nerve of the town with its dockyards, its shipping companies and its maritime school which for more than a century has trained navigators for the Danish merchant fleet.

Marstal is the economic center of Ærø and the main industries are tourism, small industry and service. The town has an international reputation for shipbuilding.

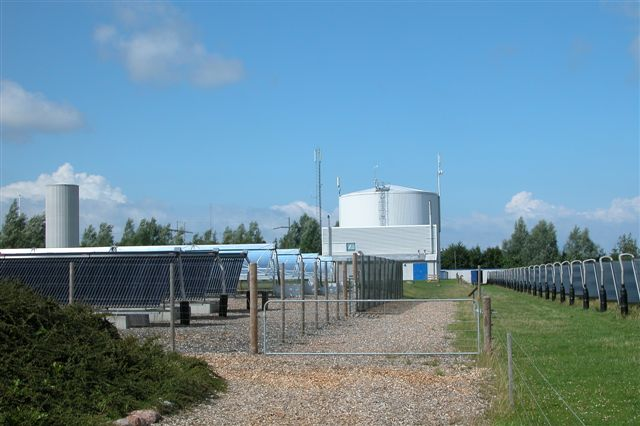
Northern Europe's largest solar heating park

Marstal is home to one of Northern Europe's largest solar power complexes, using solar power to heat water for the local District heating.

== Marstal Church ==
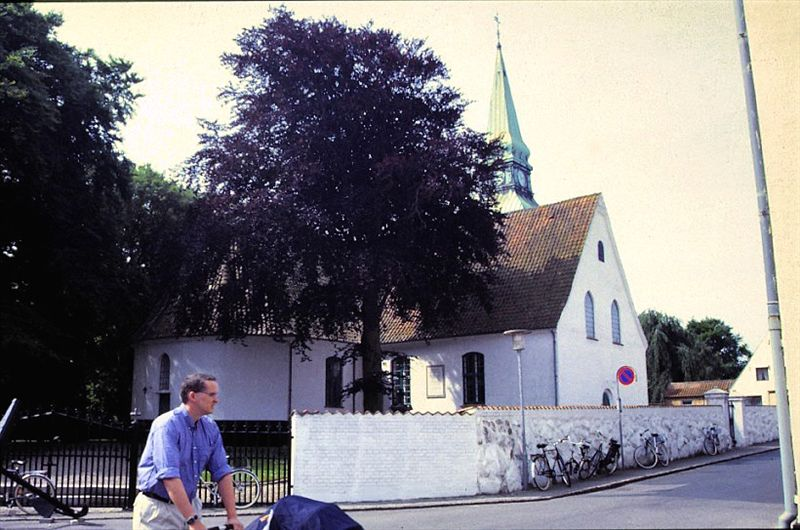
Marstal Church

Built in 1738, - once in 1772 by adding an extension and later in 1920 with a tower to commemorate the reunification of southern Jutland with Denmark. Seven votive ships indicate the growth of shipping in the town from the 18th to the 20th century. The font dates from the Middle Ages, and the blue color of the benches symbolizes the sea and eternity, whereas the red colors of the altar and pulpit evoke the blood shed by Christ. Red is also the color of love. Carl Rasmussen, a maritime artist who usually specialized in the motifs of Greenland, painted the 1881 altarpiece, depicting Christ stilling a storm. In the old churchyard are memorials and tombstones honoring the sailors of Marstal who died at sea during two world wars.

== History ==
Marstal is a shipping town founded in the 16th century. During the 17th and 18th centuries its living depended predominantly on the building and sailing of wooden ships. In the harbour is a small island Frederiksøen, which today is called the Lime Kiln (Kalkovnen). The impressive fieldstone pier at the island was built in 1825 by local seamen on a voluntary basis. The island was in use as a repair yard for ships, until in 1863 it was rented out for lime burning.

The town did not grow around a square or a church, its houses were simply erected along the paths leading upwards from the jetties. As the town grew transverse ring-roads were added, and the narrowness of the settlement often meant that the houses were placed somewhat coincidentally.

The First World War put an end to optimism and changed the glorious maritime traditions of Marstal. 42 ships from Marstal were sunk at the loss of 53 seamen. The Second World War deprived the small naval community of 80 of its young boys and seamen.

== Tourism ==
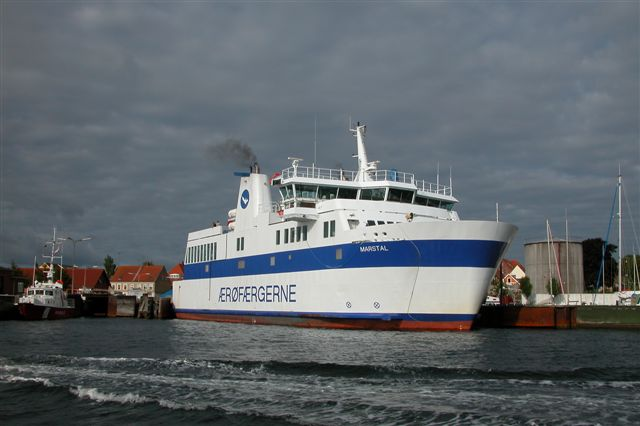

A traveler can arrive at Marstal via the ferry from Svendborg to Ærøskøbing and then driving from there. A ferry also exists from Fåborg to Søby on Northern Ærø.

The camping site, the youth hostel, and hotels provide accommodation for the many visitors.

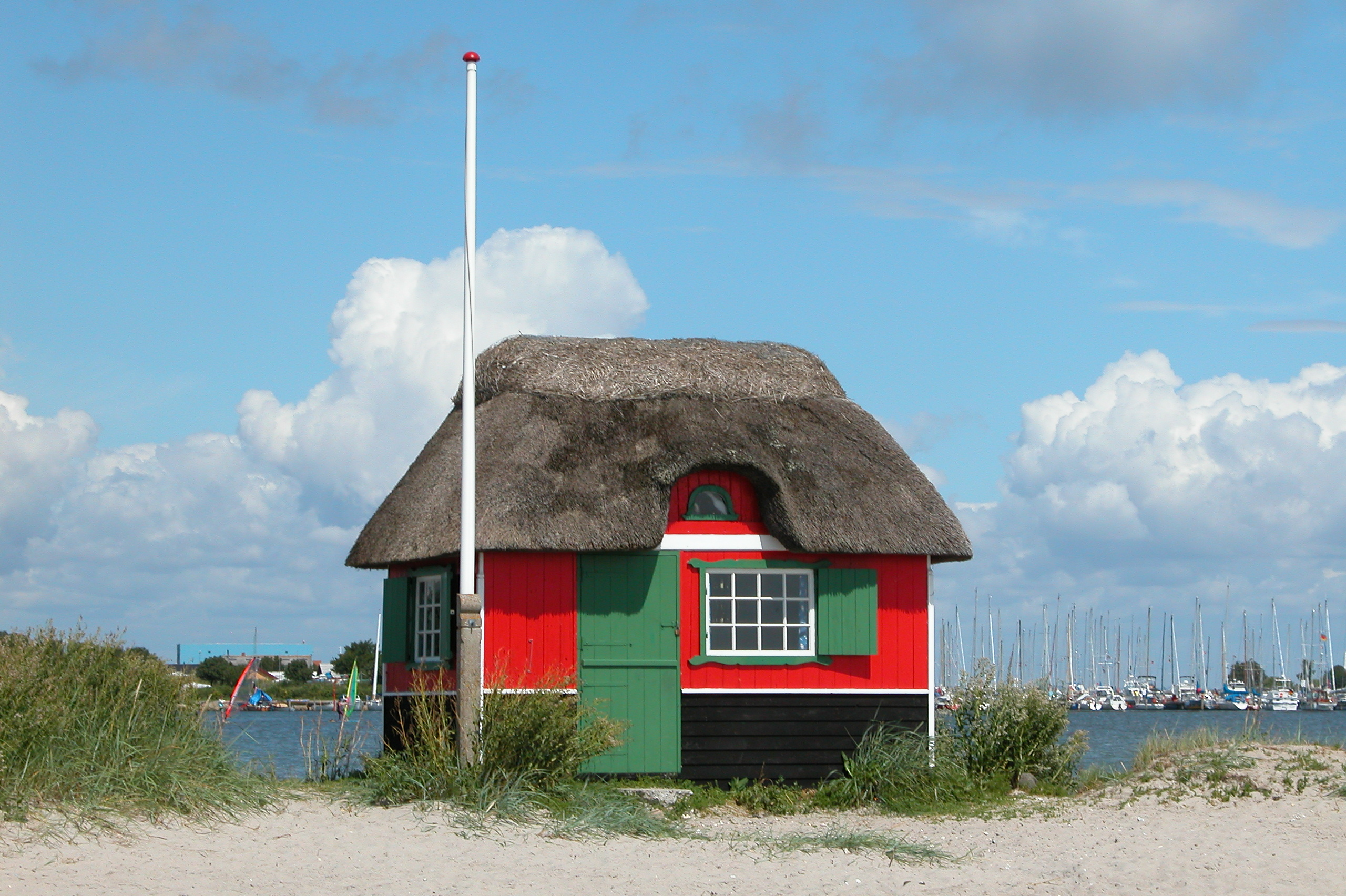
Beach hut on Eriks Hale

Eriks Hale, a strip that jots into the sea south of the town, is home to a beach often used for swimming and bathing.

== Twin towns ==
Marstal is twinned with:

Eksjö, Jönköping County, Sweden	Elsfleth, Lower Saxony, Germany.

== Notable people ==
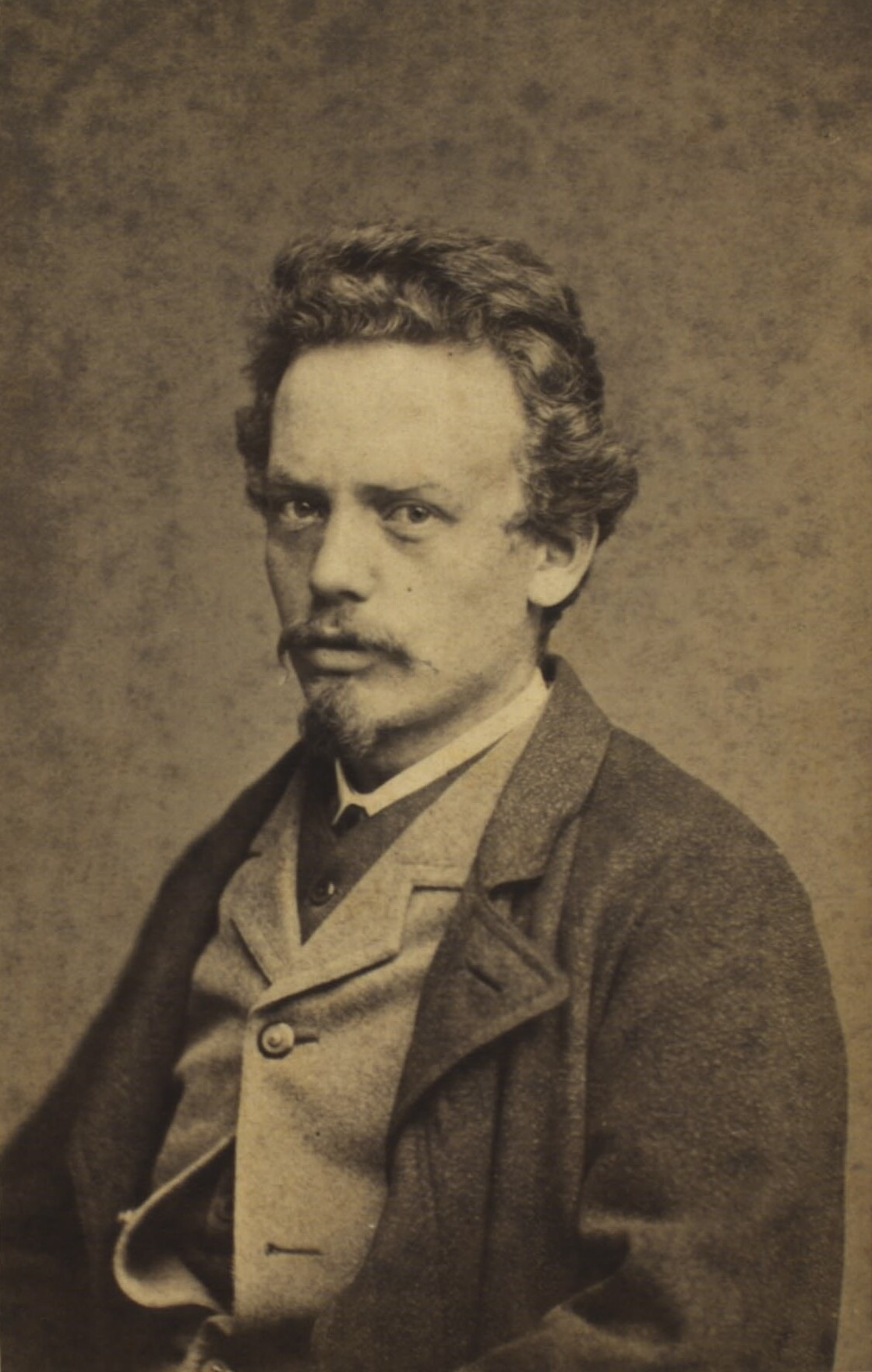
Jens Erik Carl Rasmussen, 1869

- Carl Rasmussen (1841–1893) a Danish painter, in 1880, he married, bought a home and establish a studio in Marstal on Ærø
- Sophus Black (1882 in Marstal – 1960) a Danish telegraph manager and art collector
- Hermann Møller Boye (1913 in Marstal – 1944) a member of the Danish resistance executed by the German occupying power
- Erik Kromann (born 1946 in Marstal) a Danish author, museums director, head of the Marstal Maritime Museum
- Carsten Jensen (born in 1952 in Marstal) author and political columnist, his 2006 epic novel We, the Drowned is set in Marstal.
- Jesper Lange (born 1986 in Marstal) a Danish football player, about 300 club caps, currently playing for Esbjerg fB
