= Liz Jensen =

British author (born 1959)

- Born: 1959 (age 66–67); Oxfordshire, England
- Education: Somerville College, Oxford
- Occupations: Novelist, translator, activist
- Spouse: Carsten Jensen
- Children: 2, including Raphaël Coleman
- Writing career
- Pen name: Emma Ryder
- Genres: Black comedy, science fiction, satire, family drama, historical fantasy, psychological suspense

Liz Jensen (born 1959) is an English novelist living in Copenhagen, Denmark.

== Biography ==
Liz Jensen was born in Oxfordshire, the daughter of a Danish father and a mother whose family were Moroccan Jews. She studied English at Somerville College, Oxford.

She first worked as a print and radio journalist in Hong Kong and Taiwan. She then spent four years as a sculptor, translator and freelance writer in France, where she wrote her first novel, Egg Dancing (1995). She then returned to London to write Ark Baby (1998), The Paper Eater (2000), and War Crimes for the Home (2002). While living in the UK, Jensen also spent ten years working as a television and radio producer for the BBC.

She was elected a Fellow of the Royal Society of Literature in 2005. She is also a founder member of Extinction Rebellion's Writers Rebel.

Her fifth novel was adapted into a film version, The 9th Life of Louis Drax, by Alexandre Aja in 2016. Her 2009 novel, The Rapture, was adapted into a five-part BBC One drama series starring Ruth Madeley.

== Personal life ==
Jensen is married to the Danish writer Carsten Jensen, author of the critically-acclaimed novel We, the Drowned, which she co-translated into English as Emma Ryder. Her younger son by her first marriage, Raphaël Coleman, a child actor-turned-climate change activist, died from an undiagnosed heart condition at the age of 25 in 2020.

== Novels ==
Jensen talks about her 2009 novel The Rapture on Bookbits radio.

- Egg Dancing (1995)
- Ark Baby (1998)
- The Paper Eater (2000)
- War Crimes for the Home (2002)
- The Ninth Life of Louis Drax (2004)
- My Dirty Little Book of Stolen Time (2006)
- The Rapture (2009)
- The Uninvited (2012)

Non-fiction

- Your Wild and Precious Life: On Grief, Hope and Rebellion (Canongate, 2024)
