= Rights Now =

British disability umbrella group

Rights Now, sometimes written with an exclamation mark, was a British umbrella group of disabled people's organisations and charities which campaigned for a change in the law to prevent discrimination against disabled people and for a full civil rights law, even though the result was the flawed Disability Discrimination Act 1995. The biggest protest in numbers of people was in July 1994 at Trafalgar Square and Whitehall, London. It was a very broad-based campaign, including trade unions for example. Campaigning to improve the laws for full civil rights continued, but Rights Now as a group ended in 1995.

== Prior to Rights Now ==
=== Silver Jubilee Access Committee (SJAC) ===
The Silver Jubilee Committee on Improving Access for Disabled People was established in 1977 by Alf Morris MP, the Minister for Disabled People, to report on access arrangements regarding the Silver Jubilee celebrations. He appointed Peter Large (Spinal Injuries Association, SIA) as its chair. It produced a report in 1979, Can Disabled People Go Where You Go?

=== Committee on Restrictions Against Disabled People (CORAD) ===
In 1979 Alf Morris established the Committee on Restrictions Against Disabled People, CORAD. He again asked Peter Large to be the chair. Colin Barnes identified the creation of CORAD as the start of the UK movement for disabled people's civil rights because CORAD, building on the work of the SJAC, analysed the restrictions against disabled people systematically, including education and employment. Its terms of reference, membership, and some meeting minutes are held in the UK National Archives. Shortly after CORAD was established there was a general election and a Conservative government replaced the Labour government, so the committee reported to the new minister, Hugh Rossi MP, who reportedly ignored their findings. In written evidence submitted to Parliament in 2004, Peter Large recalled the following:

"Lord Morris asked me to chair a successor committee, the Committee on Restrictions Against Disabled People (CORAD) 'to consider the architectural and social barriers which may result in discrimination against disabled people and prevent them from making full use of facilities available to the general public; and to make recommendations.' CORAD reported in February 1982. It recommended anti-discrimination legislation covering employment, education, the provision of goods, facilities and services, insurance, transport, property rights, occupational pension schemes, membership of associations and clubs, and civic duties and functions. CORAD also recommended a regulatory body or Commission with powers to investigate, conciliate and if necessary take legal action on individual complaints."

=== First of many non-government bills ===
In 1983 Jack Ashley MP used the ten-minute rule and put forward the Civil Rights (Disabled Persons) Bill which would have established a commission with legal powers of enforcement. The Bill did not have government support and was lost. Various research writings claim or estimate the number of attempts to pass a civil rights bill for disabled people between 1980 and 1995, with numbers varying between nine and sixteen bills.

=== Voluntary Organisations for Anti-Discrimination Legislation (VOADL) ===
Around 1985 a group of the large, national charities for disabled people, including RADAR (the Royal Association for Disability and Rehabilitation, as was), the Spastics Society (as was), came together to form a lobby group for anti-discrimination legislation, ADL, also known as civil rights for disabled people. The British Council of Organisations of Disabled People, BCODP (as was), around 1988 agreed to participate in VOADL as an observer organisation.

VOADL established an advisory committee around 1989 which was chaired by Mike Oliver who supported Colin Barnes as the researcher formally linked to BCODP. Research interviews were held at the SIA offices led by Colin Barnes, Stephen Bradshaw, Jane Campbell, and Mike Oliver. In 1991 the results of this research was published as a definitive text on ADL in the UK.

The closest successor organisation to VOADL would probably be the Voluntary Organisations Disability Group (VODG): "a membership body representing organisations within the voluntary sector who work alongside disabled people."

== Rights Now, 1992–1995 ==
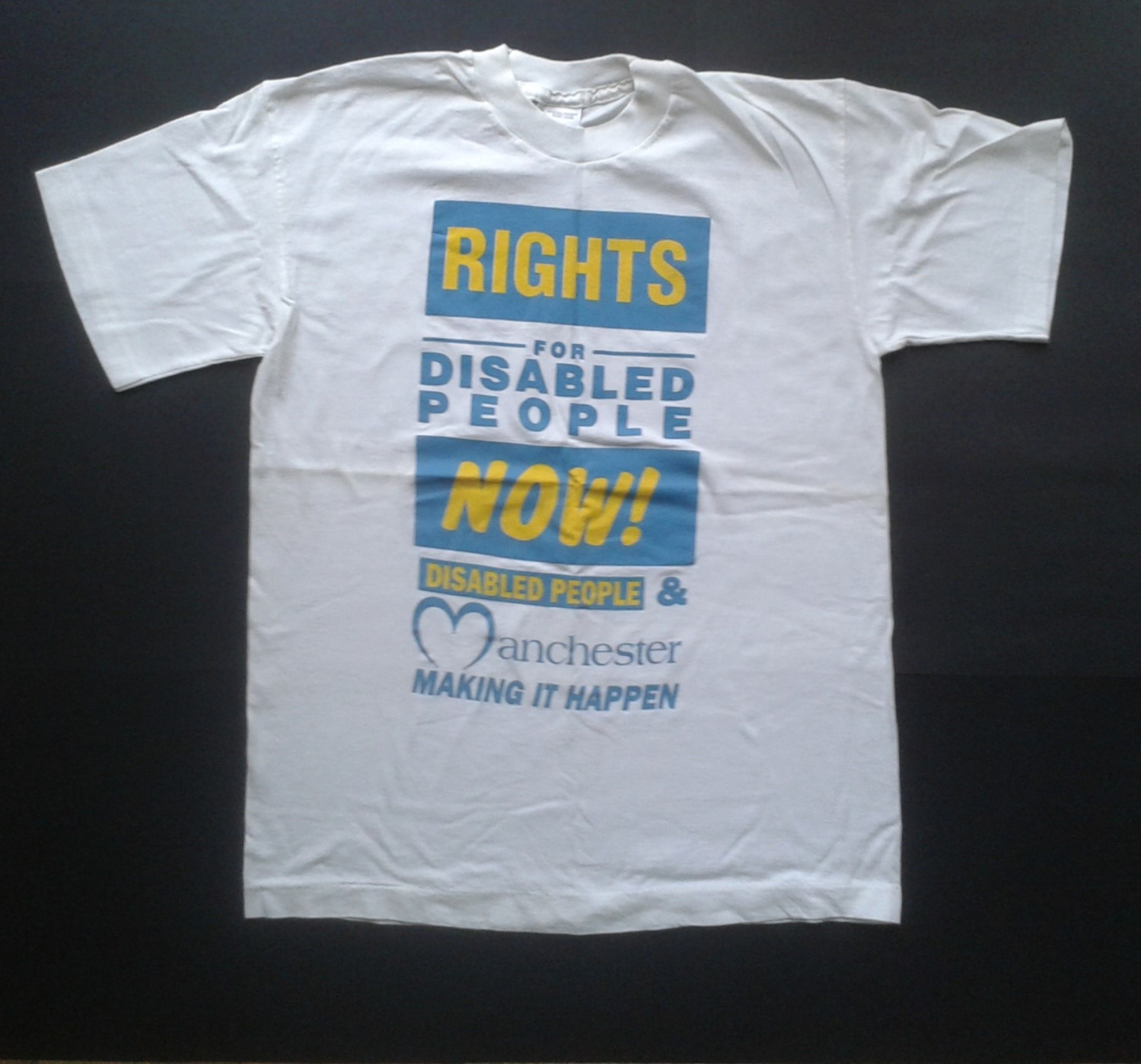
A Rights Now t-shirt (source: Lorraine Gradwell Collection, Disabled People's Archive, Manchester)

The Rights Now group was formed in 1992. Although VOADL had been successful in pulling together a number of the largest disability charities ("organisations for") they had found that disabled people's organisations ("organisations of") were distrustful and reluctant to join and share their knowledge and strategies. This changed when the creation of a new, combined organisation was suggested by the executive committee of BCODP and the charities involved in VOADL agreed to the 'merger'. Rights Now had a reported 83 member organisations, including trade unions as well as disabled people's organisations (DPOs) and disability charities, and a reported 10,000 individual members. Only disabled people who were representing a DPO could be an office-holder of Rights Now.

The first Chair of Rights Now was Stephen Bradshaw, chief executive of the Spinal Injuries Association, followed by Rachel Hurst. The campaign reportedly had strong links with Parliamentarians though the All-Party Disability Group and its researcher Victoria Scott, who worked for RADAR, and the Rights Now Coordinator, Adam Thomas.

In parallel, around the same time many disabled people and their organisations were becoming more vocally critical of charities and fundraising, and in particular, on the biennial Telethons run by ITV. A protest demo of around 200 disabled people outside Telethon 90 was organised by the Campaign to Stop Patronage with Victoria Waddington and Allan Sutherland doing the press liaison.

The 1990 demo created the conditions for a larger-scale protest demo by more than one thousand disabled people outside (and some inside) Telethon 92. The organisational work for these demos had a background in the emerging disability arts scene rather than in elected politics, committees and lobbying, and it led to the creation of the Disabled People's Direct Action Network, DAN, in early 1993. While DAN was more focused on inaccessible transport rather than civil rights laws in Parliament, nevertheless their highly visible protests on the streets across England and Wales caused a "media extravaganza" according to John Evans, saying also that it "no doubt highlighted the profile of the need for civil rights legislation".

=== 1993 ===
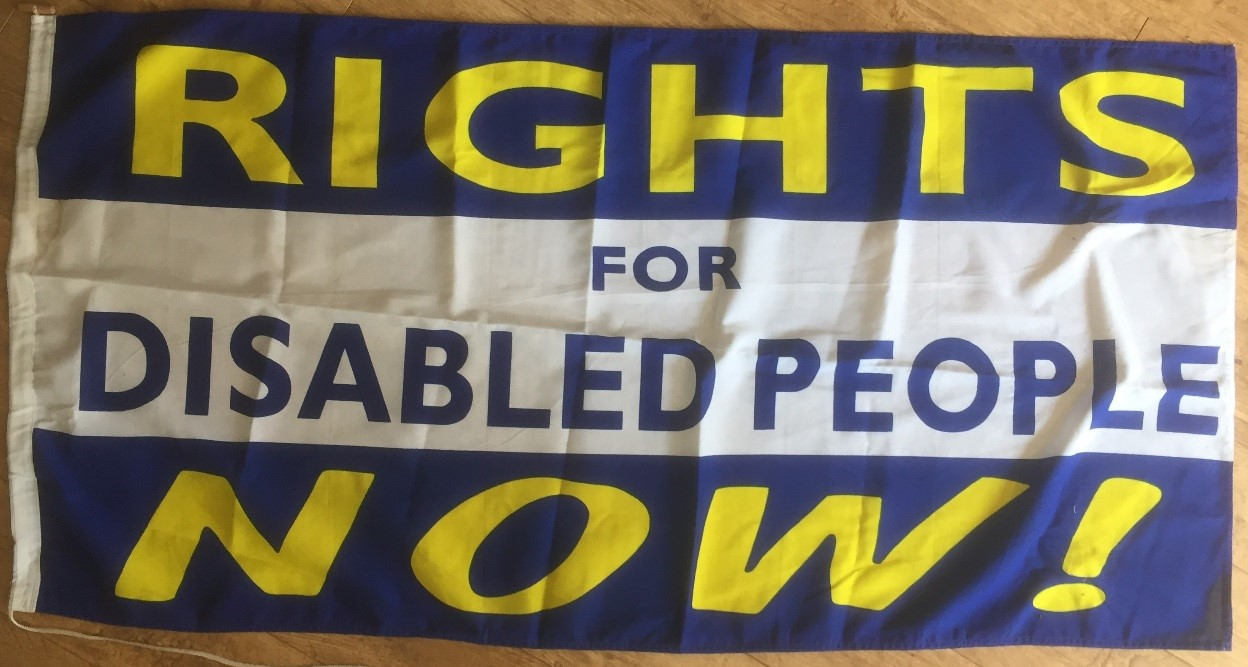
A Rights Now flag (source: Rachel Hurst Collection, Disabled People's Archive, Manchester)

Although DAN was very focused on street campaigning against inaccessible public transport (mass transit), nevertheless its first major action was during the by-election in Christchurch, Dorset, in 1993 where Rob Hayward, the Conservative candidate, had previously been an MP for another area and had 'talked out' a bill for disabled people's civil rights. He failed to win this safe seat.

In July 1993, Rights Now published What Price Civil Rights?, a report that provided "substantial evidence that the government [had] grossly overestimated the cost of implementing the Civil Rights Bill", the government figure being £17 billion. The Rights Now report estimated the cost as no more than £5 billion.

=== 1994 ===
In the 1993/1994 parliamentary session Roger Berry MP won a place in the ballot for a private members bill, and for at least the ninth time since Jack Ashley MP, a Civil Rights (Disabled Persons) Bill was put forward to become a law. The wording had evolved over the years, this version having been updated by the disabled lawyers Caroline Gooding and David Ruebain. A national political scandal emerged when it was revealed on 6 May 1994 that the Minister for Disabled People, Nicholas Scott MP (and father of Victoria Scott, who was a strong supporter of Rights Now, causing much press comment), had arranged for over 80 wrecking amendments to be put by five backbench MPs who were hostile to the bill, while he maintained he was "neutral" on the matter; a miss-statement which caused him to have to be replaced soon afterwards by William Hague MP as the Minister for Disabled People.

On 23 May 1994 "a group of disabled activists abandoned their wheelchairs and crawled into the House of Commons in an attempt to lobby their MPs. They were turned away at the normal public entrance - which is inaccessible to wheelchair users - and it took five hours before they were allowed into the parliamentary lobby."

Perhaps the largest attended protest Rights Now organised was on 9 July 1994 in Trafalgar Square and Whitehall, London, with an estimated 2,800 people protesting. DAN took part in the protest with their own action, delivering a giant 'letter' to 10 Downing Street for then-Prime Minister John Major MP.

=== 1995 ===
Following the failure of the Roger Berry bill, the next iteration for civil rights was the Harry Barnes bill. A report by the House of Commons Library on this bill, written by staff with no political axe to grind, stated, "The Bill has the overwhelming support of disability groups, who have been campaigning for 10-15 years to establish some form of anti-discrimination legislation."

In an unusual move in Parliament, the government introduced its own bill - to become the DDA - to be debated in parallel with the Barnes bill. A report by the House of Commons Library on the DDA, while it was still a bill, stated,

"there appears to be unanimous agreement among disability groups on the main ways in which it falls short of the sort of legislation that they desire. There is also general support for the Private Member's Bill introduced by Harry Barnes ... The main objections to the Government's Bill are that:

- the National Disability Council (NDC) will not be powerful enough;
- the definition of disability is too narrow;
- the scope of the Government's Bill is too limited;
- there are too many "get-out" provisions.

Disability groups object to the fact that the NDC will not have the same sort of enforcement powers that the Commission for Racial Equality or the Equal Opportunities Commission have".

Rights Now is explicitly referenced in this report as one of the 'disability groups' holding these views.

The Disability Discrimination Act 1995 became law; the Barnes Bill failed.

== Criticisms and legacy ==
In the November 1994 edition of the Coalition magazine produced by the Greater Manchester Coalition of Disabled People concentrated on the campaign for civil rights in the wake of the Berry bill. An editorial article by Ian Stanton included the following concerns:

"To many of us in the disabled people's movement, it is galling to hear RADAR making pronouncements upon the importance of civil rights. We remember that less than ten years ago RADAR was echoing the government's line that "education and persuasion" would provide equality for disabled people. ... We now claim to be so close to achieving recognition of our rights; but am I alone in worrying about how easily our issues can be hi-jacked by non-representative groups, and how quickly our voices can be drowned out by those of non-disabled people? The disabled people's movement has become formidable campaigning machine, but sometimes we can be politically naive, particularly when compared with the slick lobbying skills and access to the 'old boys network' associated with the major charities."

Probably one legacy - other than the new law - was in the changes that took place in some of the major national charities for disabled people (disability organisations) where they started to address the concerns expressed by organisations of disabled people (disabled people's organisations). Examples of these changes included: employing more disabled people on their staff, involving disabled people more in their publicity plans, and by having more disabled people on their governing bodies controlling the charities. Nevertheless, some significant gaps were said to remain, not least in unequal access to funding. Others took a different view, for example Bob Williams Findlay in 2015 wrote,

To fully appreciate our position on the DDA it is necessary to strip away the sugar-coated presentation of this historic piece of legislation in order to reveal how the collective voice of disabled people and their many allies were silenced by acts of betrayal and brute force. The real story isn't really about the twenty years since the passing of this piecemeal, ineffectual and oppressive Act, but rather it is about how the Civil Rights Bill and the ideas contained within it were buried both physically and politically by those who felt threatened by the potential impact it would've had on society.
