= Erik Kromann =

Danish author (born 1946)

Erik Kromann (born 1946) is a Danish author, museums director for Marstal Maritime Museum since 1980 and a local politician. Kromann has also assisted in many TV broadcasts and TV shows about maritime history. He was born in the town of Marstal, on Ærø.
