= Disabled People's Direct Action Network =

British disability rights activist organisation

The Disabled People's Direct Action Network (DAN) is a disability rights activist organisation in England and Wales that campaigned for civil rights with high-profile street demonstrations involving civil disobedience, rallies and protests.

== Prior campaigns ==
In 1989 the Derbyshire Direct Action Now Network (DDANN) was formed by local disabled people to protest against the pedestrianisation of Chesterfield. These protests resulted in police arrests and court hearings, where disabled people refused to plead guilty, all reading out the same defence to the court. One of the DDANN protesters was Alan Holdsworth, employed by the Derbyshire Coalition of Disabled People (DCDP) as a community link worker, along with many DCDP members including Ken Davis.

Between 1990 and 1993 the London-based Campaign for Accessible Transport (CAT) held street demonstrations including Oxford Street. Its organisers included Ruth Bashall, Kate Brown, Tracey Proudlock, Sue Elsegood, Victoria Waddington and Allan Sutherland as the press officer. [source: GMCDP archive, Manchester]

On 8 September 1991 in south Manchester there was a weekend workshop to learn from similar street protests in the USA. The workshop was led by visiting activists Mike Auberger and Babs Johnson from ADAPT, and it finished with the practical learning of going out and blocking three buses on the main road nearby. This was during the 10th annual general meeting of BCODP, held at Owens Park, on Wilmslow Road in Manchester. A photograph of this protest was used on the front cover of a book on images of disabled people.

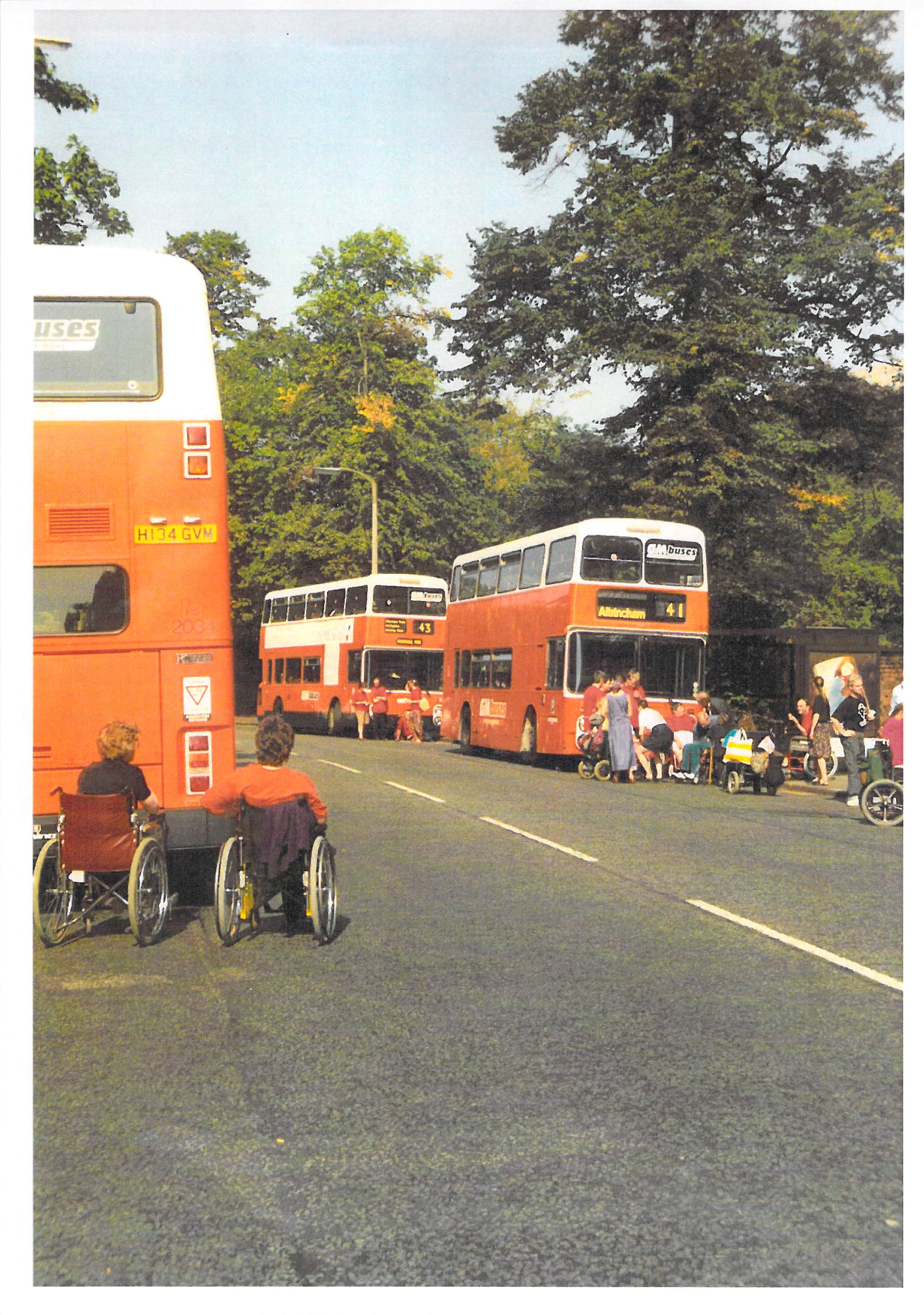
Disabled people campaigning against inaccessible buses, Manchester, 1991.

On 22 November 1991 in Leeds a protest by 150 disabled people and allies outside the BBC studios picketed the Children in Need live broadcasting under the banner of Rights Not Charity Group. Eight people were arrested, four were disabled people.

On 18 July 1992 in London, over a thousand disabled people held a protest outside the ITV studios (London Weekend TV) picketing the Telethon live broadcasting under the banner of Block Telethon. ITV later abandoned the Telethon approach. The main organisers were Barbara Lisicki and Alan Holdsworth, who had organised a smaller, similar protest against the Telethon broadcast in 1990 and had done further development work preparing for the 1992 protest.

== Structure and Methods ==
DAN was a network of individual disabled people and allies. The network maintained coverage across the UK through a team of regional organisers.

A national committee of disabled people existed for most of DAN's active years, including many of the regional organisers. A newsletter was produced, especially in the build-up and winding-down from a major action.

== Early years ==
In early 1993, Barbara Lisicki, Alan Holdsworth, and Sue Elsegood became founders of the Disabled People's Direct Action Network (DAN).

The idea was to build on and sustain the campaigning energy from the Block Telethon protest organised by the Campaign to Stop Patronage, and in spring 1993 a weekend residential conference was held by about 16 interested disabled people using the guest rooms in the grounds of the Disabled Drivers Association at Ashwellthorpe Hall near Norwich. The debate was essentially between creating a general civil rights campaign or creating a campaign based on specific target issues, starting with inaccessible public transport. The eventual vote was in favour of specific targets, the argument being that it would visibly engage more disabled people. At this weekend DAN was formally created.

The first public action by DAN was in July 1993 in Christchurch after a Parliamentary by-election was called, and the Conservative candidate, tipped to win, had previously in the House of Commons prevented new disability rights legislation from becoming law. DAN organised protests during his campaign, and he lost the election. The Campaign for Accessible Transport – led by disability rights groups – was set up to protest and lobby for increased access to public transport.

Between 1993 and 1998, DAN held more than 100 actions, and held 16 national actions between its founding and 2002. Typically a local action took place on a single day, whereas national actions developed into three-day long events, usually from Friday to Sunday.

DAN protesters blocked buses on Oxford Street, Trafalgar Square and other locations across London by handcuffing or chaining themselves to buses, as well as placing themselves in the path of buses and refusing to move. On several occasions in 1994 and 1995, during the consideration of the Disability Discrimination Act, protesters handcuffed themselves to a Routemaster bus by Palace of Westminster. Other protest locations included the Nottinghamshire constituency office of Chancellor Kenneth Clarke, Harrods, and the Tate Gallery.

== Disability Discrimination Act 1995 and Rights Now! ==
After many attempts in Parliament to pass a civil rights law for disabled people (also called, anti-discrimination legislation) a law was finally passed in 1995 - the Disability Discrimination Act, or DDA. The official position of DAN was that the DDA had too many loopholes - it was too weak. For example, despite the DDA being strengthened in 2003 to include public transport for the first time, Andy Gill was quoted in a BBC website news article saying, "We did not support the Disability Discrimination Act from the word go because it is not addressing the real concerns of what disabled people need. We need legislation to ensure that all disabled people have the right to live as full participants in society."

Many of the street protests in 1994 and 1995 leading up to the new law being passed were organised by the disability campaign, Rights Now!, although many DAN members also took part in these protests as well as DAN protests.

The Christchurch protest was the first national action, followed by Trafalgar Square, Westminster Central Hall, Leeds (all 1994), Cardiff, Birmingham (1995), Nottingham, Derby (1996), London, Bristol (1997), London, Newcastle, Hull (1998), Bournemouth, London (1999, 2001 and 2002).

== Post 1995 actions and legacy ==
In the UK in May 1997 there was a change of government with the Labour party winning and with Tony Blair MP as the new Prime Minister. However, many disabled people had misgivings about the unclear proposals coming from the New Labour government ministers on what was called by some, welfare reform, and called cuts by others. On 22 December 1997 DAN and other organisations had organised a one-day protest against these forthcoming cuts, held in Trafalgar Square. A group of "Danners" broke away from this rally and headed down Whitehall towards the gates of Downing Street. They had red paint hidden inside paper coffee cups, and throwing the paint on themselves they protested on the floor in front of the gates for the TV news crews that were stationed there for any sudden political news reasons. The protest was named after one of the banners, "Blair's Blood". As well as being shown on UK national news, the protest details and images went around the world, including the front page of the New York Times. Although there were cuts in welfare benefits for disabled people, and especially after 2010 and the austerity programme started by the Coalition government, it can be argued that the 1997 protest at least paused these cuts for some years.

On 20 November 2001, supported by DAN in the UK and disabled people's campaigns across all the European Union countries, and coordinated by the European Disability Forum and the Buses for All campaign, all new buses to be used anywhere in the EU had to be fully accessible by EU law, with a timetable to phase out the old, inaccessible buses. Double deckers were the last bus type to become fully accessible. This was done using the EU's single market powers.

The number of DAN actions recorded following 2002 significantly decreases, though there are recorded actions up until 2022.

Disabled People Against Cuts, DPAC was founded in 2010, using similar tactics and campaigning on similar issues.

== Television ==
In 1995 the TV documentary Desperate DAN, produced by Rave Productions Ltd, was broadcast as part of the Over the Edge series of BBC disability programming. It focused on national actions by DAN members in London, (targeting Westminster Bridge and Parliament) and Cardiff (targeting the main bus and train termini). The BBC2 programme was also broadcast in Europe and worldwide on the British Forces Broadcasting Service (BFBS).

On 19 May 2020 the BBC announced it had commissioned Dragonfly Film and TV Productions and One Shoe Productions to make a dramatised account of aspects of DAN for future broadcasting on BBC2 TV channel in the UK. The basis of the programme centres on two DAN members and on the political debates within the disabled people's movement leading up to the passing of the Disability Discrimination Act in 1995, regarded by many disabled people as a compromised and inadequate law for their civil rights. The programme marks the 25th anniversary of the creation of that law (which was later absorbed into the Equality Act 2010). The film was made as Then Barbara Met Alan and was broadcast on 21 March 2022.

== See also ==
- Accessibility of transport in London
