= Ruth Bashall =

British disability rights activist and feminist (1952–2023)

- Born: Ruth Parsons; 23 May 1952; Bromsgrove, England
- Died: 11 November 2023 (aged 71); London, UK
- Education: London School of Economics
- Spouse: Alan Bashall (m. 1971. div. 1977)
- Children: 1

Ruth Bashall (23 May 1952 – 11 November 2023) was an activist for lesbian and disability rights. She co-founded Stay Safe East, an organisation that supports disabled survivors of abuse, in 2010.

== Personal life and education ==
Bashall was born to Bill Parsons, an economist, and Joan, a translator and English teacher. The family moved to Paris in 1954, where Bashall learned French at Lycée Blaise Pascal. She returned to the UK in 1970 to study sociology at the London School of Economics, graduating with a BSc in 1975. She married Alan Bashall in 1971, they had a daughter the following year. They divorced in 1977.

== Employment ==
Bashall worked as a bus conductor from 1977 to 1981, then at a community bookshop from 1981 to 1984. She was a transport researcher for the Campaign to Improve London’s Transport (CILT) from 1984 to 1990. She was a local council access worker for the London Borough of Waltham Forest from 1990 to 1996, and a policy officer from 1996 to 1999. In 1999 she became an independent disability equality trainer and consultant. From 2007 to 2017 she advised the Metropolitan Police and Greater London Authority on domestic and sexual violence and disability hate crime.

== Activism ==
=== Lesbian and women’s rights ===
Bashall came out as lesbian in the mid-1970s. At around the same time she helped to establish the Lesbian Mothers’ Group, a group dedicated to winning lesbians the right to keep their children after separating from their male partners. She also joined the London Lesbian Line collective and was a member of the disabled gay rights group, Regard. With Hillary Torrence she co-organised Women for Improved Transport (WTI) in 1984, with the objective of calling “attention to the needs of all women using London Transport, with particular regard to matters of safety and access.”

=== Disability rights ===
Bashell became a wheelchair user and experienced “numerous incidents of disability-targeted hostility on the buses”, including a driver who refused to come close enough to the kerb for her to board, saying “she shouldn’t be out at that time of night” (it was 10pm on a weekday). In 1989 she co-founded Campaign for Accessible Transport (CAT). She was one of the “Oxford Street 16”, who were arrested after direct action by CAT and held in a police cell “while the police hunted out a means of getting 16 disabled people to an inaccessible court.”

She set up Stay Safe East with Nicholas Russell in 2010, the “first disabled people’s organisation dedicated to tackling violence and abuse against disabled people from diverse communities”. She was initially the charity's CEO, and later became its policy and projects advisor. She retired from this role a few days before she died.

Bashall was:

- an active member of the Disabled People’s Direct Action Network (DAN).
- a member of Greater London Action on Disability, the Greater London Association of Disabled People (GLAD) and chair of Disability Action in Waltham Forest, where she helped set up Stay Safe East which worked on “violence against women and institutional violence against disabled people.
- a researcher for the Centre for Independent Transport Research (CILT).
- member of Frida Network, a “disabled women’s sexual health project.”
- an advisor to Transport for London (TFL) and during an interview on Channel 4 in May 2012 said “I’m worried – and so are TFL” regarding the lack of accessible public transport for the 2012 London Olympics.

In the early 2000s, she set up and, with Anne Novis, co-chaired the Metropolitan police's Disability Independent Advisory Group (DIAG).

== Publications ==
- The Crisis of London ed. Andy Thornley (1992) Pub. Routledge – contributor
- Working with Disabled People: for Inclusive Access with Ossie Stuart and Danny Puresh (2004) Pub. Greater London Authority - author
- Disabled Women and Domestic Violence: Responding to the Experiences of Survivors with Ravi K Thiara, Gill Hague and Brenda Ellis (2011) Pub. Jessica Kingsley - author

== See also ==
- Stay Safe East website
- 2014 interview with Ruth Bashall “Feminism, Disability and Activism 7”
- 2014 interview with Ruth Bashall “Feminism, Disability and Activism 8”
