= Barbara Lisicki =

British disability rights activist, comedian, and equality trainer

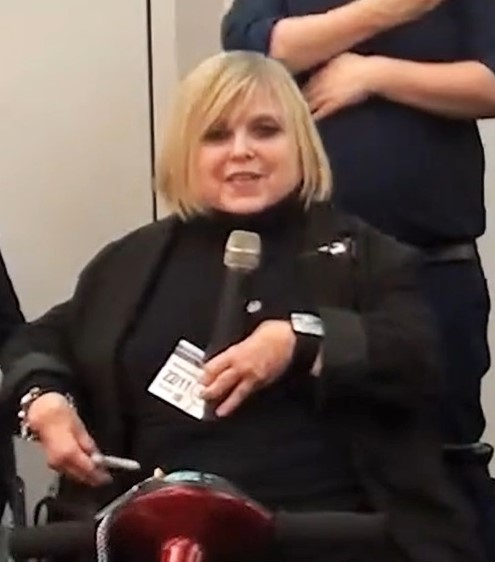
- Lisicki speaks at UK Disability History Month in 2017
- Other name: Wanda Barbara (stage name)
- Occupations: Activist, comedian, equality trainer
- Years active: 1988-present
- Known for: Disability rights activism
- Notable work: Disabled People's Direct Action Network

Barbara Lisicki is a British disability rights activist, comedian, and equality trainer. She is a founder of the Disabled People's Direct Action Network (DAN), an organization that engaged in nonviolent civil disobedience to raise awareness and to advocate for the rights of disabled people. She is a featured subject of the 2022 BBC docudrama Then Barbara Met Alan, and appeared in The Disabled Century on BBC2 in 1999.

== Early life and education ==
Lisicki was raised in North London with her siblings by her mother. She has said she was expelled from a school that "was a convent run by nuns. I was rejecting the mindless discipline and religious zealotry." Lisicki began showing signs of Still's disease around age 14, and spent more than a year in a specialty hospital using a wheelchair. According to Lisicki, "we used to dump the wheelchairs in the bushes and hitchhike to the pub [...] They'd be sending out search parties and we'd be down there having a vodka and lime. I was 16." She graduated from university and completed a postgraduate teaching programme, but was unsuccessful in finding work as a teacher.

== Career ==
In 1988, Lisicki began her comedy career in London, performing stand-up in a cabaret. She has been described as "the first British disabled stand-up comedian". In 1989, she met Alan Holdsworth when they were both performers in the Disability Arts Cabaret. She co-founded the Tragic But Brave group with Holdsworth and Ian Stanton in the late 1980s, and they toured for years in the UK, Europe, and the United States. Holdsworth performed music under the stage name Johnny Crescendo, and she performed as Wanda Barbara.

Lisicki and Holdsworth were also active in the Disability Arts Movement, which adopted the slogan "Piss On Pity" and protested stereotypes of disabled people in advertising, films, and by charities. In 1989, Lisicki participated on the BBC discussion show Network and explained the opposition to how disabled people were portrayed, stating, "If you make a disabled person an object of charity, you're not going to see them as your equal". After ITV Studios began charity telethons, Holdsworth was asked to help organize protests against the depiction of disabled people. According to Lisicki, "These were hideous TV telethons that lasted something like 27 hours and portrayed disabled people in a manner where they should be pitied. It wasn't representative of the disabled community and was patronising." In 1990 and 1992, the Disability Arts Movement was involved in the Block Telethon protests outside of ITV Studios, with Lisicki and Holdsworth serving as organizers in 1992 for a protest that included over 1000 people blocking celebrities from entering the studio building. ITV Studios ended its telethon after 1992.

In 1993, Lisicki, Holdworth, and Sue Elsegood became founders of the Disabled People's Direct Action Network (DAN). DAN organized protests and nonviolent civil disobedience to promote the rights of disabled people, and Lisicki explained in 2015, "We brought people together who had had enough of not having any protection against discrimination." Acts of civil disobedience in the 1990s included protesters blocking roads and chaining themselves to buses. Protest locations included the Westminster Bridge, the Nottinghamshire constituency office of Kenneth Clarke, Harrods, and the Tate Gallery.

In 1995, the Disability Discrimination Act became law, providing the first protections against disability discrimination in the UK, and protests continued, including a sit-in at Labour party headquarters in 1996, and in 1997, protesters chaining themselves to the gates of Downing Street. In 2015, Lisicki stated, "Some people thought 'we've won with the Disability Discrimination Act' [...] We didn't win. It was never a victory. All that I ever say to people is that at least now the government agrees with us that discrimination happens." In 1999, Lisicki appeared at the end of The Disabled Century, a BBC production about the history of disability in the 20th century, which included her arrest at a demonstration and the activism of DAN.

DAN continued as an active protest group into the 2000s, with Lisicki serving as a spokesperson, and eventually disbanded. In 2019, the National Disability Art Collection and Archive opened, and holds thousands of items from the Disability Arts Movement. In 2022, Lisicki was a featured subject in the BBC docudrama Then Barbara Met Alan.

== Personal life ==
Lisicki and Alan Holdsworth have an adult child called Jasia (they/them), and a granddaughter.
