= Carsten Jensen =

Danish author (born 1952)

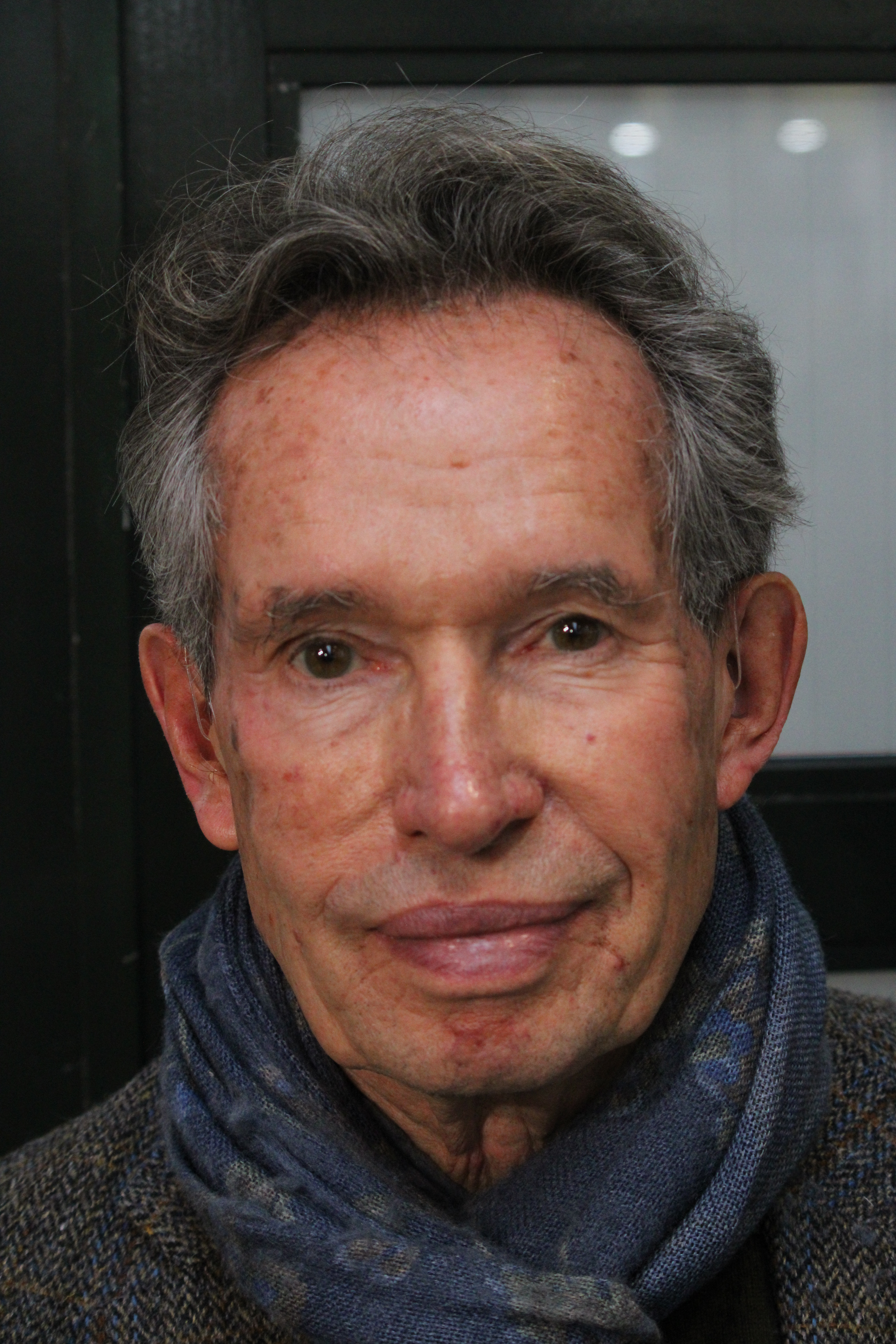
- Jensen in 2025
- Born: 24 July 1952 (age 74); Marstal, Denmark
- Occupations: Author, political columnist
- Spouse: Liz Jensen
- Writing career
- Years active: 1975–present

Carsten Jensen (born 24 July 1952) is a Danish author and political columnist. He first earned recognition as a literary critic for the Copenhagen daily, Politiken. His books, including I Have Seen the World Begin (1996), deal with knowledge of the world. For this novel he won the Danish booksellers award De Gyldne Laurbær (The Golden Laurel) in 1996. The year 2006 saw the publication of his novel Vi, de druknede (We, the Drowned), a chronicle about the birth of modern Denmark, seen through the history of his hometown Marstal.

In 2015, Den første sten (The First Stone) appeared, a monumental novel about the experiences of a group of Danish soldiers who have volunteered for service in Afghanistan. Through their eyes, we are presented with a wide and disturbing panorama of the war in Afghanistan. As of March 2018, the novel has been translated into German, Der erste Stein, as well as into Norwegian and Swedish. The English translation was released on 1 September 2019.

He is married to English novelist Liz Jensen. His stepson was actor Raphaël Coleman.

== Awards and honours ==
In 2009, he was awarded the Olof Palme Prize. In 2012, he was awarded the Søren Gyldendal Prize.

== Bibliography ==
- Salg, klasse og død (1975)
- Sjælen sidder i øjet (1985)
- På en mørkeræd klode (1986)
- Souvenirs fra 80'erne (1988)
- Kannibalernes nadver (1988)
- Jorden i munden (1991)
- Af en astmatisk kritikers bekendelser (1992)
- Forsømmelsernes bog (1993)
- Jeg har set verden begynde (1996)
  - I Have Seen the World Begin: Travels through China, Cambodia, and Vietnam (Houghton Mifflin Harcourt, 2002) ISBN 9780151007684
- Jeg har hørt et stjerneskud (1997)
- År to & tre (1999)
- Oprøret mod tyngdeloven (2001)
- Jorden rundt (2003)
- Livet i Camp Eden (2004)
- Det glemte folk – en rejse i Burmas grænseland (2004)
- Vi, de druknede (2006)
  - We, the Drowned (Houghton Mifflin Harcourt, 2011) ISBN 9780151013777
- Sidste rejse (2007)
- Vi sejlede bare – virkeligheden bag Vi, de druknede (2009)
- Ud (2010)
- Den første sten (2015)
  - The First Stone (2019) ISBN 9781542044394
- Krigen der aldrig ender. News stories from Afghanistan. Co-author: Anders Hammer. (Gyldendal 2016)
- Kældermennesker. (Politikens Forlag 2018)
