= Alan Holdsworth =

Musician and disability rights activist (born 1952)

- Born: 1952 (age 73–74); Salford, Greater Manchester, England
- Occupations: musician; disability rights activist

Alan Holdsworth (born 1952 in Salford, stage name Johnny Crescendo) is a British musician and disability rights activist living in Philadelphia, United States.

He participated in the 1990 and 1992 Block Telethon campaign while living in the United Kingdom. In 2013, he founded the first Disability Pride event in the United States.

The 2022 BBC Two docudrama Then Barbara Met Alan tells the story of Holdsworth and Barbara Lisicki and their work with the Disabled People's Direct Action Network.

Holdsworth has been affected by polio and uses a wheelchair.
