= Steve Cribb =

Steve Cribb (Peter Stephen Cribb 1944–1994) was an English disability rights activist, artist, collector and numismatist.

== Disability activism ==
Cribb was in public office as a London Borough of Hounslow councillor and later as a development officer for the disabled in the same borough. He is particularly well known for his artworks, working with the London Disability Art Forum and Shape Arts. He was the grandson of the sculptor, letter cutter and carver Joseph Cribb and brother of the numismatist Joe Cribb.

Exhibitions

- 1991 Hanging Up in Hounslow, at Louder than Words Festival (May 1991)
- 1992 Wilder than Lourdes: The Alternative Cabaret Party, at Louder than Words Festival (March 1992)
- 1993 Defiance: Art Confronting Disability (City Museum and Art Gallery, Stoke-on-Trent) (April 1993)
- 1993 How We Like It (LDAF exhibition, Diorama Arts Center) (November 1993)
- 1994 Famous Now I'm Dead - Steve Cribb retrospective (Waterman Art Gallery) (August 1994)
- 1995 Unleashed: Images and Experience of Disability (Laing Art Gallery, Newcastle) (January 1995)
- 1998 Postal Strike! (March 1998)

== Numismatics ==
Cribb collected Chinese coins, Chinese paper money, postal orders, co-operative tokens, school medals and religious medals. He was one of the founders of the Oriental Numismatic Society. Some of his collections are now in the British Museum, including the Steve Cribb Collection of religious medals. A selection from this vast collection was displayed in the exhibition "Receive our prayers: the Steve Cribb Collection of Catholic medals" at the British Museum, in 1995. The residue of his religious medal collection is in the University of Bergen Museum collection.

Numismatic Publications

- The standard catalogue of postal orders. Vol.1, The British Postal Order, 1881-1981 (c.1984. ISBN 9780947604004)
- Northants Co-op societies & their tokens (with Christopher J. Glazebrook) (Northampton Heritage Hunters, 1983. ISBN 9781908975010)
