= Ian Stanton =

Music

Ian Stanton (1950–1998) was a British singer-songwriter and disability rights activist. He was known for his ironic lyrics about the civil rights struggle of disabled people. He was also an actor on stage and national TV. He worked at the Greater Manchester Coalition of Disabled People as the editor of the Coalition magazine.

== Early years and family ==
Ian Stanton was born in Oldham in October 1950, and was educated at the local grammar school. He first worked as a printer until developing Berger's Disease in the 1970s, which led to the amputation of both his legs.

After recovering in hospital, he went to the Queen Elizabeth's Foundation for Disabled People, a rehabilitation college in Surrey, where he reportedly became the first disabled person to be expelled for his newsletter, The Tuppenny Terrible, a work that was highly critical of the college.

On 14 February 1994, he married Audrey Savage, a co-worker at the Greater Manchester Coalition of Disabled People, at Oldham Register Office. He had one step-son.

== Work ==
After leaving the Queen Elizabeth's Foundation college and returning to live in Oldham, he went to New Vale House, a day centre where he established a newsletter in 1984, which was highly critical of the organization.

He was employed by the Greater Manchester Coalition of Disabled People in 1986, becoming their first Information Worker. He soon established its magazine - Coalition - which gained a national reputation for its polished coverage of disabled people's politics. The Coalition magazine was recognized in university-level textbooks and papers as a key source of knowledge for disability studies. He also produced a regular Information Sheet with details of local events and contacts.

He retired for health reasons in the mid-1990s and continued to edit the Coalition as a volunteer member until his death on 26 November 1998.

== Music ==
After following a course taught by Richard Stilgoe at the Northern College, Stanton began singing at clubs around Oldham and Ashton, notably the Witchwood Live Music Pub, and subsequently went on to perform in day centres, disability arts cabarets, rallies and at mainstream events.

He notably performed at Glastonbury Festival, Vancouver Folk Music Festival, Edinburgh Fringe, and Cambridge Folk Festival, and toured the US with Johnny Crescendo and Wanda Barbara

He was a leading player at the Block Telethon demo in 1992, his set including Message from Telethon (to you) (C. Avison / I. Stanton), the lyrics of which had been written by Cathy Avison, a leading member of the Greater Manchester Coalition of Disabled People, who had died in the spring before the protest.

== Archive ==
His family have placed 304 of his papers and artefacts, the Ian Stanton Collection, in the GMCDP Archive in the Central Library, Manchester, which exists in partnership with Archives+.

=== Discography ===
Ian Stanton, Shrinkin' Man tape cassette, 1989, self-released

- Shrinkin' Man (I. Stanton)
- Chip on yer Shoulder (I. Stanton)
- We've Got Each Other (I. Stanton)
- S.O.S. (I. Stanton)
- Lady's Chamber (I. Stanton)
- Someone Said (I. Stanton)
- Sweet Reason (I. Stanton)
- Tap Room Boys (I. Stanton)
- Talkin' Disabled Anarchist (I. Stanton)
- Money Talks (I. Stanton)

Ian Stanton, Freewheelin' tape cassette, 1992, self-released

- A Bloody Funny Way (I. Stanton)
- Foot Fetish Blues (I. Stanton)
- Remember Douglas Bader (I. Stanton)
- If I Could Talk to You (R. Crombie)
- Tragic but Brave (I. Stanton)
- Story (I. Stanton)
- The Glee Club (I. Stanton)
- Angela (I. Stanton)
- Message from Telethon (to you) (C. Avison / I. Stanton)
- Pushin' 40 (I. Stanton)

Ian Stanton, Rollin' Thunder CD, 1995, Stream Records

- Invisible (I. Stanton)
- Chip on yer Shoulder (I. Stanton)
- Rollin' Thunder (I. Stanton)
- Remember Douglas Bader (I. Stanton)
- In the Meantime (I. Stanton)
- Talkin' Disabled Anarchist (I. Stanton)
- Bloody Funny Way (I. Stanton)
- Takin Liberties (I. Stanton)
- Tragic but Brave (I. Stanton)
- Angela (I. Stanton)
- Holdin' On (I. Stanton)
- Tap Room Boys (I. Stanton)

Not recorded as album tracks:

- Poor Dear
- Head Over Heels
- Charity Knocks

=== Major gigs ===
- Block Telethon, LWT Studios, London, 27 May 1990
- Queens Festival Belfast, November 1991
- Glastonbury Festival, June 1992
- Block Telethon, LWT Studios, London 1992
- Vancouver Folk Music Festival, Canada, July 1992
- EUCREA Colloquium, Maastricht, November 1992
- Disabled and Proud Celebration, Minneapolis USA, August 1993
- Cambridge Folk Festival, 1996 Plus:
  - The Restricted Growth Convention, Manchester, 18 October 1997, where Ian said he felt very honoured to be asked to perform at this event.

=== Drama, actor ===
- Dog's Dinner, theatre play written Anne Dodd, Derby, October 1997
- Holby City, series 1 episode 2, "Happy Families", first broadcast 19 January 1999, recorded 11 and 21 October 1998, [working title: Surgical II], with end-credit memorial to Ian.

=== Documentary TV, featuring ===
- BBC TV, One in Four, 1990
- Channel 4, Link programme, 1993
- BBC2 TV, Over the Edge, 1993

=== Journalism and editing ===
- The Tuppenny Terrible, Queen Elizabeth's Foundation for the Disabled (rehabilitation college)
- New Vale House (day centre) newsletter, 1984–1988
- Coalition magazine, Greater Manchester Coalition of Disabled People, 1986-1998
