= List of disability studies journals =

This is a list of academic journals in the field of disability studies. These journals publish scholarly articles, research, and reviews that contribute to the understanding and knowledge of disability studies.

- Disability & Society
- Disability Studies Quarterly
- Disability and Rehabilitation
- Disability and Rehabilitation: Assistive Technology
- Focus on Autism and Other Developmental Disabilities
- Journal of Disability Policy Studies
- Journal of Intellectual & Developmental Disability
- Journal of Intellectual Disabilities
- Journal of Learning Disabilities
- Journal of Literary and Cultural Disability Studies
- Learning Disability Practice
- Learning Disability Quarterly
- Review of Disability Studies
- Journal of Disability Studies
