= Qwo-Li Driskill =

American poet and scholar

Qwo-Li Driskill speaking at Highline College in 2017. An assistive cane is visible.

Qwo-Li (Note: Driskill's first name is written to be appropriated from the Cherokee people. As it is the name they are referred to in published sources, it will be sometimes used in this article.) Driskill is a poet and scholar. They (Note: Driskill uses they/them pronouns.) formerly worked as a professor at Oregon State University. In 2026, an OSU panel concluded that Driskill had engaged in research misconduct regarding their claim to Cherokee heritage.

== Personal life ==
Driskill's father died in 2010.

Driskill has said they have complex post-traumatic stress disorder and multiple chronic illnesses.

== Career ==
Driskill was a tenured associate professor at Oregon State University, and organized the queer studies curriculum. They were also the co-editor of Queer Indigenous Studies: Critical Interventions is Theory, Politics, and Literature, and Sovereign Erotics: A Collection of Two-Spirit Literature. Some of Driskill's academic colleagues have been Patti Duncan, Scott Lauria Morgensen, Angie Cruz, Terese Guinsatao Monberg, and Angela Pulley Hudson.

=== Works ===
Qwo-Li Driskill has authored multiple works, including Walking with Ghosts: Poems, and Asegi Stories: Cherokee Queer and Two-Spirit Memory. In Driskill published Asegi Stories in 2016, where they discussed two-spirit people. In the book, they refer to The Lady of Cofitachequi as a queer person who can be imagined as occupying an 'asegi space'. They coined the phrase sovereign erotic, where they relate the relationship of the erotic with its impact on the larger community, saying the erotic had been colonized. Scholar Alex Young writes that Driskill's resignation, after Indigenous activists investigated them for ethnic fraud, had harmed the credibility of their work.

== Indigenous identity fraud and grievances ==
In November 2023, Tribal Alliance Against Frauds published findings stating that Driskill had falsely claimed to be of Osage, Lenape, Lumbee, and Cherokee heritage. Driskill claimed to be a non-enrolled descendant of Native Americans, and TAAF's report stated that they had no Native or Black ancestry. TAAF requested that OSU fire Driskill unless they publicly apologized. Graduate students drafted a letter to the leadership of OSU outlining their grievances against Driskill. These grievances included intimidation, coercion, fear of retaliation, and discrimination against students with disabilities. The students also wrote that accommodations were not offered to disabled students, even though Driskill had personally used them before. They were initially booked to teach courses in the fall of 2024, to the protest of students. As of September 2024, Driskill was no longer employed at OSU.

In 2026, an OSU panel concluded that Driskill had engaged in research misconduct regarding their claim to Cherokee heritage. OSU stated they were reaching out to former students and tribal representatives to address harm caused by the misconduct.

=== Scholarly analyses ===
Scholar Jason Hockaday writes that Qwo-Li Driskill had often begun their works with generalized storytelling motifs, to evoke Native American storytelling, and legitimize their claim to Native American identity. He compares this to Appalachian writers, saying that it is revealing when some begin their works similarly, writing it can function as mimicry of Native American oral traditions.

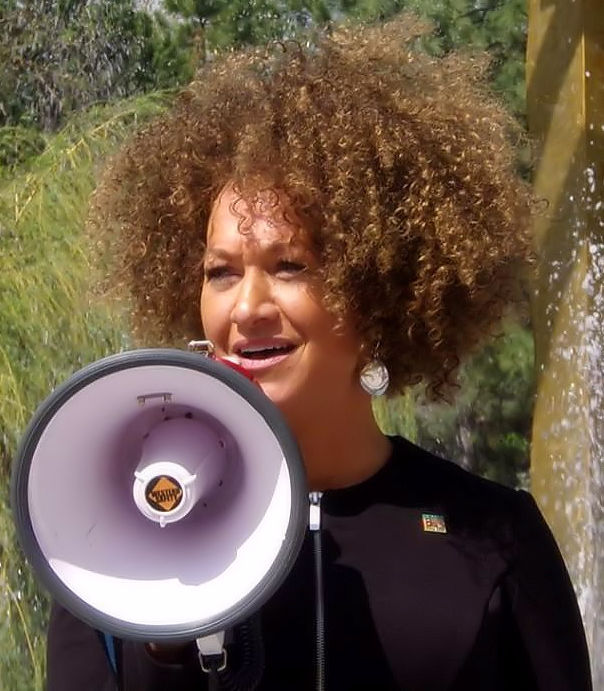
Bateman writes that figures like Driskill and Dolezal threaten resistance movements.

Comparing them to Rachel Dolezal, scholar Dylan Bateman writes that Driskill and Dolezal both "shapeshifted" to center themselves over people of color. He cites commentary on white feminist and white queer movements, which propose they attempt to redefine Native and African culture. He says this is similar to Driskill and Dolezal redefining Blackness and Indigeneity for themselves, rather than seeking coexistence.

Bateman suggests Driskill wished to separate themself from the structure of whiteness rather than reform the structure itself. He quotes Kim Tallbear's writing, wherein she poses that individuals dislike feeling complicit in settler-colonialism and the genocide of Indigenous peoples. He writes that Driskill's writings of their dislike of their body could reflect their disgust with their own whiteness, due to which they adopt an Indigenous identity. Bateman says this allows Driskill to redefine and override what Indigeneity and two-spiritness is, and relinquish the roles and responsibilities of a settler. He states this redefinition results in the opening up of the two-spirit category, after which European settlers can inhabit it.

Bateman also compares Driskill to Andrea Smith, saying both took opportunities from actual Indigenous people and made themselves key figures in Indigenous movements. His conclusion is the nature of "shapeshifters" like Driskill and Dolezal undermine resistance movements.

Referencing We Have Never Been Woke by Musa al-Gharbi, scholar Azadeh Ghanizadeh writes that Driskill's case is not an anomaly. He says it is a result of an academic structure that incentivizes "symbolic professions", where members of the structure often already possess a material advantage. Ghanizadeh writes that within this structure, minority statuses are used as symbolic capital and credibility, while upward mobility is constrained for all groups and racial wealth patterns remain unchanging.

== See also ==
- Ableism
- Cultural cringe
- Disability studies
- Disability studies in education
- Elizabeth Hoover (social scientist)
- Gender studies
- Intersectionality
- Job fraud
- Plastic shaman
- Playing Indian
- Social capital
- Thomas King (novelist)
- Transgender studies
- Whiteness studies
