= Alison Kafer =

American academic

- Occupation: Professor of Feminist Studies
- Known for: Feminist, queer, and disability theory
- Title: Associate professor

Academic background
- Education: PhD
- Alma mater: Claremont Graduate University

Academic work
- Discipline: Liberal Arts
- Sub-discipline: Feminist studies
- Main interests: Feminist and disability theory
- Notable works: Feminist, Queer, Crip
- Notable ideas: Crip Time
- Website: https://liberalarts.utexas.edu/english/faculty/ak34238

Alison Kafer is an American academic specializing in feminist, queer, and disability theory. As of 2019, she is an associate professor of feminist studies at the University of Texas, Austin. She is the author of the book Feminist, Queer, Crip.

== Education ==
Kafer graduated in 1993 with a B.A. with Honors in Art from Wake Forest University in Winston-Salem, North Carolina. In 2000, she received an M.A. in Women's Studies and Religion, followed by a Ph.D. in 2005, both from Claremont Graduate University in Claremont, California.

== Career ==
Kafer has held a variety of academic positions at several universities in the United States.

After her M.A., she was a Visiting Dissertation Fellow in Women's Studies at the University of California, Santa Barbara from 2002 to 2003. Following her Ph.D. she was an Ed Roberts Fellow in Disability Studies at the University of California, Berkeley from 2006 to 2007.

Kafer taught at Southwestern University in Georgetown, Texas from 2004 to 2018, and was promoted to Professor of Feminist Studies in 2015. She also servied as Chair of Feminist Studies from 2010 to 2018 and Associate Dean of Humanities from 2014 to 2016. Kafer won the 2008 Southwestern Teaching Award for her "outstanding performance in the classroom" as a non-tenured faculty member.

As of 2019, Kafer is the Embrey Associate Professor of Women's and Gender Studies as well as associate professor of English at the University of Texas in Austin. She has served on multiple nonprofit boards, including What's Your Issue?; the Society for Disability Studies; and Generations Ahead.

== Works ==
Kafer focuses on political/relational framings of disability to create coalitional opportunities for "cross-movement social justice work, namely how to think disability in and through movements for environmental, gender, racial, and reproductive justice".

=== Feminist, Queer, Crip ===
Kafer's major work, a book titled Feminist, Queer, Crip, was published by Indiana University Press in 2013. The book argues that feminist, queer, and disability studies are intricately linked. The book was well received in academic journals, although Barbara Neukirchinger in Feminist Review stated, "... it runs a risk of not being accessible to a wider audience outside of academia".

Rosemarie Garland-Thomson of the Journal of Literary & Cultural Disability Studies wrote, "Feminist, Queer, Crip makes significant contributions to our understanding of how disability works in the world, contributions that no other academic book in the recently emergent field of interdisciplinary disability studies has done so thoroughly." Eliza Chandler of the Canadian Journal of Disability Studies wrote, "This book breathes the poetics of disability life, a life that is consistently under threat, in a way that is complex, clear, highly accessible, and grounded in the politics of everyday life. For this reason, it may not be just that this book is highly teachable (which it is); this is a book that must be included in any disability studies, queer theory, and feminist theory curricula."

Sami Schalk of Disability Studies Quarterly wrote, "Where else can we locate and bring attention to issues of ability and disability in the academy and beyond? Alison Kafer finds it on the billboards on her way home, in the news stories about cybernetic technology, on the hiking trails in state parks, and in the future or futures we imagine and create for ourselves. In the end, Feminist, Queer, Crip reminds us what we in some ways already know—issues of ability and disability are all around us—but Kafer doesn't just remind us of this fact with her book, she also prompts us to do more with our scholarship and activism by being a bright and innovative example of powerful, intersectional and grounded disability theory."

Jenny Slater of the journal Disability & Society stated, "[T]his book will be of interest to activists, students and academics, working along feminist, queer, crip lines, who want to imagine futures otherwise. Some chapters may be tricky for those unfamiliar with the texts discussed. However, every chapter—not least the activist presents—provide a starting place for much needed dialogue of subjects that are too often silent."

Victoria Kannen of the Journal of Gender Studies gave the book a positive review, and stated Kafer "convincingly argues the ways in which disability is political". The journal also stated the book is "more than informative" and "beautifully confronts the limits of language". Julie Passanante Elman of QED: A Journal in GLBTQ Worldmaking stated Kafter made "theoretical contributions to a dizzying array of fields, including feminist theory, environmental studies, queer theory, transgender studies, disability studies, and bioethics". Eunjung Kim of philoSOPHIA stated Kafter challenges "the assumption that any desirable future would naturally be the future without disability and illness".

Emma Sheppard of the Journal of the International Network for Sexual Ethics & Politics stated Feminist, Queer, Crip is "intensely personal" for Kafer, as she recounts her own disability in within the book and draws on other stories as well. Sheppard stated, "Kafer's concern for future is a crip concern" and examines time through crip time. Eve Lacey of Studies in the Maternal said that Kafer "writes with an acute awareness of intersectionality and her understanding of reproductive politics repeatedly challenges ableist notions of care, future, and productivity".

=== Other works ===
==== Chapters and essays ====
Kafer has contributed to a number of anthologies, including Feminist Disability Studies and Sex and Disability.

==== Journal articles ====
Articles by Kafer have been published in the Disability Studies Quarterly, the Journal of Literary and Cultural Disability Studies, and South Atlantic Quarterly.

==== As editor ====
Kafer co-edited the book Deaf and Disability Studies: Interdisciplinary Perspectives, published by Gallaudet University Press in 2010, with Susan Burch. She also co-edited "Growing Disability Studies", a 2014 special issue of the journal Disability Studies Quarterly, with Michelle Jarman.

== Personal life ==
Kafer grew up in New Bern, North Carolina. She began using a wheelchair after sustaining extensive injuries in a 1994 building fire in Asheville, North Carolina.
