= Mad studies =

Field of scholarship

Mad studies is a field of scholarship, theory, and activism about the lived experiences, history, cultures, and politics about people who may identify as mad, mentally ill, psychiatric survivors, consumers, service users, patients, neurodivergent, and disabled. Mad studies originated from consumer/survivor movements organized in Canada, the United States, the United Kingdom, Australia, and in other parts of the world. The methods for inquiry draw from a number of academic disciplines such as women's studies, critical race theory, indigenous epistemologies, queer studies, psychological anthropology, and ethnography. This field shares theoretical similarities to critical disability studies, psychopolitics, and critical social theory. The academic movement formed, in part, as a response to recovery movements, which many mad studies scholars see as being "co-opted" by mental health systems. In 2021, the first academic journal of mad studies, the International Journal of Mad Studies, was launched.

== Origins and scope ==
Richard A. Ingram, a senior research fellow in the School of Disability Studies at Toronto Metropolitan University (2007), has been credited with coining the phrase "Mad Studies" at the First Regional Graduate/Undergraduate Student Disability Studies Conference at Syracuse University on May 3, 2008. In an academic article entitled "Doing Mad Studies: Making (Non)sense Together," Ingram points to a number of theorists who created the intellectual groundwork for the field, including Nietzsche, Bataille, Blanchot, Deleuze, and Guattari.

In a 2014 Guardian article, Peter Beresford names Canadian scholars at the forefront of this academic field: "Mad studies has been pioneered by Ryerson and York Universities in Toronto, with key figures such as mental health survivors, activists and educators David Reville and Geoffrey Reaume and academics Kathryn Church and Brenda LeFrancois." Journalist Alex Gillis summarizes the spread of mad studies programs in a November 2015 article: "Soon after Ryerson and York launched mad studies courses in the early 2000s, similar courses began in Simon Fraser University's department of sociology and anthropology, and more recently at Memorial University's school of social work, Queen's University's school of kinesiology and health studies, and the history departments at Trent University and the University of Winnipeg. A few universities in England, Scotland and the Netherlands launched courses in the past two years, using Canadian courses as models."

Some dimensions of this emerging field may include research on the "social construction of mental illness, normalizing imperatives of the state and medicine, rapidly expanding nosologies (categories of pathology) for mental illness, collusion(s) of pharmaceutical corporations and professional associations within psychiatry, connections between ecocide and mental stress, psychiatrization of nonhuman animals, representation(s) of madness in media, history of consumer/survivor movement(s), and the rise and fall of mental treatments within scientific, medical, and lay communities."

Mad people have traditionally been excluded from shaping what constitutes expert knowledge about themselves. Mad-positive pedagogies often center on ways Mad persons' experiences represent sites of/for learning holding deep knowledge and value. "Mad studies represents an evolving interdisciplinary field in which Mad studies scholars often seek to disrupt, counter, and nuance dominant discourses on mental health." As such, Mad Studies informed pedagogical approaches emphasize Mad persons' perspectives as a way to counter sanist oppression and reshape curriculum to better appreciate and understand Mad subjects. Thereby refuting a pedagogy of saneness and opening new possibilities. Teaching from a Mad Studies informed lens requires unlearning normativity, rethinking sanist paradigms, and represents a disruptive critical praxis.

== Connection with disability studies ==
Mad Studies is greatly connected with Disability Studies, though it veers from certain discourses.

Like disability studies, Mad Studies developed from existing activist movements and relies on social models of disability, which argue that "disablement is the outcome of a range of structural, social, cultural and political forces which are disabling, rather than the inevitable consequence of individual impairment." Further, both frameworks hold central the concerns of those impacted by the discourses (i.e., Mad people and people with disabilities), as see those impacted as producing vital knowledge.

However, while the disability movement included Mad individuals, physical disabilities were centered, particularly in developing Disability Studies. This becomes more apparent in the centering of impairment versus disability. According to Disabled Peoples' International, impairment refers to "the functional limitation within the individual caused by physical, mental or sensory impairment," where disability refers to "the loss or limitation of opportunities to take part in the normal life of the community on an equal level with others due to physical and social barriers." People with mental health conditions may feel the language of impairment does not apply to their experience.

Further, though lay individuals with mental health conditions may dislike the language of madness, they also do not feel the social model of disability adequately represents their needs and struggles.

== Conferences and symposiums ==
- June 12–15, 2008, Simon Fraser University, Madness, Citizenship, and Social Justice Conference
- May 2012, Ryerson University, International Conference on Mad Studies
- September 9–11, 2014, Lancaster University, Disability Studies Conference (stream that focused on Mad Studies)
- May 2015, Bergen, Norway, Nordic Network for Disability Research, Mad Studies Symposium
- June 17, 2015, Liverpool, UK, PsychoPolitics in the Twenty First Century: Peter Sedgwick and Radical Movements in Mental Health
- June 2015, Lancaster University, Mad Studies and Neurodiversity- Exploring Connections
- September 30 – October 1, 2015, Durham University, UK, Making Sense of Mad Studies
- September 6–8, 2016, Lancaster University, Disability Studies Conference (stream that focused on Mad Studies)
- September 11–13, 2018, Lancaster University, Disability Studies Conference (stream that focused on Mad Studies)

== Key texts ==
- This is Survivor Research, edited by Angela Sweeney, Peter Beresford, Allison Faulkner, Mary Nettle, and Diana Rose (2009)
- Mad at School: Rhetorics of Mental Disability and Academic Life, by Margaret Price (2011)
- Mad Matters: A Critical Reader in Canadian Mad Studies, edited by Brenda A. LeFrançois, Robert Menzies, and Geoffrey Reaume (2013)
- Psychiatry Disrupted: Theorizing Resistance and Crafting the (R)evolution, edited by Bonnie Burstow, Brenda A. LeFrançois, and Shaindl Diamond (2014)
- Decolonizing Global Mental Health: The Psychiatrization of the Majority World by China Mills (2014)
- Disability Incarcerated: Imprisonment and Disability in the United States and Canada, edited by Liat Ben-moshe, Allison C. Carey, and Chris Chapman (2014)
- Madness, Distress, and the Politics of Disablement, edited by Helen Spandler, Jill Anderson, and Bob Sapey (2015)
- Psychiatry and the Business of Madness: An Ethical and Epistemological Accounting by Bonnie Burstow (2015)
- Searching for a Rose Garden: Challenging Psychiatry, Fostering Mad Studies, edited by Jasna Russo and Angela Sweeney (2016)
- Deportation and the Confluence of Violence within Forensic Mental Health and Immigration Systems by Ameil J. Joseph (2015)
- How to Go Mad Without Losing Your Mind: Madness and Black Radical Creativity by La Marr Jurelle Bruce (2021)
