= Liat Ben-Moshe =

American disability scholar

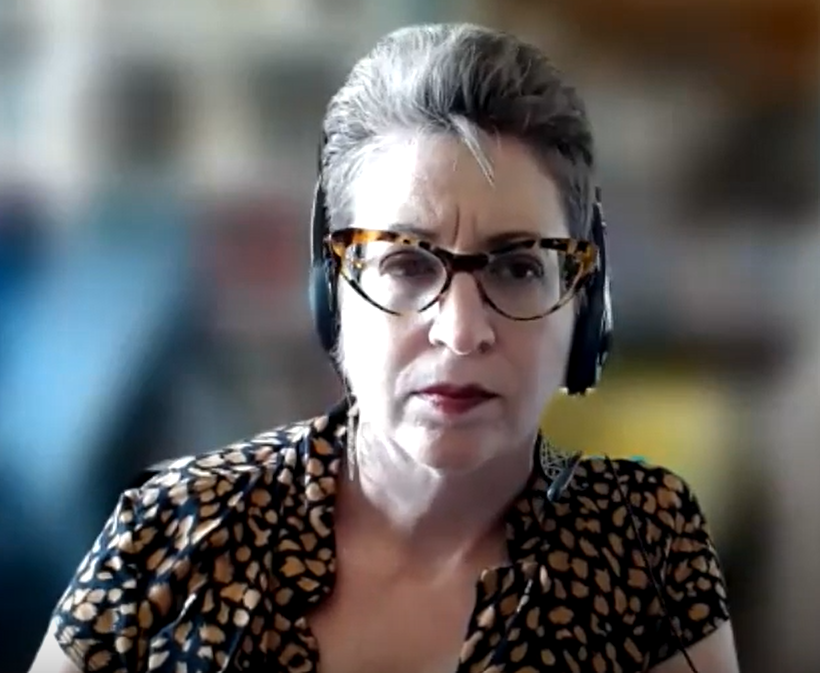
Ben-Moshe in 2023.

Liat Ben-Moshe is a disability scholar and associate professor of criminology, law, and justice at the University of Illinois Chicago. Ben-Moshe holds a PhD in sociology from Syracuse University with concentrations in women's and gender studies and disability studies. Ben-Moshe's major works include the edited Building Pedagogical Curb Cuts: Incorporating Disability into the University Classroom and Curriculum (2005) and Disability Incarcerated: Imprisonment and Disability in the United States and Canada (2014), as well as Decarcerating Disability: Deinstitutionalization and Prison Abolition (2020). Ben-Moshe is best known for her theories of dis-epistemology, genealogy of deinstitutionalization, and race-ability.

== Life and career ==
Ben-Moshe completed a PhD in sociology from Syracuse University in 2011 with concentrations in women and gender studies and disability studies. In 2017, she received the American Association of University Women American Postdoctoral Research Leave Fellowship.

Ben-Moshe works as an associate professor of criminology, law, and justice at the University of Illinois Chicago. Ben-Moshes's academic research focuses on incarceration and prison abolition; disability studies and mad studies; feminist, queer, and critical race theory; and activism. Ben-Moshe is most well known for her works on carceral ableism, specifically her books Disability Incarcerated (2014) and Decarcerating Disability (2020).

== Major works ==
=== Building Pedagogical Curb Cuts ===
Building Pedagogical Curb Cuts: Incorporating Disability into the University Classroom and Curriculum, edited by Liat Ben-Moshe, Rebecca C. Cory, Mia Feldbaum, and Ken Sagendorf, was published in 2005 through the graduate school of Syracuse University. Building Pedagogical Curb Cuts expands beyond strategies for compliance with the Americans with Disabilities Act of 1990 and looks towards disability-inclusive pedagogy in university classrooms.

=== Disability Incarcerated ===
Disability Incarcerated: Imprisonment and Disability in the United States and Canada was published in 2014 by Palgrave Macmillan. The book was edited by Liat Ben-Moshe, Chris Chapman, and Allison C. Carey, with a foreword by Angela Davis. Disability Incarcerated takes an interdisciplinary approach to incarceration and disability studies.

=== Decarcerating Disability ===
Decarcerating Disability: Deinstitutionalization and Prison Abolition was published by University of Minnesota Press in 2020. In the book, Ben-Moshe expands the concept of abolition using a genealogy of deinstitutionalization in the twentieth century. Ben-Moshe coins this new version of abolition as dis-epistemology. She examines the prison industrial complex through discussions on how deinstitutionalization is wrongly blamed for the influx of incarceration, why race and disability must be examined together (a theory she calls “race-ability”), and the limits of inclusion discourse for disability rights.

== Theories ==
=== Dis-epistemology ===
Dis-epistemology is an abolition theory created by Ben-Moshe that sees abolition as not a goal but a radical epistemological process. In her book, Decarcerating Disability, Ben-Moshe explains how "abolition is a radical epistemology of knowing and unknowing" and dis-epistemology is "letting go of attachment to certain ways of knowing.”

=== Genealogy of deinstitutionalization ===
Ben-Moshe utilizes Michel Foucault's conception of genealogy to analyze the history of deinstitutionalization and the power structures that influenced it. In Decarcerating Disability (2020), Ben-Moshe conducts a “genealogical excavation of abolition within deinstitutionalization discourse” that “follows and nuances Foucault’s conception of genealogy, which is largely about uncovering subjugated, disqualified knowledge.”

=== Race-ability ===
In her works, Ben-Moshe examines the intersectional relationship between race, disability, and the prison-industrial complex. She connects the work of prison abolitionists to “begin understanding the ways in which criminalizing entails the construction of both race (especially blackness) and disability (especially mental difference) as dangerous.” Ben-Moshe coined this frame of analysis “race-ability”.

== Selected articles and book chapters ==
- Rodriguez, S.M.; Ben-Moshe, Liat; Rakes, H. (September 2020). "Carceral protectionism and the perpetually (in)vulnerable". Criminology & Criminal Justice. 20 (5).
- Ben-Moshe, Liat (September 2018). "Dis-epistemologies of Abolition". Critical Criminology. 26 (3).
- Ben-Moshe, Liat (June 23, 2018). "Dis-orientation, dis-epistemology and abolition". Feminist Philosophy Quarterly. 4 (2).
- Ben-Moshe, Liat (October 25, 2018). "Weaponizing Disability". Social Text Online.
- Ben-Moshe, Liat (2018). "The State of (Intersectional Critique of) State Violence". WSQ: Women's Studies Quarterly. 46 (3–4).
- Ben-Moshe, Liat (July 2017). "Why prisons are not 'The New Asylums'". Punishment & Society. 19 (3).
- Ben-Moshe, Liat (2014). "Deinstitutionalization: A Case Study in Carceral Abolition" (PDF). Scapegoat. 7.
- Ben-Moshe, Liat (May 2013). "Disabling Incarceration: Connecting Disability to Divergent Confinements in the USA". Critical Sociology. 39 (3).
- Ben-Moshe, Liat (2011), Carey, Allison C.; Scotch, Richard K. (eds.), "The Contested meaning of 'Community' in Discourses of Deinstitutionalization and Community Living in the Field of Developmental Disability", Research in Social Science and Disability, vol. 6, Emerald Group Publishing
- Ben‐Moshe, Liat; Powell, Justin J.W. (August 2007). "Sign of our times? Revis(it)ing the International Symbol of Access". Disability & Society. 22 (5).
- Ben-Moshe, Liat (March 15, 2006). "Infusing Disability in the Curriculum: The Case of Saramago's 'Blindness'". Disability Studies Quarterly. 26 (2).
