= Ruth Northway =

British nursing academic (born 1961)

Ruth Northway OBE FRCN FLSW
- Born: February 1961 (age 65)
- Occupations: Nurse and nursing academic

Academic background
- Education: University of Wales, Newport; University of Bristol
- Thesis: Oppression in the lives of people with learning difficulties: a participatory study (1998)

Academic work
- Sub-discipline: Learning disability nursing
- Institutions: University of South Wales; University of Wales College of Medicine

Ruth Northway OBE FRCN FLSW (born February 1961) is a British nurse and nursing academic specialising in learning disabilities. She is a professor of learning disability nursing at the University of South Wales.

== Biography ==
Northway, who is from Llantrisant in Mid Glamorgan, Wales, was born in 1961 and educated at Teignmouth Grammar School. She decided to become a nurse because she "enjoyed working with people with learning disabilities and this was the best way that [she] could do it", and subsequently spent some time as a learning disability nurse. In 1989, she started going into nurse education. In 1994, she graduated from the University of Wales, Newport, with a Master of Science degree in economics, and started working at the University of Wales College of Medicine (UWCM) as a lecturer. In 1998, she obtained a PhD from the University of Bristol, with her thesis "Oppression in the lives of people with learning difficulties: a participatory study."

In 1999, Northway moved from the UWCM's School of Nursing to the University of Glamorgan, which would later merge into the University of South Wales (USW) in 2013. As part of the USW academic staff, she became the United Kingdom's first Professor of Learning Disability Nursing, and in 2002, became the leader of the university's Unit for Development in Intellectual & Developmental Disabilities.

As an academic, Northway specialises in learning disabilities, participatory action research, and safeguarding. Her academic accomplishments in learning disability nursing include developing Internet forums and teaching higher education classes in the field. In 2013, she and Robert Jenkins published Safeguarding Adults in Nursing Practice. Northway has also held a Visiting Professorship at Ulster University's School of Nursing.

Northway is a member of the editorial committee of the Journal of Intellectual Disabilities, and was previously the journal's editor-in-chief from 2013 to 2019. From 2003 to 2007, she was the editor of Learning Disability Practice. In 2011, she became the chair of the Royal College of Nursing Research Society.

Northway has also led the Learning Disability Ministerial Advisory Group within the Welsh Government. She was a trustee of Tenovus Cancer Care from 2011 to 2015.

Northway was elected a fellow of the Royal College of Nursing in 2003 – becoming the second learning disability nurse to be elected – "for her outstanding contributions to research in the field of learning disability nursing". She became a Principal Fellow of the Higher Education Academy in 2015. Northway was appointed an Officer of the Order of the British Empire in the 2016 Birthday Honours for services to learning disability nursing. Northway won Nursing Times' 2018 Chief Nursing Officers' Award for Lifetime Achievement. Northway was elected a fellow of the Learned Society of Wales in 2021.
