= Christopher Bell (scholar) =

Disabilities scholar

- Born: Christopher M. Bell; 1974
- Died: December 25, 2009 (aged 34–35)
- Occupation: Disability studies scholar

Christopher M. Bell (1974 – December 25, 2009) was a disability studies scholar working in the area of HIV/AIDS, race and ethnicity. He was the former president of the Society for Disability Studies and contributed to national discussions about race, ethnicity and disability studies. His posthumously published anthology, Blackness and Disability: Critical Examinations and Cultural Interventions, grew from his early critique of disability studies as a "white discipline" that ignored the racial dimensions of studying disability. His 2006 essay, "Introducing White Disability Studies: A Modest Proposal", was published in the second edition of the Disability Studies Reader and established him as a notable disability studies scholar.

== Education and professional background ==
From August 2008 until the time of his death, Bell was an ARRT Fellow at the Center for Human Policy, Law and Disability Studies at Syracuse University. At Towson University in Maryland from 2006 to 2008, Bell was a lecturer and adviser in the Department of English; an affiliate faculty member in cultural studies, LGBT studies, and the Honors College; and the adviser of the Queer Student Union. Before 2006, Bell lived in Poland where he researched disability access and representation at the museum spaces of Auschwitz and Birkenau. He also taught cultural studies classes at the University of Bielsko-Biała and thesis writing classes at the Warsaw School of Social Psychology.

Bell was honored as a sexual icon of 2009 on the About.com: Sexuality website. He was a frequent invited speaker around the world on the topic of HIV/AIDS, race and disability. As an HIV-positive African American gay man diagnosed in 1997, Bell began speaking about HIV/AIDS education soon after he was diagnosed. He was included in an Emmy-nominated AIDS public service announcement for MTV. He was quoted as an expert on AIDS prevention/education in a 2003 New York Times Magazine article about gay black men living on the "down low". In 2009, he was interviewed for HIV Plus magazine on the topic of whether HIV transmission is murder.

Bell held a BA in English from the University of Central Missouri and an MA in English with an emphasis in rhetoric from the University of Illinois Chicago. He was a doctoral candidate in English at Nottingham Trent University in the United Kingdom, specializing in cultural studies and use of rhetoric in disability discourse, where his Ph.D. thesis topic was the "spectacle of American AIDS".

== Chris Bell Memorial Scholarship ==
Established by the Society for Disability Studies, "the Chris Bell Memorial Scholarship seeks to support people of color and non-white racial minorities doing scholarly work in the field of disability studies with preference for those whose work aligns with Chris's commitment to intersectionality, identity politics and activism." Scholarship applicants must be low income, a student, or an international person of color/of a non-white racial minority. The scholarship provides funds for a winner each year who is presenting at the Society for Disability Studies annual conference.

== Publications/presentations of Christopher M. Bell ==
- "I'm not the Man I Used to Be: Sex, HIV, and Cultural 'Responsibility'" in Sex and Disability, Eds Robert McRuer and Anna Mollow, Durham, NC: Duke University Press, 2012.
- Editor, Blackness and Disability: Critical Examinations and Cultural Interventions. (2012). East Lansing, Mich.: Michigan State University Press.
- Presenter, National Black Disability Coalition. (2008).
- "Introducing White Disability Studies: A Modest Proposal." (2006). The Disability Studies Reader. 2nd ed. Ed. Lennard J. Davis. New York, NY: Routledge, pp. 275–282.
- "To Act Is to Be Committed: AIDS Activism and Identity Politics in an English Graduate Program." (2002). Paper presented at the Queer Disability Conference, San Francisco, California.
- "Crossroads and Borderlands: Narratives of Intersecting Oppressions." (2002). Moderator: Chris Bell, Panelists: Heather MacAllister, Amanda Tink. Panel at the Queer Disability Conference, San Francisco, Calif.
