= Journal of Disability Policy Studies =

- Discipline: Disability studies
- Language: English
- Edited by: Mitchell Yell, James G. Shriner

Publication details
- History: 1990-present
- Publisher: SAGE Publications
- Frequency: Quarterly
- Impact factor: 1.104 (2017)

Standard abbreviations
- ISO 4: J. Disabil. Policy Stud.

Indexing
- ISSN: 1044-2073 (print); 1538-4802 (web)
- LCCN: 90641127
- OCLC no.: 19730450

Links
- Journal homepage; Online access; Online archive

The Journal of Disability Policy Studies is a quarterly peer-reviewed academic journal that covers the field of disability studies, including issues in ethics, public policy, and the law related to individuals with disabilities. The editors-in-chief are Mitchell Yell (University of South Carolina) and James G. Shriner (University of Illinois). It was established in 1990 and is currently published by SAGE Publications in association with the Hammill Institute on Disabilities.

== Abstracting and indexing ==
The Journal of Disability Policy Studies is abstracted and indexed in:

- CINAHL
- Contents Pages in Education
- EBSCO Nursing and Allied Health Collection
- Educational Research Abstracts Online
- Elsevier BIOBASE
- EMCare
- PAIS International
- PsycINFO
- Scopus
- Sociological Abstracts

According to the Journal Citation Reports, its 2017 impact factor is 1.104, ranking it 47 out of 69 journals in the category "Rehabilitation".
