= Rosemarie Garland-Thomson =

Scholar in English and disability studies

Professor Emerita Rosemarie Garland-Thomson
- Notable work: Staring: How We Look Extraordinary Bodies: Figuring Physical Disability in American Culture and Literature Freakery: Cultural Spectacles of the Extraordinary Body
- Website: rosemariegarlandthomson.com

Rosemarie Garland-Thomson is professor emerita of English at Emory University with a focus on disability studies and feminist theory. Her book Extraordinary Bodies, published in 1997, is a founding text in the disability studies canon.

Garland-Thomson attended the University of Nevada, Reno, from which she earned a Bachelor of Arts and Master of Arts (MA) in English. She then earned a Doctor of Philosophy in English from Brandeis University in 1993. In 2019, she earned an MA in Bioethics from Emory University.

In 2000, Garland-Thomson co-directed a National Endowment for the Humanities Summer Institute on disability studies, which shaped the development of many scholars who now lead the field, and was a founding member and co-chair for two years of the Modern Language Association Committee on Disability Issues in the Profession, which transformed the largest academic professional organization into a model of accessibility for organizations across the world. She established the field of feminist disability studies with seminal and definitional articles in feminist studies journals, including: "Integrating Disability, Transforming Feminist Theory", National Women’s Studies Association Journal (2002), which is reprinted in women’s studies and feminist textbooks and has been translated into Hebrew, Czech, and Turkish; and “Feminist Disability Studies: A Review Essay” in Signs: Journal of Women in Culture and Society (2005), which established a canon of feminist disability studies and set an agenda for future scholarship.

Garland-Thomson travels and speaks widely on the subject of disability studies in the US and abroad and has delivered major invited lectures and keynote addresses in: South Africa, Zimbabwe, Norway, Israel, Singapore, Sweden, Budapest, Canada, Germany, Iceland, Australia, the Netherlands, France, and England. Her extensive public intellectual work has advanced disability studies outside the university, including the following: images and ideas from her book Staring: How We Look (2009) were translated into an art exhibit at Davidson College in 2009 and was profiled in The Chronicle of Higher Education; she was selected as one of Utne Reader’s 2010 “50 Visionaries Who Are Changing Your World". She has consulted and collaborated extensively about inclusion programs and initiatives with the Smithsonian Institution, the National Endowments for the Humanities and Arts, and the National Park Service on the Franklin Delano Roosevelt Memorial; and her public scholarship pieces have appeared in well-known publications like The New York Times, The Huffington Post, and Al Jazeera. She is also frequently interviewed on the radio, for newspaper stories, and for documentary projects. In 2010, she received the Society for Disability Studies Senior Scholar Award for her contributions to building the field of disability studies.

== Publications ==
=== As author ===
- Garland-Thomson, Rosemarie (1996). Extraordinary Bodies: Figuring Physical Disability in American Culture and Literature. Columbia University Press. ISBN 978-0-231-10517-0.
- Garland-Thomson, Rosemarie (2009). Staring: How We Look. Oxford University Press. ISBN 978-0-19-532680-2.

=== As editor ===
- Garland-Thomson, Rosemarie, ed. (1996). Freakery: Cultural Spectacles of the Extraordinary Body. New York University Press. ISBN 978-0-814-78222-4.
- Snyder, Sharon L.; Brueggemann, Brenda Jo; Garland-Thomson, Rosemarie, eds. (2002). Disability Studies: Enabling the Humanities. Modern Language Association Press. ISBN 978-0-873-52981-5.
- Sandell, Richard; Dodd, Jocelyn; Garland-Thomson, Rosemarie, eds. (2010). Re-Presenting Disability: Agency and Activism in the Museum. Routledge. ISBN 978-0-415-49473-1.
- Catapano, Peter; Garland-Thomson, Rosemarie (eds.). About Us: Essays from the Disability Series of the New York Times. Narrated by Coleen Mario and Jonathan Todd Ross. Liveright. ISBN 978-1-684-57383-7.
- Garland-Thomson, Rosemarie; Chemers, Michael Mark; Santana, Analola, eds. (2024). Freak Inheritance: Eugenics and Extraordinary Bodies in Performance. Oxford University Press. ISBN 978-0-197-69112-0.
