= Musa al-Gharbi =

American sociologist

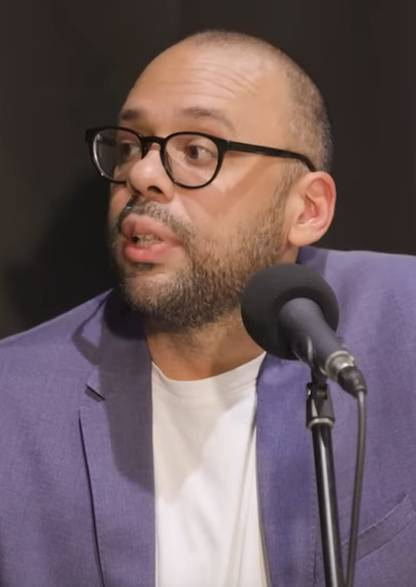
- Al-Gharbi on ReasonTV, 2024

Academic background
- Education: Cochise College (AA); University of Arizona (BA, MA); Columbia University (MA, PhD)

Academic work
- Discipline: Sociologist
- Institutions: Stony Brook University

Musa al-Gharbi is an American sociologist. He is an assistant professor in the School of Communication and Journalism at Stony Brook University. He was the communications director of Heterodox Academy from 2016 to 2020.

Al-Gharbi is the author of the 2024 book We Have Never Been Woke: The Cultural Contradictions of a New Elite, a study of the history and political economy of the knowledge professions from the interwar period through the present, published by Princeton University Press.

== Early life and education ==
Al-Gharbi grew up in a middle-class family in Sierra Vista, Arizona, near the Mexico border. His family was heavily involved in the United States Army, with both his parents being soldiers. He had a twin brother who in 2010 was killed in the War in Afghanistan.

Al-Gharbi received an associate degree from Cochise Community College, then went on to receive a bachelor's degree in Near Eastern studies and a MA in philosophy at the University of Arizona. He graduated from Columbia University, earning a PhD in sociology in 2023.

== Career ==
In 2014, while teaching at the University of Arizona, al-Gharbi became a target of right-wing backlash after Fox News highlighted a Truthout article he wrote criticizing American policy in the Middle East.

It would not be a stretch to say that the United States is actually a greater threat to peace and stability in the region than ISIS – not least because US policies in Iraq, Libya and Syria have largely paved the way for ISIS's emergence as a major regional actor.

— Musa al-Gharbi, "How Much Moral High Ground Does the US Have Over ISIS?"

Numerous death threats were sent to the University of Arizona. Following the controversy, al-Gharbi was fired from his teaching position and denied entry into PhD programs at the University of Arizona. He turned to retail, selling shoes at a Dillard's store. He was refused a promotion to shoe department manager because a district manager thought he was overqualified. He was later admitted to Columbia University, where he completed a PhD in sociology. In 2016, after moving to New York City to attend Columbia, he took notice of a particular culture which he would later explore in his writing. On the Upper West Side, an area known for its progressive politics, he found a "racialised caste system" whose bottom tier consisted of a class of "disposable servants who will clean your house, watch your kids, walk your dogs, deliver prepared meals to you".

Al-Gharbi was the communications director of Heterodox Academy from 2016 to 2020. Since 2020, he has published columns in The Guardian.

In 2023, al-Gharbi became an assistant professor in the School of Communication and Journalism at Stony Brook University.

=== 2021 book release ===
In 2021, al-Gharbi's book We Have Never Been Woke: Social Justice Discourse, Inequality, and the Rise of a New Elite, was acquired by Princeton University Press. It was published in 2024. He argues in the book that the contemporary "woke" movement had not begun during the mid-2010s matriculation of Generation Z into college, but in 2011 during a surge in media discussions of various forms of prejudice and discrimination. He argues that contemporary American society is dominated by a professional class of "woke elites" he calls "symbolic capitalists", whom he describes as "professionals who traffic in symbols and rhetoric, images and narratives, data and analysis". According to him, these symbolic capitalists support social justice movements in order to amass social currency to further their own interests.

== Views ==
Since the election of Donald Trump in 2016, al-Gharbi has argued that mainstream liberal news outlets including The New York Times' opinion page and MSNBC have mischaracterized Trump's supporters. He views the 2024 election victory of Trump as a revolt against symbolic capitalists, with Kamala Harris being "a very prototypical symbolic capitalist".

== Personal life ==
Before attending college, al-Gharbi planned to become a Catholic priest. He later became an atheist and then converted to Islam.

Al-Gharbi is married to a woman from Lebanon.

== Selected works ==
=== Books ===
- Al-Gharbi, Musa (2024). We Have Never Been Woke: The Cultural Contradictions of a New Elite. Princeton University Press. ISBN 978-0-691-23260-7.

=== Articles ===
- Al-Gharbi, Musa (2018). "Race and the Race for the White House: On Social Research in the Age of Trump". The American Sociologist. 49 (4): 496–519. doi:10.1007/s12108-018-9373-5. ISSN 0003-1232.
- Smith, Benjamin K.; Stohl, Michael; al-Gharbi, Musa (2019). "Discourses on countering violent extremism: the strategic interplay between fear and security after 9/11". Critical Studies on Terrorism. 12 (1): 151–168. doi:10.1080/17539153.2018.1494793. ISSN 1753-9161.
- Rozado, David; al-Gharbi, Musa; Halberstadt, Jamin (2021). "Prevalence of Prejudice-Denoting Words in News Media Discourse: A Chronological Analysis". Social Science Computer Review. 41 (1): 99–122. doi:10.1177/08944393211031452. ISSN 0894-4393.
