= Models of disability =

Analytic tools in disability studies

Models of disability are analytic tools in disability studies used to articulate different ways disability is conceptualized by individuals and society broadly. Disability models are useful for understanding disagreements over disability policy, teaching people about ableism, providing disability-responsive health care, and articulating the life experiences of disabled people.

The most frequently discussed models are the medical model of disability, which views disablement as caused by medical disorders; and the social model of disability which instead views disablement being a result of societal exclusion and discrimination.

Different models can be combined: the medical model is frequently combined with the tragedy model, which views disability as a personal misfortune. Together they form hegemonic views of disability in Western society. Other models exist in direct opposition: the affirmation model, which views disability as a positive form of social identity, is inherently incompatible with the tragedy model.

Different models can be used to describe contrasting disabilities: for example, an autistic person who also has myalgic encephalomyelitis/chronic fatigue syndrome may view their autism through the affirmation model, but their ME/CFS through the medical model.

== Deficit-focused models ==
This category of models centre on different deficits held by disabled people, such as the medical model (a deficit in health) and the rehabilitation model (a deficit in employment).

=== Disability as a personal problem ===
==== Tragedy model ====
The tragedy model views disability as an individual's misfortune. It is one of the most dominant conceptualizations of disability in Western society. It is generally an individualistic view of disability: each disability is an individual, personal tragedy.

The tragedy model is criticized for being ableist; it is associated with the view that living with a disability is worse than death. In the tragedy model, pity is seen as an appropriate response to disability, and used to justify infanticide and other murders of disabled individuals. The tragedy model underlies the supercrip stereotype: if a disabled person is seen as thriving, it is because they did so in spite of their disability.

==== Charity model ====
The charity model positions disabled people as pitiable victims, and abled people who provide them with charity as beneficent saviours. This model is frequently combined with other deficit models, such as the tragedy and medical models.

This model is criticized by disabled people, as it centres the people who provide the charity, rather than those ostensibly being "helped". Disability acts as a means for abled people to feel good about themselves, through providing charity—without regard for whether this charity was wanted or effective.

==== Moral and religious models ====
The moral model of disability, also known as the religious model, views disability as a form of punishment for having a deficit in one's morality. In Judeo-Christian tradition, disability may be viewed as a punishment by God for having sinned; in Hindu tradition, disability may be understood as karma for misdeeds committed in one's past life. The moral model is characterized by a distrust of disabled individuals.

The moral model is frequently seen regarding disabilities where individuals' actions may have contributed to acquiring the disability, such as AIDS, type 2 diabetes, obesity, and addiction. Concerning addictions, the moral model is often contrasted with the medical model: addiction is less likely to be seen as a moral failing if one understands it instead as an involuntary, medical condition.

=== Expert/Professional models of disability ===
In the expert or professional model of disability, disability is a problem that requires expert professionals to identify and then prescribe a series of interventions. This model produces a power dynamic where an abled, authoritarian service provider acts on behalf of a passive, disabled client. At its extreme, disabled people are given no authority or autonomy over their care or everyday life. It has been described as a fixer/fixee relationship.

==== Medical model ====
The medical model, also known as the normalization model, views disability as a medical disorder, in need of treatment and ultimately cure. Its endpoint is a world where disability no longer exists, as all disabilities have been "cured".

In the medical model, physicians are the primary authorities on disability. It is categorized as a deficit model, as it views disability as a deficit in health. It is also categorized as an individualistic model, in that disablement is a result of each individual's body/mind. The medical model has been heavily critiqued by the disability community, as many disabled people do not wish to be cured, and reject the deficit framing.

==== Rehabilitation and functional limitations models ====
The rehabilitation model, also known as the functional limitations model, aims to "rehabilitate" disability through alterations both to the disabled individual and their environment. Like the medical model, it is categorized both as an individualistic model and as a deficit model, but instead of a deficit in health it is a deficit in employment. Unlike the medical model, the rehabilitation model does not aim to alter the underlying cause of a person's impairment; the focus instead is on functional capacity.

Unlike the medical model and the eugenic model, the goal is not to eliminate disability. The desired endpoint instead is to minimize the effects of disability in society. This model expects disabled people to conform as much as possible to society. Similar to the medical model, it places rehabilitation experts as the authorities on disability, rather than disabled people.

===== Technological model =====
The technological model, also known as disability technoscience, aims to reduce the effect of disability through technological means. It is a subtype of the rehabilitation model which focuses specifically on how technology can reduce functional limitations. Unlike the rehabilitation model, it positions engineers and designers as the authorities on disability.

This model has been criticized by disability advocates for expecting disabled people to need complex, expensive technologies rather than implement changes in society. For example, why design a costly and likely unsafe "stair-climbing wheelchair" when instead building codes should be changed so ramps and elevators are provided? In their Crip Technoscience Manifesto, scholars Hamraie and Fritsch further critique the implication "that disabled people are not already making, hacking, and tinkering with existing material arrangements".

==== Biopsychosocial model ====
The biopsychosocial model of health

The biopsychosocial model was developed by mental health practitioners to recognize how the interactions between biological, psychological, and social factors can influence the outcome of any given medical condition.

The model has been critiqued by both disability and medical communities as the psychological element is often overemphasized in clinical practice. For example, the biopsychosocial model has been used by physicians to dismiss myalgic encephalomyelitis and medically unexplained symptoms as psychosomatic in nature without adequate investigation to somatic causes nor consideration of social determinants of health.

Disability advocates have criticized the biopsychosocial model as victim-blaming. According to Inclusion London, the biopsychosocial model treats the primary cause of unemployment amongst disabled people not due to workplace discrimination but instead due to the disabled individuals themselves having negative attitudes and behaviours about work. If a disabled person becomes depressed because they repeatedly encounter workplace discrimination, and stop applying for jobs, the biopsychosocial model places the onus on the disabled person for not having tried hard enough.

=== Disability as a collective problem ===
==== Economic model ====
The economic model understands disability as a deficit to the economy. The model uses the lens of economic analysis to quantify the effect of disability on economic productivity, such as through the Disability-adjusted life year. The value of a disabled person is hence reduced to their ability to contribute to capitalism, and is criticized for being dehumanizing and disconnected from the broader sociological forces.

It is similar to the rehabilitation model for its focus on how disability prevents people from working. However, where the rehabilitation model focuses on qualitative, social functioning; the economic model focuses on quantitative, financial impact.

Although the economic model can be applied on an individual basis, the financial impact of disability is more often evaluated with respect to employers and nation-states. Indeed, this model is often invoked in policy-making in Western countries.

==== Bureaucratic and compliance models ====
The bureaucratic model of disability, also known as the compliance model, treats disability as a question of legal compliance for institutions. Disabled people are understood deserving of special exceptions to rules, but only if the disabled person has the exact requisite paperwork to prove their worthiness.

The end goal of this model is to shield institutions from legal liability. Disabled people are hence seen as a deficit in rule-following. This model is used by disability advocates to criticize how bureaucratic accommodations for disabled people are often one-size-fits-all, rigid, ineffective, and inaccessible to many who need them.

==== Eugenic model ====
The eugenic model argues that the human race should take an active role in selectively breeding for desirable physical and mental characteristics. In the eugenic model, people are categorized as fit or unfit. Its end goal is a population composed solely of those who are "fit", and has been used as justification for mass-sterilization and mass-murder of those seen as unfit.

In the eugenic model, disability is not merely an individual deficit but a threat to the collective gene pool. Eugenic thought was built upon a misunderstanding of evolution: genetic variation is important for a species' evolution and resilience. In contrast, the evolutionary model understands disability as contributing positively to the gene pool.

Disability activists and scholars stress that eugenic thought remains alive and active in society. For example, the COVID-19 pandemic brought to light how common it is for abled people to see disabled lives as expendable, such as through the common refrain that "only the old and sick will die" and medical rationing policies that explicitly discriminate against disabled people.

Similar reports are found of disabled people treated as expendable with regard to climate change and disaster preparedness, and have been termed "Climate Darwinism". Certain environmentalist discourses which focus on fixing "overpopulation" (rather than over-consumption) are criticized for often implying the "solution" is to rid the world of degenerate (disabled) people.

== Models in opposition to disability as deficit ==
=== Structural models ===
==== Affirmation and identity models ====
The affirmation model, also known as the affirmative model and the identity model, centres the benefits of being disabled. It is a direct rejection of the tragedy model of disability. This model was developed by disabled people and positions disabled people as authorities on disability.

The concept of Deaf Gain refers to how losing one's hearing also gains one a place in the Deaf community. Many Deaf people take pride in Deaf culture and the unique features of signed languages.

Similarly, the so called "Neurodiversity" movement has advanced an affirmative model of disabilities such as Autism. Many autistic people view their autism positively and claim to not be in need of cure. Events such as Autistic Pride Day celebrate autism as a positive identity.

The end goal of the affirmation model is a world where disabled people have a collective identity which is a source of positive self-image and pride.

==== Social model ====
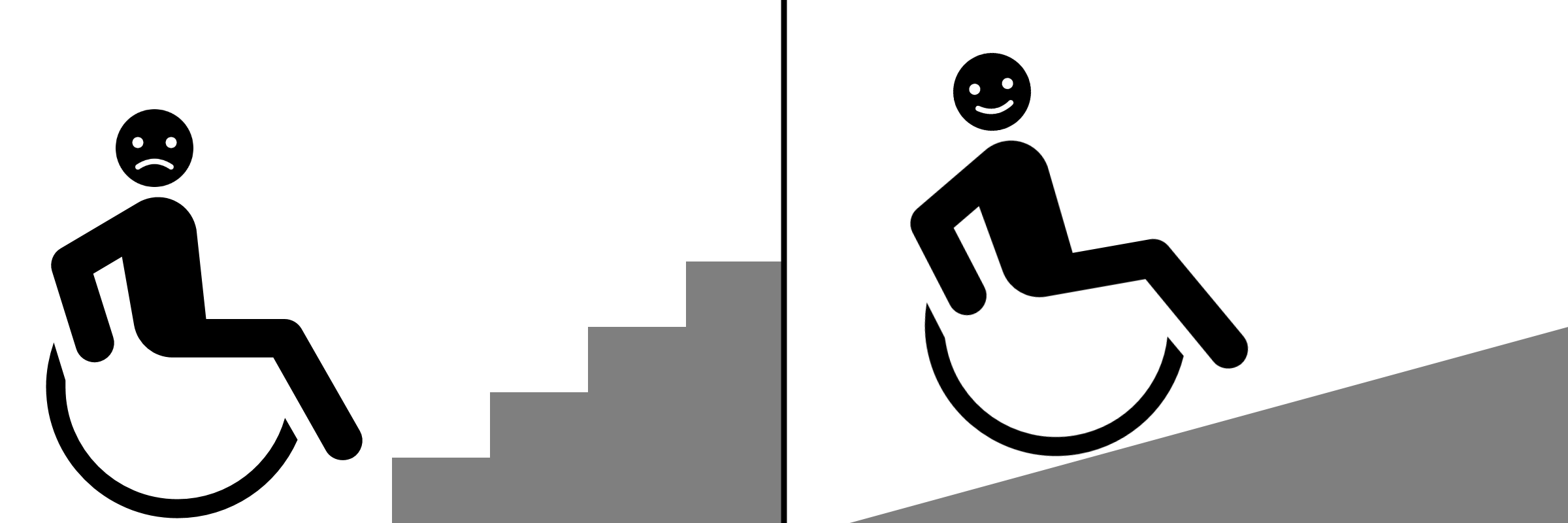
A wheelchair user's problems being caused by an inaccessible environment

The social model views disablement as being caused by societal ableism. Disability is differentiated from impairment: impairment is the physical limits of one's bodymind, whereas disability is caused by society. For example, being born unable to hear is an impairment. But what is actually disabling is that society does not widely use any signed languages, and transcription/captioning are often unavailable.

In a social environment where using a signed language is ubiquitous, deafness stops being disabling. Prior to colonization, many Native American cultures routinely used signed languages such as Plains Indian Sign Language, and did not have a conceptualization of disability which included deafness.

The social model is usually contrasted directly with the medical model of disability. Whereas the medical model views disability as a problem caused within the individual, the social model views disability as a problem with the society in which the individual lives. The social model, like the affirmation model, was created by disabled activists.

The end goal of the social model is a world where disabled people enjoy unrestricted social participation. All barriers for disabled participation have been removed through universal design in the built environment, widespread use of signed languages, Universal Design for Learning in teaching, universal access to support workers who are paid fair wages, and so on.

The social model has been criticized for being overly reductionist. Some disabilities, such as ME/CFS, involve physical pain or fatigue, and as such do not neatly fit in the conventional social model of disability.

==== Human rights model ====
The human rights model, also known as the rights model, views disabled people as inherently worthy of human rights and dignity. Disabled people should have the same rights as every one else in society, and should have legal protections from discrimination. It is contrasted with the charity model. With its focus on personal liberties, rights, and autonomy, this model is rooted in philosophical liberalism.

The human rights model has been criticized as it focuses on reforming the existing social system, rather than enacting fundamental social change. For example, the human rights model aims to prevent legal discrimination in disabled people owning private property, and does not question the legitimacy of land ownership in settler colonial nations.

The human rights model aims for disabled individuals to have complete autonomy over decisions affecting their lives. Unlike the social model, the human rights model recognizes that some disabled people experience chronic pain and/or fatigue that they wish to have treated or cured. The human rights model asserts all disabled people have a right to patient-centred medical treatment which respects their bodily autonomy, and respects that some disabled people may use this right to have their disability cured.

=== Poststructural models ===
==== Cultural and social construction models ====
The cultural model of disability, also known as the social construction model and the critical disability studies (CDS) model, understands both disability and impairment as categories generated by academic knowledge, cultural media, and everyday discourse. This model focuses on the social forces which shape and reinforce the category of "disability". This model uses a post-structural sociocultural lens to examine how the boundaries of disability shift across cultures and times. Its end goal is to decode and deconstruct the unstated assumptions about disability.

Unlike the social model, the cultural model views both "impairment" and "disability" as social constructions—and troubles the idea that these concepts may be easily separated.

==== Radical model ====
In the radical model, disability as a category is socially constructed, and was created for the purposes of capitalism and white supremacy. The radical model acknowledges that disabled people do not, in practice, control the definition of disability, and so "disability" is anyone who has been identified by the relevant political powers as disabled.

The radical model, like the cultural model, pays attention to the social forces that shape the category of disability. It also views "impairment" and "disability" to be equally socially constructed. The radical model focuses on the intersectional aspects of how disability is socially constructed. For example, how the modern concept of intelligence was created by race science to position Black people as inherently feeble-minded and hence disabled. Which in turn is important for understanding how special education in the United States was expanded after Brown v. Board of Education as a means to maintain racial school segregation.

The radical model posits that disability cannot be neatly separated from other categories of oppression such as class, race, ethnicity, sexual orientation, and gender. It shifts the focus from disability rights to disability justice.

The radical model posits there is nothing inherently wrong with disabled people: Deaf people are a linguistic minority, certain groups of disabled people think differently, people with mobility disabilities move differently, et cetera.

The end goal of the radical model is a world without kyriarchy. The radical model is explicitly anti-capitalist, anti-racist, anti-colonial, feminist, and queer liberationist. Politically it is often associated with socialism and anarchism.

== Other models ==
Not all models of disability can be easily categorized as deficit or anti-deficit models. For example, postcolonial critiques of disability studies reject a tidy division between deficit thinking (ableist) and anti-deficit thinking (anti-ableist). In Global South countries where disability is often a result of violence, war, and environmental racism, disability advocacy needs to be understood through different frameworks.

=== Disability as caused by violence ===
==== Debility model ====
The debility model of disability creates a distinction between disability and debility. Debility refers to a process of slowly being worn out, whereas disability is characterized by a clear before-and-after. The concept of debility is used to foreground how colonial powers will subjugate their colonized populations through a chronic state of minority stress.

For example, the colonization of Canada involved the debilitation of the Indigenous population through the Canadian Indian residential school system, the epidemic of Missing and Murdered Indigenous Women, the chronic under-funding of health care for Indigenous populations, the lack of safe drinking water on many reservations, chronic food insecurity, and environmental racism.

Whereas models like the social model and affirmation model push against the idea that disability is a misfortune and should be prevented, debility creates space to talk about how disability caused by war and similar violence in the Global South is devastating and ought to be prevented.

Like the radical model, the debility model is rooted in intersectional theory. The debility model provides a strong contrast to the rehabilitation and economic models: nation-states, rather than being concerned with minimizing disability, will instead maximize disability as a means of social control.

==== Eco-social model ====
The eco-social model of disability views disablement as a result of social-environmental factors which occur prior to birth. For example, disablement due to prenatal exposure to environmental toxins such as lead. While these pollutants come from the physical environment, it is understood that social forces are ultimately why the environmental toxins were present/exposed.

The eco-social model is contrasted with the social model, which understands disabling social forces as those which impact living, grown disabled individuals. Unlike the social model, the eco-social model advocates for the precautionary principle in environmental stewardship.

Similar to the debility model, the eco-social model is used to advocate for reducing preventable disabilities in the Global South, such as from war, and unregulated toxic industries. Unlike debility, eco-social disabilities can be acquired in life-altering events, such as through preventable motor-vehicle collisions that occur as a result of unsafe transport systems.

==== Minority and political models ====
The political model, also known as the (oppressed) minority model, and the sociopolitical model, conceives disabled people as a minority group which experience systemic oppression (ableism). Disabled people are hence understood as a rights-seeking group similar to LGBT people and immigrants. This model is often combined with other non-deficit models such as the affirmation model and the social model.

The minority model focuses on combating discrimination. The minority model calls for targeted policies that protect and/or benefit people who are classified as disabled. As such, it is considered in direct opposition to the universal model. Its end goal, similar to the human rights model, includes sociolegal protections and benefits for disabled people. But unlike the human rights model, it also concerns social psychological aspects, such as social stigma.

Although the minority model emerged as an extension of the social model, the minority model takes no stance on whether disability is a deficit or not. For example, one can understand chronically ill people through the medical model while also seeing them as a political minority which experiences discrimination. As such, it has been criticized by disability advocates for supporting the stereotype that disabled people are victims in need of external support.

The minority model allows for the causes of disability to be multifactorial and includes environmental, societal, and legal dimensions. Rather than focusing on why or how people are disabled, this model focuses on ending the discrimination faced by disabled people.

===== Eco-crip model =====
The environmental justice model of disability, also known as eco-crip theory, understand disabled people as uniquely vulnerable to climate change and other changes to the physical environment. For example, exposure to poor air quality due to frequent forest fires will disproportionately affect those with respiratory conditions; emergency evacuation plans often fail to ensure people with mobility disabilities are able to evacuate.

This model was developed in direct opposition to eco-ableist ideas that disability is unnatural and destructive - and hence that disabled are in opposition to environmentalism. Instead, eco-crip theory positions disabled people as beneficial to the environmental movement: increased sensitivity to changing environmental conditions means that disabled people act as "canaries in the coal mine".

=== Models attempting to naturalize disability ===
==== Universal and continuum models ====
The universal model rejects the dichotomy between disabled and nondisabled. The continuum model, posits there is instead a continuum from disabled to non-disabled. Disability is positioned as an inevitable part of ageing. And the entire population is at risk of disability: everyone is one unexpected injury or illness away from becoming disabled. As a result, everyone should be concerned with disability discrimination.

As a corollary to the continuum model comes the idea that "everyone is a little disabled". This is advanced as a means for abled people to develop empathy and solidarity with disabled people, as well as to demystify and destigmatize disability.

The universal model, similar to the social and technological models, advocates for universal design. However, there is an emphasis on the curb cut effect, where designing for disability also benefits nondisabled populations (e.g. adding a ramp to a building for wheelchair users also benefits parents with strollers).

A related framing, the limits model, treats disability as an embodied form of "limitness". All humans experience some level of limitation in their lives, and this should be seen as mundane rather than a deficit. The limits model aims to reconceptualize limitation as an important part of the human experience.

==== Customer/Empowering model ====
The customer/empowering model, also known as the independent living model, advocates for disabled people to be in charge of their own care and life decisions. It exists in direct opposition to the expert/professional model: instead of experts dictating the lives of disabled people, they should instead act as professional advisors and providers of resources.

Its end goal is for disabled people and their families to decide for themselves whether they want treatment and what services they wish to benefit from. It advocates for a shift in how professionals interact with disabled people.

Like the minority model, it does not take a stance on whether disability is a deficit. Historically, this model has often been combined with the social model, but can be combined with other models such as the medical model.

==== Evolutionary models ====
In sickle cell disease, those with the recessive allele (r) inherit a resistance to malaria. People with two recessive alleles (shown in red) are affected by sickle cell disease. The purple unaffected carriers receive the benefit without being affected by the disease.

The evolutionary model, also known as the rainbow model, values disability as it contributes to genetic diversity. Evolution by natural selection depends on genetic variation; greater genetic diversity increases collective resilience in response to disease and changing climactic conditions. This model is in direct opposition to the eugenic model.

In the evolutionary model, hereditary disabilities which are more common than the basal mutation rate of one in a million persist evolutionarily because they provide enough benefit to offset their downsides. For example, ostensibly harmful diseases may persist due to balancing selection; a well-studied example is how sickle cell disease confers a genetic resistance to malaria. The Hunter versus farmer hypothesis is a proposed explanation for the common prevalence of attention deficit hyperactivity disorder.

Some disability-associated traits may have specialized benefits. For example, Delayed sleep phase disorder, a condition where a person's circadian rhythm is substantially shifted from societal norms, may be an evolutionary advantage to ensure that there is always someone awake to keep guard during the night.

The evolutionary model views disability as a natural part of humanity. Like the affirmation model, it recognizes that disability can be beneficial. However, unlike the affirmation model it assess benefit on a population-level: sickle-cell disease is harmful to those with the disease, but beneficial to their heterozygous relatives.
