= Ohio State University Libraries =

University libraries located on the Ohio State University campuses

The Ohio State University Libraries are the collective academic libraries of the Ohio State University and its regional campuses. This system welcomes Ohio State faculty, students, visiting scholars and the general public to study and research. It includes ten libraries located on the Columbus campus, six libraries on the regional campus of the university and nine special collections. The Ohio State University Libraries offer educational resources and services to support readers to research, learn and teach. They can help researchers find and borrow physical and digital materials from articles, journals, databases, books, dissertations, theses, newspapers, streaming videos and images, etc. The Ohio State University Libraries hold over six million volumes in traditional library formats and more in electronic information resources.

== History ==
In 1893, the Ohio State University built the Orton Hall Library, the first library at this university. It holds over 200,000 geologic and topographic maps.

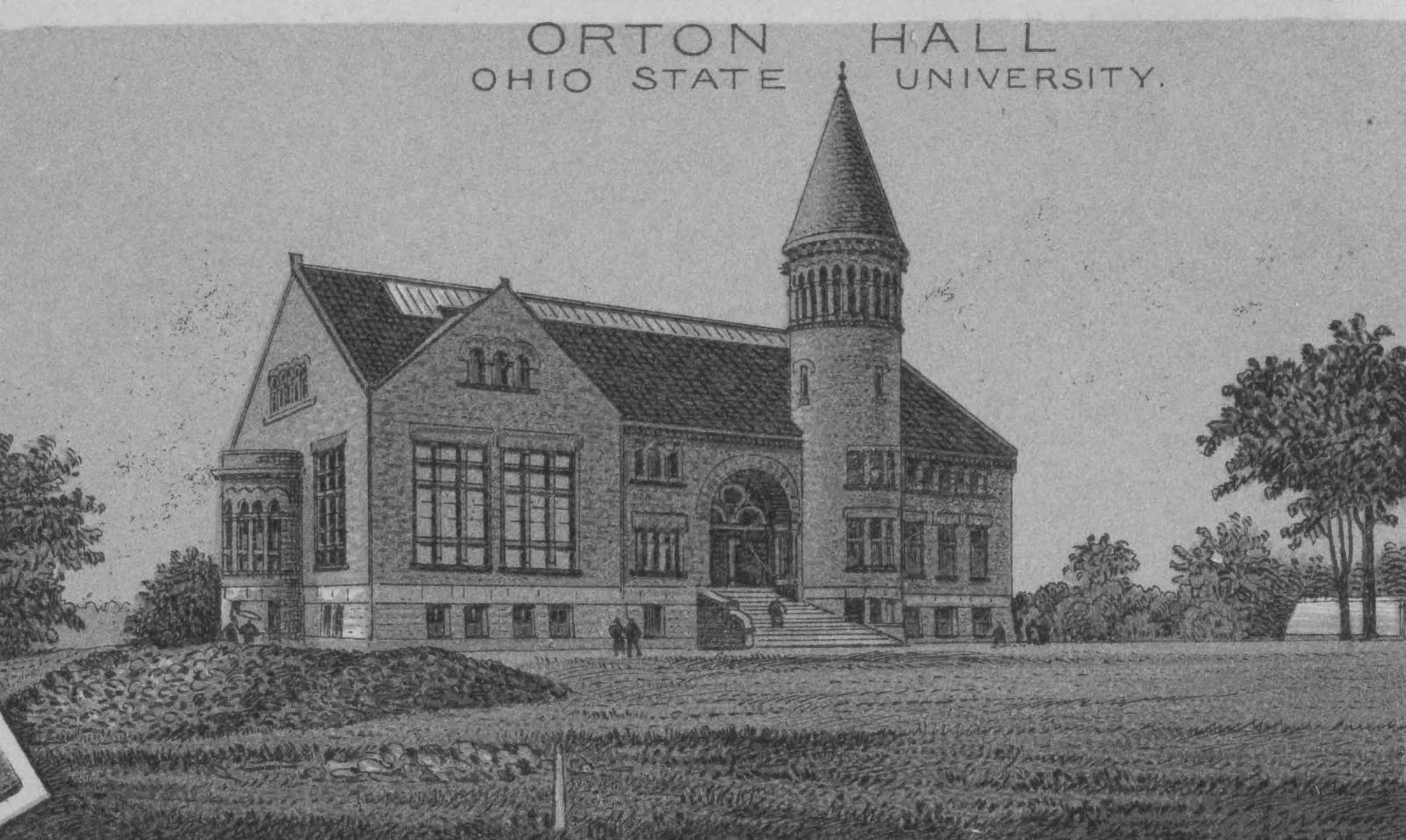
The picture of the first library in the Ohio State University

The largest library in the system is the Thompson Library. It locates at the very centre of the Columbus campus. Serving readers for several decades till the late 1990s, this library had some intolerable troubles, especially in storing space and furnishings. To a report from the University faculty committee and Brit Kirwan (the new University President at that time) in 1998, the Ohio State University decided to start the renovation of the Thompson Library at the very beginning of the 21st century. The renovation cost over $100 million with a two-year feasibility study and a three-year design phase.

=== Space ===
The number of collections in the Ohio State University Libraries increased rapidly and caused storage issues. The Ohio State University Libraries tried the designed facility to operate high-density off-site book storage and used the new technology of sophisticated climate control systems to extend the life of stored collections. With the progress, there is more space to create learning places for readers. In some sections of the Ohio State University Libraries, readers are able to have 24/7 services and study space.

=== Librarians ===
The staff working in the Ohio State University Libraries are qualified and experienced. During the five-year renovation, the library management decided to improve its service. The university used a training program and clear communication to help staff change their previous responsibility, reduce cataloguing backlogs, understand their new responsibility and improve their ability to manage the library. All staff are knowledgeable to help readers find the direction in a complex information landscape.

The Ohio State University Libraries started renovation again in the autumn of 2006 which aimed to repair the damaged state of the building due to the several previous renovations. During the renovation, staff changed their offices and most of the collections in the Thompson Library were relocated to other libraries. The Ackerman Library opened after the day the Thompson Library closed to continue the main service.

=== Communication and Service ===
The Thompson Library of Ohio State University did not open till 2009 due to a three-year renovation in 2006. The Ohio State University Libraries found that the library environment was changing mainly because of the development of the Internet. During this period, the Ohio State University Libraries used Web 2.0, blogs, wikis, podcasts, Carmen, and many other new methods to serve and communicate with readers. The digital initiatives include all collections in the Ohio State University Libraries that support storing, sharing, and learning knowledge.

==== WEB 2.0 ====
The web is increasingly popular as a method for information searching, so the Ohio State University Libraries decided to engage in the web environment. This helps the libraries to be more convenient and attractive for readers. After having the web, the Ohio State University Libraries started to use blogs to record daily information and events in early 2005. This is a convenient one-way communication tool for readers and staff to get the information they want.

The Ohio State University Libraries’ website is a collaborative effort between University Marketing and a variety of campus communications partners. It provides relevant and timely information to over 100,000 unique online users per week. The homepage of the website works via a visual identity system, providing common web templates and graphic elements to increase accessibility for searching and reading.

==== Blogs ====
The University Libraries' Diversity & Inclusion Committee created a blog to promote the Tuesdays @ Thompson speaker series for spring semester 2015. In support of the program's first event on human trafficking, the committee used Tableau, a tool for data analysis, to create an interactive visualization for this blog. This visualization was made by extracting human trafficking subject headings from the library catalogers and importing them into Tableau. A title, a byline, and instructions were then added to create a fully interactive visualization.

=== Service for special users ===
Since 1975, the Ohio State University Libraries have served as a type of reference centre for the visually handicapped in Sullivant Hall. With a donation from the Class of 1973 and a grant from the Ohio Rehabilitation Services Commission, Library Services for the Physically Impaired (LSPI), formerly known as the Library for the Blind, was founded. Visual magnifiers, a typewriter that could output papers in Braille and another that wrote in gigantic print, and audio devices like tape recorders were also given by LSPI. It provided the required resources for students with visual impairments with a selective browsing collection of books and magazines in audio, Braille, and large print, including Reader's Digest and Newsweek.

In 1981, the Ohio State University Libraries moved LSPI to a better space in Thompson Library with a new machine that could scan and read aloud almost any printed page.

The Student Life Disability Services office now oversees programs and projects for students with disabilities, including visually impaired library services.

== Link the readers and the Ohio State University Libraries ==
Librarians are trained to have the ability to use the latest technology. They also learned ways how to support their readers. There is a research service by the Ohio State University Libraries for readers to connect with the university’s network.

=== Faculty ===
The Ohio State University Libraries keep in touch with instructors and students in the university to provide guidelines for education. Instructors in the Ohio State University can ask for help from librarians in the Ohio State University Libraries to find suitable teaching materials through the traditional way and a new one. Moreover, subject librarians and staff are fluent in more than 25 languages to assist readers. This means the librarians can not only figure out the specific materials the instructor wants, but also provide materials to help courses be more interesting and attractive to different kinds of students. The Ohio State University Libraries create partnerships with many academic websites to support affordable educational resources for instructors to help improve their courses. The learning management system Carmen provides resources for instructors which give basic information and help them start preparing for the courses.

=== Students ===
There is a learning management system called Carmen, supported by the Ohio State University Libraries, which provides digital materials for students at the Ohio State University to study and research. The Ohio State University Libraries collect and analyze students’ assessments to develop the courses with this system. Besides, the Ohio State University Libraries take action to help and serve students to decrease the financial pressure by providing e-books and streaming media for them. This solves the problem for students who may not be possible to afford course materials. The libraries had an increasing number of partners and ventures to support students in savings and provide the best options possible to instructors and their students. There are various events held in the Ohio State University Libraries every week to provide opportunities for students to study further.

=== The Ohio State University ===
There is a close connection between the great librarians in the Ohio State University Libraries and the development of the Ohio State University. The university helped the staff in the libraries change opinions and improve their ability to keep in step with the Times. The libraries help their readers to gain knowledge more conveniently. The Carmen system gathers instructors, students and the university to help each other and step further. The Ohio State University Libraries can be viewed as “tools” for the Ohio State University to learn, educate and improve.

== Columbus campus libraries ==
- William Oxley Thompson Memorial Library
- 18th Avenue Library
  - Research Commons
- Architecture Library
- Biological Sciences/Pharmacy Library
- Fine Arts Library
- FAES Library & Student Success Center
- Geology Library
- Health Sciences Library/Prior Hall
- Law Library
- Music & Dance Library
- Veterinary Medicine Library

== Additional regional libraries ==
- Lima
- Mansfield
- Marion
- Newark
- Wooster ATI
- Wooster OARDC

== Special collection libraries ==
Special Collections at Ohio State University Libraries collect, protect, and promote the use of unique collections, primary research materials, and uncommon resources. Faculty and students at Ohio State University, as well as visiting scholars and the general public, can use various collections. These collections are the premiere international studies collections in the state of Ohio, including resources that support the university’s international studies centre as well as Ohio State’s languages, literature, and cultures departments.

=== Billy Ireland Cartoon Library & Museum ===
The Billy Ireland Cartoon Library & Museum is the world's largest and most extensive academic study centre dedicated to editorial cartoons, comic strips, comic books, graphic novels, and manga.

=== Byrd Polar and Climate Research Center Archival Program ===
This program offers unique material recording polar exploration and scientific study, such as records of explorers, scientists, and polar research organizations, available for research and educational purposes.

=== Hilandar Research Library ===
The Hilandar Research Library holds the world's biggest microform collection of medieval Slavic Cyrillic manuscripts. The Ohio State University Libraries and the Resource Center for Medieval Slavic Studies collaborated to create the library.

=== Jerome Lawrence and Robert E. Lee Theatre Research Institute ===
This theatre research institute gathers, preserves, documents, and makes accessible resources that illuminate American performing arts culture and history for study and education through the Department of Theatre.

=== Medical Heritage Center ===
The Medical Heritage Center maintains, promotes, teaches, and celebrates central Ohio's health care past as a crucial basis for the health sciences' future.

=== The Ohio Public Policy Archives ===
The Ohio State University Libraries and the John Glenn School of Public Affairs collaborated to create the Ohio Public Policy Archives (known as the Ohio Congressional Archives until October 2020) in 2004 to expand on Senator John Glenn's papers.

=== Rare Books and Manuscripts Library ===
Primary-source materials and associated published works from the medieval period through current literature and the arts are accessible for advanced study and research in the Rare Books and Manuscripts Library.

=== University Archives ===
The Ohio State University Archives aims to serve as the university's official memory. This archive identifies, protects, and makes available to the university documents and documentation of current and historical worth.

== Publications ==
=== Building Healthy Academic Communities Journal ===
Building Healthy Academic Communities Journal
- Language: English

Publication details
- Publisher: Ohio State University Libraries (United States)

Standard abbreviations
- ISO 4: Build. Healthy Acad. Communities J.

Indexing
- ISSN: 2573-7643

=== Disability Studies Quarterly ===
Disability Studies Quarterly
- Language: English

Publication details
- Publisher: Ohio State University Libraries, on behalf of the Society for Disability Studies (United States)

Standard abbreviations
- ISO 4: Disabil. Stud. Q.

Indexing
- ISSN: 1041-5718 (print); 2159-8371 (web)

Links
- Journal homepage

Disability Studies Quarterly is published on behalf of the Society for Disability Studies.

=== Empirical Musicology Review ===
Empirical Musicology Review
- Discipline: Musicology
- Language: English
- Edited by: Daniel Müllensiefen, Daniel Shanahan

Publication details
- History: 2006–present
- Publisher: Ohio State University Libraries (United States)
- Open access: Yes
- License: Creative Commons Attribution

Standard abbreviations
- ISO 4: Empir. Musicol. Rev.

Indexing
- ISSN: 1559-5749

Links
- Journal homepage

Empirical Musicology Review is a peer-reviewed open-access academic journal concerned with empirical musicology. It was established in 2006 and is published by the Ohio State University Libraries. The editors-in-chief are Daniel Müllensiefen and Daniel Shanahan. David Butler was the founding editor.

=== The International Journal of Screendance ===
The International Journal of Screendance
- Language: English

Publication details
- Publisher: Ohio State University Libraries (United States)

Standard abbreviations
- ISO 4: Int. J. Screendance

Indexing
- ISSN: 2154-6878 (print); 2154-6894 (web)

=== The Journal of Undergraduate Research at Ohio State ===
The Journal of Undergraduate Research at Ohio State
- Language: English

Publication details
- Publisher: Ohio State University Libraries (United States)

Standard abbreviations
- ISO 4: J. Undergrad. Res. Ohio State

Indexing
- ISSN: 2164-7704

=== Ohio Journal of School Mathematics ===
Ohio Journal of School Mathematics
- Language: English

Publication details
- Publisher: Ohio State University Libraries (United States)

Standard abbreviations
- ISO 4: Ohio J. Sch. Math.

Indexing
- ISSN: 2472-5986 (print); 2472-601X (web)

=== The Ohio Journal of Science ===
The Ohio Journal of Science
- Language: English

Publication details
- Publisher: Ohio State University Libraries (United States)

Standard abbreviations
- ISO 4: Ohio J. Sci.

Indexing
- ISSN: 0030-0950 (print); 2471-9390 (web)
