= Peter Beresford =

British academic, writer, researcher and activist

- Born: Peter Beresford; May 1, 1945 (age 81)
- Education: University College, Oxford
- Occupations: academic, writer, researcher, activist
- Years active: 1968–present
- Notable work: The Antidote (2025); The Future of Social Care (2024); Participatory Ideology: From Exclusion to Involvement (2021); All Our Welfare: Towards Participatory Social Policy (2016); Citizen Involvement: A Practical Guide for Change (1993); Whose Welfare? Private Care or Public Services (1986)
- Title: Visiting Professor, East Anglia University Emeritus Professor of Citizen Participation, University of Essex Emeritus Professor of Social Policy, Brunel University London
- Spouse: Suzy Croft (m. 1976)

Peter Beresford OBE, FAcSS, FRSA (born 1 May 1945) is a British academic, writer, researcher and activist best known for his work in the field of citizen participation and user involvement, areas of study he helped to create and develop. He is currently visiting professor and senior research fellow in the School of Health & Social Sciences at the University of East Anglia, emeritus professor of citizen participation at the University of Essex and emeritus professor of social policy at Brunel University London. Much of his work has centred on including the viewpoints, lived experience and knowledge of disabled people, mental health and other long term service users in public policy, practice and learning, and working for a more participatory politics.

== Biography ==
=== Childhood and Education ===
Peter Beresford was born in Frensham, Surrey. After his father died when he was four, he moved to Battersea where he attended school at Wix's Lane Primary School, Battersea and then Emanuel School London, before it became fee-paying. He was awarded an 'Open Exhibition' to University College, Oxford, where from 1964 to 1967 he studied Modern History. In 1968 he wrote a dissertation on homeless single people as part of a diploma in social and administrative studies at Barnet House, Oxford University and subsequently did research on vagrancy in Britain. He was awarded a PhD on Citizen Involvement in Public Policy by Middlesex University in 1997.

=== Personal life ===
Peter Beresford married Suzy Croft in 1976. They have worked and written together since that time. She was senior social worker at St John's Hospice, London, until 2016, and subsequently a welfare rights worker. They have four daughters. He is also a member of the BSA (motorcycle) Owners Club and has an ex-WD BSA M20 despatch rider's bike.

== Life and work ==
Between 1975 and 1977 Beresford was lecturer in Social Administration at Lancaster University, but left because of his growing concerns about the non-participatory nature of public policy. He was appointed part-time senior lecturer in Social Policy at the West London Institute for Higher Education (WLIHE) in 1990. WLIHE was absorbed into Brunel University London where he was promoted to Professor of Social Policy in 1997.

Together he and his partner, Suzy Croft, established a local community project, Battersea Community Action, in 1978 and a national initiative, the Open Services Project, in 1987. Each of these were participatory projects concerned with advancing the theory, policy and practice of participation through the production of publications, pamphlets and developmental and participatory research. In 1997, he founded and began directing the first UK Centre for Citizen Participation at Brunel University London.

A major theme of Beresford's work has been the participation of people as members of the public, workers, patients and service users in their lives, communities, society, politics and in policy and services affecting them. Much of his work has focused on advancing public participation, and the inclusive involvement and empowerment of long term users of health and social care. He is a pioneer of a new participatory approach to social policy as both discipline and public policy based on inclusive public involvement, sustainability and valuing diversity. He has long term personal experience of using mental health services and also of the welfare benefits system. This resulted in his close involvement in the disabled people's and psychiatric system survivors movements. He is also actively involved in Disability Studies and Mad Studies.

Beresford's theoretical policy and practical concern has been how disabled people and other long term health and social care service users can be equally involved in society and have an effective voice in their lives. This focus has resulted in the exploration of new approaches to occupational practice, policy formation, research and evaluation and the political process. It has also extended to the development of new approaches to epistemology which highlight the role of service users' lived experience as a knowledge source. His illustrated pamphlet 'It's Our Lives' anticipated subsequent discussion of 'epistemic injustice' and highlighted the way in which the devaluing of experiential knowledge added another layer of discrimination to that already facing groups experiencing oppression and marginalization.

Beresford was also co-founder and chair (and subsequently co-chair) of Shaping Our Lives, the independent, national disabled people's and service users' organisation and network that is committed to improving the quality of support available to service users and increasing their say and control over their lives. Shaping Our Lives has pioneered the development of user involvement in professional education and also of user controlled research. It has been the UK partner of PowerUs, an international partnership to take forward this work. In March 2020 Shaping Our Lives was awarded £197,448 by the Big Lottery Community Fund to develop the Inclusive Involvement Movement over four years. Its aim is to promote the voice of different equality groups who use health and social care services, and other services provided by the public and voluntary sectors to advance the involvement of disabled people and other marginalized groups. It carried out this work in parallel to a partnership research project with King's College London supported by the Economic and Social Research Council (ESRC), exploring the principles of Nobel Prize Winner Elinor Ostrom's for collaborative working.

He has been a trustee of the Social Care Institute for Excellence, the National Skills Academy for Social Care and Skills For Care as well as being a member of government advisory groups and committees. He was appointed an Officer of the Order of the British Empire in the 2008 New Year's honours list, 'for services to social care'. He was appointed Fellow of the Academy of the Social Sciences in 2006. He is emeritus professor at Brunel University London, visiting professor at Edge Hill University and the University of East Anglia and Fellow of the School of Social Care Research. From December 2015 until July 2020, he was professor of citizen participation at the University of Essex. He was an Executive Editor of the leading disability peer-reviewed journal, Disability & Society until 2019. In July 2017, Beresford was awarded the Honorary Degree of Doctor of Science (Hon.D.Sc.) by Edge Hill University ''in recognition of his distinguished academic and professional career within the fields of social work, social policy and citizen participation". He was awarded the title of 'Adjunct Professor in Citizen Participation and User Involvement' at the University of Southern Denmark in May 2021.

His work at UEA has focused on the participatory theme of the National Institute for Health Research (NIHR) Applied Research Collaboration (ARC) programme 2019-2024, a government funded health and care research programme.

His latest book explores the reasons for the rise and perpetuation of increasingly destructive international neoliberal politics and contrasts this with the emergence of New Social Movements (NSMs), highlighting how the personal values, roles and relationships associated with the latter may offer an effective route out of the former.

== Awards ==
Beresford is identified as an award-winning leader in social work and social care:

- He was voted 2nd for social care in poll of the "Top 100 people in Health and Social Care" in 2005.
- He has been identified as one of the "Power 100 Britain's Most Influential People with a Disability or Impairment" by the Shaw Trust in 2015 and 2016, identified as one of disabled academic
- He is identified as the 2nd most influential person in social care for adults and 9th overall in a Community Care survey of the "Top 20 Most Influential People in Social Care". Beresford's work was described as 'extremely useful and inspirational'.
- He was awarded the FusePR Award for Research of Social Impact for examining the barriers facing disabled people.
- He was awarded 1st place in the National Conference for University Professors Essay Prize in association with Times Higher Education Supplement in 2004.
- In 2021, he was identified as in the top 2 per cent of scientists (across disciplines) worldwide.

== Publications ==
Beresford has written and edited 30 books, over 110 journal articles and 130 book chapters. Beresford has also been a frequent contributor to The Guardian newspaper writing on social policy, social care and broader social issues.

In July 2018, he published (co-edited with Sarah Carr) Social Policy First Hand: An international introduction to participatory social welfare. This was the first global study of participatory public policy to be published.

His main publications include:

- Beresford, P. and Croft, S. (1978), A Say In The Future: Planning, participation and meeting social need, London, Battersea Community Action.
- Beresford, P. and Croft, S. (1986), Whose Welfare? Private care or public services, Brighton, Lewis Cohen Urban Studies Centre.
- Beresford P. and Croft, S. (1993), Citizen Involvement: A practical guide for change, 1993, Basingstoke, Macmillan.
- Beresford, P and Turner, M. (1997), It's Our Welfare: Report of the Citizens' Commission on the Future of the Welfare State, London, National Institute for Social Work.
- Beresford, P. Green, D. Lister, R. Woodard, K. (1999), Poverty First Hand, London, Child Poverty Action Group.
- Sweeney, A. Beresford, P. Faulkner, A. Nettle, M. Rose, D. (editors), (2009), This Is Survivor Research, Ross-on-Wye, PCSS Books.
- Beresford, P. (2010), A Straight Talking Guide To Being A Mental Health Service User, Ross-on-Wye, PCCS Books.
- Beresford, P. Fleming, J. Glynn, M. Bewley, C. Croft, S. Branfield, F. and Postle, K. (2011), Supporting people: Towards a person-centred approach, Bristol, Policy Press.
- Beresford, P. and Croft, S. (2012), User Controlled Research: Scoping Review, London, NHS National Institute for Health Research (NIHR) School for Social Car Research, London School of Economics.
- Beresford, P. and Carr, S. (editors), (2012) Service Users, Social Care And User Involvement, Research Highlights Series, London, Jessica Kingsley Publishers.
- Beresford, P. (2016), All Our Welfare: Towards Participatory Social Policy, Bristol, Policy Press.
- Beresford, P. and Carr, S. (2018) Social Policy First Hand: An international introduction to participatory social welfare, Bristol, Policy Press.
- Daley, A. Costa, L. Beresford, P. (editors), (2019), Madness, Violence And Power, A critical collection, Toronto, Toronto University Press.
- McLaughlin, H. Beresford, P. Cameron, C. Casey, H. & Duffy, J. (editors.) (2020) The Routledge Handbook of Service User Involvement in Human Services Research and Education, London: Routledge.
- Beresford, P. (2021), Participatory Ideology: From exclusion to involvement, Bristol, Policy Press.
- Beresford, P. Farr, M. Hickey, G. Kaur, M. Ocloo, J. Tembo, D. and Williams, O. (editors), (2021), COVID-19 And Co- production In Health And Social Care Research, Policy, And Practice - Volume 1: The Challenges and Necessity of Co-production, Rapid Response, Bristol, Policy Press.
- Williams, O. Tembo, D. Ocloo, J. Kaur, M. Hickey, G. Ocloo, J. Farr, M. Beresford, P. (editors), (2021), COVID-19 And Co- production In Health And Social Care Research, Policy, And Practice - Volume 2: Co-production Methods and Working Together at a Distance, Rapid Response, Bristol, Policy Press.
- Beresford, P. and Russo, J. (2022), The Routledge International Handbook Of Mad Studies, London, Routledge.
- Beresford, P. and Slasberg, C. (2023), The Future of Social Care: From problem to rights-based sustainable solution, Northampton, Edward Elgar Publishing, https://www.elgaronline.com/monobookoa/book/9781803923017/9781803923017.xml
- Beresford, P. (2023), A Straight Talking Introduction To Emotional Wellbeing: From mental illness to Mad Studies, Monmouth, PCCS publishers.
- Beresford, P. (2025), The Antidote: How people-powered movements can renew politics, policy and practice, Bristol, Policy Press.

His articles include:

- Beresford, P, (2002), User Involvement In Research And Evaluation: Liberation or regulation?, Social Policy And Society, Vol 1, No 2, pp. 93–103.
- Beresford, P. and Croft, S. (2004), Service Users And Practitioners Reunited: The key component for social work reform, The Future of Social Work, Special Issue, British Journal of Social Work, January, Vol 34, pp. 53–68.
- Beresford, P. Croft, S. Adshead, L. (2008), 'We Don't See Her as a Social Worker': A Service User Case Study of the Importance of the Social Worker's Relationship and Humanity, British Journal of Social Work, Vol 38, No 7, pp1388–1407.
- Beresford, P. and Boxall, K, (2012), Service Users, Social Work Education And Knowledge For Social Work Practice, Social Work Education, Vol 31, No 2, March, pp. 155–167.
- Russo, J. and Beresford, P. (2015), Between exclusion and colonisation: seeking a place for mad people's knowledge in academia, Disability & Society, Current Issues, Vol 30, No 1, pp. 153–157, DOI: 10.1080/09687599.2014.957925
- Beresford, P. (2019), Public Participation In Health And Social Care: Exploring the co-production of knowledge, Policy and practice review article, Frontiers in Sociology, January, https://www.frontiersin.org/articles/10.3389/fsoc.2018.00041/full
- Rose, D. and Beresford, P. (2023), PPI In Psychiatry and the Problem of Knowledge, BMC Psychiatry, 24, 52 (2024). https://doi.org/10.1186/s12888-023-05398-0
- Beresford, P. (2020), PPI Or User Involvement: Taking stock from a service user perspective in the twenty first century. Research, Involvement and Engagement, Vol 6, No 36, https://doi.org/10.1186/s40900-020-00211-8
