= Prior Hall =

Medical library at Ohio State University

Coordinates: 39°59′42″N 83°01′01″W

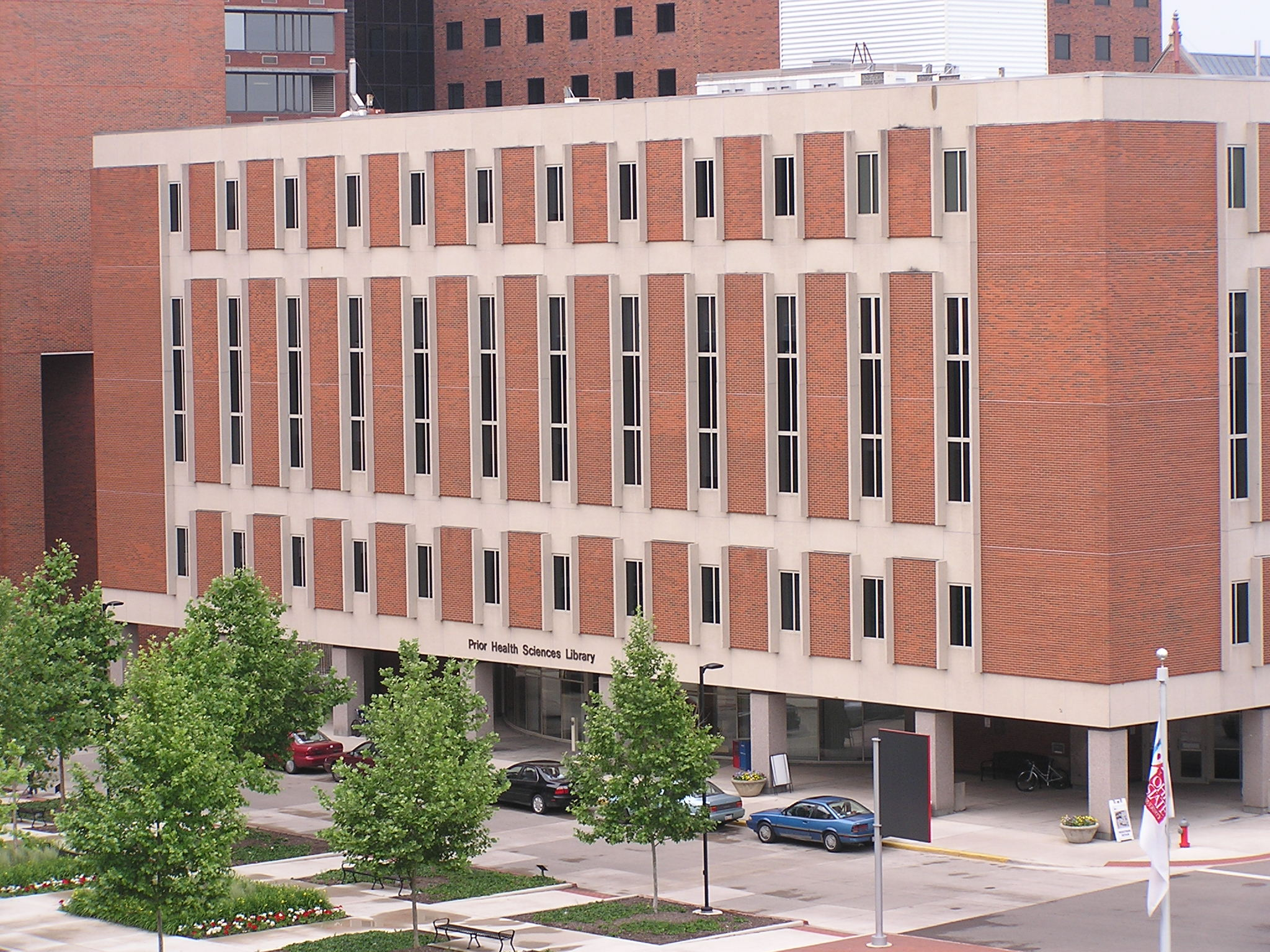
- Interactive map of the Prior Hall area

General information
- Type: Library
- Completed: 1971
- Opened: 1971

Prior Hall, originally known as the Health Sciences Library, is the home of the medical library at Ohio State University. The library was named the John A. Prior Health Sciences Library in 1988 and later renamed to Health Sciences Library in Prior Hall.

== History ==
1971 - Construction on the Health Sciences Library Building was completed in August 1971.

1972 - Health Sciences Library Building construction completed.

1988 - Renamed to the John A. Prior Health Sciences Library.

2003 - The Center for Knowledge Management was created in 2003 as a unit within the Health Sciences Library.

2007 - The Health Sciences Center for Global Health was added to the first floor.

2009 - A coffee bar named The Caffeine Element opened on the first floor. The Center for Clinical and Translational Science was added to the second floor.

2010 - Two floors were added onto the top of the building to house academic and clinical departments.

2011 - The Center for Knowledge Management was incorporated into the library's organization and the name shortened to the Health Sciences Library.

2011 - The building was renamed the John A. Prior Hall in 2011.

== The Mural ==
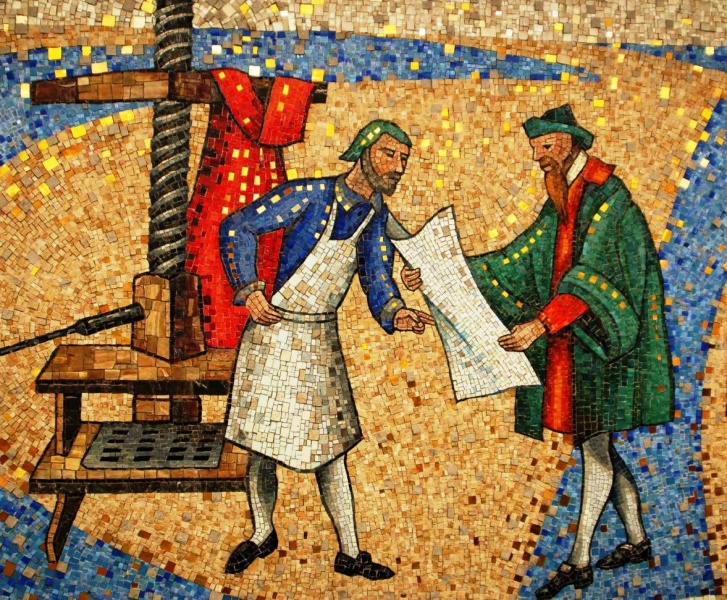
1st Floor Mural: Printing Press

The mural on the first floor of Prior Hall was created by Marguerite Gaudin of the Willet Studio in Philadelphia. Artists for the mosaic were Costante Crovatto, Giovanni Travisanutto, and Nicky Milanese. Installed in 1974, it is the centerpiece of the first floor. The mural shows the development of human communication across time.

The theme was developed by a committee within the College of Medicine composed of Georgr Hahn, Dr. Richard Meiling, Dr. Karl Klassen, Dr. John Prior, and Dr. Donald Westra.

Measuring sixty-seven feet long and nine feet tall, the colorful mural uses marble, colored cubes of silica metallic oxides, glass cubes with gold leaf veneer and onyx. Before the building renovation in 1996, the mural was along a dimly lit exterior walkway. Part of the renovation process involved cleaning and restoring the mural.

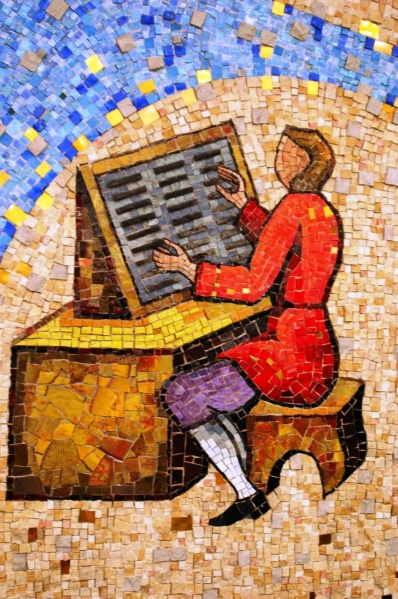
1st Floor Mural: Typesetter

== Spaces ==
In addition to the Health Sciences Library, Prior Hall also contains the following:

- Clinical Skills Education and Assessment Center
- Health Sciences Center for Global Health
- Ohio State University Wexner Medical Center IT desk
- Center for Clinical and Translational Science
- Medical Heritage Center
- Academic offices for the Department of Emergency Medicine
- Department of Orthopaedics and Division of Vascular Diseases & Surgery
- Caffeine Element coffee and snack shop

== The Medical Heritage Center ==
Occupying the 5th floor of Prior Hall, The Medical Heritage Center (MHC) collects, displays and archives artifacts; provides a venue for historical medical research; and supports medical history education. The MHC also serves as the repository of data, artifacts, and historical information relating to the health and medical education and the medical profession in central Ohio.

== Health Sciences Library ==
=== Resources ===
The Health Sciences Library offers access to more than 6200 Health Science eJournals, 10,000 eBooks and more than 107,000 print books. They also offer access to more than 91 different databases, such as Clinical Key, which provides access to more than 1,500 health sciences books and journals, plus more than 13,000 medical and surgical videos. More than 8,000 additional videos are available from Films on Demand, including nearly 2,000 in health and medicine.

== OSU:pro ==
OSU:pro was a knowledge management database tool, which helps to organize scholarly activities, and streamlines the building of faculty dossiers. The tool is used to communicate professional accomplishments to visitors searching for local expertise, thereby expanding opportunities for the community to interact and engage with the university.

In 2007, OSU:pro was awarded the inaugural Innovation Award by the Association of Academic Health Sciences Libraries.

In 2012, OSU:Pro becomes Research in View.

== The Randtriever ==
The Randtriever was a first generation automated storage and retrieval system, and the first installed in a library in the United States. The system, built by Sperry Rand, was designed to have twelve aisles, but only eight were installed, along with four calling stations/circulation desks located at both ends of the machine on each of two floors of the library. The system, which originally cost $811,799, required constant maintenance resulting in expenditures of $889,191 through June 1990, plus $139,575 for conversion/renovation of the system. In 1989, the university made the decision to remove the Randtriever in conjunction with anticipated expansion and renovation of the library.
