= Future planning for disability care =

For many elderly carers of a relative who has a learning or other disability, future planning is an issue. The population of older parents who have children with a learning disability is growing and many of their children are likely to outlive them. In many cases the caring role can span up to seven decades, ending only with their death. Governments and other service providers cannot ignore the pressing needs of this population and their parent and sibling carers. In most countries, family carers provide inexpensive care for a person with a learning disability and other disabilities. This trend is set to continue in England. Demographic changes and the health needs of these two growing populations must be considered against government policy constraints and limited in-home and external care options in order to avoid a crisis. The consequences of not supporting these family carers will lead to crisis management, increase in distress and care giving burdens, and increased spending on unsuitable crisis placements. Housing and financial guidance are issues for caregivers.

== Future plan ==
A future plan is a structured plan for a carer's relative who has a learning disability covering all aspects of well-being of that person. Clarifying and sharing the future plan for the relative is very important. A clear written statement of the carer's future plan enables key people to understand the relative's perspective. It allows others to understand what is involved and provides new opportunities for the family to contribute to the plan. Plans are often not put in place as a result of denial by parents or carers of their own mortality and of the fact that they won't be able to help. Carers have referred to a lack of support and guidance and are reluctant to ask for help.

== Housing ==
=== United Kingdom ===
Many family carers find it uncomfortable to explore out-of-home placements (housing) and support (or personal care) options for their relative with learning disabilities. Research has shown that older parents or sibling carers want their relative to stay within their own home either with family or professional support, or move into a home of a sibling. Residential care is a lesser preferred option.

Housing and support in Northern Ireland can be either provided separately by different organisations or offered together by the same organisation. Such services were provided by Health & Social Care Trusts, although recently there are a number of alternative providers (i.e. Mencap, Positive Futures, PRAXIS, APEX and Trinity Housing). These offer people with learning disabilities different living and support arrangements. The majority of people with learning disabilities in Northern Ireland and the United Kingdom live with their family. Family carers have limited knowledge about the different housing options that are available. Potential housing options in Northern Ireland include supported living, residential care, nursing home accommodation, adult placements and intentional community.

== Funding ==
=== United Kingdom ===
Disability Living Allowance (DLA) or Personal Independence Payment (PIP) is paid at different rates depending on how a disability affects someone. Disability Living Allowance is in two parts: the care component and the mobility component. Attendance Allowance is, in 2013, paid weekly at two different rates. It depends on the level of help required. Extra Pension Credit or Housing Benefit is also available. Incapacity Benefit, which replaced Invalidity Benefit and has been replaced by Employment and Support Allowance, is money for people who cannot work because they are sick or disabled. Independent Living Fund (ILF) provides money to help disabled people live an independent life in the community rather than in residential care.

There are different methods to fund housing and support options (in Northern Ireland). Direct payments from social services are payments made to the family carer or the person with the learning disability to buy care services. Direct payments give the family carer money instead of social care services. Carers have a greater choice and control over the life of a person with a learning disability, and are able to make decisions about how care is delivered.

== Emergency plans ==
Emergency plans are for any period when the caregiver is unable to care for their charge for a short-period of time. Family carers want to continue caring for as long as possible and also want to engage in emergency and future planning. Educational programmes have been developed to help ageing parents prepare future plans. Without plans and supports in place, individuals with learning disabilities may be placed in inappropriate settings, or in unexpected care provided by other family members.

== See also ==
- Will and testament
- Trusts
- Trustee
