= 18th Avenue Library =

Library at the Ohio State University in Columbus, Ohio, U.S.

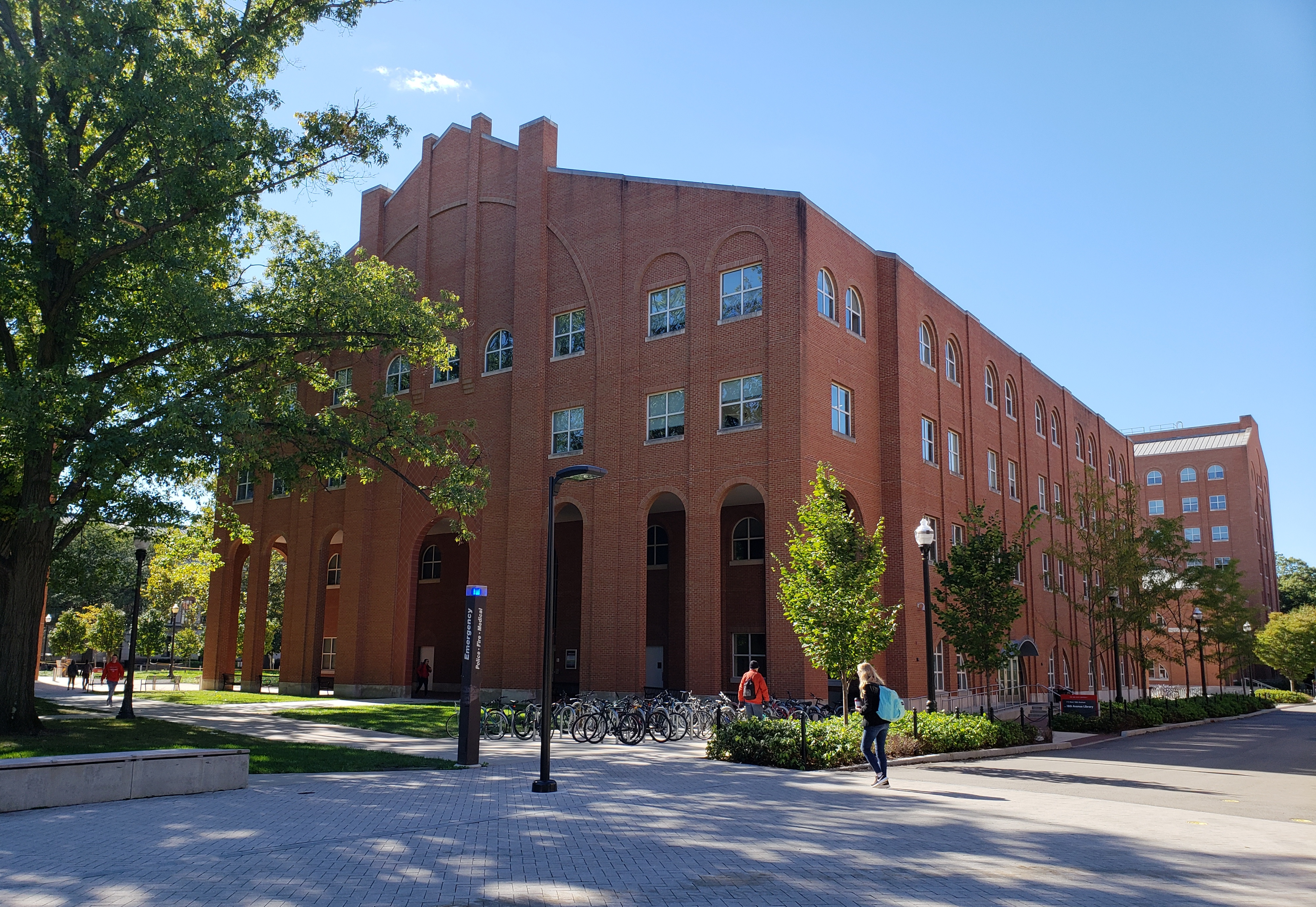
- The library building's exterior in 2018
- 40°0′5.9″N 83°0′48.0″W
- Location: Ohio State University, United States
- Type: Library

The 18th Avenue Library (formerly the Science and Engineering Library) is a library on the Ohio State University campus, in Columbus, Ohio, United States.

== History ==
Built to consolidate existing smaller science and engineering libraries, the library's construction began in 1991 after the demolition of the Brown Hall Annex. The library was designed by Philip Johnson as part of a three building project on campus. The newly constructed library opened in January 3rd, 1993. In 2011, Music and dance collections were added to the library's collection which resulted in it being renamed 18th Avenue Library.
