= Focus on Autism and Other Developmental Disabilities =

- Discipline: Learning Disabilities
- Language: English
- Edited by: Alisa K. Lowrey, Kevin M. Ayres

Publication details
- Former name: Focus on Autistic Behavior
- History: 1986-present
- Publisher: SAGE Publications (United States)
- Frequency: Quarterly
- Impact factor: 0.959 (2017)

Standard abbreviations
- ISO 4: Focus Autism Other Dev. Disabil.
- NLM: Focus Autism Other Dev Disabl

Indexing
- ISSN: 1088-3576 (print); 1538-4829 (web)
- OCLC no.: 48880216

Links
- Journal homepage; Online access; Online archive

Focus on Autism and Other Developmental Disabilities is a peer-reviewed academic journal covering the field of special education and learning disabilities. The editors-in-chief are Alisa K. Lowrey (University of Southern Mississippi) and Kevin M. Ayres (The University of Georgia). It was established in 1986 and is published by SAGE Publications in association with the Hammill Institute on Disabilities.

== Abstracting and indexing ==
The journal is abstracted and indexed in Scopus and the Social Sciences Citation Index. According to the Journal Citation Reports, its 2017 impact factor is 0.959, ranking it 29th out of 40 journals in the category "Education, Special", 51st out of 69 journals in the category "Rehabilitation", and 65th out of 73 journals in the category "Psychology, Developmental".
