= Social currency =

Sociological concept

Social currency refers to the actual and potential resources from presence in social networks and communities, including both digital and offline. It is, in essence, an action made by a company or stance of being, to which consumers feel a sense of value when associating with a brand, while the humanization of the brand generates loyalty and "word of mouth" virality for the organization. The concept derives from Pierre Bourdieu's social capital theory and relates to increasing one's sense of community, granting access to information and knowledge, helping to form one's identity, and providing status and recognition.

== In marketing and management ==
In their study on social currency, the consulting company Vivaldi Partners defined social currency as the extent to which people share the brand or information about the brand as part of their everyday social lives at work or at home. This sharing helps companies to create unique brand identities and earn permission to interact with consumers or customers. In today's age, building social currency is an important investment companies can make to create value for themselves. Social Currency moves social initiatives and campaigns beyond marketing and communications efforts to impacting and changing entire industries and categories. Consumers and customers will benefit as well as they increasingly participate in social platforms, and use social technologies.

Social currency can be divided into six dimensions or levers: affiliation, conversation, utility, advocacy, information, and identity.

The Social Currency Wheel (pictured below) is an alternative to the traditional brand funnel or customer decision journey. The Social Currency Wheel evaluates the impact of social behaviors of customers on social currency and three outcomes: consideration, purchase, and loyalty. The goal of the Social Currency Wheel is to explain how customers' social processes and behaviors drive each of the conversions. Marketers can engage with customers during these social processes and behaviors, and influence the outcomes.

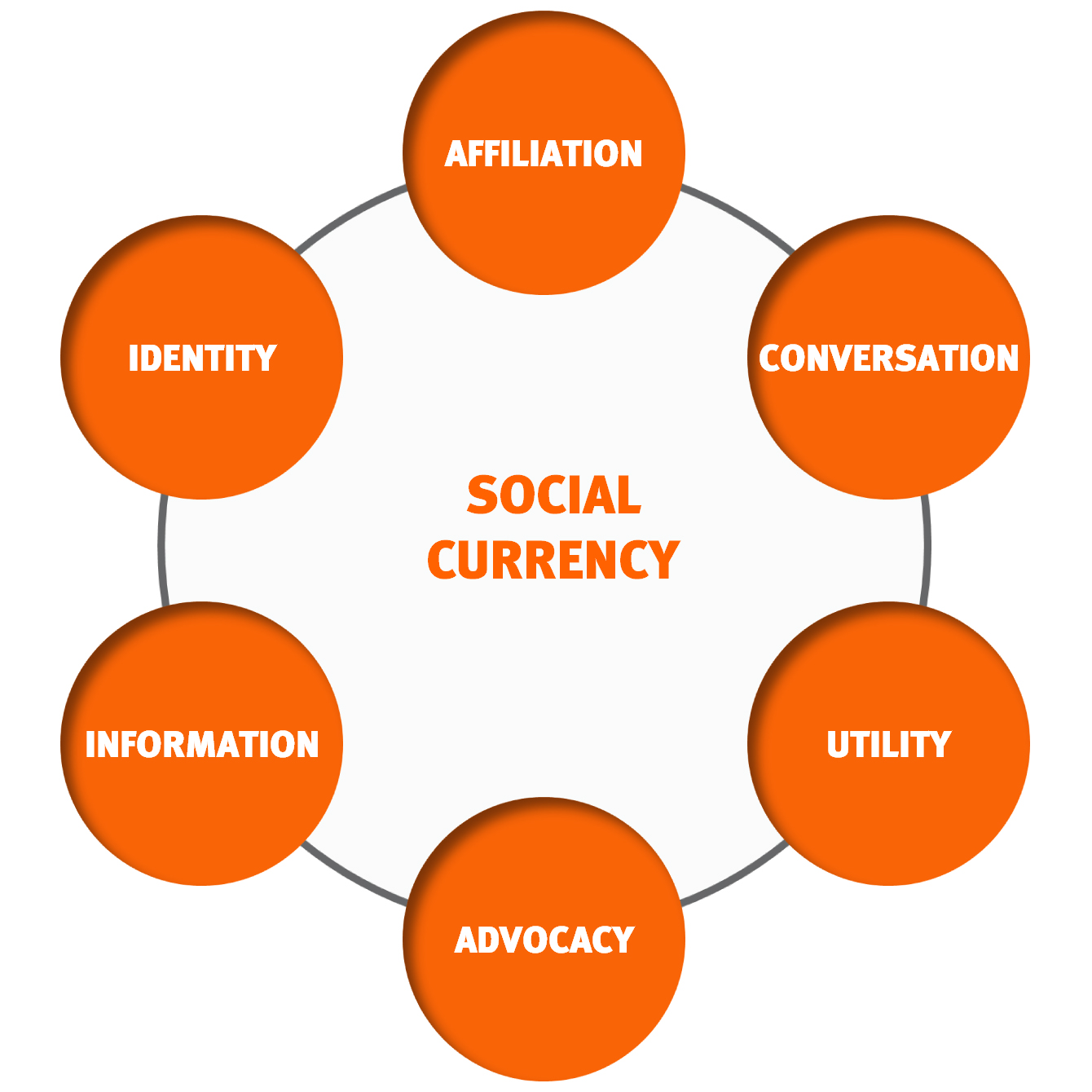

This model is about creating a sense of community and by that a strong affiliation between customers, consumers and users of a brand. Having social currency increases a brand's engagement with consumers and interaction with customers, and by that adding to the customer conversation around the brand, it grants access to information and knowledge, which is being shared within the customer base. Belonging to a group also helps users of a brand to grow personally by accessing new utility and also developing their own identity in the respective peer group. A strong attachment to a brand will also be a core driver for an active advocacy recommending or even defending the brand.

Social currency is information shared which encourages further social encounters. It can be a factor in establishing fans of sports or television programmes. As well as talking about sports, attendance at sports events themselves is a form of social currency. Young men in particular feel the need to learn about sporting current events in order to facilitate social interaction. However, these types of fan can easily move to a new sport, team, or programme in the future if the new one offers more social currency. Women may use jewellery and clothes as part of their social currency, providing a way into communication.

Proper social currency tactics includes responding to comments, sharing posts to groups and forums, and strategic posting time and placement.

== See also ==
- Social capital
