= Disability studies =

Academic discipline examining the meaning, nature, and consequences of disability

Disability studies is an academic discipline that examines the meaning, nature, and consequences of disability. Initially, the field focused on the division between "impairment" and "disability", where impairment was an impairment of an individual's mind or body, while disability was considered a social construct. This premise gave rise to two distinct models of disability: the social and medical models of disability. In 1999 the social model was universally accepted as the model preferred by the field.

However, in recent years, the division between the social and medical models has been challenged. Alternative models of disability have increased, allowing for greater complexity and specificity in how disability is theorized. Additionally, there has been an increased focus on interdisciplinary research. For example, recent investigations suggest using "cross-sectional markers of stratification" may help provide new insights on the non-random distribution of risk factors capable of worsening the disablement processes. Such risk factors can be acute or chronic stressors, which can increase cumulative risk factors (overeating, excessive drinking, etc.) The decline of immune function with age and decrease of inter-personal relationships which can impact cognitive function with age.

Disability studies courses include work in disability history, theory, legislation, policy, ethics, and the arts. However, students are taught to focus on the lived experiences of individuals with disabilities in practical terms. The field is focused on increasing individuals with disabilities access to civil rights and improving their quality of life.

Disability studies emerged in the 1980s primarily in the US, the UK, and Canada. In 1986, the Section for the Study of Chronic Illness, Impairment, and Disability of the Social Science Association (United States) was renamed the Society for Disability Studies. The first US disabilities studies program emerged in 1994 at Syracuse University. The first edition of the Disabilities Studies Reader (one of the first collections of academic papers related to disability studies) was published in 1997. The field grew rapidly over the next ten years. In 2005, the Modern Language Association established disability studies as a "division of study".

While disability studies primarily emerged in the US, the UK, and Canada, disability studies were also conducted in other countries through different lenses. For instance, Germany has been involved with queer disability studies since the beginning of the early 20th century. The disability studies in Germany are influenced by the written literary works of feminist sexologists who study how being disabled affects one's sexuality and ability to feel pleasure. In Norway, disability studies are focused on the literary context.

A variation emerged in 2017 with the first accessibility studies program at Central Washington University with an interdisciplinary focus on social justice, universal design, and international Web Accessibility Guidelines (WAG3) as a general education knowledge base.

== History ==
Universities have long studied disabilities from a clinical perspective, and discussions around the depathologization of disability began following the disability rights movement, which arose in the 1950s. In 1981, the United Nations' International Year of Disabled Persons brought disability into the public sphere as a human rights issue. Five years later, the Social Science Association's Section for the Study of Chronic Illness, Impairment, and Disability was renamed the Society for Disability Studies, and its journal Disability Studies Quarterly was the first journal in disability studies. The first US disabilities studies program emerged in 1994 at Syracuse University. However, courses and programs were very few. In the 1997 first edition of the Disability Studies Reader, Lennard J. Davis wrote that "it had been virtually impossible to have someone teaching about disability within the humanities". In the second edition, written ten years later, he writes that "all that has changed", but "just because disability studies is on the map, does not mean that is easy to find".

Still the field continued to grow throughout the 2000s. In 2009 Disability Studies Quarterly published A Multinational Review of English-language Disability Studies Degrees and Courses. They found that from 2003 to 2008 the number of disability studies stand-alone studies programs in the US, UK, Australia, New Zealand, and Canada grew from 56 to 108 and the number of degree-granting programs grew from 212 to 420. A total of 17 degrees in disability studies were offered, with 11 programs in the US, 2 in the UK, 3 in Canada, and 1 in Australia.

The 2014 article "Disability Studies: A New Normal" in The New York Times suggests that the expansion in disability studies programs is related to the 1990 passage of the Americans with Disabilities Act (ADA). Those raised after the passage of the ADA have entered colleges and the workforce, as Disability Studies has grown. In a 2014 article, Disability Studies Quarterly published an analysis on the relationships between student run groups and disability studies, from 2008 to 2012. Their article analyzes groups at four different universities and describes how professors have incorporated student activism into their curriculum and research.

== Definitions ==
According to the transnational Society for Disability Studies:

Using an interdisciplinary, multidisciplinary approach. Disability sits at the intersection of many overlapping disciplines in the humanities, sciences, and social sciences. Programs in Disability Studies should encourage a curriculum that allows students, activists, teachers, artists, practitioners, and researchers to engage the subject matter from various disciplinary perspectives.

- Challenging the view of disability as an individual deficit or defect that can be remedied solely through medical intervention or rehabilitation by "experts" and other service providers. Rather, a program in Disability Studies should explore models and theories that examine social, political, cultural, and economic factors that define disability and help determine personal and collective responses to difference. At the same time, Disability Studies should work to de-stigmatize disease, illness, and impairment, including those that cannot be measured or explained by biological science. Finally, while acknowledging that medical research and intervention can be useful, Disability Studies should interrogate the connections between medical practice and stigmatizing disability.
- Studying national and international perspectives, policies, literature, culture, and history with an aim of placing current ideas of disability within their broadest possible context. Since attitudes toward disability have not been the same across times and places, much can be gained by learning from these other experiences.
- Encouraging participation by disabled students and faculty, and ensuring physical and intellectual access. Prioritizing leadership positions held by disabled people; at the same time, it is important to create an environment where contributions from anyone who shares the above goals are welcome.

== Disability studies and medical humanities ==
The social model of disability is expanded to chronic illness and to the broader work of the medical humanities. Practitioners are working towards improving the healthcare for disabled people through disability studies. This multi-disciplinary field of inquiry draws on the experiences and perspectives of people with disabilities to address discrimination. Infinite Ability has done some preliminary work in India to introduce disability studies to medical students. The medical humanities movement advocates use of literature in exploring illness, from practitioner and patient perspectives, with graphic medicine as an emerging strategy that combines comics-style medium and illness narrative.

== Intersectionality ==
Feminism introduces the inclusion of intersectionality in disability studies. It focuses on race, gender, sexuality, class and other related systems of oppression that can also intersect with having a disability. From a feminist standpoint, there is a large concern for grasping multiple positions and differences among social groups. Some research on intersectionality and disability has focused on the aspect of being part of two or more stigmatized groups and how these are contributing factors to multiple forms of harassment, the paradox known as "Double Jeopardy".

In academic settings and practices such as gender or women's studies the course work does not always highlight ideals of intersectionality and identity. But Sri Craven highlights the fact that in academia students and professors do not look at history in a culmination of the intersecting identities but rather focus in one perspective. Craven and his colleagues include identities such as disability both mental and physical in an alternative course description to get students and faculty to think about identity, oppression and struggle in a new way.

=== Race ===
Recent scholarship has included studies that explore the intersection between disability and race. Christopher Bell's work publicly challenged disability studies to engage with race, calling it "white disability studies". His posthumous volume on Blackness and Disability further developed his analysis. These works engage with issues of what he perceived as neoliberal economic oppression. The 2009 publication of Fiona Kumari Campbell's Contours of Ableism: The Production of Disability and Abledness signaled a new direction of research – studies in ableism, moving beyond preoccupations with disability to explore the maintenance of abledness in sexed, raced and modified bodies. A. J. Withers' work critiques the social model of disability because, among other things, it erases the experiences of BIPOC people, women, trans and queer people and puts forward a more radical model of disability. Other contemporary works, such as literary studies conducted by Sami Schalk explore the intersection of disability and race and the use of dis/ability as a metaphor within the genre of black women's speculative fiction. Collectively, these works reflect an effort to deal with complex histories of marking racially "othered" bodies as physically, psychologically, or morally deficient, and traces this history of scientific racism to contemporary dynamics. Empirical studies show that minority students are disproportionately more likely to be removed from class or school for "behavioral" or academic reasons, and far more likely to be labeled with intellectual or learning disabilities.

In addition to work by individual scholars, disability studies organizations have also begun to focus on disability and race and gender. The Society for Disability Studies created the Chris Bell Memorial Scholarship to honor Bell's commitment to diversity in disability studies. Postsecondary disability studies programs increasingly engage with the intersectionality of oppression. The University of Manitoba offers a course on "Women with disabilities". Several recent masters' student research papers at York University focus on issues related to women with disabilities and people of African descent with disabilities.

=== Feminism ===
Feminism integrates the social and political aspects that makes a body oppressed while allowing empowerment to be present in acknowledging its culture. Scholars of feminist disability studies include Rosemarie Garland-Thomson and Alison Kafer. Garland-Thomson explains that these related systems of oppression pervades all aspects of culture by "its structuring institutions, social identities, cultural practices, political positions, historical communities, and the shared human experience of embodiment". Garland-Thomson further describes that "identity based critical enterprises have enriched and complicated our understandings of social justice, subject formation, subjugated knowledges and collective action". Feminism works towards accessibility for everyone regardless of which societal oppressive behavior makes them a minority. Although physical adjustments are most commonly fought for in disability awareness, psychological exclusion also plays a major role oppressing people with disabilities. The intersection of disability and feminism is more common in American history than we think yet it does not show up in media, museums or archives that are dedicated to feminist work. Rachel Corbman, a professor of women's, gender and sexuality studies at Stony Brook University in New York highlights how the influence of lesbian feminist organizations like the Disabled Lesbian Alliance (DLA) are not represented in the archives of literature and documentation of events in the community. The DLA work closely together to fight for visibility, accessibility and acceptance of individuals whether they are disabled, or lesbian or both. Corbman's article highlights the beginning of disability activism during the feminist movement of the 1970s and 1980s and how the intersecting identities enticed new members and activists from across the country to join the cause. Other disability-centered feminist organizations that are part of the feminist archives include the Lesbian Illness Support Group and Gay and Lesbian Blind (GLB). Sara Ahmed elaborates the mental exclusiveness of privilege in "Atmospheric Walls": there is an atmosphere surrounding minority bodies, explaining why an intersectionally privileged person could be made uncomfortable simply by being in the same room as a person of color, or in this case someone with a disability. Feminists and scholars also developed theories that put attention on the connection of gender and disability. Scholars like Thomas J. Gerschick argue that disability plays a big role in processing and experiencing gender, and people with disabilities often suffer stigmatization towards their gender, since their disabilities may make their body representation excluded by normative binary gender representation. Gerschick also argues that this stigmatization can affect the gendering process and self-representation of people with disabilities. Ellen Samuels explores gender, queer sexualities, and disability. Feminists also look into how people with disabilities are politically oppressed and powerless. Abby L. Wilkerson argues that people with disabilities are politically powerless because they are often desexualized, and the lack of sexual agency leads to the lack of political agency. Wilkerson also indicates that the erotophobia towards minority groups like people with disabilities further oppresses them, since it prevents these groups from gaining political power through sexual agency and power.

=== Critical disability theory ===
At the intersection of disability studies and critical theory is critical disability theory. The term crip theory originates in Carrie Sandahl's article "Queering the Crip or Crippling the Queer?: Intersections of Queer and Crip Identities in Solo Autobiographical Performance". It was published in 2003 as part of a journal issue titled "Desiring Disability: Queer Theory Meets Disability Studies". Christopher Bell's Blackness and Disability; and the work of Robert McRuer both explore queerness and disability. Work includes the intersections of race and ethnicity with disability in the field of education studies and has attempted to bridge critical race theory with disability studies.

- 2006 Crip Theory: Cultural Signs of Queerness and Disability by Robert McRuer
- 2011 Feminist Disability Studies by Kim Q. Hall
- 2012 Sex and Disability by Robert McRuer, Anna Mollow
- 2013 Feminist, Queer, Crip by Alison Kafer
- 2018 Crip Times: Disability, Globalization, and Resistance by Robert McRuer
- 2018 Disability Studies and the Environmental Humanities: Toward an Eco-Crip Theory by Sarah Jaquette Ray, Jay Sibara, Stacy Alaimo
- 2019 The Matter of Disability: Materiality, Biopolitics, Crip Affect by David T. Mitchell, Susan Antebi, et al.

Most of the literature above is written by individual authors in the United States but there is nothing on there from other countries that depicts disability and sexuality in the same context. Myren-Svelstad, a Norwegian scholar compares two deviant novels in Norway's society, Nini Roll Anker's Enken [the Widow] written in 1932 and Magnhild Haalke's Allis sønn [Alli's Son] written in 1935. They both depict a queer man who is also disabled. The disability being depicted as someone whose mental capacity is significantly different than society's heteronormative view. The significance of the movements began to build momentum and most legal recognition in the 1980s. It was only in 1973 that the American Psychiatric Association removed homosexuality from their list of mental disorders. In addition to this, it was about forty years later in 2013 that the Diagnostic and Statistical Manual of Mental Disorders, Fifth Edition (DSM-5) changed the listing of transgender to "gender dysphoria".

One of the most notable circumstances where the case of these two minority rights come together was the court case In re Guardianship of Kowalski, in which an accident that occurred in 1983 left 36-year-old Sharon Kowalski physically disabled with severe brain injuries. The court granted guardianship of her to her homophobic parents who refused visitation rights to her long time partner, Karen Thompson. The court case lasted nearly ten years and was resolved by granting Thompson custody in 1991. This was a major victory in the realm of gay rights but also called to attention the validity of rights for those who identified under the queer and disabled spectrum. Numerous support groups emerged from necessity to create safe spaces for those identifying in these specific minority groups such as the founding of the Rainbow Alliance of the Deaf in 1977, the Lesbian Disabled Veterans of America group in 1996 which then became the Gay, Lesbian, Bisexual and Transgender Disabled Veterans of America, and the San Francisco Gay Amputees group in 2006.

A 2012 study showed that disability was more common in LGBTQ individuals when compared to heterosexual peers. It was also shown that the LGBTQ group with disabilities were noticeably younger in age than the heterosexual group. In a 2014 study of intersecting identities found that "disabled women whether gay, straight, bisexual or otherwise identifying have a harder time finding romantic relationships due to their socioeconomic status and ability. Drummond and Brotman introduce the idea that the lesbian disabled community face many barriers because of discrimination in the form of ableism, homophobia, racism and more due to intersecting identities and interests.

It is also a large topic of discussion to say that both groups have to undergo the same kind of "coming out" process in terms of their sexual identity, gender identity, and disability identity because of the lasting social stigma. "Coming out" through sexual identity, gender identity, and disability identity is one example of "Double Jeopardy", as they are part of more than one stigmatized group.

Eli Clare writes at the intersection of disability and transgender studies, namely as to how these disciplines can learn from each other. Similarly to how there is a 'coming out' for both transgender people and people with disabilities, there is a lack of bodily privacy both groups are faced with, primarily due to an over-medicalization of the body. Clare also works to make the distinction between bodily and medical truths, where one's diagnosis and medical treatment as a transgender or disabled person does not dictate their embodiment and how they navigate the world. Eventually, Clare reaches the idea of a disability politics of transness, which "delves into the lived experiences of our bodies, that questions the idea of normal and the notion of cure, that values self-determination, that resists shame and the medicalization of identity".

=== Queer theory ===
Queer studies, which emerged from women's studies, brings light towards the different kind of oppression queer and transgender people with disabilities have. Queer studies are commonly associated with people with disabilities who identify as "Crip" and is commonly believed that queer politics must incorporate crip politics. Alison Kafer describes a first-person experience of identifying queer and crip both reappropriated terms in Kafer's Feminist Queer Crip. Kafer describes the politics of the crip future and "an insistence on thinking these imagined futures — and hence, these lived presents — differently".

An aspect of disability studies that is not often talked about is that of the perception of seeing disabled individuals as invisible. Also known as "queer/disabled invisibility". In disability studies the individuals who are disabled who make it into academic course work are usually the ones who struggle not only with being disabled and facing ableist norms of society but they also have to contend with other identities such as being queer, a woman or a person of another race other than cis-gendered white male in America. Queer/disabled invisibility can also come up in forms of negative perceptions about the way a disabled individual is being raised. For instance, queer mothers raising a disabled child are often viewed as the cause of the child's disability. Another example of queer and disabled negativity is highlighted in the life experiences of Josie, a young person who does not identify as a particular gender, living with a lifelong illness and disability. This young person describes how they experienced sexism, ableism, homophobia and transphobia in a number of ways at their university, the queer community and medical providers because of their disability. The discrimination the person in this example faces is part of the heteronormative, ableist perspective in societies around the world today but are rarely discussed in the literature or during disability studies courses.

=== Political economy and social class ===
Within class comes multiple avenues for intersectionality through disability. Disability looks different from a middle class, upper class, and lower class perspective, as well as through race, gender, and ethnicity. One's social class can contribute to when a person becomes disabled, rather it be sooner or later. For example, where there is poverty we will find disability. This poverty can include social, economic, and cultural poverty. Having a disability can contribute to poverty just as poverty can contribute to having a disability. People with disabilities are more likely to live in poverty and be unemployed than those who do not, resulting in lower socioeconomic status. Some scholars have argued that disability, as it is understood today, is interlocked with class and capitalism. Intellectual disability, as it is understood today, is the product of the industrial revolution as workers unable to keep up with fast-paced factory work were pathologized.

Robert McRuer challenges hegemonic, neoliberal capitalism as the agent that drives the dominant cultural and market priorities and further argues that capitalism drives compulsory able-bodiedness. In Feminist, Queer, Crip, Alison Kafer states "My goal is to contextualize, historically and politically, the meanings typically attributed to disability, thereby positioning "disability" as a set of practices and associations that can be critiqued, contested, and transformed."

== Criticism ==
=== Questioning the social model ===
The International Association of Accessibility Professionals recognizes six different models for conceptualizing disability: social, medical, cultural affiliation, economic, charity, and functional solutions. Once universally accepted in the field, there has been a developing counter-argument to the social model of disability since at least 2009. In a 2014 Disability Studies Quarterly article, students involved in campus disability groups note that they actively seek cures for their chronic illnesses and "question the rejection of the medical model" of disability. The cultural affiliation model accepts the person's disability completely and uses it a point of pride in being associated with other people in a similar condition. The economic model recognizes the effect of bodily limitations on a person's ability to work, and there may be a need for economic support or accommodations for the person's disability while the charity model regards people with disabilities as unfortunate and in need of assistance from the outside, with those providing charity viewed as benevolent contributors to a needy population. The functional solutions model of disability is a practical perspective that identifies the limitations (or "functional impairments") due to disability, with the intent to create and promote solutions to overcome those limitations. The primary task is to eliminate, or at least reduce, the impact of the functional limitations of the body through technological or methodological innovation. The pragmatism of the functional solution model deemphasizes the sociopolitical aspects of disability, and instead prioritizes inventiveness and entrepreneurship. This is the prevailing opinion behind compliance literature that promotes self-efficacy and self-advocacy skills for people with disabilities preparing for transition to independent living.

The social model has also been challenged for creating a false separation between disability and impairment as impairment, not just disability, is socially constructed. This critique draws on feminist arguments that the assertion that sex is biological but gender is social is a false dichotomy because sex is also socially constructed. This is not a rejection of physical reality but draws attention to the social value put on some values, needs and accommodations and the denigration of others.

=== Exclusion of cognitive and mental disabilities ===
There is discourse within disability studies to analyze the construction of mental illness. However, few post-structuralist disability scholars have focused their attention to impairments of the mind. According to Carol Thomas, a reader in sociology at the Institute for Health Research, Lancaster University, this may be because disability scholars have in the past considered only the barriers confronted by people with physical disabilities. The experience of impairment, cognitive disability, and mental illness had been absent from the discussion.

It is unclear exactly which perspective of disability scholarship "psychological impairment" can fall under, and this has led to a hesitation on the part of scholars. Scholars such as Peter Beresford (2002) suggest "the development of a 'social model of madness and distress'" which would consider impairments of the mind. Yet others may recommend the "embodied approach" to the study of mental illnesses.

=== Term "crip" ===
Although many activists with disabilities find empowerment in appropriating the term crip, not all people with disabilities feel comfortable using that identity. There are many different terms used as an alternative to disability, for example Melwood, a nonprofit who uses the term "differing abilities", describes the label disability as "a limitation in the ability to pursue an occupation because of a physical or mental impairment; a disqualification, restriction or disadvantage and a lack of legal qualification to do something, was an inadequate or limiting 'label' for a cross section of people". Because the term disability has a history of inferiority, it is believed by many that substituting the term will help eliminate the ableism that is embedded within it. Susan Wendell describes ableism in society "as a structure for people who have no weakness". This also applies to anyone who has any intersectional disadvantages. Feminism identifies these disadvantages and strategizes how to deconstruct the system that supports marginalizing specific groups of people.

== See also ==
- Accessibility
- Cultural studies
- Developmental disability
- Disability and poverty
- Disability & Society
- Disability Studies in Education
- Future planning for disability care
- Inclusion (disability rights)
- List of disability studies journals
- Medical industrial complex
- Special education
- Theatre and disability
- Neuroqueer theory
