= Journal of Intellectual Disabilities =

- Discipline: Psychology
- Language: English
- Edited by: Dr. Fintan Sheerin

Publication details
- History: 1997-present
- Publisher: SAGE Publications (United Kingdom)
- Frequency: Quarterly

Standard abbreviations
- ISO 4: J. Intellect. Disabil.

Indexing
- ISSN: 1744-6295 (print); 1744-6309 (web)
- LCCN: 2005214150
- OCLC no.: 60613783

Links
- Journal homepage; Online access; Online archive

The Journal of Intellectual Disabilities is a quarterly peer-reviewed academic journal that covers research in the field of healthcare and nursing as related to intellectual disabilities. The journal's editor-in-chief is Dr. Fintan Sheerin (Trinity Centre for Ageing and Intellectual Disability). It was established in 1997 and is currently published by SAGE Publications.

== Abstracting and indexing ==
The Journal of Intellectual Disabilities is abstracted and indexed in:

- Social Sciences Citation Index
- Arts & Humanities Citation Index
- Academics Premier
- Educational Research Abstracts Online
- MEDLINE
