= Disability & Society =

- Discipline: Disability studies
- Language: English
- Edited by: Michele Moore

Publication details
- Former name(s): Disability, Handicap & Society
- History: 1986–present
- Publisher: Taylor & Francis
- Frequency: 10/year
- Impact factor: 1.212 (2017)

Standard abbreviations
- ISO 4: Disabil. Soc.

Indexing
- CODEN: DSCIET
- ISSN: 0968-7599
- LCCN: 2007233711
- OCLC no.: 808984972

Links
- Journal homepage; Online access; Online archive

Disability & Society is a peer-reviewed academic journal in the field of disability studies. It was established in 1986 as Disability, Handicap & Society, obtaining its current name in 1994. It is published by Taylor & Francis and the editor-in-chief is Michele Moore (University of Essex). According to the Journal Citation Reports, the journal has a 2017 impact factor of 1.212, ranking it 42nd out of 98 journals in the category "Social Sciences, Interdisciplinary" and 40th out of 69 in the category "Rehabilitation".
