= Society for Disability Studies =

International academic network

The Society for Disability Studies is an international academic network of disability studies practitioners. It often abbreviates its name to SDS, though that abbreviation continues to be used by academics and political scientists to describe the Students for a Democratic Society organization in the United States. The society's overall goal is to promote disability studies as a serious academic discipline on par with philosophy, the social sciences, and similar fields.

== Definition of disability studies ==
In 1993 the society adopted an official definition of "Disability Studies":

... examines the policies and practices of all societies to understand the social, rather than the physical or psychological determinants of the experience of disability. Disability Studies has been developed to disentangle impairments from the myths, ideology and stigma that influence social interaction and social policy. The scholarship challenges the idea that the economic and social statuses and the assigned roles of people with disabilities are the inevitable outcomes of their condition.

== Founding and history ==
The organization was founded in 1982 first as the Section for the Study of Chronic Illness, Impairment, and Disability (SSCIID), and renamed Society for Disability Studies in 1986. Its founders are Daryl Evans, Nora Groce, Steve Hey, Gary Kiger, John Seidel, Jessica Scheer and Irving Kenneth Zola (1935–1994). The Society for Disability Studies is a 501(c)(3) not-for-profit organization.

The Society maintains affiliation status with the Western Social Science Association (WSSA) through its Chronic Disease and Disability section. Currently, the SDS has hundreds of members both nationally and internationally who continue to make disability studies a part of academic conversations.

== Activities and publications ==
The Society for Disability Studies holds an annual conference in June and publishes a quarterly peer-reviewed journal, the Disability Studies Quarterly. The journal is published exclusively online. SDS has created a good model to follow when approaching publishers about their accessibility.

In 2015, Adam Newman organized the "Digital Access Facilitation Team" (DAFT) to make the 2015 annual conference of the Society for Disability Studies more accessible for a wider range of attendees. DAFT is coordinated by the Society's Student Caucus, whose members are a group of 25–30 students of SDS. Working in teams of two, members of DAFT were live-tweeting every session, contingent upon the consent of presenters. Live-tweeting all sessions and following standards for that emerging media, allowed a new way of producing accessibility for the disability community. In the Society for Disability Studies, there are a number of caucuses which "designate groups that are under-represented within society or SDS as an organization." DAFT is composed entirely of students (undergraduate, graduate, professional) who work on behalf of the interest and needs of students.

== Membership ==
There are several options for membership opportunities, even if someone is unable to pay the membership fees they will not be turned away; "No one is denied membership in SDS due to an inability to pay an established membership fee."

== Awards ==
Two awards have been established by the society "to honor individuals who have shown dedication to Disability studies": the Senior Scholar Award and the Irving K. Zola Award for Emerging Scholars in Disability Studies. The Senior Scholar Award is awarded to individuals who have made significant contributions to the field of disability studies. Past award winners: Devva Kasnitz (2014), Richard Scotch (2013), Carol Gill (2012), Tobin Siebers (2011), Rosemarie Garland Thomson (2010), Elizabeth Depoy and Stephen Gilson (2009), and Steven J. Taylor (2008). On the contrary, the Irving K. Zola Award for Emerging Scholars in Disability Studies is awarded to an up-and-coming individual who also has made significant contributions to the field of disability studies.

== Board of directors ==
2017–2018:

- President and Chairperson – Phil Smith
- Vice-chairperson – Joanne Woiak
- Treasurer – Carol Goldin
- Secretary – Katherine Caldwell

== List of SDS Presidents ==
Below is a list of the current and past presidents of the SDS.

Years active	Name
1986–89	Irving K. Zola (founder)
1989–1990	Daryl Evans (founder)
1990–91	Barbara Altman
1991–93	David Pfeiffer
1993–94	Sharon Barnartt
1994–95	Richard Scotch
1995–96	Corinne Kirchner
1996–98	Adrienne Asch
1998–2000	David Mitchell
2000–2002	Phil Ferguson
2002–05	Anne Finger
2005–06	Jim Ferris
2006	Corbett O'Toole
2006–07	Chris Bell
2006–08	Elaine Gerber
2008–09	Noam Ostrander
2009–2010	Pamela Block
2010–12	Devva Kasnitz
2012–14	Tammy Berberi
2014–15	Michael Rembis
2015–2016	Brenda Brueggemann
2016–2018	Phil Smith
2018-2020	Joanne Woiak
2020-2021	Holly Pearson and Suzanne Stolz
2021-2022	Karen Nakamura and Joe Stramondo
2022-2023	Matthew Wolf-Meyer

== See also ==
- International Classification of Functioning, Disability and Health
- Convention on the Rights of Persons with Disabilities
