= Disability in the media =

The depiction of disability in the media plays a major role in molding the public perception of disability. Perceptions portrayed in the media directly influence the way people with disabilities are treated in current society. "[Media platforms] have been cited as a key site for the reinforcement of negative images and ideas in regard to people with disabilities."

As a direct response, there have been increasing examples worldwide of people with disabilities pursuing their own media projects, such as creating film series centered on disability issues, radio programs and podcasts designed around and marketed towards those with disabilities, and so on.

== Common depictions ==
The media generally depicts people with disabilities according to common stereotypes such as pity and heroism. Disability advocates often call this type of societal situation the "pity/heroism trap" or "pity/heroism dichotomy" and call instead for its supporters to "Piss On Pity" and push forward with inclusion instead.

When reports are about the "plight of the disabled" they rely on the pity or medical model of disability. Telethons are an example of this, such as the Jerry Lewis MDA Telethon which has been heavily criticized and sometimes even physically protested by disability rights advocates.

Negative day-to-day reporting may occur chiefly by depicting a given person or people with a disability as a burden or drain on society.

The "super-crip" model, in which subjects are portrayed as heroically overcoming their conditions, is also often used when reporting on people with disabilities.

The social model tends to be used for reporting on the activities of disability rights activists if the report is positive.

The term "inspiration porn" was coined in 2012 by disability rights activist Stella Young in an editorial in Australian Broadcasting Corporation's webzine Ramp Up. The term describes when people with disabilities are called inspirational solely or in part on the basis of their disability.

Researchers note that information is prioritized for people with disabilities, with communication as a hard distinct second and entertainment is framed as a luxury.

=== Stereotypes and Tropes ===
Stereotypical depictions of disability that originate in the arts, film, literature, television, and other mass media fiction works, are frequently normalized through repetition to the general audience. Once such a stereotype is absorbed and accepted by the mainstream public, it continues to be repeated in the media, in many slightly varied forms, but staying close to the stereotype. Many media stereotypes about disability have been identified. They are sometimes referred to as "tropes", meaning a recurring image or representation in the mainstream culture that is widely recognizable. Tropes repeated in works of fiction have an influence on how society at large perceives people with disabilities. Other forms of media, in turn, then portray people with disabilities in ways that conform with tropes and repeat them.

Some of these disability tropes that have been identified in popular culture include:

- "Little People are Surreal"

The "Little People are Surreal" trope often plays on the use of dwarfism to enhance the fantasy aspect of the movie's universe. Examples of this include the character Tattoo on the television series Fantasy Island; a recurring use of a dwarf as a motif in American film director David Lynch's works, such as Mulholland Drive; and a dwarf actor who appears as a prominent cast extra in the film The Eyes of Laura Mars.

- "Single Episode Disability"

This is where a regular character on a television series obtains a temporary disability, learns a moral lesson, and makes a rapid, full recovery. Examples include episodes of M*A*S*H and Happy Days where Hawkeye and Fonzie are temporarily blinded, and an episode of Law and Order: SVU where Detective Stabler is temporarily blind.

- "Disability Superpower"

This is where fate removes one ability, it enhances another, so that a disabled character has one superpower. This has resulted in the creation of several subtypes of this disability trope, such as Blind Seer, Blind Weapon Master, Genius Cripple and Super Wheel Chair.

Sometimes, characters that are given a disability are only seen as their disability. Through the medical model, their disability is explained and narrated in a WebMD style. This disability stereotype, as Jay Timothy Dolmage describes it, is known as the "Disability as Pathology" myth. It is harmful because it feeds into the idea that disabled people are their disability first before their personhood.

Other disability stereotypes that have been identified in popular culture include:

- The object of pity

The "object a pity" trope is where disabled people are used to inspire bodied people to achieving their goals, which is coined as Inspiration porn. With this, disability is commonly associated with an illness or disease. Examples include Auggie in the film Wonder (film), or Tiny Tim in A Christmas Carol.

- Sinister or evil

Characters who are portrayed as having physical disabilities are cast as the anti-hero, such as in the films Ant-Man and the Wasp (the character Ghost) and Split.

- Eternal innocence

Eternal innocence, paired with people with intellectual disabilities, such as in the films Forrest Gump, I Am Sam and Rain Man are given a childlike mentality.

- The victim of violence

This is the trope in where a recently disabled individual cannot accept their new life and attempts to reverse their disability. This cliché is often connected to the "object of pity" trope and inspiration porn.

- Asexual, undesirable, or incapable of sexual or romantic interactions:

Like "Eternal Innocence" disabled individuals are seen with an innocent childlike mentality and therefore have no sexual desires. Examples include adolescent coming-of-age storylines such as Artie Abrams on Glee, and "teen sick-lit" such as The Fault in our Stars.

- Disability con:

The "disability con" or "disability faker" is not disabled but pretends to have a disability for profit or personal gain. Examples include the character Verbal Kint in the film The Usual Suspects, who fakes a limp in order to take advantage of others, and is shown at the end walking out of the police station scot-free, and without the limp.

While there are con artists who fake a disability such as Belle Gibson, they are rare, while people with genuine disabilities are relatively common. Media, and especially current affairs reporting, that focuses on the few fraudulent fake-disabled people while ignoring or systematically under-representing the many genuinely disabled people creates a misperception of disabled people which encourages negative stereotyping. This is especially problematic for people with hidden disabilities, who may be disbelieved and abused by members of the public for "faking it," as they believe that disability fakers are more common than genuine disabilities. One example is wheelchair users not being able to walk.

The existence of disability tropes in mass media is related to other stereotypes, or tropes, that have developed when other marginalized groups in society are depicted, such as the Magical Negro trope identified, and criticized, by film director Spike Lee. The mocking names often given to these tropes when they are identified indicates a rejection of the harmful stereotypes that they propagate.

Stereotypes may endure in a culture for several reasons: they are constantly reinforced in the culture, which mass media does easily and effectively; they reflect a common human need to organize people and categorize them; they reinforce discrimination that allows one group of society to exploit and marginalize another group. Several studies of mass media in Britain and the United States have identified common stereotypes, such as "noble warrior", "charity cripple", "curio", "freak", and "Pollyanna", where the researchers identified a position of "disapproval", on the part of the media, of some aspect of the disability. It has been shown that media portrayals of disability became more normalizing and accepting in the years immediately after World War II, when returning veterans with war-related disabilities were being reintegrated into society. A backlash of intolerance towards disability followed during the mid-20th century, with some researchers speculating that this may have been related to society's reaction against any identifiable "difference" as a result of Cold War tensions. Depictions of disability in media soon reverted to emphasizing the "freakish" nature of disability.

== Broadcast media programming for disabled audiences ==
Broadcast media has in recent years begun to recognize the large audience of people with disabilities that it reaches. Programming dedicated to disability issues is increasing.

In 1990, the signing of the Americans with Disabilities Act (ADA) became the first news story on disability issues to become a lead story on cable news broadcaster CNN. News Director Ed Turner contacted the Washington bureau of CNN to have the signing of the ADA by President Bush broadcast live. The next day, the signing of the ADA was covered as the top headline in The New York Times, The Washington Post, and every other major U.S. newspaper. Disability rights activist Lex Frieden has stated, "That was the first time that millions of people were exposed to disability rights as the number one story". These milestones were a major change in reducing exclusion and invisibility for people with disabilities.

Ouch! by the British Broadcasting Corporation, The Largest Minority broadcast in New York City, and Dtv presented in sign language on SABC television in South Africa, are examples of programming produced for, and usually also by, people with disabilities.

Radio reading services are radio stations that broadcast readings from newspapers, magazines and books to mainly blind or partially sighted audiences.

In recent years, some mainstream publications and broadcasters have added writing and programming about disability-related topics. The Creative Diversity Network in the United Kingdom is an organization that advocates increased cultural and disability-related programming. Clare Morrow, the organization's Network Manager, states that "Disability is now at the heart of the diversity agenda for all of the UK's main television companies, thanks to their collective work". The BBC Website includes Ouch!, a disability news and discussion blog and internet talk show program.

== Publications and broadcasts by disability related organisations ==
Many activist and charitable organisations have websites and publish their own magazines or newsletters.

== Disability in documentary film ==
Disability has been shown to audiences since the early days of documentary film. Educational silent films showing hospital patients with various disabling conditions were shown to medical and nursing students. Films of schizophrenia patients with symptoms of catatonia, World War I veterans with extreme posttraumatic stress disorder (PTSD) (shell-shock) symptoms, and many other such films survive today. Michael J. Dowling (1866–1921) was a prominent Minnesota politician and newspaper publisher, who was also a quadruple amputee. World War I inspired him to further the cause of veterans with disabilities. Dowling had himself filmed performing routine tasks on his own, and had the films screened for groups such as the American Medical Association in 1918. His efforts promoted the rehabilitation of physically disabled people.

Documentary films sometimes had a tone that was a reflection of the public's morbid curiosity about visible disabilities that were considered shameful and ordinarily were hidden from public view. Nazi propagandists exploited this fear and prejudice to push the public to accept their euthanasia policies, including forcible sterilization, by screening films showing people with intellectual and physical disabilities living in squalid conditions. At the same time, American President Franklin D. Roosevelt and his White House staff made a great effort to disguise his disability (Roosevelt became paraplegic after contracting polio as an adult). Roosevelt was photographed and filmed only from positions that would hide his disability from the public, for fear that he would be perceived as weak.

More recently, documentary films about disability have been widely viewed on both public and cable television programming. The Channel 5 (UK) program Extraordinary Lives, and Channel 4 program Body Shock in the United Kingdom, broadcast much documentary material about disability. Titles of some documentary programming includes: "The Boy Who Sees Without Eyes — the 14-year-old American boy who navigates by sound; The Twin Within the Twin — the 34-year-old Bengali who carries his foetal twin within his abdomen; and The Twins Who Share a Body — Abby and Brittany Hensel, the world's only known dicephalus twins, ie. two heads with one body". Some of the documentaries, perceived to be in the "shock doc" (shock documentary) genre, have been denounced by critics with disabilities. Although the documentary programming contains educational and scientific information, the sensationalized, overt emotional appeal of the "tabloid tone" of the programming has raised objections. Laurence Clark has written in the BBC Website's disability blog Ouch!:

During these programs I often find myself screaming at the TV: 'Where the hell do they find these people?!' I suspect that someone somewhere has set up an agency called Rent-a-Freak, specifically to supply the most bizarre, eccentric disabled people they can find to budding documentary makers. But unlike today's documentary subjects, the freaks of old were at least paid to take part — and had some say over their performances.

== Documentary photography ==
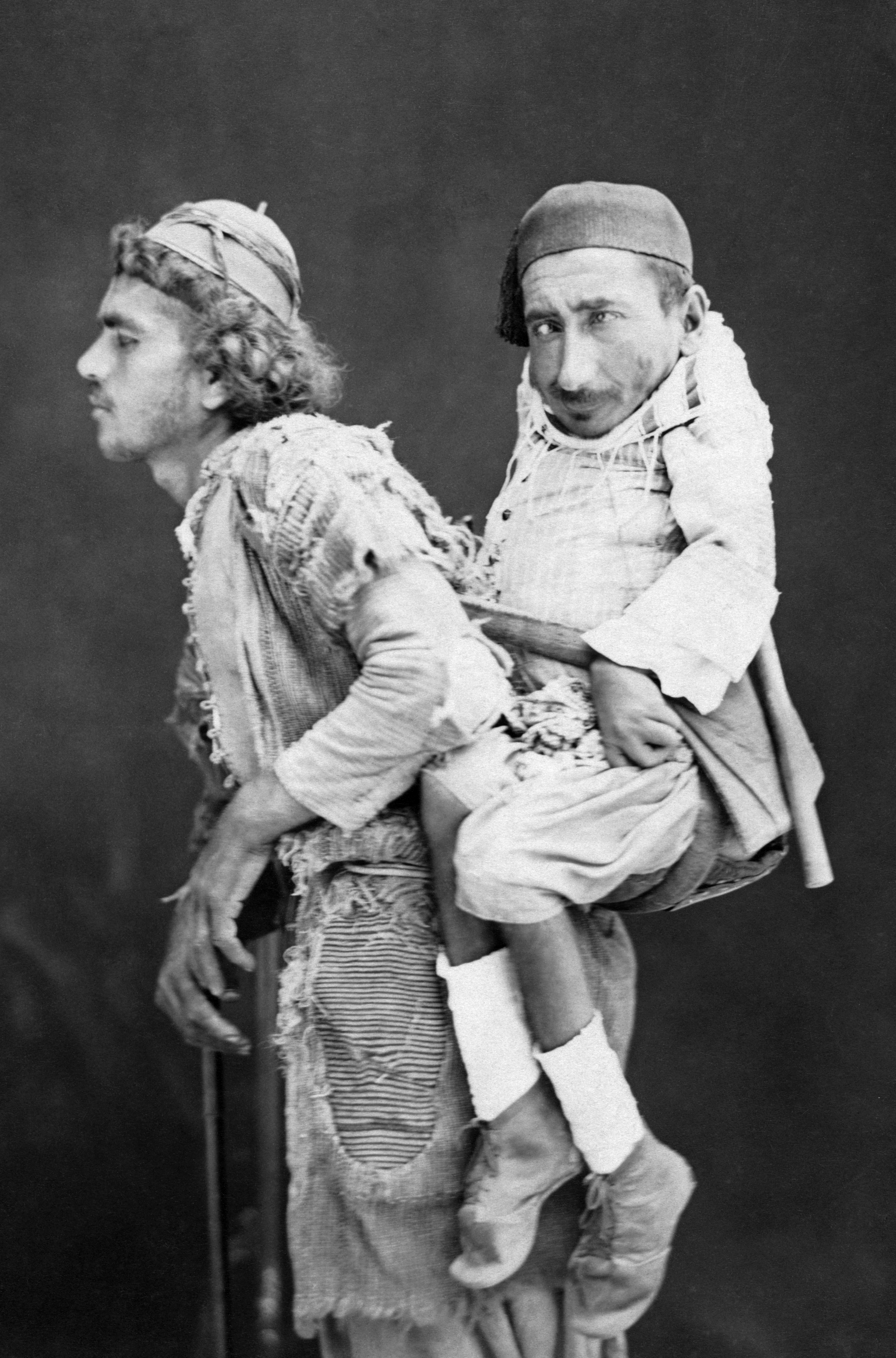
A blind man carrying a paralyzed man on his back in the Levant, photo by Tancrède Dumas, circa 1889.

The first photographer to become widely known for depicting the visibly disabled was Diane Arbus, active in the 1950s and 1960s. Her photographs, which are in fact art photographs, have been, and remain, highly controversial.

American documentary photographers Tom Olin and Harvey Finkle, known for documenting the disability rights movement since the 1980s, have exhibited at many venues including the National Constitution Center Museum.

== Responses ==
Members of the public with disabilities have criticized media depictions of disability on the grounds that stereotypes are commonly repeated. Media coverage that is "negative", "unrealistic", or displays a preference for the "pitiful" and "sensationalistic" over the "everyday and human side of disability" are identified at the root of the dissatisfaction. Journalist Leye Jeannette Chrzanowski, who uses a wheelchair, has written:

Many people with disabilities believe mainstream journalists are incapable of accurately covering stories about them. Generally, journalists either portray us as pitiful cripples, super achievers, or insane mental patients. These erroneous media stereotypes of people with disabilities are perpetuated because journalists consistently fail to understand or learn about people with disabilities and the issues that are important to us.

Various organisations and programmes have been established to try to positively influence the frequency and quality of reporting on disability issues. By 2000, it was estimated that in the United States, there were between 3000 and 3500 newsletters, 200 magazines, and 50 to 60 newspapers regularly published that focussed on disability issues.

== Disability in Social Media Platforms ==
Social media is a tool used to connect disabled individuals with similar interests and experiences. Online forums and chat rooms therefore work as a connector for example people with impaired hearing are able to connect with those who many not know how American Sign Language. Social media has also been used as an educational tool to teach others about the disabled community, how to better accommodate and find treatment or aid. In these cases social media has been a way to reduce isolation and reduce stereotypes made about disabled individuals.

== Contemporary examples of disability in media ==
These examples provide a sample of contemporary representations of disability in the media that include authentic and incidental portrayal of disability by disabled actors and professionals.

=== Film and TV ===
- A Quiet Place: Millicent Simmonds, a deaf actor, played Regan Abbott, a deaf character in the film A Quiet Place.
- Bridgerton: Season three introduced two exemplary examples of incidental disability portrayal by Deaf actor Sophie Woolley as Lady Stowell and disabled actor Zak Ford-Williams as Lord Remington.
- Crip Camp: Many people with disabilities were interviewed and featured in the documentary Crip Camp, including James Lebrecht, Ann Cupolo Freeman, Judy Huemann, and Dennis Billups, among others.
- Breaking Bad: RJ Mitte plays rebellious teenage son Walter "Flynn" White Jr., who has cerebral palsy.
- Code of Silence: A deaf woman seeks employment being a lip reader for the police and meets a range of people along the way.
- Special: A man with cerebal palsy, pursuing new friendships, relationships and self-sufficiency.
- Speechless: the sitcom explores the serious and humorous challenges a family faces with a teenager with a cerebal palsy
- CODA: Oscar winning movie about a hearing child of a deaf family coming-of-age.

=== Stage Production ===
Theatre and disability has grown as a movement and portrayal of disabled characters is subject to greater scrutiny. Disabled actors are more commonly authentically cast, reclaiming disabled stories, bringing authenticity, subtext and a postmodern perspective of disability in performance.

- Beauty and the Beast: Evan Ruggerio, a deaf actor, portrayed Beast in the stage production of Disney's Beauty and the Beast.
- Hunchback of Notre Dame: John McGinty, a deaf actor, portrayed Quasimodo, a character originally written as deaf in the novel, in the stage production of Hunchback of Notre Dame.
- Richard III: has now been played by several disabled actors including: Mat Fraser, Peter Dinklage, Tom Mothersdale, Arthur Hughes, Michael Patrick Thornton, the similarly named Michael Patrick and Zak Ford-Williams.
- The Glass Menagerie: Madison Ferris portrayed Laura Wingfield in The Glass Menagerie on Broadway. Despite one of Laura's legs being malformed and in a brace, Madison is one of the first disabled actors cast in the role.

=== TED Talks ===
- I got 99 problems … palsy is just one: Maysoon Zayid, an Arab-American comedian, captures snippets of her adventures as an actress, stand-up comic, philanthropist and disability rights advocate.
- Our fight for disability rights — and why we're not done yet: Judy Heumann, a disability rights activist, tells stories of Section 504 protest sit-ins and gives context on the current state of disability rights activism.

=== Podcasts ===
- Disability After Dark: A podcast hosted by Disability Awareness Consultant Andrew Gurza, with a focus on disability topics not commonly discussed.
- Power not Pity: A podcast that amplifies the stories and perspectives of disabled people of color.
- StutterTalk: A podcast hosted by (and featuring) people who stutter with a focus on stuttering topics.
- Invalid Culture: A podcast dedicated to excavating the strangest and most baffling representations of disability in popular culture.

== Types of depictions ==
=== Disabled villain ===
One common form of media depiction of disability is to portray villains with a mental or physical disability. Lindsey Row-Heyveld notes, for instance, "that villainous pirates are scraggly, wizened and inevitably kitted out with a peg leg, eye patch or hook hand, whereas heroic pirates look like Johnny Depp's Jack Sparrow". The disability of the villain is meant to separate them from the average viewer and dehumanize the antagonist. As a result, stigma forms surrounding the disability and the individuals that live with it.

There are many instances in literature where the antagonist is depicted as having a disability or mental illness.

=== Inspiration porn ===
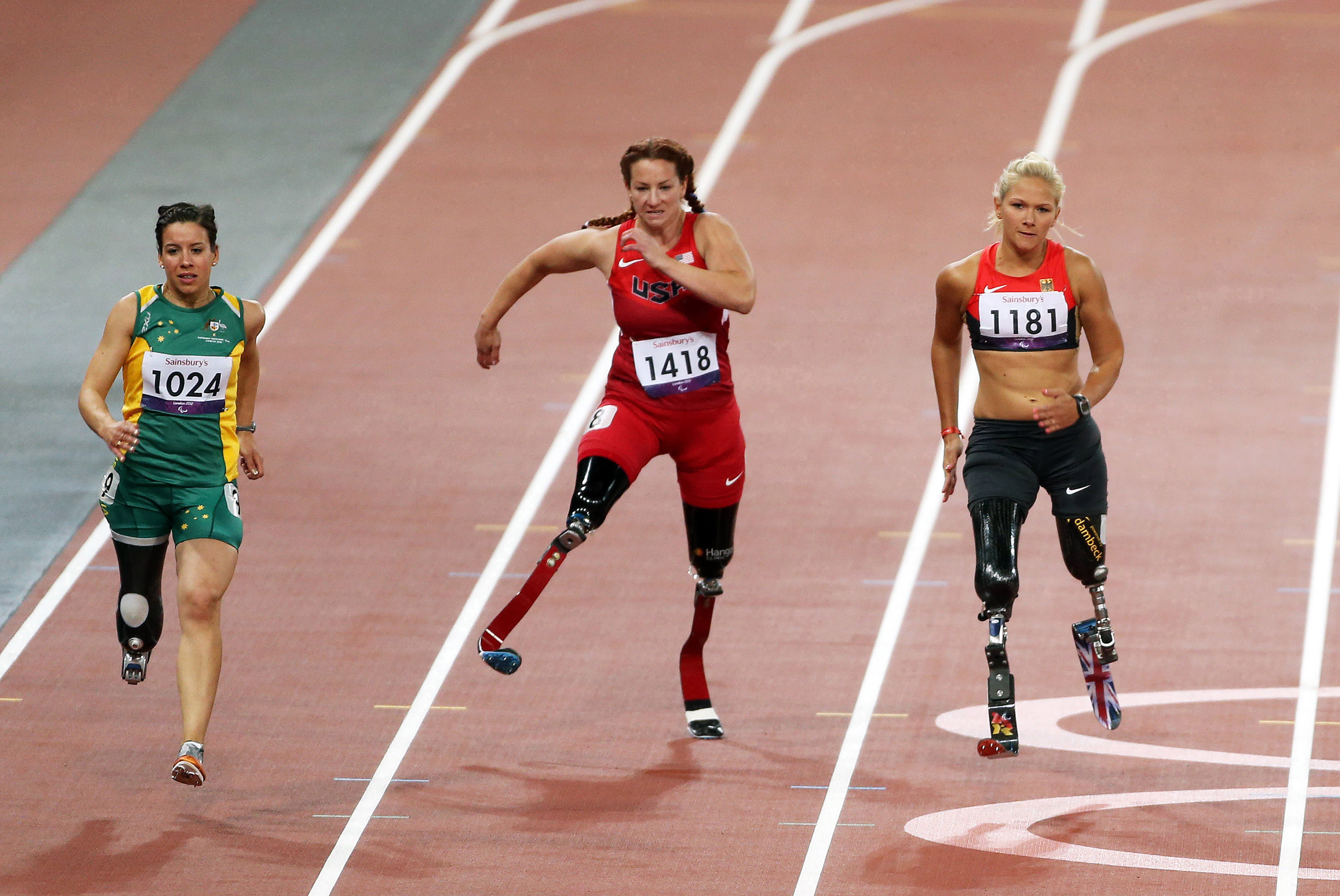
Michelle Errichiello, Katy Sullivan, and Vanessa Low competing for Australia, the United States, and Germany in the Women's 100-meter sprint at the 2012 Summer Paralympic Games in London.

Inspiration porn is the use of disabled people performing ordinary tasks as a form of inspiration. Criticisms of inspiration porn say that it distances disabled people from individuals who are not disabled and portrays disability as an obstacle to overcome or rehab.

One of the most common examples of inspiration porn includes the Paralympics. Athletes with disabilities often get praised as inspirational because of their athletic accomplishments. Critics of this type of inspiration porn have said, "athletic accomplishments by these athletes are oversimplified as 'inspirational' because they're such a surprise."

=== Pitied character ===
In many forms of media such as films and articles a disabled person is portrayed as a character who is viewed as less than able, different, and an "outcast." Hayes and Black (2003) explore Hollywood films as the discourse of pity towards disability as a problem of social, physical, and emotional confinement. The aspect of pity is heightened through the storylines of media focusing on the individual's weaknesses as opposed to strengths and therefore leaving audiences a negative and ableist portrayal towards disability.

=== Supercrip stereotype ===
The supercrip narrative is generally a story of a person with an apparent disability who is able to "overcome" their physical differences and accomplish an impressive task. Professor Thomas Hehir's "Eliminating Ableism in Education" gives the story of a blind man who climbs Mount Everest, Erik Weihenmayer, as an example of the supercrip narrative.

The Paralympics are another example of the supercrip stereotype since they generate a large amount of media attention and demonstrate disabled people doing extremely strenuous physical tasks. Although that may appear inspiring at face value, Hehir explains that many people with disabilities view those news stories as setting unrealistic expectations. Additionally, Hehir mentions that supercrip stories imply that disabled people are required to perform those impressive tasks to be seen as an equal and to avoid pity from those without disabilities.

The disability studies scholar Alison Kafer describes how those narratives reinforce the problematic idea that disability can be overcome by an individual's hard work, in contrast to other theories, such as those that view disability as the result of societal structure. Supercrip stories reinforce ableism by emphasizing independence, reliance on one's body, and the role of individual will in self-cure.

Other examples of the supercrip narrative include the stories of Rachael Scdoris, the first blind woman to race in the Iditarod, and Aron Ralston, who has continued to climb after the amputation of his arm.

=== Environmental and outdoor recreation media ===
Disability has often been used as a short-hand in environmental literature for representing distance from nature, in what Sarah Jaquette Ray calls the "disability-equals-alienation-from-nature trope." An example of this trope can be seen in Moby Dick, as Captain Ahab's lost leg symbolizes his exploitative relationship with nature. Additionally, in canonical environmental thought, figures such as Ralph Waldo Emerson and Edward Abbey wrote using metaphors of disability to describe relationships between nature, technology, and the individual.

Ableism in outdoor media can also be seen in promotional materials from the outdoor recreation industry: Alison Kafer highlighted a 2000 Nike advertisement, which ran in eleven outdoor magazines promoting a pair of running shoes. Kafer alleged that the advertisement depicted a person with a spinal cord injury and a wheelchair user as a "drooling, misshapen, non-extreme-trail-running husk of [their] former self", and said that the advertisement promised non-disabled runners and hikers the ability to protect their bodies against disability by purchasing the pair of shoes. The advertisement was withdrawn after the company received over six hundred complaints in the first two days after its publication, and Nike apologized.

== See also ==
- Disability in the arts
- Disability on Stage
- Autistic art
- Cultural depictions of blind people
- Cultural depictions of dwarfism
- National Center on Disability and Journalism
- Sign-language media
