= Crip (disability term) =

Slang term referring to disabled people

Crip, slang for cripple, is a term in the process of being reclaimed by disabled people. Wright State University suggests that the current community definition of crip includes people who experience any form of disability, such as one or more impairments with physical, mental, learning, and sensory, though the term primarily targets physical and mobility impairment. People might identify as a crip for many reasons. Some of these reasons are to show pride, to talk about disability rights, or avoid ranking types of disability.

The term cripple is attested in English from as early as 950 CE. While cripple appeared to describe someone with a physical disability, it eventually became a slur focused on people deemed ugly due to a physical disability. The use of crip, as a slur, was not limited to people. Emily Hutcheon and Gregor Wolbring stated that crip could be used for 'an action/event/object/person' that did not meet its intended purpose. By the 1920s crip was being used as slang for 'easy'.

With the rise of the disability rights movement in the 1960s came the idea of disability pride; a movement to shed the feelings of shame that society had forced on people with disabilities. Part of the process of disability pride was reclaiming words used to shame the disability community. Thus, crip's new meaning developed as an 'insider' term within the disability rights movement.

Crip theory began in communities and is an academic theory that intersects with experiences like race, class or gender. Other crip theories are crip time, which has roots in both the disability community and academic theory (through crip futurity).

== History ==
Crip is a slang term for the word cripple. The origins of cripple come from two Old English words, crypel and crēopel. These terms have Germanic roots in krupilaz which meant to 'creep'. Crypel and crēopel could be used to describe people or places. When directed towards people crypel denoted a disability, being of small stature, or could be a surname. In relation to a place, crypel could be used to denote a small opening. In the context of a place cryple was used along with other words to create the name.

The earliest written usage of cripple is dated at 950 ADE in the Lindisfarne Gospels. In this context, cripple was used to describe people who have difficulty walking, such as people with physical disabilities. While the term cripple was in common usage, it could often be found in the literature to describe characters who had issues with walking, or difficulty using their limbs. In 1893, novelist Owen Wister referred to a character who was shot in the leg as "Crip Jones".

By the 1920s crip took on new meaning, though still appears to be connected to disability. During this time crip began being used as a slang term for "easy", which may have reflected society's low expectations of disabled people (an easy pitch in baseball was a "baseball crip", and an easy course in school was a "crip course").

Because of these new usages of the terms cripple and crip, moving from descriptive to derogatory, cripple and crip are defined as dated and offensive terms. These terms have been used pejoratively as a negative term and an insult.

=== Disability rights movement ===
During the 1960s, the disability rights movements began to gain momentum. A component of this movement was creating a sense of disability pride, which aimed to stop feeling shame as a result of the disabilities. It is here when the term crip began being reclaimed. The reclaiming process was bolstered by the introduction of the social model of disability in the 1970s, which was adopted by the UN in the 1980s.

Crip has continued in common usage within the disability community, though the term has broadened to include people with any form of disability, not just those with physical impairments. Some social movements that employ the term crip are #CripTheVote, Crip Camp, and Toronto-based Crip Rave. The reclaiming of the term crip has had wider impacts as seen through the artistic movement like Krip Hop Nation, cripitiques and Crip Collectives (disability writers collectives), and documentary films like Fixed and Crip Camp.

Crip is sometimes used as a proper noun, "Crip", and sometimes even as a verb, in which "cripping" something means applying a disability justice lens to it. In this and many ways, the reclaiming of "crip" mirrors the reclaiming of queer. People with disabilities deem crip an insider term as they are the group changing the meaning and usage of the word.

"Cripping-up" is a term that has been adopted by both the mainstream media and creative industries and relates to a form of disability talent erasure, where actors without visible disabilities are cast in roles to play disabled fictional characters or historical figures.

== Purpose ==
Those who identify as crips use the term for various reasons:

- To express pride in being a member of the disability community ("crip pride" or crip punk)
- To express resilience in crips' struggle for rights and equity and their resistance against ableism and oppression
- To have a unified term for all kinds of disabilities, thus avoiding disability hierarchy (the attitude that people with some types of disabilities are more or less important than people with others)
- To disempower the term's historical pejorative usages
- To identify other crips who themselves identify as crips

== Crip theory ==
Due to the influence of the disability rights movement, there were new ways of understanding disability. For instance, the social model was introduced by disability rights organisations in the 1970s. With the work of activist scholars like Mike Oliver understandings from the community, like that of the social model of disability, entered academia. These new ways of understanding disability created a new academic area of study, called disability studies. Within disability studies, crip theory formed. Crip theory was a way to explore the experience of disability, acknowledge the history of exclusion of the disability community and other social barriers related to disability. Crip theory developed within this field as an intersection with gender and sexuality and fell within what is known as critical disability studies. While crip was developed by communities to understand their oppression from a disability perspective crip might change when it enters academic spaces.

For example, crip time is a concept that began in communities. This idea suggests that our society has ideas about how long and how much energy and resources a task will take. When these ideas were made they were based on an able-bodied person. Being able-bodied means that you have minimal impairments physically, mentally, or sensory or not identifying as having a disability. Due to the assumption of able-bodiedness there is a lack of consideration of the time, energy, or resources needed for people with disabilities. It is common for a disabled person to require more time and energy, different resources, or assistance from another person to complete a task. These accommodations often require extra planning and consideration on behalf of the disabled person to be able to participate in work and life. When some people with disabilities extend themselves, they pay with exhaustion, pain, or difficulties focusing. Some disabled people use spoon theory to talk about the way they have to manage resources.

Academic views of crip time connected to ideas of futurity, which is based on temporal theory. This theory, developed by Alison Kafer in Feminist, Queer, Crip, builds on the work queer temporal theory. Crip time theory asks us to think about the connections between time, marginalisation, and visibility. Or how we imagine in our histories and futures. It is argued that people with disabilities (and other marginalised identities) are made invisible from our past and futures. When we remove people with disabilities from our histories and imagined futures, we must also wonder why policies, laws, and communities would take the needs of disabled people into account.

== Controversy ==
The reclaiming of "crip" is not universally accepted by disabled people. There are several critiques about trying to reclaim crip. Some think that reclaiming the term crip continues to put people with disabilities in relation to able-bodiless, which is argued can maintain harmful views of disabled people. Others object to using crip because this term, and cripple, can still be used as a slur.

There have been concerns broached that crip is close to Crips, which is a street gang in the United States.

Some claim that the reclaiming of the word crip is done by privileged people, often white and within academia. They critique the right of privileged people engaged in the process of reclaiming when the needs and wants of disadvantaged people with disabilities are not taken into account. Those with this stance argue that, as Kirstin Marie Bone says, crip theory 'silences actual disabled experience and fractures the community, harming instead of helping'. There are also calls from people about how the reclaiming and understandings of disability that happens through crip creates space for people to explore intersectionality with race, class or other forms of oppression.
