= Inspiration porn =

Ableist portrayal of disabled people

An image showing many different statements people can say about a disabled person to show how "inspirational" they are

Inspiration porn is the objectification of disabled people as inspirations to non-disabled people on the basis of their life circumstances. The term inspiration porn is by analogy with pornography, in that the material is perceived as objectifying disabled people so that the non-disabled audience can achieve gratification. Inspiration porn may be seen as a form of ableism. An example of inspiration porn might be a photo of a child with a disability taking part in an ordinary activity, with captions targeted towards non-disabled people such as "your excuse is invalid", "before you quit, try" or "they didn't let their disability stop them".

== Origin ==
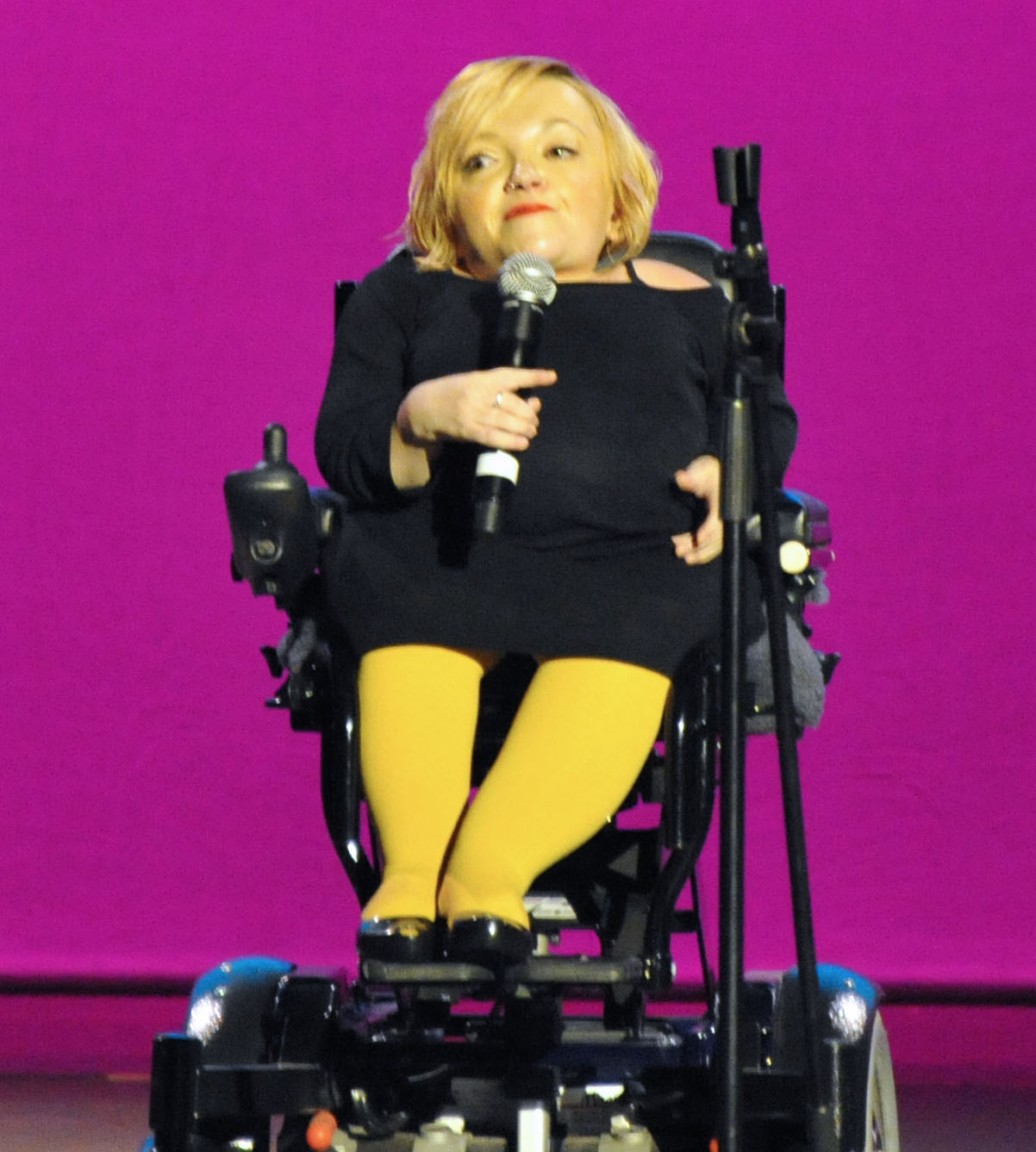
Stella Young, who coined the phrase, pictured 2012

The term was coined in 2012 by disability rights activist Stella Young in an editorial in Australian Broadcasting Corporation's webzine Ramp Up and further explored in her TEDx Talk. About her decisions in naming inspiration porn, Young stated: "I use the term porn deliberately because of the objectification of one group of people for the benefit of another group of people." She rejected the idea that disabled people's otherwise ordinary activities should be considered extraordinary solely because of disability.

== Criticism ==
Criticisms of inspiration porn include that it "others" disabled people, that it portrays disability as a burden (as opposed to focusing on the societal obstacles that disabled people face), and that reducing disabled people to inspirations dehumanizes them, and makes them exceptionalist examples. Inspiration porn itself reinforces the stereotypes society has given disabled individuals: that they are "unable" and "less competent" than those who do not have disabilities. After watching a 2016 advertisement titled We're the Superhumans from the Summer Paralympics in Rio de Janeiro, which showed a variety of disabled people accomplishing tasks in athletics, music, the household and more, alongside the repeated message of "Yes I can", a response group of disabled viewers felt it generally exploited disabled people for the pleasure and comfort of the non-disabled.

In 2014, disabled actress Amelia Cavallo described inspiration porn imagery as being "the visualization of disabled people overcoming what seem like broken and substandard bodies, sensory and cognitive make ups" to make "the non-disabled public feel good about their unbroken, able bodies, senses, and cognition." Forms of inspiration porn ostracize individuals and reduce their identity to their disability alone. The focus on a single narrative – that disabled people are always inspirational – contributes to a lack of accurate understandings of disability identities and to a widespread, unrealistic expectation of heroism that disabled people should live up to.

The cripple punk movement, established in 2014, directly opposes the portrayal of disabled people as inspiration porn by refusing to conform to normative aesthetic and moral standards, not needing to be "good" to deserve the conditional support of non-disabled people, and reclaiming the slang crip.

== See also ==
- Disability in the media
- Just-world fallacy
- Poverty porn
- Rugged individualism
- Supercrip stereotype
- Survivorship bias
