= Cripple punk =

Social movement for disability rights

The cripple punk movement, also known as cpunk, crippunk, or cr*pple punk, is a social movement regarding physical disability rights that rejects inspirational portrayals of those with physical disabilities on the sole basis of their physical disability.

Started by Tyler Trewhella in 2014 on Tumblr, the movement draws inspiration from ideas and values of the punk subculture. It challenges the idea that people with physical disabilities need to appear morally good to deserve the conditional support of able-bodied people, and instead advocates for the solidarity of physically disabled people who appear not to conform to normative standards through their appearance, body size, dress, use of a mobility aid, drug use, or physical deformity.

== Origins ==
The cripple punk tag was started in 2014 by a Tumblr user Tyler Trewhella who posted a picture standing with a cane and a lit cigarette, with the caption "cripple punk" layered over the top, and the description "I'm starting a movement." The post would go on to be liked and reblogged by over 40,000 people, with the caption being used as a tag to boost other posts and images of physically disabled people going against the typical perception of people with physical disabilities.

== Ideology ==
Cripple punk ideology centers and prioritizes the experiences of physically disabled people over the pressure to conform to the standards that able-bodied people uphold. The movement is made explicitly by and for people with physical disabilities and aims to depict how they navigate the world, as opposed to able-bodied people. Participation is not contingent on people being comfortable with using the word cripple, and alternative spellings or censoring is accepted. The movement tries to change ideas that people with physical disabilities need to be entirely unproblematic, without fault, and give all of their energy to trying to act or look less disabled; or that of physically disabled people being either a source of inspiration or that of pity. Instead, it focuses on basic survival and quality of life improvement for physically disabled people through the support and solidarity of other physically disabled people. It also supports unlearning forms of internalized ableism, and those who are going through the process of doing so.

== Music ==
Several bands are associated with the Cripple punk scene, including Wheelchair Sports Camp of Denver, CO, which is fronted by Kalyn Heffernan who was born with the genetic disorder osteogenesis imperfecta. These artists vary in alternative genres but generally advocate for and represent the lives of cripples. Las Vegas-based punk band Wheelchair Mosh Pit donates 10% of their merchandise sales and streaming revenue to the Nevada chapter of the Wheelchair Foundation, a group that works to distribute wheelchairs to those without access. While focusing on inclusion and the struggles of crippled life, these bands also feature songs about partying, in accordance with the ideology that disabled people are not fragile and shouldn't be accepted solely on the condition of appearing virtuous.

Pertti Kurikan Nimipäivät, a Finnish punk band made up entirely of developmentally disabled performers, represented Finland in the Eurovision Song Contest in 2015. The Punk Syndrome, a 2012 documentary, followed the band on an international tour and reflected the challenges and frustrations encountered by disabled people in music and in their everyday lives.

Another notable contemporary example is hardcore punk band Special Forces 805 from San Luis Obispo, CA having experienced rapid success after the release of their debut album “I’m Retarded, You’re Fucking Stupid” in March 2026.

== See also ==
- Inspiration porn
- Disability pride
- Crip (disability term)
