= Box cutter (disambiguation) =

A box cutter is a type of utility knife.

"Box cutter", "Boxcutter", or "Boxcutters" may refer to:

- "Box Cutter" (Breaking Bad), an episode of TV series Breaking Bad
- Boxcutter (musician), an electronic musician from Northern Ireland
- Boxcutter Pazzy, alias of Italian American rapper Vinnie Paz
- Boxcutters (podcast), an Australian podcast
