= Deafness =

Inability to hear

Deafness has varying definitions in cultural and medical contexts. In medical contexts, the meaning of deafness is hearing loss that precludes a person from understanding spoken language, an audiological condition. In this context, it is written with a lower case d. It later came to be used in a cultural context to refer to those who primarily communicate with through sign language regardless of hearing ability, often capitalized as Deaf and referred to as "big D Deaf" in speech and sign. The two definitions overlap but are not identical, as hearing loss includes cases that are not severe enough to impact spoken language comprehension, while cultural Deafness includes hearing people who use a sign language, such as children of Deaf adults. When talking about deafness in both senses of the word, it can be written as d/Deafness or D/deafness.

== Medical context ==
The International Symbol for Deafness is used to identify facilities with hearing augmentation services, especially assistive listening devices.

In a medical context, deafness is defined as a degree of hearing difficulties such that a person is unable to understand speech, even in the presence of amplification. In profound deafness, even the loudest sounds produced by an audiometer (an instrument used to measure hearing by producing pure tone sounds through a range of frequencies) may not be perceived by the person. In total deafness, no sounds at all, regardless of amplification or method of production, can be heard.

Neurologically, language is processed in the same brain areas whether one is deaf or hearing. The left hemisphere of the brain processes linguistic patterns whether by signed languages or by spoken languages.

Deafness can be broken down into four different types of hearing loss:

- conductive hearing loss,
- sensorineural hearing loss,
- mixed hearing loss, and
- auditory neuropathy spectrum disorder.

All of these forms of hearing loss impair a person's hearing; they are unable to perceive or interpret sounds correctly. These different types of hearing loss occur in different parts of the ear, which makes it difficult for the information heard to reach the brain properly.

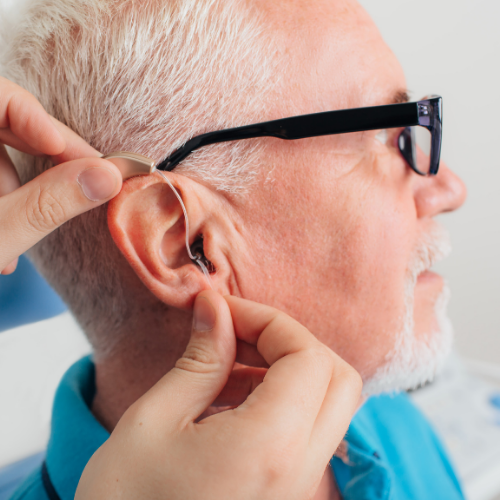
Hearing aids help people who struggle to understand spoken conversations.

For each of these types, there are four different levels or amounts of hearing loss. The first level is mild hearing loss. This is when someone can still hear noises, but it is more difficult to hear the softer sounds. The second level is moderate hearing loss, and this is when someone can hear almost nothing when someone is talking to them at a normal volume. The next level is severe hearing loss. Severe hearing loss is when someone can not hear any sounds when they are being produced at a normal level, and they can only hear minimal sounds that are being produced at a loud level. The final level is profound hearing loss, which is when someone is not able to hear any sounds except for very loud ones.

Millions of people globally live with deafness or hearing impairments. The 2005 Survey of Income and Program Participation (SIPP) indicated that fewer than 5% of Americans is DHH (deaf or hard of hearing) at a level that makes normal conversations difficult to hear; more than half of these people are over retirement age.

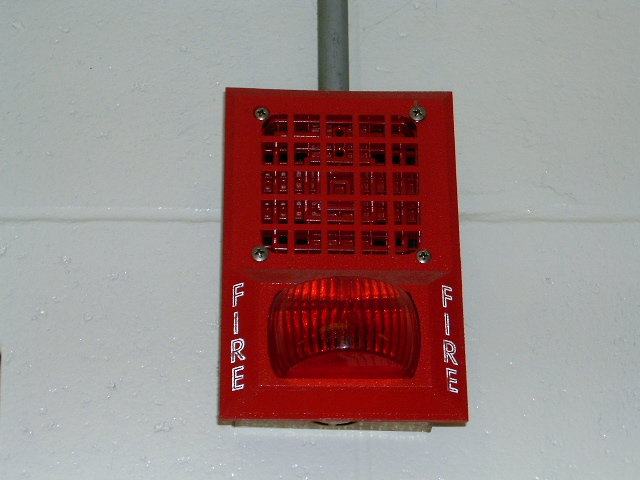
This fire alarm uses a flashing red light to alert people who cannot hear.

Several solutions are available for many people with hearing impairments. Hearing aids are a common device. Additionally, people may use devices that use blinking lights instead of noises for alarm clocks or other notifications.

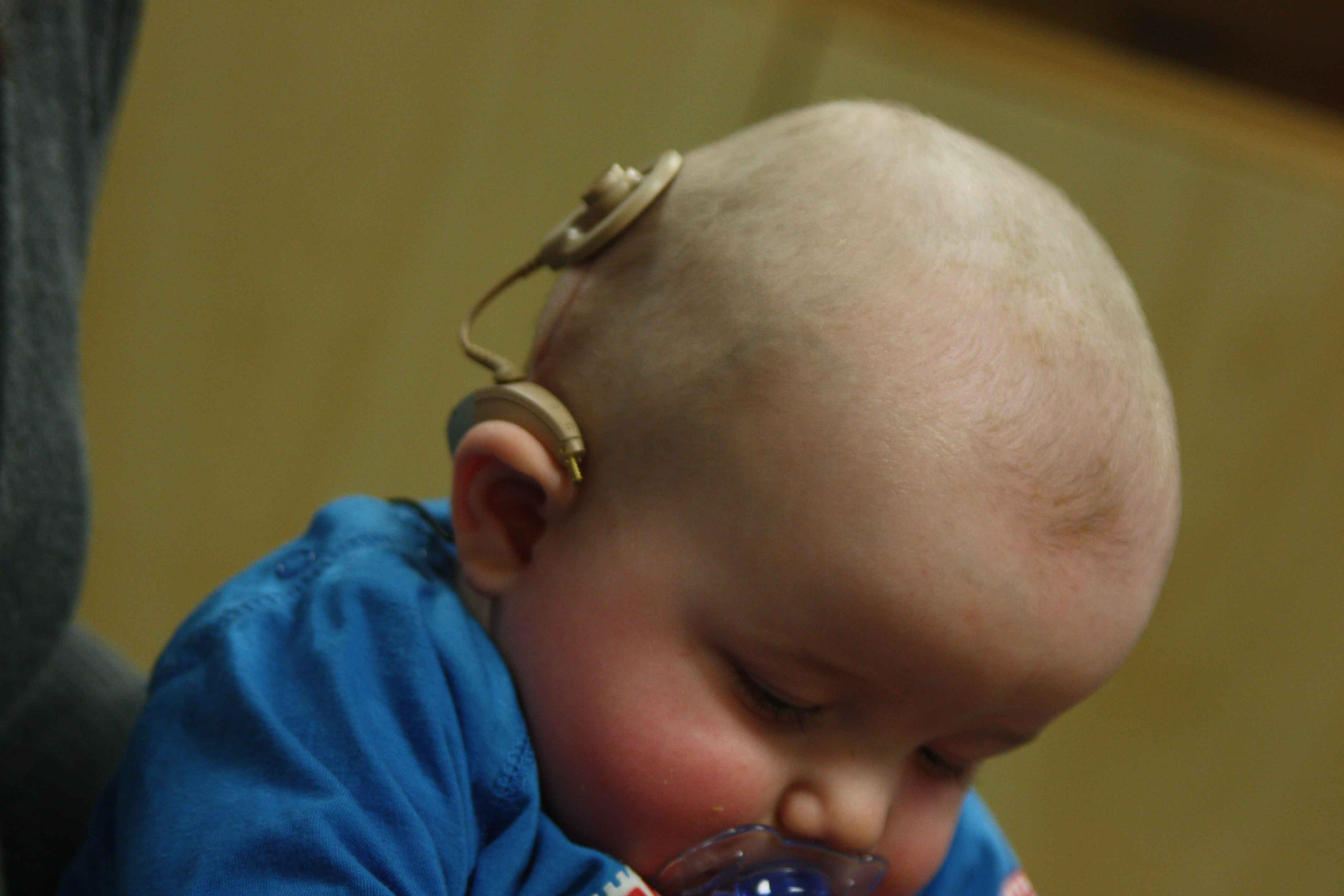
Cochlear implants can be chosen at any age, including in babies.

Cochlear implants are an option for children and adults with severe or profound hearing loss. Cochlear implants are surgically placed devices that stimulate the cochlear nerve to help the person hear. A cochlear implant is used instead of hearing aids to help when someone has difficulties understanding speech. For children, the younger they are at the time of implantation, the better their auditory skill and perception. Babies with confirmed bilateral profound sensorineural hearing loss may begin the surgical evaluation process for implantation as early as six months, with the US officially allowing the surgery to take place as early as nine months of age. Children with other medical problems or other types of hearing loss may be considered at a slightly older age. Parents sometimes have difficulty deciding to get cochlear implants for their child. Many felt a sense of urgency, and, in the end, most parents felt it was beneficial for their child.

== Cultural context ==
The flag of the deaf community made by Arnaud Balard

In a cultural context, Deaf culture refers to a tight-knit cultural group of people whose primary language is signed, and who practice social and cultural norms which are distinct from those of the surrounding hearing community. This community does not automatically include all those who are clinically or legally deaf, nor does it exclude every hearing person. According to Baker and Padden, it includes any person who "identifies him/herself as a member of the Deaf community, and other members accept that person as a part of the community", an example being children of Deaf adults with average hearing ability.

It includes the set of social beliefs, behaviors, art, literary traditions, history, values, and shared institutions of communities influenced by Deafness and use sign languages as the main means of communication.

While deafness is often included within the umbrella of disability, members of the Deaf community tend to view Deafness as a difference in human experience or as a language minority.

== History ==
The first known record of sign language in history comes from Plato's Cratylus, written in the fifth century BCE. In a dialogue on the "correctness of names", Socrates says, "Suppose that we had no voice or tongue, and wanted to communicate with one another, should we not, like the deaf and dumb, make signs with the hands and head and the rest of the body?" His belief that deaf people possessed an innate intelligence for language put him at odds with his student Aristotle, who said, "Those who are born deaf all become senseless and incapable of reason", and that "it is impossible to reason without the ability to hear".

This pronouncement would reverberate through the ages and it was not until the 17th century when manual alphabets began to emerge, as did various treatises on deaf education, such as Reducción de las letras y arte para enseñar a hablar a los mudos ('Reduction of letters and art for teaching mute people to speak'), written by Juan Pablo Bonet in Madrid in 1620, and Didascalocophus, or, The deaf and dumb mans tutor, written by George Dalgarno in 1680.

In 1760, French philanthropic educator Charles-Michel de l'Épée opened the world's first free school for the deaf. The school won approval for government funding in 1791 and became known as the "Institution Nationale des Sourds-Muets à Paris". The school inspired the opening of what is today known as the American School for the Deaf, the oldest permanent school for the deaf in the United States, and indirectly, Gallaudet University, the world's first school for the advanced education of the deaf and hard of hearing, and to date, the only higher education institution in which all programs and services are specifically designed to accommodate deaf and hard of hearing students.

== Schooling ==
Parents of d/Deaf and hard-of-hearing children often encounter difficulties when choosing an educational setting for their child. They may consider the child's needs and abilities, how the school can accommodate the child, and the school environment itself. Both the child and the parent may benefit from trial and error with different schools, to identify the best available environment.

There are two major paths available to d/Deaf students. One option is to attend a public, non-specialized school, the same as they would if they were hearing. This is often called "mainstreaming". If the student is mainstreamed, they may use various accommodations, such as using an interpreter in class, wearing hearing aids or cochlear implants, or having someone write notes in class for them.

The second option is to attend a specialized Deaf school. In America, most states have at least one. These are often boarding schools, and students will come from all over the state to attend. Deaf schools typically use one or more sign languages both in and out of class, to promote communication and understanding of the school curriculum. They often have a significant impact on a sign language's development, as Deaf schools are one of the only places where most people are Deaf and sign.

As children, d/Deaf people learn literacy differently from hearing children. They may have difficulties speaking and associating sounds with specific letters, causing them difficulty to learn reading, whereas hearing children naturally learn to speak and eventually learn to write.

The Quota International organization, headquartered in the United States, provided considerable educational support in the Philippines, where it began offering free education to d/Deaf children in the Leganes Resource Center for the Deaf. The Nippon Foundation supports d/Deaf students at Gallaudet University and the National Technical Institute for the Deaf through international scholarship programs to encourage them to become future leaders in the Deaf community.

== See also ==
- Auditory neuropathy
- Auditory verbal agnosia
- Auditory-verbal therapy
- Causes of hearing loss
- Cortical deafness
- Cued speech
- Deaf hearing
- Deaf history
- Deaf plus
- Deaf rights movement
- Deaf theatre
- Deafblindness
- Deafness by country
- Deaf-community sign language
- Deaf-mute
- Diagnosis of hearing loss
- List of films featuring the deaf and hard of hearing
- Models of deafness
- World Hearing Day
