= Deaf hearing =

Ability to react to a sound without hearing it

Deaf hearing refers to a condition in which deaf individuals are able to react to an auditory stimulus, without actually being able to hear it.

When patients are completely deaf in both ears they begin to rely more strongly on their other senses. Because hearing relies on external sound waves, a deaf patient will feel the vibrations, rather than relying on what would normally be perceived as sound. As a patient relies on "feeling" sounds rather than hearing them, they subconsciously hear with their sense of touch, therefore reacting to auditory stimuli without actually hearing sound.

Deaf patients also adapt to their disability by relying more on sight. While a patient with normal hearing relies on sound to perceive different things than they would by sight, the deaf use their sense of sight to observe things that would usually be perceived through hearing. For example, if a person were to walk into a room from an angle that could not be seen, a person with normal hearing would most likely detect them from hearing the door open. A deaf person might rely on changes in lighting patterns or the sympathetic movement of other objects in the room.

Similar compensations have long been noted among the blind.

== See also ==
- Blindsight
