= National Center on Disability and Journalism =

American organization

The National Center on Disability and Journalism (NCDJ) provides resources and support to journalists and communications professionals covering disability issues. The center is headquartered at the Walter Cronkite School of Journalism and Mass Communication at Arizona State University.

== History ==
The center was founded in 1998 as the Disability Media Project to raise awareness of how people with disabilities are undercovered in the news. Freelance photographer Suzanne Levine established the Disability Media Project in San Francisco to serve as a bridge between the media and disability communities. An advisory board of journalists, educators and disability activists helped develop resources for working journalists and for schools of journalism and mass communication to integrate coverage of people with disabilities into their curricula. In 2000, the organization's name was changed to the National Center on Disability and Journalism to reflect its journalistic mission. The center was housed in the humanities building at San Francisco State University and for a short time in an office on Market Street in San Francisco. After moving to Boston in 2004, the NCDJ pursued an affiliation with a university journalism program.

In 2008, the center was moved to the Walter Cronkite School of Journalism and Mass Communication at Arizona State University in downtown Phoenix.

== Focus ==
The focus of the NCDJ is to provide support, resources and guidance to reporters who cover disabilities as a beat as well as those who occasionally report on people with disabilities. Although one in four people in the U.S. live with some form of disability, according to the Centers for Disease Control and Prevention, they are underrepresented in the mainstream media, and coverage that does exist is too often inaccurate or incomplete. On the center's website, there is a newsfeed of the latest stories covering disability issues as well as various resources, including an oft-cited disability style guide explaining appropriate language and terms when describing disabilities and an interview tip sheet with best practices for reporters.

The NCDJ does not advocate a particular point of view; rather it focuses on the journalistic principles of accuracy, fairness and diversity in news coverage.

== Advisory board ==
The NCDJ Advisory Board is made up of professional journalists and educators who help chart the course of the center and provide support and advice. Many of them also conduct training and give talks on disability issues.

- Andrew Becker: Becker is news director for KUER, the NPR-affiliated public radio station in Utah. He received his master's degree in journalism from UC Berkeley. Becker lives in Salt Lake City with his wife and children, the oldest of whom has cerebral palsy.
- Steve Doig: Before joining Arizona State University as the Knight Chair in Journalism, Doig worked for 20 years as an investigative reporter and editor at the Miami Herald.
- Beth Haller: Haller is a professor of journalism/new media at Towson University in Maryland. Her research is focused on how people with disabilities are reflected in the media. She also blogs at Media dis&dat on disability issues in the news.
- Becky Kekula: Kekula serves as the Disability Equality Index Director at Disability:IN, where she is responsible for managing the diversity, equity and inclusion programs. She also serves as the Little People of America Employment Chair.
- Jennifer LaFleur: LaFleur is data journalist in residence and data editor for the Investigative Reporting Workshop at American University. Previously, she was a senior editor at Reveal from the Center for Investigative Reporting and director of computer-assisted reporting at ProPublica.
- Susan LoTempio: LoTempio worked for the Buffalo News for 25 years, in various editing roles. She has written and lectured on how the media cover disability issues and why they need to report beyond the stereotypes of disability.
- Wendy Lu: Lu is a senior staff editor at the New York Times and a reporter covering the intersection of disability, politics and culture. She has spoken around the globe on disability representation in the media. In December 2021, she was recognized as one of the Forbes "30 Under 30" in part for her work "on the disabilities beat."
- Cara Reedy: Reedy is program manager for Disability Rights Education and Defense Fund's (DREDF) Disability Media Alliance Project. A former CNN producer and writer, she is a journalist, actor, and photographer.
- Amy Silverman: Silverman is an independent journalist based in Tempe, Arizona. Her focus is social justice with the goal of better covering people with intellectual disabilities by merging personal narrative and storytelling with investigative and explanatory reporting, as well as focusing on the development of plain language translations and other ways of making journalism more accessible.

== Awards ==
The Katherine Schneider Journalism Award for Excellence in Reporting on Disability was created in 2012 as the first national journalism award devoted exclusively to disability coverage. It is administered by the National Center on Disability and Journalism through a grant from Schneider, a retired clinical psychologist who also supports the Schneider Family Book Award. Entries from print, broadcast and online outlets are accepted and judged based on how they go beyond the ordinary in covering the experiences of people with disabilities and how well they highlight strategies for overcoming challenges. Cash prizes are awarded each year.

== New York Times partnership ==
In 2021, the NCDJ and the New York Times announced a partnership to establish a fellowship at the Times for early career journalists covering disability issues. The NCDJ provides mentorship for the fellow and training for the newsroom.

== See also ==
- Disability in the media
