= Beth Haller =

American communications scholar

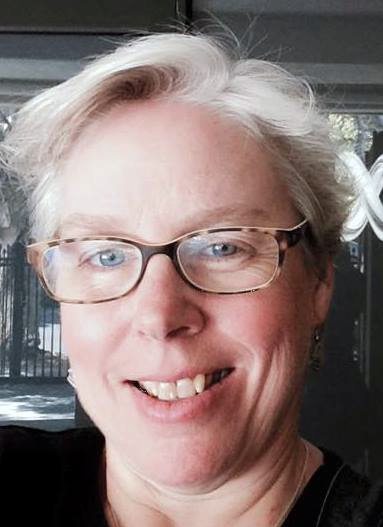
- Beth Haller at a radio station in Australia, where she was a Fulbright Scholar in 2015
- Born: 1961 (age 63–64); Fort Worth, Texas
- Occupations: Journalist, editor, college professor
- Honours: Fulbright Scholar (2015)

Beth A. Haller (born 1961) is a professor of mass communication and communication studies at Towson University, specializing in the handling of disability in news and new media. She serves on the advisory board of the National Center on Disability and Journalism, and traveled in Australia as a Fulbright Scholar in 2015.

== Early life and education ==
Beth A. Haller was born in Fort Worth, Texas. She attended Baylor University as an undergraduate, as a journalism major, and graduated in 1983. She earned a master's degree in journalism at the University of Maryland College Park, and completed doctoral studies in mass media at Temple University in 1995, with a dissertation titled "Disability rights on the public agenda: Elite news media coverage of the Americans with Disabilities Act."

== Career ==
Haller joined the faculty at Towson University in 1996. She became a full professor in 2008, and retired in 2020. She serves on the advisory board of the National Center on Disability and Journalism, and is a co-founder and director of GADIM, the Global Alliance for Disability in Media and Entertainment.

Books by Haller include Representing Disability in an Ableist World (2010) and Byline of Hope: The Newspaper and Magazine Writing of Helen Keller (2015). Haller was co-editor of Disability Studies Quarterly from 2003 to 2006. In 2012, Haller was admitted into the Fulbright Specialists Program, and traveled in Australia as a Fulbright scholar in early 2015. While in Australia she spoke on such topics as disability in reality television, film portrayals of disabled people, and disability in science fiction.

Beyond academic publications, Haller is frequently interviewed on disability topics by fellow journalists.
