= Nelly Thomas =

Australian comedian

- Born: Merredin, Western Australia, Australia
- Children: 2

Comedy career
- Years active: 2002–present
- Medium: Stand-up comedian, author, educator, broadcaster
- Website: www.nellythomas.com

Nelly Thomas is a comedian, educator, author, and broadcaster from Western Australia based in Melbourne.

== Comedy ==
Thomas won the Triple J Raw Comedy competition in 2003 alongside Stephen Sheehan. Since then she has performed around the world as a stand-up comedian. She is also an author.

Thomas has performed twice at the Edinburgh Fringe, several times at the Melbourne Fringe, and is a regular feature at the Melbourne International Comedy Festival (MICF).

Solo Shows:

- Family Ties, 2006 (Golden Gibbo nominee)
- Nelly Thomas is not a Yummy Mummy, 2008
- I Coulda Been A Sailor, with guest appearance by Kate McLennan
- Nelly Thomas is Pleasantly Furious, 2014

Group Shows:

- Comedy Zone, 2004, with Stephen Sheehan, Sammy J, Marcus Ryan and hosted by Cal Wilson
- Betty Blues: A Comedy Show about Depression, 2004, By Nelly Thomas and featuring Toby Sullivan, Jill Peakock, Sam Simmons & Natalie Michelle Smith
- Raw Prawns, 2004, Nelly Thomas with Steve Sheehan, Josh Makinda and Marcus Ryan
- Mother of the Year, 2009, with Catherine Deveny and Christine Basil
- A Black Sheep Walked into a Baaaa, 2009, written by the performers and writers from Ilbijerri Aboriginal and Torres Strait Islander Theatre Company with Nelly Thomas, Directed by Rachel Maza-Long
- Glorious Baaaastards, 2010, written by the performers and writers from Ilbijerri Aboriginal and Torres Strait Islander Theatre Company with Nelly Thomas, Directed by Rachel Maza-Long

Director:

- Plan B, 2005, written and performed by Maria Bamford and directed by Nelly Thomas
- Everything Must Go, 2011, Rachel Leary, Directed by Damian Callinan, assistant director, Nelly Thomas
- Who’s That Chic?, 2012, Candy B & Busty Beats, directed by Nelly Thomas
- Tales from the Crip, 2014, written and performed by Stella Young, directed by Nelly Thomas; winner Best Newcomer Melbourne International Comedy Festival

Thomas programmed and ran a regular Character Comedy room at various venues including Trades Hall, Melbourne HiFi Club and at various festivals. It was the first dedicated character comedy room in Australia and featured performers such as Kate McLennan, Wes Snelling, Lawrence Mooney, Andrea Powell, Maria Bamford, Ross Daniels, Casey Bennetto, Damian Callinan, Lisa Maza, Linda Haggar, Fahey Younger, and Adam Richard.

In 2009, Thomas appeared on the Australian television comedy history quiz show ADbc and 2015's Judith Lucy Is All Woman. She appears as a regular guest commentator on ABC TV's News Breakfast. Thomas works regularly on ABC Melbourne Radio and has hosted the Evening Show from time to time. She is also a regular guest on Raf Epstein's Afternoon show where she provides commentary on news and events of the week. Thomas often appears on the Radio National Friday afternoon quiz with Patricia Karvelas.

Thomas has featured on a number of podcasts - most notably several appearances on Wil Anderson's Wilosophy. In 2020, Thomas started her own podcast – Person, Place and Thing - and guests have included Rosie Battie, Jason Tamiru, Maria Bamford, Eddie Perfect and more.

Thomas has directed a number of comedians including Maria Bamford and Candy Bowers as well as some of her own shows. She collaborated with comedian and disability activist Stella Young on the show Tales from the Crip, which won Best Newcomer at the 2014 Melbourne International Comedy Festival. Young passed away the same year and Thomas delivered a eulogy for her at the Melbourne Town Hall.

== Writing ==
Thomas is the author of five books:

- What Women Want Random House, 2012. ISBN 9781742754895.
- Some Girls Illustrated by Sarah Dunk. 2017. ISBN 9780648147404.
- Some Boys Illustrated by Sarah Dunk. 2018. ISBN 9781760640897.
- Some Brains : a book celebrating neurodiversity Illustrated by Cat MacInnes. 2019. ISBN 9781760641955.
- Some Mums are Fat Molls, illustrated by Cat MacInnes; a picture book for adults

She writes regularly for the Australian print and online media, including The Guardian and The Sydney Morning Herald and a column for New Matilda.

== Broadcasting ==
She is a regular guest and presenter on ABC local radio and guest on Radio National.

In 2018 she wrote and presented The C Word, a documentary about class in Australia for Radio National's Earshot.

In 2010, Thomas co-hosted the Boxcutters podcast. In 2020 she launched Person, Place & Thing: a little podcast for Big Times.

== Educator ==
Before winning Raw Comedy, Thomas worked in the welfare sector and has continued to advocate for issues including homelessness, asylum seeker rights, gender and women's rights.

In 2011, she launched a DVD called The Talk to encourage young people and their parents and carers to talk openly about smart sex choices. In 2003 Thomas created the No Means No Show, a live show aimed at teaching adolescents about making smart choices regarding sex.

From 2016 to 2019 Thomas was an Ambassador for Jean Hailes for Women's Health.
