= Deaf rights movement =

Disability rights and cultural diversity movement

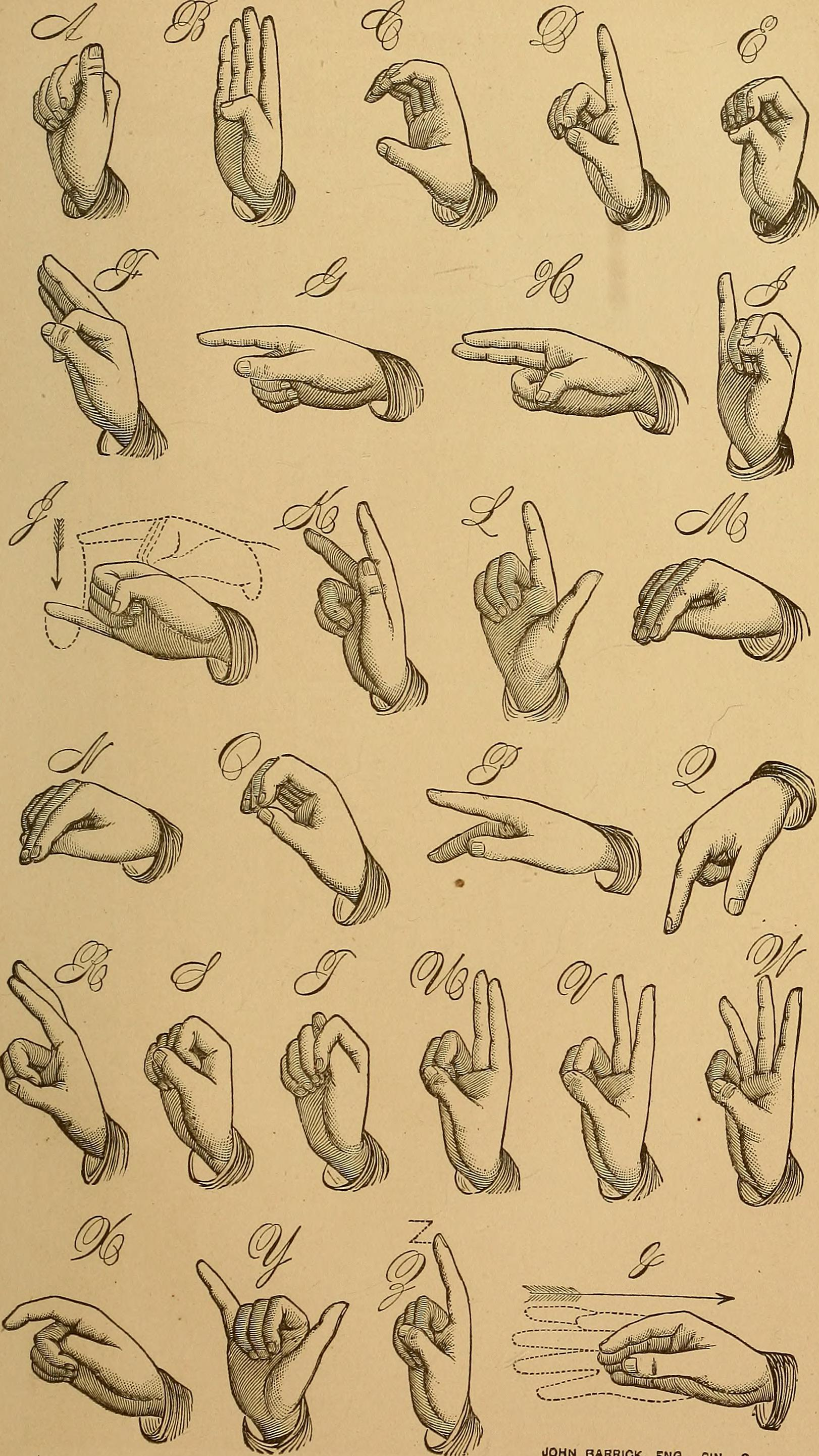
Sign languages are an important part of Deaf culture. The American Sign Language (ASL) alphabet is shown here.

The Deaf rights movement encompasses a series of social movements within the disability rights and cultural diversity movements that encourages deaf and hard of hearing to push society to adopt a position of equal respect for them. Acknowledging that those who were Deaf or hard of hearing had rights to obtain the same things as those hearing led this movement. Establishing an educational system to teach those with deafness was one of the first accomplishments of this movement. Sign language, as well as cochlear implants, has also had an extensive impact on the Deaf community. These have all been aspects that have paved the way for those with deafness, which began with the Deaf rights movement.

== Deaf education ==
=== Oralism ===
Oralism focuses on teaching deaf students through oral communicative means rather than sign language.

There is strong opposition within Deaf communities to the oralist method of teaching deaf children to speak and lip read with limited or no use of sign language in the classroom. The method is intended to make it easier for deaf children to integrate into hearing communities, but the benefits of learning in such an environment are disputed. The use of sign language is also central to Deaf identity and attempts to limit its use are viewed as an attack.

=== Deaf schools ===
Parents of deaf children also have the opportunity to send their children to deaf schools, where the curriculum is taught in American Sign Language. The first school for the education of deaf individuals was the Connecticut Asylum for the Education and Instruction of Deaf and Dumb Persons, which opened on April 15, 1817. This was a coeducation institution. This school was later renamed the American School for the Deaf, and was granted federal money to set up of deaf institutions around the country. Many teachers in these schools were women, because according to PBS and the research done for the film Through Deaf Eyes, they were better at instructing due to the patience it took to do something repetitively. The American School for the Deaf was set up based on a British model of education for deaf individuals with instruction in the subjects of reading, writing, history, math, and an advanced study of the Bible.

Gallaudet University is the only deaf university in the world, which instructs in American Sign Language, and promotes research and publications for the deaf community. Gallaudet University is responsible for expanding services and education for deaf individuals in developing countries around the world, as well as in the United States. Many deaf individuals choose to be educated in a deaf environment for their college level education.

=== Deaf President Now ===
At Gallaudet University Deaf President Now students, with the support of many alumni, faculty, staff and friends, protested the Board of Trustees' continued appointments of hearing presidents over highly qualified deaf candidates in an institution established to serve the deaf. I. King Jordan made history in 1988, becoming the first deaf president.

=== Historical figures ===
There have been many individuals who have made advancements in the deaf community. These individuals have been both deaf or hearing. A few of the most recognizable names include: Alexander Graham Bell, who is known for the invention of the telephone but to the Deaf, is seen as a villain of sorts; Heather Whitestone, the first deaf Miss-America; Marlee Matlin, a well-known deaf actress; Laurent Clerc, a well-known deaf professor; and Helen Keller, the most commonly known deaf-blind woman.

However, this is only a small number of individuals who have made advancements in the deaf community.

== Public accommodations ==
The Americans with Disabilities Act, also known as the ADA, has made a huge impact on the deaf community. In 1990 it was a landmark for people with disabilities. The ADA has been a great benefit for hard of hearing and deaf people to help them gain every aspect of life that a hearing person has. The ADA took the important principles in these laws and extended them to the broad mainstream of Americans public life. It prohibits discrimination in almost every aspect of society, meaning one needs a legitimate reason to not hire someone with a disability. The legislation provides legal protection in employment (Title I), access to state and local government and public transportation (Title II), public accommodations (Title III) (they have to provide a translator), and telecommunications (Title IV). (26) George H W Bush signed this into act, and there was no acclaimed retaliation from this. It did not solve the problem of discrimination but it gave those who had a disability protection.

In 1975 Congress found that more than eight million children were not receiving equal education. There was another bill passed to help solve this problem called the Individuals with Disabilities Education Act (IDEA). The IDEA was made to "ensure that all children with disabilities have access to a free, appropriate, public education that emphasizes special education and related services designed to meet their needs and prepare them for employment and independent living. To ensure that the rights of children with disabilities and their parents are protected. To assist states, localities, educational service agencies, and federal agencies to pay for education for all children with disabilities. And finally to assess and ensure the effectiveness of efforts to educate children with disabilities." (73)

== Deaf culture movement ==
Deaf culture is a culture defined by usage of sign language and many cultural and social norms.

=== Cochlear implants ===
Within the Deaf community, there is strong opposition to the use of cochlear implants and sometimes also hearing aids and similar technologies. This is often justified in terms of a rejection of the view that deafness, as a condition, is something that needs to be fixed.

Others argue that this technology also threatens the continued existence of Deaf culture, but Kathryn Woodcock argues that it is a greater threat to Deaf culture to reject prospective members just because they used to hear, because their parents chose an implant for them, because they find environmental sound useful, etc. Cochlear implants may improve the perception of sound for suitable implantees, but they do not reverse deafness, or create a normal perception of sounds. The Deaf community still insists that a child not be fitted with a cochlear implant until old enough to decide for themselves because the effects are irreversible and could cause a lifetime of pain, regret, and hatred/isolation.

== See also ==
- Deaf culture
- Sign language
- Deaf education
- Models of deafness
- Audism
- Deaf President Now
- Disability rights movement
- Deafhood
