= Social model of disability =

Societal failure to adapt to disabilities

A short Welsh government advisory animation on the social model of disability

The social model of disability proposes that people are disabled by systemic barriers, negative attitudes, and social exclusion, rather than by their own physical or mental differences. Emerging from the disability rights movement of the 1960s and 1970s, this approach challenges the traditional medical model, which views the body as a machine to be "fixed" to fit a perceived norm. The social model of disability seeks to challenge power imbalances within society between disabled people and seeks to redefine what disability means as a diverse expression of human life.

The social model of disability is based on a distinction between the terms impairment and disability. In this model, the word impairment is used to refer to the actual attributes (or lack of attributes) that affect a person, such as the inability to walk or breathe independently. It seeks to redefine disability to refer to the restrictions caused by society when it does not give equitable social and structural support according to disabled peoples' structural needs. As a simple example, if a person is unable to climb stairs, the medical model focuses on making the individual physically able to climb stairs. The social model tries to make stair-climbing unnecessary, such as by making society adapt to their needs, and assist them by replacing the stairs with a wheelchair-accessible ramp. According to the social model, the person remains disabled with respect to climbing stairs, but the disability is negligible and no longer disabling in that scenario, because the person can get to the same locations without climbing any stairs.

It celebrates a non-conformist approach to the concept of disability and confronts deficit thinking of disability, which is argued to sit alongside the lines of activism and identity of pride for individuals with disabilities.

== History ==
=== Disability rights movement ===
There is a hint from before the 1970s that the interaction between disability and society was beginning to be considered. British politician and disability rights campaigner Alf Morris wrote in 1969 (emphasis added):

When the title of my Bill was announced, I was frequently asked what kind of improvements for the chronically sick and disabled I had in mind. It always seemed best to begin with the problems of access. I explained that I wanted to remove the severe and gratuitous social handicaps inflicted on disabled people, and often on their families and friends, not just by their exclusion from town and county halls, art galleries, libraries and many of the universities, but even from pubs, restaurants, theatres, cinemas and other places of entertainment ... I explained that I and my friends were concerned to stop society from treating disabled people as if they were a separate species.

The history of the social model of disability begins with the history of the disability rights movement. Around 1970, various groups in North America, including sociologists, disabled people, and disability-focused political groups, began to pull away from the accepted medical lens of viewing disability. Instead, they began to discuss things like oppression, civil rights, and accessibility. This change in discourse resulted in conceptualizations of disability that was rooted in social constructs.

In 1975, the UK organization Union of the Physically Impaired Against Segregation (UPIAS) claimed: "In our view it is society which disables physically impaired people. Disability is something imposed on top of our impairments by the way we are unnecessarily isolated and excluded from full participation in society." This became known as the social interpretation, or social definition, of disability.

=== Mike Oliver ===
Following the UPIAS "social definition of disability", in 1983 the disabled academic Mike Oliver coined the phrase social model of disability in reference to these ideological developments. Oliver focused on the idea of an individual model (of which the medical was a part) versus a social model, derived from the distinction originally made between impairment and disability by the UPIAS. Oliver's seminal 1990 book The Politics of Disablement is widely cited as a major moment in the adoption of this model. The book included just three pages about the social model of disability.

=== Developments ===
The "social model" was extended and developed by academics and activists in Australia, the UK, the US, and other countries to include all disabled people, including those who have learning disabilities, intellectual disabilities, or emotional, mental health or behavioural problems.

== Tool for cultural analysis ==
The social model has become a key tool in the analysis of the cultural representation of disability; from literature, to radio, to charity-imagery to cinema. The social model has become the key conceptual analysis in challenging, for examples, stereotypes and archetypes of disabled people by revealing how conventional imagery reinforces the oppression of disabled people. Key theorists include Paul Darke (cinema), Lois Keith (literature), Leonard Davis (Deaf culture), Jenny Sealey (theatre) and Mary-Pat O'Malley (radio).

== Components and usage ==
A fundamental aspect of the social model concerns equality. The struggle for equality is often compared to the struggles of other socially marginalized groups. Equal rights are said to empower people with the "ability" to make decisions and the opportunity to live life to the fullest. A related phrase often used by disability rights activists, as with other social activism, is "Nothing About Us Without Us".

The social model of disability focuses on changes required in society. These might be in terms of:

- Attitudes, for example a more positive attitude towards certain mental traits or behaviors, or not underestimating the potential quality of life of disabled people,
- Social support, for example help dealing with barriers; resources, aids, or positive discrimination to provide equal access, for example providing someone to explain work culture for an autistic employee,
- Information, for example using suitable formats (e.g. braille), levels (e.g. simplicity of language) or coverage (e.g. explaining issues others may take for granted),
- Physical structures, for example buildings with sloped access and elevators, or
- Flexible work hours for people with circadian rhythm sleep disorders.

=== Limitations and criticisms ===
Oliver did not intend the social model of disability to be an all-encompassing theory of disability, but rather a starting point in reframing how society views disability. This model was conceived of as a tool that could be used to improve the lives of disabled people, rather than a complete explanation for every experience and circumstance. An unintended consequence Oliver foresaw of the adoption of the social model of disability in politics was the undermining of the efforts of disabled people seeking social justice. Similarly, Tom Shakespeare has argued that the strong social model fails to correspond to the everyday experience of disabled people, many of whom experience physical and mental difficulties, as well as social barriers and exclusion.

A primary criticism of the social model is its centring of the experiences of individuals with physical impairments, which has resulted in overlooking other forms of disability, such as mental health conditions.

A secondary criticism relates to how the social model underplays impairments' impacts. That is, the focus on how the social environment can cause disablement may ignore the fact that impairments "can be restrictive, painful and unpleasant".

Conversely, some argue against the language of impairment, indicating that some disabilities are purely social and that no impairment exists, such as within the Deaf community. This relates to a critique regarding the belief of a species norm, wherein there is a "normal" human body, and all variations to the norm may be considered "impairments". Some activists and academic argue that this reliance on a species norm still implies that impairments are deficits, meaning this model is still strongly connected to deficit models of disability. That is, to be considered disabled, an individual must state they have an impairment, which implies, to some degree, that they are damaged. To an extent can have impacts on how government can distribute benefits on ground of impairments that may be more significant and those that are not. Thus, some needs are not met on the basis of not having an impairment significant enough to receive aid, which can be a negative application of the social model within government policy. Newer paradigms, such as Mad studies and neurodiversity studies, recognize a broad spectrum of human experience without a focus on a species norm and thus, deviances from that norm that may be considered impairments or deficits.

The social model has also been criticized for not promoting the normal differences between disabled people, who can be any age, gender, race, and sexual orientation, and instead presenting them as a monolithic, insufficiently individuated group of people.

Despite these criticisms, academics whose work involves disability indicate that the social model is still beneficial in helping people begin to rethink disability beyond deficit. As Finkelstein states: "A good model can enable us to see something which we do not understand because in the model it can be seen from different viewpoints [...] that can trigger insights that we might not otherwise develop."

== As an identity ==
In the late 20th century and early 21st century, the social model of disability became a dominant feature of identities for disabled people in the UK. Under the social model of disability, a disability identity is created by "the presence of impairment, the experience of disablism and self- identification as a disabled person."

The social model of disability implies that attempts to change, "fix", or "cure" individuals, especially when used against the wishes of the individual, can be discriminatory and prejudiced. This attitude, which may be seen as stemming from a medical model and a subjective value system, can harm the self-esteem and social inclusion of those constantly subjected to it (e.g. being told they are not as good or valuable, in an overall and core sense, as others). Some communities have actively resisted "treatments", while, for example, defending a unique culture or set of abilities. In the Deaf community, sign language is valued even if most people do not know it, and some parents argue against cochlear implants for deaf infants who cannot consent to them. Autistic people may say that their "unusual" behavior, which they say can serve an important purpose to them, should not have to be suppressed to please others. They argue instead for acceptance of neurodiversity and accommodation to different needs and goals. Some people diagnosed with a mental disorder argue that they are just different and do not necessarily conform. The biopsychosocial model of disease/disability is an attempt by practitioners to address this.

The label "neurodiversity" has been used by various mental-disability rights advocates within the context of the social model of disability. The label, originally associated with autism, has been applied to other neurodevelopmental conditions or neurodivergences, such as attention deficit hyperactivity disorder, developmental speech disorders, dyslexia, dysgraphia, dyspraxia, dyscalculia, dysnomia, intellectual disability, and Tourette syndrome, as well as schizophrenia, bipolar disorder, and some mental health conditions such as schizoaffective disorder, antisocial personality disorder, dissociative disorders, and obsessive–compulsive disorder. The social model itself implies that neurodivergent people are living behind barriers that inhibit participation in everyday life. Language associated with warfare such as "battling" or "combatting" is thus replaced with language that de-pathologizes neurodivergence. Advocates for a social model of disability argue instead that neurodivergence should be looked at through the lens of societal or relational models of disability.

The social model implies that practices such as eugenics are founded on social values and a prejudiced understanding of the potential and value of those labeled disabled. "Over 200,000 disabled people were some of the earlier victims of the Holocaust, after Communists, other political enemies, and homosexuals."

A 1986 article stated:

It is important that we do not allow ourselves to be dismissed as if we all come under this one great metaphysical category 'the disabled'. The effect of this is a depersonalization, a sweeping dismissal of our individuality, and a denial of our right to be seen as people with our own uniqueness, rather than as the anonymous constituents of a category or group. These words that lump us all together – 'the disabled', 'spina bifida', 'tetraplegic', 'muscular dystrophy', – are nothing more than terminological rubbish bins into which all the important things about us as people get thrown away.

== Economic aspects ==
The social model also relates to economic empowerment, proposing that people can be disabled by a lack of resources to meet their needs. For example, a disabled person may need support services to be able to participate fully in society, and can become disabled if society cuts access to those support services, perhaps in the name of government austerity measures.

The social model addresses other issues, such as the underestimation of the potential of disabled people to contribute to society and add economic value to society if they are given equal rights and equally suitable facilities and opportunities as others. Economic research on companies that attempt to accommodate disability in their workforce suggest they outperform competitors.

In Autumn 2001, the UK Office for National Statistics identified that approximately one-fifth of the working-age population was disabled, equating to an estimated 7.1 million disabled people, compared to an estimated 29.8 million nondisabled people. This analysis also provided insight into some of the reasons why disabled people were not in the labor market, such as that the reduction in disability benefits in entering the labor market would not make it worthwhile to enter into employment. A three-pronged approach was suggested: "incentives to work via the tax and benefit system, for example through the Disabled Person's Tax Credit; helping people back into work, for example via the New Deal for Disabled People; and tackling discrimination in the workplace via anti-discrimination policy. Underpinning this are the Disability Discrimination Act (DDA) 1995 and the Disability Rights Commission."

Canada and the United States have operated under the premise that social assistance benefits should not exceed the amount of money earned through labour in order to give citizens an incentive to search for and maintain employment. This has led to widespread poverty amongst disabled citizens. In the 1950s, disability pensions were established and included various forms of direct economic assistance; however, compensation was low. Since the 1970s, both governments have viewed unemployed, disabled citizens as excess labor due to continuous high unemployment rates and have made minimal attempts to increase employment, keeping disabled people at poverty-level incomes due to the 'incentive' principle. Poverty is the most debilitating circumstance disabled people face, resulting in the inability to afford proper medical, technological and other assistance necessary to participate in society.

== Law and public policy ==
In the United Kingdom, the Disability Discrimination Act 1995 defines disability using the medical model – disabled people are defined as people with certain conditions or limitations on their ability to carry out "normal day-to-day activities." But the requirement of employers and service providers to make "reasonable adjustments" to their policies or practices, or physical aspects of their premises, follows the social model. By making adjustments, employers and service providers are removing the barriers that disable, according to the social model. In 2006, amendments to the act called for local authorities and others to actively promote disability equality; this was enforced via the formation of the Disability Equality Duty in December 2006. In 2010, the Disability Discrimination Act 1995 was amalgamated into the Equality Act 2010, along with other pertinent discrimination legislation. The Equality Act 2010 extends the law on discrimination to indirect discrimination. For example, if a carer of a disabled person is discriminated against, this is now also unlawful. Since October 2010, when it came into effect, employers may not legally ask questions about illness or disability at interviews for a job or for a referee to comment on such in a reference, except where there is a need to make reasonable adjustments for an interview to proceed. Following an offer of a job, an employer can lawfully ask such questions.

In the United States, the Americans with Disabilities Act of 1990 (ADA), is a wide-ranging civil rights law that prohibits discrimination based on disability in a wide range of settings. The ADA was the first civil rights law of its kind in the world and affords protections against discrimination to disabled Americans. The law was modeled after the Civil Rights Act of 1964, which made discrimination based on race, religion, sex, national origin, and other characteristics illegal. It requires that mass transportation, commercial buildings, and public accommodations be accessible to disabled people.

In 2007, the European Court of Justice in the Chacón Navas v Eurest Colectividades SA court case, defined disability narrowly according to a medical definition that excluded temporary illness, when considering the Directive establishing a general framework for equal treatment in employment and occupation (Council Directive 2000/78/EC). The directive did not provide for any definition of disability, despite discourse in policy documents previously in the EU about endorsing the social model of disability. This allowed the Court of Justice to take a narrow medical definition.

== Technology ==
Over the last several decades, technology has transformed networks, services, and communication by promoting the rise of telecommunications, computer use, etc. This Digital Revolution has changed how people work, learn, and interact, moving these basic human activities to technological platforms. However, many people who use such technology experience a form of disability. Even if it is not physically visible, those with, for example cognitive impairments, hand tremors, or vision impairments, have some form of disability that prohibit them from fully accessing technology in the way that those without a "technological disability" do.

In Disability and New Media, Katie Ellis and Mike Kent state that "technology is often presented as a source of liberation; however, developments associated with Web 2.0 show that this is not always the case". They go on to state that the technological advancement of Web 2.0 is tethered to social ideology and stigma which "routinely disables people with disability".

In Digital Disability: The Social Construction of Disability in New Media, Gregg Goggin and Christopher Newell call for an innovative understanding of new media and disability issues. They trace developments ranging from telecommunications to assistive technologies to offer a technoscience of disability, which offers a global perspective on how disabled people are represented as users, consumers, viewers, or listeners of new media, by policymakers, corporations, programmers, and disabled people themselves.

== Social construction of disability ==
The social construction of disability comes from a paradigm that suggests that society's beliefs about a particular community, group, or population are grounded in the power structures inherent in that society at any given time. The social expectations surrounding concepts, such as disability, thereby enabling a social construct around what society deems disabled and healthy, often based more on observations or value judgements rather than scientific discovery, which can perpetuate biases.

Ideas surrounding disability stem from societal attitudes, often connected to who is deserving or undeserving, and deemed productive to society at any given time. For example, in the medieval period, a person's moral behavior established disability. Disability was a divine punishment or side effect of a moral failing; being physically or biologically different was not enough to be considered disabled. Only during the Age of Enlightenment did society change its definition of disability to be more related to biology. However, what most Western Europeans considered to be healthy determined the new biological definition of health.

=== 2000 Paralympics ===
While the Olympics were covered live throughout the entire event, the Paralympics were not seen as important enough for the same live coverage before the initial showing. By separating the Olympics and Paralympics, and thus indicating that one is less valuable than the other, disability is socially constructed.

=== Limitations and criticisms ===
Oliver did not intend the social model of disability to be an all-encompassing theory of disability, but rather a starting point in reframing how society views disability. This model was conceived of as a tool that could be used to improve the lives of disabled people, rather than a complete explanation for every experience and circumstance. An unintended consequence Oliver foresaw of the adoption of the social model of disability in politics was the undermining of the efforts of disabled people seeking social justice. Similarly, Tom Shakespeare has argued that the strong social model fails to correspond to the everyday experience of disabled people, many of whom experience physical and mental difficulties, as well as social barriers and exclusion.

A primary criticism of the social model is its centring of the experiences of individuals with physical impairments, which has resulted in overlooking other forms of disability, such as mental health conditions.

A secondary criticism relates to how the social model underplays impairments' impacts. That is, the focus on how the social environment can cause disablement may ignore the fact that impairments "can be restrictive, painful and unpleasant".

Conversely, some argue against the language of impairment, indicating that some disabilities are purely social and that no impairment exists, such as within the Deaf community. This relates to a critique regarding the belief of a species norm, wherein there is a "normal" human body, and all variations to the norm may be considered "impairments". Some activists and academic argue that this reliance on a species norm still implies that impairments are deficits, meaning this model is still strongly connected to deficit models of disability. That is, to be considered disabled, an individual must state they have an impairment, which implies, to some degree, that they are damaged. To an extent can have impacts on how government can distribute benefits on ground of impairments that may be more significant and those that are not. Thus, some needs are not met on the basis of not having an impairment significant enough to receive aid, which can be a negative application of the social model within government policy. Newer paradigms, such as Mad studies and neurodiversity studies, recognize a broad spectrum of human experience without a focus on a species norm and thus, deviances from that norm that may be considered impairments or deficits.

The social model has also been criticized for not promoting the normal differences between disabled people, who can be any age, gender, race, and sexual orientation, and instead presenting them as a monolithic, insufficiently individuatedgroup of people.

Despite these criticisms, academics whose work involves disability indicate that the social model is still beneficial in helping people begin to rethink disability beyond deficit. As Finkelstein states: "A good model can enable us to see something which we do not understand because in the model it can be seen from different viewpoints [...] that can trigger insights that we might not otherwise develop."

== Applications ==
Applying the social model of disability can change goals and care plans. For example, with the medical model of disability, the goal may be to help a child acquire typical abilities and to reduce impairment. With the social model, the goal may be to have a child be included in the normal life of the community, such as attending birthday parties and other social events, regardless of the level of function. In doing so would create a new norm associated with disabled people as well as neurodiverse people as well. Allowing for this kind of diversity to be viewed as both valuable and desirable for society. As well, this could include designed spaces and aides that could assist disabled people through the context of universal design, which could help normalize disability through the creation of inclusive spaces.

=== Education ===
It has been suggested that disability education tries to restore the idea of a moral community, one in which the members question what constitutes a good life, reimagine education, see physical and mental conditions as part of a range of abilities, consider that different talents are distributed in different ways, and understand that all talents should be recognized. In this system, all students would be included in the educational network instead of being set apart as special cases, and it would be acknowledged that all humans have individual needs.

== See also ==
- Ableism
- Assisted living
- Autism-friendly
- Capability approach
- Convention on the Rights of Persons with Disabilities
- Curb cut effect
- Deaf rights movement
- Disability in the media
- Disability justice
- Drapetomania
- Epistemic injustice
- Equality Act
- Hostile architecture
- Inclusion (disability rights)
- Inspiration porn
- Medical industrial complex
- Medicalization
- Models of deafness
- Neurodiversity and labor rights
- Normalization (people with disabilities)
- People-first language
- Public transport accessibility level
- Redundant elevators
- Right to mobility
- Sensory friendly
- Services and supports for people with disabilities
- Sexuality and disability
- Social constructionism
- Survivorship bias
- The Fox and the Stork
- Transport divide
- Universal design
- Web accessibility
