= Cripple =

Person or animal with a physical disability, typically being unable to walk

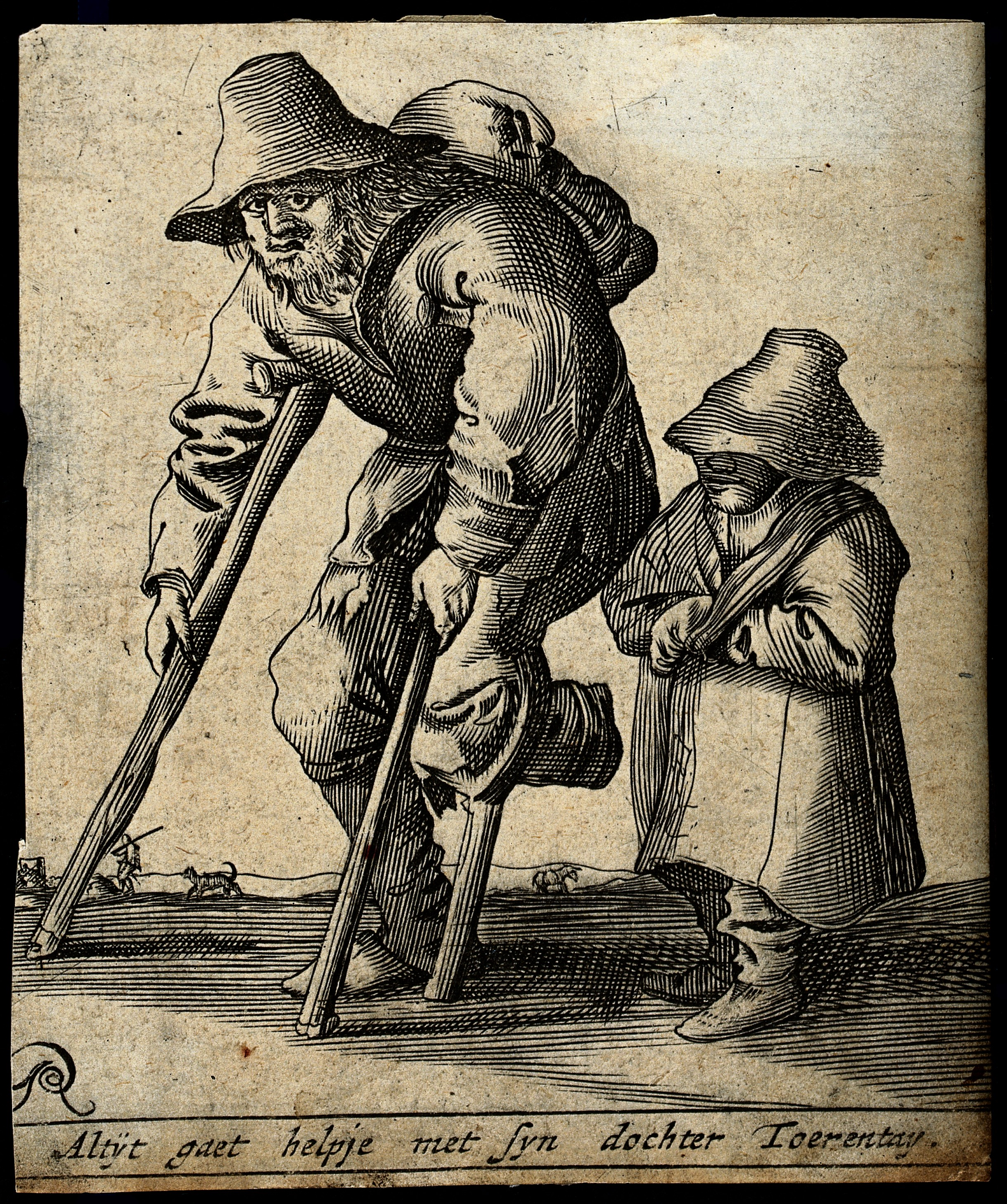
Drawing of a beggar using crutches

A cripple is a person or animal with a physical disability, particularly one who is unable to walk because of an injury or illness. The word was recorded as early as 950 AD, and derives from the Proto-Germanic krupilaz. The German and Dutch words Krüppel and kreupel are cognates.

By the 1970s, the word generally came to be regarded as pejorative when used for people with disabilities. Cripple is also a transitive verb, meaning "cause a disability or inability". The word crippling is also used as an adjective.

== Reappropriation ==
In the same way that the term "queer" has been reappropriated by the gay rights movement, members of the disability rights movement have reclaimed words such as "cripple", "crip", and "gimp" to refer to themselves. The cripple tribunal in Dortmund on 13 December 1981 was one of the main protest actions of the autonomous German disability movement (in confrontation with the established disability assistance) against human rights abuses in nursing homes and psychiatric hospitals, as well as against deficiencies of local public transport. Analogous to the Russell Tribunal by Amnesty International, the cripple tribunal has denounced human rights violations of disabled people.
