= Medical model of disability =

Biomedical view of human disability

The medical model of disability, or medical model, is based in a biomedical perception of disability. This model links a disability diagnosis to an individual's physical body. The model supposes that a disability may reduce the individual's quality of life and aims to correct or diminish the disability with medical intervention. It is often contrasted with the social model of disability.

The medical model focuses on curing or managing illness or disability. By extension, the medical model supposes a compassionate or just society invests resources in health care and related services in an attempt to cure or manage disabilities medically. This is in an aim to expand or improve functioning, and to allow disabled people to lead a more "normal" life. The medical profession's responsibility and potential in this area is seen as central.

Proponents of the medical model note that it provides a standardized framework for diagnosing conditions, measuring population health trends, and developing evidence-based medical interventions.

== History ==
In the 1980s, disability studies introduced the concept of the medical model, asserting that the attitudes in society towards disabled people stemmed from a belief that their physical condition precluded them from full personhood or humanity.

Before the introduction of the biomedical model, patients relaying their narratives to the doctors was paramount. Through these narratives and developing an intimate relationship with the patients, the doctors would develop treatment plans in a time when diagnostic and treatment options were limited. This could particularly be illustrated with aristocratic doctors treating the elite during the 17th and 18th century.

In 1980, the World Health Organization (WHO) introduced a framework for working with disability, publishing the "International Classification of Impairments, Disabilities and Handicaps". The framework proposed to approach disability by using the terms Impairment, Handicap and Disability:

Impairment
A loss or abnormality of physical bodily structure or function, of logic-psychic origin, or physiological or anatomical origin.
Disability
Any limitation or function loss deriving from impairment that prevents the performance of an activity in the time lapse considered normal for a human being.
Handicap
The disadvantaged condition deriving from impairment or disability limiting a person performing a role considered normal in respect of age, sex and social and cultural factors.

=== Components and usage ===
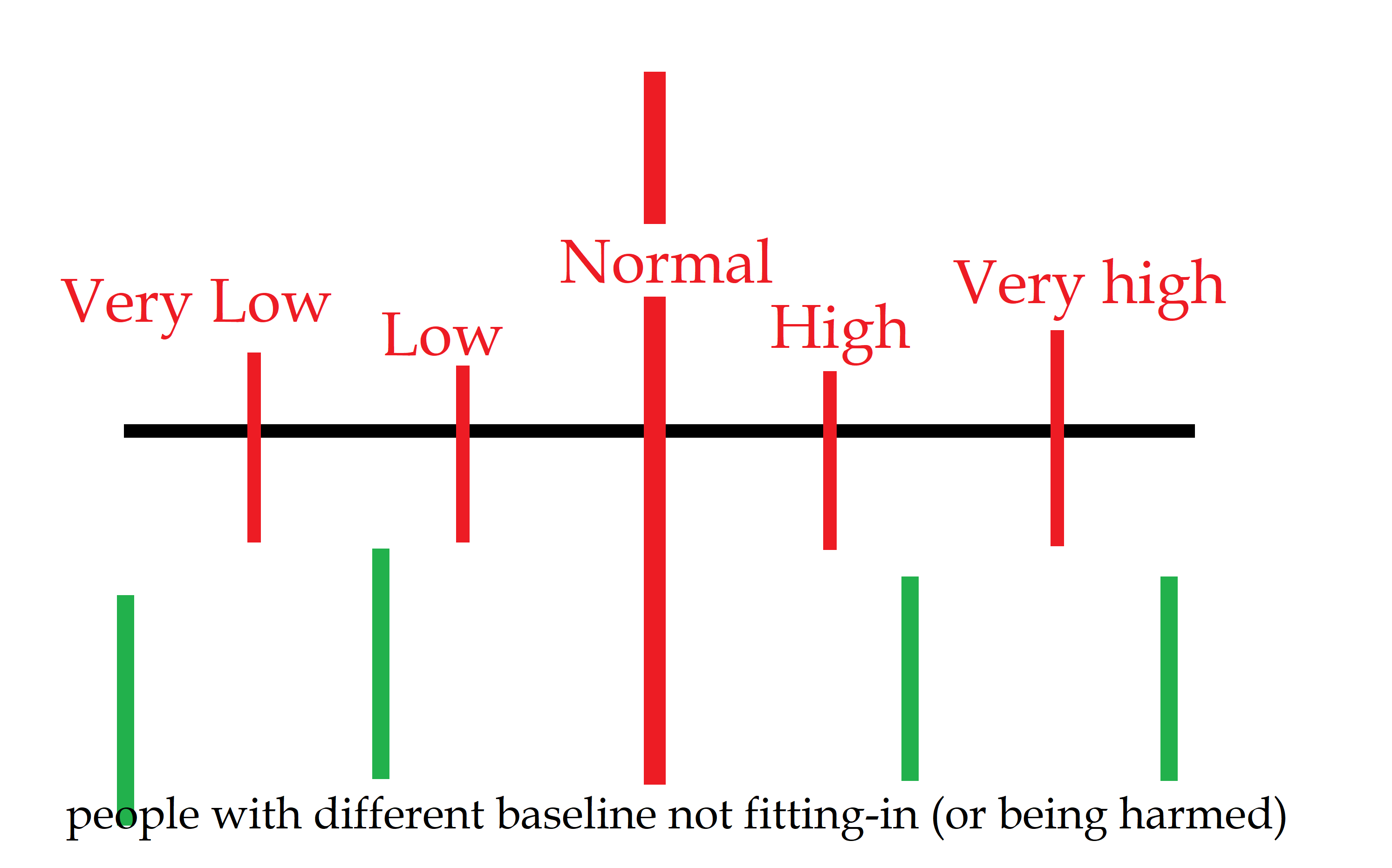
Pathology tends to classify physiological or mental states to "Normal", "More", and "Less". This creates an illusion of one "Normal" size fits all. But there will be people who are outliers in this schema, and "their normal" isn't everyone's normal. Trying to bending back to the accepted normal may actually harm them, for example DSPD (Delayed sleep phase disorder).

While personal narrative is present in interpersonal interactions, and particularly dominant in Western Culture, personal narrative during interactions with medical personnel is reduced to relaying information about specific symptoms of the disability to medical professionals. The medical professionals then interpret the information provided about the disability by the patient to determine a diagnosis, which likely will be linked to biological causes. Medical professionals now define what is "normal" and what is "abnormal" in terms of biology and disability.

In some countries, the medical model of disability has influenced legislation and policy pertaining to persons with disabilities on a national level.

The International Classification of Functioning, Disability and Health (ICF), published in 2001, defines disability as an umbrella term for impairments, activity limitations and participation restrictions. Disability is the interaction between individuals with a health condition (such as cerebral palsy, Down syndrome and depression) and personal and environmental factors (such as negative attitudes, inaccessible transportation and public buildings, and limited social supports).

The altered language and words used show a marked change in emphasis from talking in terms of disease or impairment to talking in terms of levels of health and functioning. According to a 2016 scoping review for the NIHR Journals Library, the WHO's International Classification of Functioning, Disability and Health (ICF) has been valued for its standard terminology and definitions, its ability to provide comparable data across international surveys, and its potential to inform national and international disability policies. The ICF can be used alongside other WHO instruments such as the ICD and has been applied to studies exploring the prevalence of disability and its measurement. It takes into account the social aspects of disability and does not see disability only as a 'medical' or 'biological' dysfunction. That change is consistent with widespread acceptance of the social model of disability.

== Limitations ==
The medical model focuses on individual intervention and treatment as the primary approach to disability. Emphasis is placed on the biological expression of disability rather than the systemic and environmental barriers that can inhibit the lives of people with disabilities. Under the medical model, disabled bodies are defined as something to be corrected, changed, or cured. Some researchers argue terminology used can perpetuate negative labels such as deviant, pathological, and defective. Traditionally, discussions about disability often focuses mainly on biological factors, which potentially overlooks social facts contributing to the experience of disability. Alternatively, the social model presents disability less as an objective fact of the body and mind, and positions it in terms of social relations and barriers that an individual may face in social settings.

The medical model of disability can influence the factors within the creation of medical or disability aides, such as creating aides reminiscent of hospital settings and institutions which can be traumatic to some who have spent an extended period of time there, or which solely reflect the function of hospital aides but not necessarily the function of an aide outside of these contexts.

Among advocates of disability rights, who tend to subscribe to the social model instead, the medical model of disability is often cited as the basis of an unintended social degradation of disabled people (otherwise known as ableism). Resources are seen as excessively misdirected towards an almost-exclusively medical focus when those same resources could potentially be used towards things like universal design and societal inclusionary practices. This includes the monetary and societal costs and benefits of various interventions, be they medical, surgical, social or occupational, from prosthetics, drug-based and other cures, and medical tests such as genetic screening or preimplantation genetic diagnosis. According to disability rights advocates, the medical model of disability is used to justify large investment in these procedures, technologies and research, when adaptation of the disabled person's environment could potentially be more beneficial to the society at large, as well as financially cheaper and physically more attainable.

Also, some disability rights groups see the medical model of disability as a civil rights issue and criticize charitable organizations or medical initiatives that use it in their portrayal of disabled people, because it promotes a pitiable, essentially negative, largely disempowered image of people with disabilities rather than casting disability as a political, social and environmental problem (see also the political slogan "Piss On Pity").

== Healthcare ==
Modern public health research has contributed to the medical model, as qualifications of which conditions and abnormalities constitute as a disability changed with the advancement of science. The centralization of medical knowledge through national research archives contributed greatly to standardized categorization of disability. The emergence of internationally accepted classifications gave rise to newly recognized pathologies of the human condition.

=== Chronic Illness ===
Medical professionals began using the term "chronic illness" with increasing frequency in the 20th century. Physicians commonly used "chronic disease" when addressing patients with prolonged infection, but chronic illness specifically grew in popularity for encompassing disabling illnesses. New vocabulary allowed the medical field to pathologize conditions that were previously accepted as part of the natural process. For example, the physical and mental conditions of elderly patients as well as the development of illnesses that typically arise later in life were previously accepted as inherent qualities acquired through the aging process. With standardized diagnostic terms to categorize this, general trends associated with aging could be consolidated into a formalized framework of disease.

=== Gene Therapies ===
Gene sequencing technologies allow individuals to analyze their genome and identify biomarkers for conditions that may be passed on to any potential offspring. Other techniques, such as CRISPR Cas-9, involve altering gene sequences to repair or replace mutated DNA sequences that could lead to diseases derived from damaged genetic material. These technologies are currently being developed as novel cures for heritable illnesses as well as disabilities, prompting concerns from critics on using genetic alteration as a tool to eliminate disability entirely.

==== Eugenics ====
Technologies like genetic sequencing raise ethical concerns regarding the idea of favoring able-bodied offspring and discouraging the conception of those with societally rejected abnormalities. The advent of genetic counseling and gene-altering therapies to specifically avoid and modify undesirable traits could resemble eugenicist ideologies. The use of medical therapies to remove the possibility or presence of disability and disabling conditions from society as a whole staunchly aligns with concepts from the medical model.

== See also ==
- Cure
- Medical model of autism
- Medicalization
- Models of deafness
- Neurodiversity
