= Madison Ferris =

American actress

- Born: Pennsylvania, U.S.
- Education: Muhlenberg College
- Occupations: Actress, voice over artist, dancer
- Years active: 2014–present
- Known for: The Glass Menagerie 2017 Revival

Madison Ferris is an American actress, best known for portraying Laura Wingfield in The Glass Menagerie.

Ferris moved to New York City, and got her first professional performance opportunity as a paid dancer at the Joyce Theater. Ferris performed in two dance pieces, Ballet (New York) and The Show Must Go On by French choreographer Jerome Bel.

Ferris has Facioscapulohumeral muscular dystrophy and was the first wheelchair user to play a lead on Broadway.

== The Glass Menagerie ==
Ferris was traveling in Australia when the casting notice for Sam Gold's revival of The Glass Menagerie was announced. Ferris flew back to the US for a callback, then was asked back again to read with the play's star, Sally Field. A short time after, Ferris was cast in the role of Laura Wingfield.

Ferris made history as Broadway's first lead actor in a wheelchair. The show opened with the house lights on as Amanda slowly brought Laura up the steps to the stage, right in front of the audience. In discussing how she gave Laura agency, Ferris says,

"We discussed how to make her human, and how to make her a subject of the play rather than an object...We wanted her to be strong; we wanted her to have a voice, to have opinions, to love her family, to want to hang out with Jim O'Connor."
