= Boxcutters (podcast) =

Australian television podcast

Boxcutters was an Australian podcast dedicated to the discussion of television. It was produced weekly, and was usually uploaded on a Monday. Shows average around 70 minutes, although there is no set length, and it is recorded at the studios of 3RRR. It was created by Josh Kinal, Ross McQueen and Brett Cropley, and is currently hosted by Cropley with rotating panelists. Former presenters include John Richards, Courteney Hocking and Dave Lawson. Nelly Thomas was a host throughout 2010.

== History ==
Boxcutters was created in 2005 and on 19 October 2009 it celebrated its 200th edition with guest Myf Warhurst, and congratulatory messages from Margaret Pomeranz, Peter Hitchener and Craig McLachlan. On 6 September 2011 the show presented a 6th birthday special looking at how children are presented on screen.

As well as reporting news, Boxcutters created some in 2008 when they were the first to report that the Nine Network was closing their European news bureau, a story then picked up by The Australian and other media outlets. They also reported the death of Eartha Kitt three weeks before it happened, although this was simply a mistake. They were profiled in The Age Green Guide in 2009.

On 12 April 2009, the show was reviewed on episode 68 of Edgy Reviews from That Podcast Show, with the hosts saying "What may be most refreshing about Boxcutters is the focus on television media that includes other countries' television programs. This is quite the contrast to the saturated market of "TV and Film" podcasts from an all American point of view". On 4 May 2009, Boxcutters was the subject of episode 3 of The Podcraft, with Kinal, Cropley and Richards talking at length to Jade Gulliver.

On 2 December 2009 they were featured on Alan Brough's ABC radio show in a discussion of the best podcasts to listen to, and on 15 July 2010 The Age newspaper picked Boxcutters as one of the world's best podcasts in a list that also included Stephen Fry's podgrams, This American Life and Onion Radio News.

In 2011 they received a Chronos Award for their "Writing Doctor Who" interview with Paul Cornell and Rob Shearman.

2012 saw Boxcutters become the first Australian podcast to ever be invited to perform a live show at the SXSW Interactive festival in Austin, Texas.

== Live events ==
In 2010 Boxcutters also starting producing "live" events. These have usually involved Josh Kinal and John Richards representing the Boxcutters team.

So far these have included an interview with Doctor Who writers Paul Cornell and Rob Shearman at Aussiecon 4 on Sunday 5 September 2010, a presentation on teen dramas Degrassi Junior High and Press Gang at the Australian Centre for the Moving Image on 24 February 2011 which included a live skype interview with actor Pat Mastroianni (Joey Jeremiah in the Degrassi series), a panel about the lack of Australian science fiction aimed at adults at Continuum 7 on 13 June 2011 and a presentation on The Muppet Show - also at ACMI - on 28 July 2011. Most of these events have been later podcasted.

They have also hosted a Eurovision party in 2010 and 2011 and a live show at SXSW in Austin, Texas.

== Guests ==
Boxcutters guests have included:

- Kevin Clash
- Leslie Carrara-Rudolph
- Rajendra Roy
- Craig McLachlan
- Carol-Lynn Parente
- Tim Ferguson
- Pete Smith
