= Inclusion (disability rights) =

Fair incorporation of persons with disabilities in society

Video produced by a network of Mexican museums and Wiki Learning Tec de Monterrey to promote accessibility to cultural institutions in Mexico.

Inclusion, in relation to persons with disabilities, is defined as including individuals with disabilities in everyday activities and ensuring they have access to resources and opportunities in ways that are similar to their non-disabled peers. Disability rights advocates define true inclusion as results-oriented, rather than focused merely on encouragement. To this end, communities, businesses, and other groups and organizations are considered inclusive if people with disabilities do not face barriers to participation and have equal access to opportunities and resources.

Common barriers to full social and economic inclusion of persons with disabilities include inaccessible physical environments and methods of public transportation, lack of assistive devices and technologies, non-adapted means of communication, gaps in service delivery. Discriminatory prejudice and stigma in society, and systems and policies that are either non-existent or that hinder the involvement of all people with a health condition in all areas of life.

Inclusion advocates argue that one of the key barriers to inclusion is ultimately the medical model of disability, which supposes that a disability inherently reduces the individual's quality of life and aims to use medical intervention to diminish or correct the disability. Interventions focus on physical and/or mental therapies, medications, surgeries, and assistive devices. Inclusion advocates, who generally adhere to the social model of disability, allege that this approach is wrong and that those who have physical, sensory, intellectual, and/or developmental impairments have better outcomes if, instead, it is not assumed that they have a lower quality of life and they are not looked at as though they need to be "fixed."

== Approaches ==
Inclusion is ultimately a multifaceted practice that involves a variety of approaches across cultures and settings. It is an approach that seeks to ensure that people of differing abilities visibly and palpably belong to, are engaged in, and are actively connected to the goals and objectives of the wider society.

Universal design is one of the key concepts in and approaches to disability inclusion. It involves designing buildings, products, or environments in a way that secures accessibility and usability to the greatest extent possible.

Disability mainstreaming is simultaneously a method, a policy, and a tool for achieving social inclusion. In short, it is a process that is centered on integrating formerly marginalized individuals into "mainstream" society. This is accomplished by making "the needs and experiences of persons with disabilities an integral part of the design, implementation, monitoring, and evaluation of policies and programs in all political, economic, and societal spheres so that persons with disabilities benefit equally and so that inequality is not perpetuated." In educational settings, it is the practice of placing students with special education services in a general education classroom during specific time periods based on their skills to enable a person with a disability to take part in a "mainstream" environment without added difficulty by creating inclusive settings. For example, education initiatives such as IDEA or No Child Left Behind promote inclusive schooling or mainstreaming for children with disabilities, such as autism, so that they can participate in the community at large.

== Inclusion in the United States ==
In the United States, federal laws that pertain to individuals with disabilities aim to create an inclusive environment by promoting mainstreaming, nondiscrimination, reasonable accommodations, and universal design. There are three key federal laws that protect the rights of people with disabilities and attempt to ensure their inclusion in many aspects of society.

Section 504 of the Rehabilitation Act of 1973 protects individuals from discrimination based on disability. The nondiscrimination requirements of the law apply to employers and organizations that receive financial assistance from federal departments or agencies. It created and extended civil rights to people with disabilities and allows for reasonable accommodations, such as special study areas and assistance as necessary for each student.

The United States Department of Justice published the Americans with Disabilities Act (ADA) in 1990. It is a civil rights law that protects the civil liberties of individuals with disabilities. As it pertains to universal design, the ADA requires covered employers and organizations to provide reasonable accommodations to employees with disabilities and imposes accessibility requirements on public accommodations. The ADA guarantees equal opportunity for individuals with disabilities in several areas: Employment; Public accommodations (such as restaurants, hotels, libraries, private schools, etc.); Transportation; State and local government services; Telecommunications (such as telephones, televisions, and computers).

The Patient Protection and Affordable Care Act, which was published in 2010, touches on disability inclusion in that it designates disability status as a demographic category and mandates data collection to assess health disparities.

While laws have been created to ensure physical access, such as mandatory wheelchair ramps, the disabled community still does not have a high rate of participation in cultural activities. Additionally, the attitudes and prejudices held by people without disabilities towards the disabled community remain a persistent issue. To this end, when it comes to societal perceptions of individuals with disabilities, barriers to inclusion generally include other people's behaviors, misunderstandings, lack of awareness about disabilities, and even a lack of understanding about the functions performed by service animals. This is in addition to physical barriers already present, including transportation, level of lighting, or handicap accessible buildings and equipment.

== See also ==
- Augmentative and alternative communication
- Disability Flag
- Reasonable accommodation
- Social model of disability
- Universal design
