= Kalyn Heffernan =

American rapper

Kalyn Heffernan is an American activist and the leader of the band Wheelchair Sports Camp.

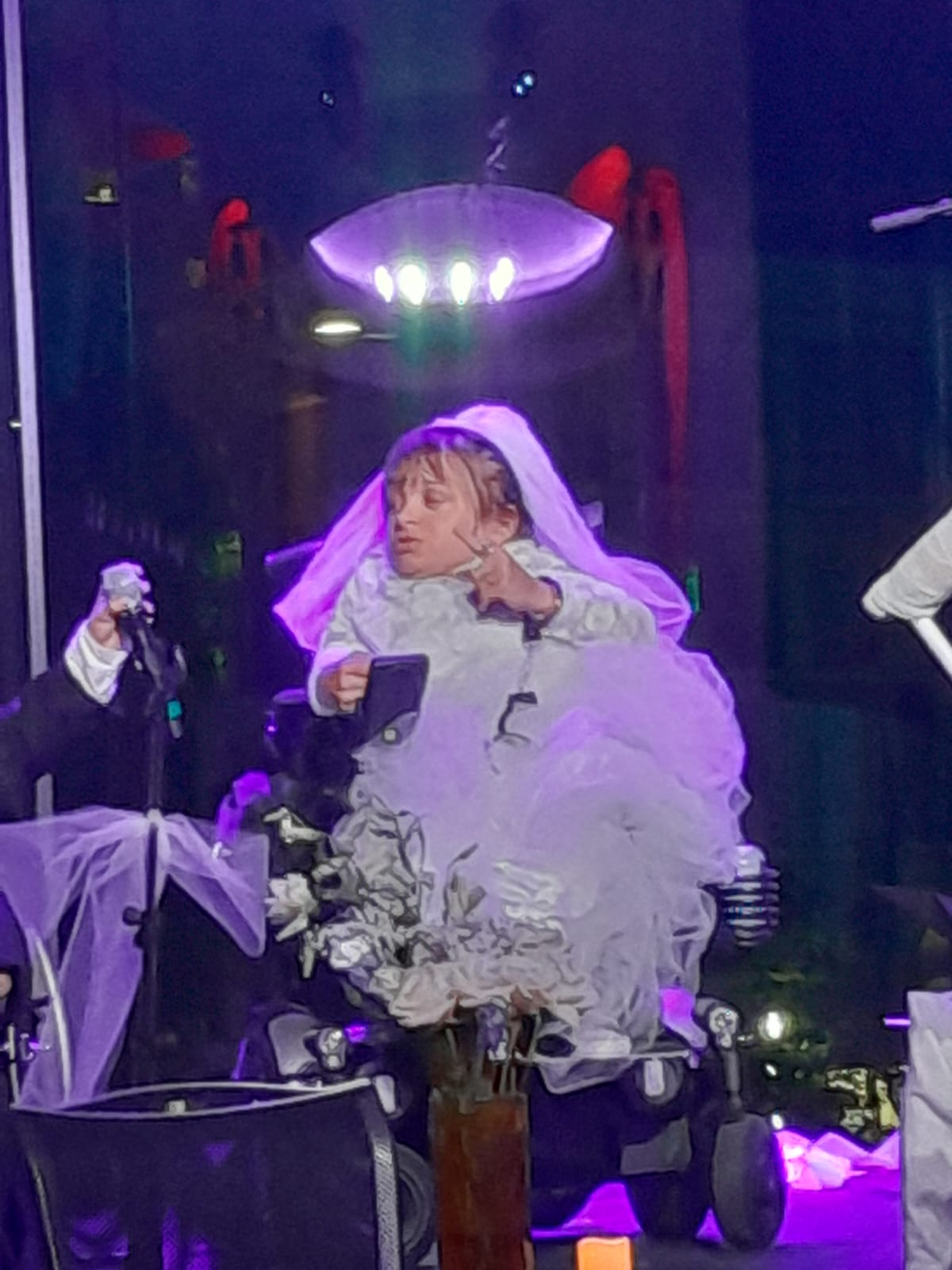
Kalyn leading the Wheelchair Sports Camp band performance at Untitled: Artist Takeover, Denver Art Museum, July 26, 2025

== Life ==
Heffernan was born in Denver, spent her early life in Southern California, and returned to Denver at age 8. She was born with the genetic disorder osteogenesis imperfecta. Heffernan is a community activist, participating in a 2017 ADAPT sit-in at Senator Cory Gardner's office to protest a proposed healthcare bill that would have cut Medicaid by $722 billion. In 2018, Heffernan announced her intention to "sit" as a candidate for the 2019 Denver mayoral race.

Heffernan is queer, and was named as one of "Eight Openly Queer Rappers to Watch" by ColorLines. She received a 2016 Westword MasterMind award in recognition of her work co-founding Royalty Free Haiti, a partnership between artists in Haiti and Denver and in 2018, Westword's "Best of Denver" named her the year's "Best Activist Musician."
