= Stella Young =

Australian comedian, journalist and disability advocate (1982–2014)

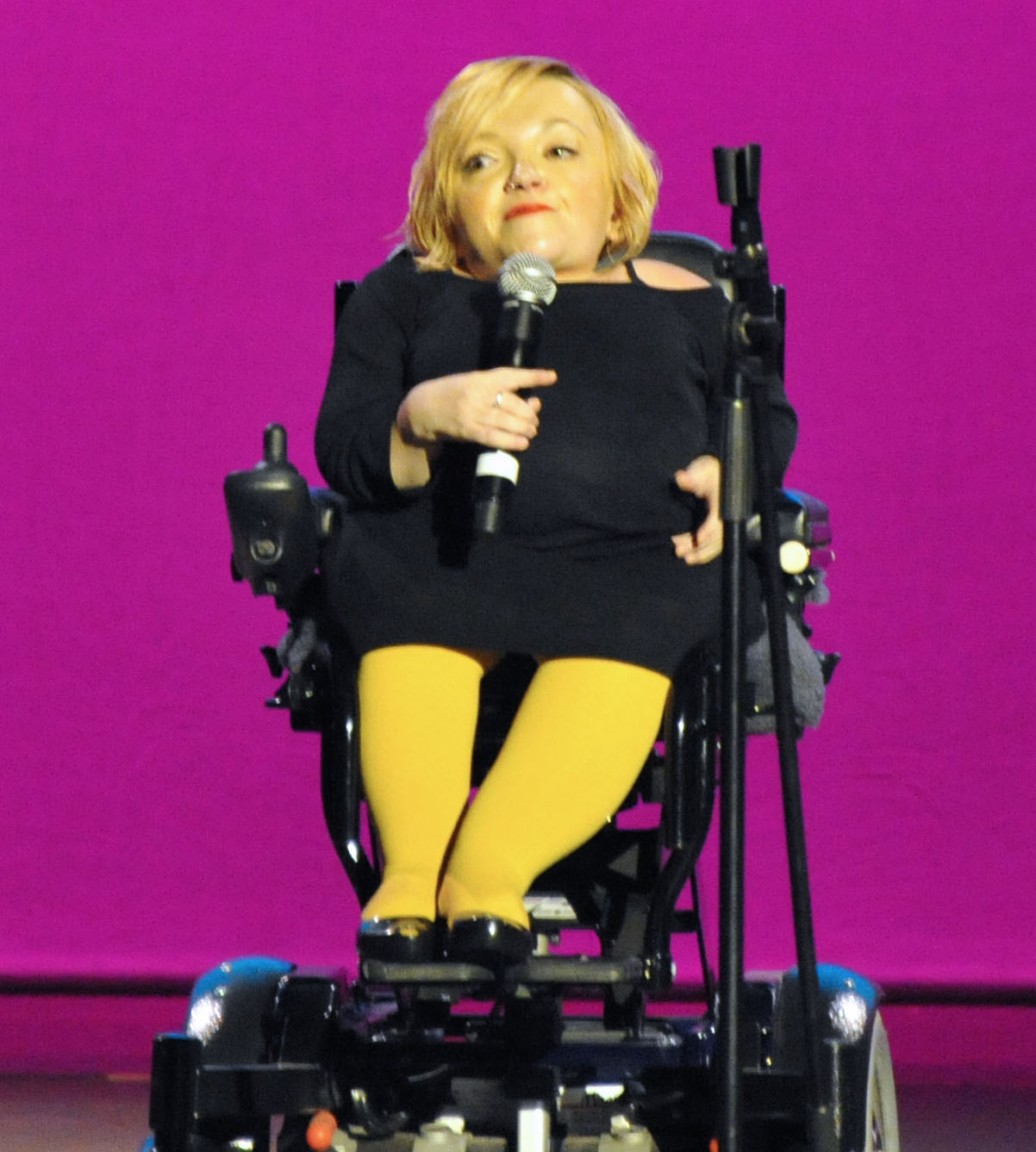
- Born: 24 February 1982; Stawell, Victoria, Australia
- Died: 6 December 2014 (aged 32); Melbourne, Victoria, Australia
- Education: Deakin University; University of Melbourne
- Occupations: Journalist and comedian
- Known for: coining term 'Inspiration porn'
- Website: stellayoung.com

Stella Jane Young (24 February 1982 – 6 December 2014) was an Australian comedian, journalist and disability rights activist.

== Early life and education ==
Young was born in 1982 at Stawell, Victoria. She was born with osteogenesis imperfecta and used a wheelchair for most of her life. At the age of 14 she audited the accessibility of the main street businesses of her hometown.

She held a Bachelor of Arts in Journalism and Public Relations from Deakin University, Geelong and a Graduate Diploma in Education from the University of Melbourne. After graduating in 2004, she worked for a time as a secondary school teacher.

== Career ==
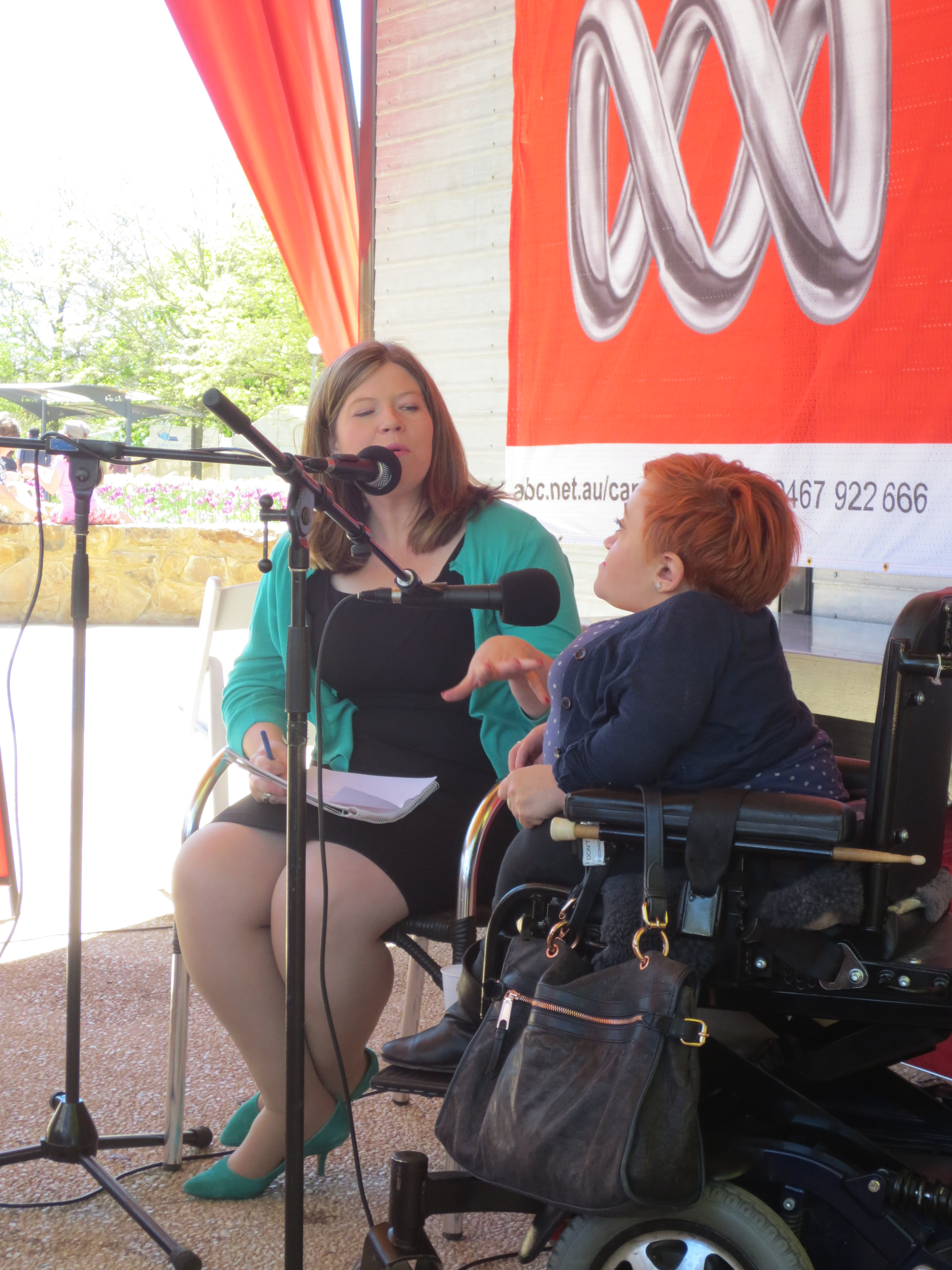
Stella Young being interviewed at Floriade in 2013

Long before her international acclaim, at just 14 years old, Stella undertook a hands-on accessibility audit of the businesses along the main street in her hometown of Stawell, Victoria. This early project revealed a severely limited list of accessible venues, laying groundwork for her lifelong pursuit of structural inclusion rather than superficial accommodation. Expanding her advocacy into the arts and entertainment sector, she worked alongside the Youth Disability Advocacy Service to establish the Live Access Project. This initiative specifically lobbied for and pushed toward better physical access to live music venues for disabled patrons and artist.

Young served as the editor for the Australian Broadcasting Corporation's online magazine Ramp Up. Before joining the ABC, she had worked as an educator in public programs at Melbourne Museum, and hosted eight seasons of No Limits, a disability culture program on community television station Channel 31.

In a Ramp Up editorial published in July 2012 she deconstructed society's habit of turning disabled people into what she called "inspiration porn", the idea that disabled people can do certain things "in spite" of their disability and are used to motivate non-disabled people, rather than uplifting disabled people. The concept was further popularized in her April 2014 TEDxSydney talk, titled "I'm not your inspiration, thank you very much".

Having previously appeared in several comedy showcases and group shows, Stella made her festival debut as a solo performer at the 2014 Melbourne International Comedy Festival. Her show Tales from the Crip, directed by Nelly Thomas, won her the award for best newcomer at the festival.

She was a member of the boards of the Ministerial Advisory Council for the Department of Victorian Communities, Victorian Disability Advisory Council, the Youth Disability Advocacy Service and Women with Disabilities Victoria.

== Death ==
Young died unexpectedly in Melbourne, on 6 December 2014 of a suspected aneurysm.

== Legacy ==
In 2017, Young was inducted posthumously onto the Victorian Honour Roll of Women in recognition of her work as a "journalist, comedian, feminist and fierce disability activist".

In 2020, S3.E7 of Loudermilk "Wind Beneath My Wings", was dedicated to the memory of Stella Young. The episode looks at the way our society views disability. Actor Mat Fraser plays Roger Frostly who quotes Young and her calls for an end to inauthentic "Inspiration Porn".

In 2023 a bronze statue of Young in her wheelchair by sculptor Danny Fraser was unveiled in her hometown of Stawell in Cato Park. Motion-activated audio at the statue provides a description to provide greater accessibility. As part of the Remembering Stella Young project the https://stellayoung.com.au/ website was created.

A street in the Canberra suburb of Denman Prospect, Stella Young Way, is named in her honour.

== Bibliography ==
=== Contributed chapter ===
- "The politics of exclusion", pp. 246–256, in: Destroying the joint, edited by Jane Caro, Read How You Want (2015, ISBN 9781459687295).
