= Models of deafness =

Frameworks explaining perspectives on deafness: cultural, social, and medical models

The three models of deafness are rooted in either social or biological sciences. These are the cultural model, the social model, and the medical (or infirmity) model. The model through which the deaf person is viewed can impact how they are treated as well as their own self perception. In the cultural model, the Deaf belong to a culture in which they are neither infirm nor disabled, but rather have their own fully grammatical and natural language. In the medical model, deafness is viewed undesirable, and it is to the advantage of the individual as well as society as a whole to "cure" this condition. The social model seeks to explain difficulties experienced by deaf individuals that are due to their environment.

== Cultural model ==
Within the cultural model of deafness, Deaf people see themselves as a linguistic and cultural minority community rather than a "disability group". Advocates of Deaf culture use a capital "D" to distinguish cultural Deafness from deafness as a pathology.

Deaf culture is distinct in that the inability to hear is not seen as a "loss" or something that negatively impacts an individual's quality of life. It is an asset of and for the Deaf community to be deaf in behavior, values, knowledge and fluency in sign language. The experience of the Deaf being a language minority is comparable to other minorities' native languages being important to group identification and the preservation of their culture. Deaf clubs (such as NAD- The National Association of the Deaf) and Deaf schools have played large roles in the preservation of sign language and Deaf culture. Residential schools for deaf children serve as a vital link in the transmission of the rich culture and language, seeing as they are ideal environments for children to acquire and master sign language and pass on Deaf cultural values. Like all educational settings, these environments are key to providing deaf children valuable life lessons and skills that will help them prosper in any environment they may find themselves in.

Rather than embrace the view that deafness is a "personal tragedy", the Deaf community contrasts the medical model of deafness by seeing all aspects of the deaf experience as positive. The birth of a deaf child is seen as a cause for celebration. Deaf people point to the perspective on child rearing they share with hearing people. For example, hearing parents may feel that they relate to their hearing child because of their experience and intimate understanding of the hearing state of being. It follows that a Deaf parent will have easier experiences raising a deaf child since Deaf parents have an intimate understanding of the deaf state of being. Evidence of Deaf parental success is revealed in scholastic achievement. Deaf children who have Deaf parents that communicate in sign language from birth, generally perform better in their academics than other deaf children with hearing parents. This includes children who adapted using speech and lipreading, prosthetic devices such as cochlear implants, hearing aid technology, and artificial language systems such as Signing Exact English and Cued Speech. Deaf children acquiring sign languages from birth also reach language milestones at similar rates to their hearing counterparts, unlike deaf children born to hearing parents acquiring speech.

Members of the Deaf community define deafness as a matter of culturally determined behaviors rather than an audiological factor. Thus, those within the Deaf community tend to be, but are not limited to, deaf people, especially congenitally deaf people whose primary language is the sign language of their nation or community, as well as their hearing or deaf children (hearing children of Deaf adults are typically called CODAs: Child of Deaf adult), families, friends and other members of their social networks. This cultural model of deafness represents the natural evolution of the social networks of a minority language group. From the conceptual framework of the cultural model come implicit questions, such as: "How is deafness influenced by the physical and social environment in which it is embedded? What are the interdependent values, mores, art forms, traditions, organizations, and language that characterize this culture?"

== Social model ==
The social model of deafness stems from the social model of disability. The concept of social disability was created by people who are disabled themselves, their families, friends, and associated social and political networks. Professionals in the human services fields and the social sciences greatly contributed to the social model. This model describes a person's disability on the basis of two factors:

1. the physical or mental traits that cause this disability
2. their environment, as it is influenced by the perception of others.

Through this lens individuals who are deaf are considered disabled due to their inability to hear, which hearing counterparts in their surroundings have historically viewed as a disadvantage. Deaf people may also have other disabilities. People with disabilities affirm that the design of the environment often disables them. In more accessible environments where those that are deaf have access to language that is not only spoken they are disabled less, or not at all. Areas where hearing and deaf individuals interact, called contact zones, often leave deaf individuals at a disadvantage because of the environment being tailored to suit the needs of the hearing counterpart. The history of Martha's Vineyard, when looking specifically at Martha's Vineyard Sign Language, supports this notion. At one point in time, the deaf population on the island was so great that it was commonplace for hearing residents to know and use both signed and spoken language to communicate with their neighbors. In this environmental design, it was not "bad" or "disabling" if one was not able to hear in order to communicate. With certain disabilities, medical intervention can improve subsequent health issues. This is true to parts of the deaf population, as in some cases hearing can be gained with the assistance of medical technologies. The social model acknowledges the hard truth that medical intervention does not address societal issues that prevail - regardless of its extent or success.

In addition to changing environments from disabling to enabling atmospheres, advocates of the social model support the complete integration of disabled people into society. They encourage maximum integration with peers who are not disabled by their environment, especially, but not exclusively, in the school setting. Ultimately, the goal of proponents of the social model is to ensure all people are fully able to enjoy "all human rights and fundamental freedoms". The social model of disability's ideology of "all-inclusive" school environments is not adhered to in the cultural model. Residential schools separate deaf and hard of hearing children from their hearing counterparts. The existence of these schools demonstrate an example of respecting and embracing the totality of the deaf experience rather than dismissing it. While the social model's promotion of inclusion at every level is a great principle, it may not always be the best environment in practice. In the case of deafness, there is a lot a child can miss in a mainstreamed schooling environment. In a poorly constructed mainstreamed environment, fostering relationships with classmates may be difficult and auditory important material shared verbally by teachers may be missed. As a result, the child may fall behind both academically and socially. In residential school settings, these challenges may not be experienced to the same degree, and would allow for deaf children's social and academic lives to instead flourish.

== Medical model ==
The medical model of deafness originates from medical, social welfare and majority cultural notions of the absence of the ability to hear as being an illness or a physical disability. It stems from a more comprehensive and far-reaching medical model of disability. Under the perspective that deafness is an impairment, the inability to hear interferes with a person's ability to respond to environmental cues, to communicate, and to enjoy aspects of mainstream culture such as music. People who experience hearing loss after acquiring a mastery of spoken language as well as those who are hard-of-hearing commonly identify with this model.

Within the medical model deafness is conceptualized from a "personal tragedy" stance, indicating that it should be avoided, eradicated, or normalized by all possible means. Often, the attitudes of professionals own assumptions of deafness as tragedy promote responses of loss; thus, hearing parents may experience diagnosis of their child's deafness as a tragedy with reactions of grief. Similarly, common reactions such as stress and anger are not necessarily understandable psychological responses to deafness, but may result from situations in which parents have not encountered in others an adequate response to their needs and questions.

While medical ethics and law dictate that it is up to the patient (or the patient's legal representative) to decide the treatments he or she wishes, the press and professional literature are increasingly normalizing the discussion regarding using cochlear implants, oral education, and mainstream placement; all being popular choices under the medical model of deafness. The medical model suggests that, overall, the effects of deafness may be lessened through the use of technology such as hearing aids, cochlear implants, assistive listening devices, and lip reading. Similarly, doctors and scientists who engage in research are doing so simply because there is demand for information and for techniques which can restore hearing. The view that deafness is a "disability" also has economic consequences in political environments concerned with social welfare. It is the basis on which the governments in many developed countries provide financial support for the cost of cochlear implants and other therapies.

Under the medical model of deafness, implicit questions may naturally arise, such as: "By what criteria and by whom is the impairment construed as an infirmity; how did the infirmity arise; what are the risks and benefits of the available treatment, if any; what can be done to minimize the disabling effects of the infirmity?"

== See also ==
- Deaf culture
- Gallaudet University – school for advanced education of the deaf and hard-of-hearing
- Medical model of disability
- Social model of disability
- Models of disability
