= Spastic (word) =

Word

In medicine, the adjective spastic refers to an alteration in muscle tone affected by the medical condition spasticity, which is a well-known symptomatic phenomenon seen in patients with a wide range of central neurological disorders, including spinal cord injury, cerebral palsy (for example, spastic diplegia), stroke, amyotrophic lateral sclerosis (ALS), and multiple sclerosis (MS), as well as conditions such as "spastic colon". The word is derived via Latin from the Greek spastikos ("drawing in", "tugging" or "shaking uncontrollably").

Colloquially, the noun spastic, originally a medical term, is now pejorative; though its offensiveness differs between the United States and United Kingdom.

== United Kingdom and Ireland ==
The medical term "spastic" came into use to describe cerebral palsy. The Scottish Council for Spastics was founded in 1946, and the National Spastics Society, an English charity for people with cerebral palsy, was founded in 1951. However, the word began to be used as an insult and became a term of abuse used to imply stupidity or physical ineptness: a person who is uncoordinated or incompetent, or a fool. It was often colloquially abbreviated to shorter forms such as 'spaz'; in Ireland, the term was frequently shortened to 'spa' and used as an insult.

Although the word has a much longer history, its pejorative use grew considerably in the 1980s and this is sometimes attributed to the BBC children's television entertainment programme Blue Peter; during the International Year of Disabled Persons (1981), several editions of Blue Peter featured a man named Joey Deacon with cerebral palsy, who was described as a "spastic". Phrases such as "joey", "deacon", "spacker" and "spaz" became widely used insults amongst children at that time.

In 1994, the same year that Conservative MP Terry Dicks referred to himself in a House of Commons debate as "a spastic with cerebral palsy", the Spastics Society changed its name to Scope. The word has been deemed unacceptable to use outside of specific medical contexts, thus reducing stigmatisation of the condition. Some UK schoolchildren adopted a derogatory adaptation of the Spastic Society's new name, "scoper". The current understanding of the word is well-illustrated by a BBC survey in 2003, which found that "spastic" was the second most offensive term in the UK relating to anyone with a disability. (The word "retard" was deemed most offensive in the US and other countries). In 2007, Lynne Murphy, a linguist at the University of Sussex, described the term as being "one of the most taboo insults to a British ear".

== United States ==
In American slang, the term 'spaz' has evolved from a derogatory description of people with disabilities, and is generally understood as a casual word for clumsiness, otherness, sometimes associated with overexcitability, excessive startle response ("jumpiness"), excessive energy, involuntary or random movement, or hyperactivity. Some of these associations use the symptoms of cerebral palsy and other related disabilities as insults.

Its usage has been documented as far back as the mid-1950s. In 1965, film critic Pauline Kael, hypothesised that, "The term that American teenagers now use as the opposite of 'tough' is 'spaz'."

Ben Zimmer, editor for American dictionaries at Oxford University Press, and researcher at the University of Pennsylvania's Institute for Research in Cognitive Sciences, writes that by the mid-1960s the American usage of the term 'spaz' shifted from "its original sense of 'spastic or physically uncoordinated person' to something more like 'nerdy, weird, or uncool person'", all with a negative sense.

In a June 2005 newsletter for American Dialect Society, Zimmer reports that the "earliest [written] occurrence of uncoordinated 'spaz' he could find" is in The Elastik Band's 1967 "undeniably tasteless, garage-rock single" – "Spazz".

Later in 1978, American comedian Steve Martin introduced a character Charles Knerlman, a.k.a. "Chaz the Spaz" on Saturday Night Live (SNL), in a skit with Bill Murray called "Nerds". Murray later starred in the film Meatballs (1979), which had a character named "Spaz". Both shows portrayed a "spaz" as a nerd or with potential cognitive or learning disabilities in a comic setting, reinforcing the more casual negative use of the term in the United States by using it in popular comedy.

The term still occasionally appears in North American movies or TV series, such as Friends (1994–2004), as a pejorative word which reflects a certain degree of casual ableism. As such, it receives a different reaction from British and American audiences. In one episode, Rachel refers to herself as a "laundry spaz" due to her inability to competently do the laundry; this relates to the original meaning about physical ability. This comment was deemed offensive enough by the British Board of Film Classification (BBFC) to give the episode a 12 rating. Other episodes in the series are rated a step lower as PG. Similarly, the Rugrats direct-to-DVD film: Tales from the Crib: Snow White got a PG rating based on Angelica calling Kimi "Spazzy".

The difference in qualitative assessment of the term between British and American audiences is demonstrated by reactions to comments by American professional golfer Tiger Woods after losing the US Masters Tournament in 2006. He said, "I was so in control from tee to green, the best I've played for years ... But as soon as I got on the green I was a spaz." His remarks were broadcast and drew no known public attention in the United States. But they were widely reported in the United Kingdom, where they caused offence and were condemned by a representative of Scope and Tanni Grey-Thompson, a prominent paralympian. On learning of the furor over his comments, Woods' representative promptly apologized.

Shortly after "Weird Al" Yankovic's song "Word Crimes" (2014) was released, Yankovic said that he had been unaware that the word "spastic" as used in the song is "considered a highly offensive slur by some people", particularly in the United Kingdom. He apologized for having it in his lyrics.

Lizzo's 2022 song "Grrrls" included the word "spaz". The song was criticized and she was asked to remove this content (classified as expressing an ableist slur) from the lyrics. After the backlash, Lizzo posted her stance against derogatory language; she has since announced a new version of "Grrrls" with new lyrics. Similarly, Beyoncé's 2022 song "Heated" from her seventh studio album Renaissance included the word. It was strongly criticized and the word was eventually removed from the song.

== Australia ==
A historical Australian road sign encouraging drivers to watch out for "Spastic Pedestrians". The sign is no longer in official use

In Australian English, for some time, terms such as "spastic" and "crippled" were considered the proper words to describe persons with various disabilities and even appeared on traffic signs warning drivers of such persons near the road. More recently, these terms have fallen out of use and replaced with the more socially acceptable and generic "disabled". The word "spastic" became so negatively loaded that the Spastic Society of Victoria had to change its name to Scope.

== Products using the term ==
Multiple products in the United States have names or content including the word spaz or spastic.

Controversy arises if products are sold in the UK under the same name. In particular the manufacturers and importers of the Spazz wheelchair were criticised by the British charity Scope when they put the wheelchair on sale in the UK. Scope expressed a fear that such a brand would spur use of the word again as an insult. Such negative usage had declined since the 1980s.

On 29 June 2007, Ubisoft of France withdrew one of their games called Mind Quiz on the Nintendo DS and PlayStation Portable, for referring to players who did not perform well at the game as "Super Spastic". The company stated, "As soon as we were made aware of the issue we stopped distribution of the product and are now working with retailers to pull the game off the market." One month later, Nintendo recalled Mario Party 8 because the term was used in in-game dialogue.

== See also ==
- Ableism
- Disability abuse
- Disability hate crime
- Euphemism
- Spasm
