= Hacienda HealthCare sexual abuse case =

Rape of an incapacitated patient in Phoenix, Arizona

The Hacienda HealthCare sexual abuse case was a high-profile sexual abuse case involving an incapacitated disabled woman who was raped many times and impregnated by a licensed practical nurse at the Hacienda HealthCare facility in Phoenix, Arizona, United States. Although the investigation took place in 2021, the sexual abuse was long term, and may have gone unnoticed for years. It also prompted the State of Arizona to make drastic changes to the way their long-term care facilities are managed.

Other well-known pregnancies involving sexually abused vegetative and comatose female patients have also been reported in New York in 1996, Massachusetts in 1998, and Argentina in 2015.

== The victim ==
The woman, originally from the San Carlos Apache Indian Reservation, has been in the facility since 1992 at the age of three. To protect her anonymity, she has not been named by news sources. Born in April 1989, the woman has an intellectual disability and is non-verbal as a result of multiple childhood seizures she has had since she was two months old. The woman can experience pain and respond with facial gestures and some vocal sounds, such as crying when experiencing discomfort. She can also respond to auditory stimuli and has some limited ability to move her head, neck, and limbs. Also, the woman would often thrash her arms while hooked up to a ventilator.

The woman had been cared for by Hacienda HealthCare, a non-profit entity receiving state funds, since childhood. She was reported to be 29 years old at the time the investigation took place in 2019.

== Sexual abuse ==
The victim was repeatedly raped, likely over many years, by Nathan Sutherland, a 36-year-old man who was married with four children at the time of the investigation. She had been in the care of Sutherland hundreds of times from 2012 to 2018. She sustained injuries from repeated sexual assault, including vaginal trauma and gaping of the perineum, and had experienced both vaginal and anal rape. Sutherland was going through a divorce in late 2018, and his co-workers had noticed that he had been highly stressed at the time, but thought it was due to stress from the divorce.

== Pregnancy and birth ==
The victim became pregnant in 2018 while under full-time care at the Hacienda HealthCare facility. The woman's pregnancy had gone completely unnoticed by healthcare facility staff until she gave birth on December 29, 2018. Instead, facility staff had treated her for constipation and weight gain, and even reduced her caloric intake.

The woman gave birth to a baby boy on the afternoon of December 29, 2018 without any major complications. However, immediately after facility staff had attended to the birth, the newborn baby was not breathing and had to be resuscitated. The newborn may grow up to have developmental problems, as the mother was on many different types of medications such as phenobarbital and had not received any pregnancy-related care.

== Investigation ==
On December 29, Hacienda HealthCare staff promptly called 911 when they discovered that the woman had given birth. An investigation was promptly launched, with DNA samples taken from all male nurses at the Hacienda HealthCare facility. On January 22, 2019, the DNA results of the newborn baby were matched with Nathan Sutherland's DNA, who was then arrested that same day. Sutherland then voluntarily gave up his nursing license on January 24, following his arrest.

According to one gynecologist there was "no doubt" that the victim had experienced pain, and that the lack of monitoring during the woman's pregnancy and childbirth could have easily resulted in fetal death. However, it is difficult to determine whether the victim had in fact been pregnant multiple times.

== Aftermath ==
Hacienda HealthCare's CEO Bill Timmons resigned on January 7, with Arizona state governor Doug Ducey also calling for the resignation of Hacienda HealthCare's board of directors. The Hacienda HealthCare facility was closed soon afterwards in February 2019, which had 37 residents in its care at the time. One physician at the facility resigned, while another was suspended. Later, investigators also found maggots on a male patient at the Hacienda HealthCare facility, prompting the Arizona Department of Health Services to revoke the healthcare facility's license due to negligence. However, Hacienda HealthCare regained its license on May 1, with Perry Petrilli appointed as acting CEO.

In the wake of the investigation, the State of Arizona has vowed to improve oversight of all care facilities in the state.

== Lawsuit and trial ==
The victim's family filed a $45 million lawsuit against the State of Arizona, which accused the state of "gross negligence," and that it had "cultivated circumstances" which allowed for the lack of monitoring in long-term care facilities. The lawsuit sought a $25 million settlement for the victim, a $10 million settlement for the victim's father, and an additional $10 million for her mother.

The lawsuit also claimed that the family had requested for female nurses to take care of their daughter since 2002 when staff claimed that their daughter had been "touched inappropriately," but this request had never been carried out by the facility.

Nathan Sutherland, defended by attorney David Gregan, pleaded not guilty on February 5, 2019.

In June 2021, the parties reached a $15 million settlement, which is in addition to a $7.5 million settlement from the State of Arizona.

In September 2021, Sutherland pleaded guilty to sexual assault and abuse of a vulnerable adult.

In December 2021, Sutherland was sentenced to 10 years in prison, receiving credit for time served, amounting to about three years.

== See also ==
- Sexual abuse and intellectual disability
- Disability abuse
