= Disability in Russia =

Many disabled people face poor provision of facilities, and disabled children are commonly institutionalized, even though Russia is a party to the United Nations Convention on the Rights of Persons with Disabilities, having signed the treaty on 24 September 2008, and ratified it four years later, on 25 September 2012.

== History ==
In the Pre-Soviet era, Commissariats for Invalid Welfare were responsible for services for disabled people. Welfare co-operatives, mutual aid societies, and charitable societies were also involved. Between 1929 and 1932, it was estimated that the disabled population was made up of 43% war veterans, 32% industrially injured, and the remainder through accidents and disability at birth. In March 1921, 775,000 wooden arms and legs for disabled soldiers were produced. In 1926, there were estimated 15 blind persons per 10,000 population. There were up to 21,000 disabled people in homes.

== Sport ==
Russia has competed at the Paralympic Games as different nations in its history: as part of the Soviet Union at the 1988 Summer and Winter Games; after the dissolution of the Soviet Union in 1991, Russia competed as part of the Unified Team in the 1992 Summer Paralympics; they competed for a first time as Russia at the 1994 Winter Paralympics and since then in all the summer and winter games. The 2014 Winter Paralympics was held in Sochi, the first time that Russia hosted the Paralympic Games.
