= Hate crime laws in the United States =

State and federal laws intended to protect against bias crimes

Hate crime laws in the United States are state and federal laws which are intended to protect people from hate crimes (also known as bias crimes). While state laws vary, current statutes permit federal prosecution of hate crimes committed on the basis of a person's characteristics such as a person's race, religion, ethnicity, disability, nationality, gender, sexual orientation, and/or gender identity. The U.S. Department of Justice (DOJ), Federal Bureau of Investigation (FBI), and campus police departments are required to collect and publish hate crime statistics.

== Federal ==
=== Title I of the Civil Rights Act of 1968 ===
Title I of the Civil Rights Act of 1968, enacted 18 U.S.C. § 245(b)(2), permits federal prosecution of anyone who "willfully injures, intimidates or interferes with, or attempts to injure, intimidate or interfere with ... any person because of his race, color, religion or national origin" or because of the victim's attempt to engage in one of six types of federally protected activities, such as attending school, patronizing a public place/facility, applying for employment, acting as a juror in a state court, or voting.

People convicted of violating this law face a fine or imprisonment of up to one year, or both. If bodily injury results or if such acts of intimidation involve the use of firearms, explosives or fire, individuals can receive prison terms of up to 10 years, while crimes involving kidnapping, sexual assault, or murder can be punishable by life in prison or the death penalty. U.S. District Courts provide for criminal sanctions only. The Violence Against Women Act of 1994 contained a provision at 42 U.S.C. § 13981 which allowed victims of gender-motivated hate crimes to seek "compensatory and punitive damages, injunctive and declaratory relief, and such other relief as a court may deem appropriate".

=== Violent Crime Control and Law Enforcement Act (1994) ===
The Violent Crime Control and Law Enforcement Act, enacted in 28 U.S.C. § 994 note Sec. 280003, requires the United States Sentencing Commission to increase the penalties for hate crimes committed on the basis of the actual or perceived race, color, religion, national origin, ethnicity, or gender of any person. In 1995, the Sentencing Commission implemented these changes to the Federal Sentencing Guidelines, which only apply to federal crimes.

=== Church Arson Prevention Act (1996) ===
The S. 1980 (104th): Church Arson Prevention Act of 1996 was introduced to Congress on June 19, 1996, but died because the Senate Committee found some places for improvement of the bill. It was sponsored by Republican Duncan Faircloth. On May 23, 1996, the House of Representatives introduced H.R. 3525 (104th): Church Arson Prevention Act. The Act was passed by both houses in Congress and signed by President Bill Clinton on July 3, 1996. This bill became law number Pub.L. 104–155. It was sponsored by Republican Henry Hyde. The bill was summarized by the Congressional Research Service as follows: "[the Church Arson Prevention Act of 1996] makes Federal criminal code prohibitions against, and penalties for, damaging religious property or obstructing any person's free exercise of religious beliefs applicable where the offense is in, or affects, interstate commerce." One of the changes in the bill was the sentence increase for "defacing or destroying any religious real property because of race, color, or ethnic characteristics..." from 10 to 20 years. It also changed the statute of limitations from five years to seven years after the date the crime was committed. It reauthorizes the Hate Crimes Statistics Act.

=== Matthew Shepard and James Byrd, Jr. Hate Crimes Prevention Act (2009) ===
On October 28, 2009, President Obama signed the Matthew Shepard and James Byrd Jr. Hate Crimes Prevention Act, attached to the National Defense Authorization Act for Fiscal Year 2010, which expanded existing United States federal hate crime law to apply to crimes motivated by a victim's actual or perceived gender, sexual orientation, gender identity, or disability, and dropped the prerequisite that the victim be engaging in a federally protected activity.

=== Emmett Till Antilynching Act (2022) ===
On March 29, 2022, President Joe Biden signed the Emmett Till Antilynching Act, which extended the existing federal hate crime law (18 U.S. Code § 245 and § 249) by criminalizing collaborators that helped plan violent acts against victims, when the violence is based on a protected characteristic of the victim. In the case where, for instance, a mob of ten people plan an attack on an African American victim because of the victim's race, and two of the ten kill or seriously injure the victim, the Emmett Till Act extends culpability to the other eight conspirators. The Emmett Till Act, unlike some other conspiracy-based crimes, requires that the attack be carried out – mere planning without subsequent injury or death is not a crime under the Act. Spectators in a mob who watch the violence, but did not participate in the planning, are not culpable under the Emmett Till Act.

== State and district ==
Forty-seven states and the District of Columbia have statutes criminalizing various types of bias-motivated violence or intimidation (the exceptions being Arkansas, South Carolina, and Wyoming). Georgia, whose hate crime statute was struck down by the Georgia Supreme Court in 2004, passed a new hate crime law in June 2020. Each of these statutes covers bias on the basis of race, religion, and ethnicity; 34 cover disability; 34 of them cover sexual orientation; 30 cover gender; 24 cover transgender/gender-identity; 14 cover age; 6 cover political affiliation. and 3 along with Washington, D.C. cover homelessness.

Thirty-four states and the District of Columbia have statutes creating a civil cause of action, in addition to the criminal penalty, for similar acts.

Thirty states and the District of Columbia have statutes requiring the state to collect hate crime statistics; 20 of these cover sexual orientation.

State	Classes covered	Source
Alabama	Race, color, religion, national origin, ethnicity, physical and mental disabilities	
Alaska	Race, sex, color, creed, physical or mental disability, ancestry, and national origin	
Arizona	Race, color, religion, national origin, sexual orientation, gender, and disability	
California	Disability, gender ^{1}, nationality, race or ethnicity, religion, sexual orientation, and "association with a person or group" of one of the other classes	
Colorado	Race, color, ancestry, religion, national origin, physical or mental disability, gender identity, and sexual orientation	
Connecticut	Race, religion, ethnicity, disability, sex, sexual orientation, and gender identity or expression	
Delaware	Race, religion, color, disability, sexual orientation, gender identity, national origin, and ancestry	
District of Columbia	Race, color, religion, national origin, sex, age, marital status, personal appearance, sexual orientation, gender identity or expression, family responsibility, homelessness, physical disability, matriculation, and political affiliation of a victim	
Florida	Race, religion, ethnicity, color, ancestry, sexual orientation, and national origin	
Georgia	Race, color, religion, sex, gender ^{1}, disability, sexual orientation, national origin, or ethnicity	
Hawaii	Race, religion, disability, ethnicity, national origin, gender identity or expression, and sexual orientation	
Idaho	Race, color, ancestry, religion, and national origin	
Illinois	Race, color, creed, religion, ancestry, gender ^{1}, sexual orientation, physical or mental disability, and national origin of another individual or group of individuals	
Indiana	Color, creed, disability, national origin, race, religion, and sexual orientation	
Iowa	Race, color, religion, ancestry, national origin, political affiliation, sex, sexual orientation, age, disability, and "the person's association with a person" of one of the other classes	
Kansas	Race, color, religion, ethnicity, national origin, and sexual orientation	
Kentucky	Race, color, religion, sexual orientation, national origin, and employment as a law enforcement officer, firefighter, or emergency service personnel	
Louisiana	Race, age, gender, religion, color, creed, disability, sexual orientation, national origin, ancestry, membership or service in, or employment with, an organization, and employment as a law enforcement officer, firefighter, or emergency medical services personnel	
Maine	Race, color, religion, sex, ancestry, national origin, physical or mental disability, sexual orientation or gender identity	
Maryland	Race, color, religious beliefs, sexual orientation, gender ^{1}, disability, national origin, and homelessness	
Massachusetts	Race, religion, ethnicity, disability, gender, gender identity, and sexual orientation	
Michigan	Race, color, religion, sex, sexual orientation, gender identity or expression, physical or mental disability, age, ethnicity, or national origin	
Minnesota	Race, color, religion, sex ^{1}, sexual orientation, disability, age, and national origin	
Mississippi	Race, color, ancestry, ethnicity, religion, national origin, gender, and employment as a law enforcement officer, firefighter or emergency medical technician	
Missouri	Race, color, religion, national origin, sex, sexual orientation ^{1}, and disability	
Montana	Race, creed, religion, color, and national origin	
Nebraska	Race, color, religion, ancestry, national origin, gender, sexual orientation, age, and disability	
Nevada	Race, color, religion, national origin, physical or mental disability, sexual orientation, and gender identity	
New Hampshire	Religion, race, creed, sexual orientation, national origin, sex, and gender identity	
New Jersey	Race, color, religion, gender, disability, sexual orientation, gender identity or expression, national origin, and ethnicity	
New Mexico	Race, religion, color, national origin, ancestry, age, disability, gender, sexual orientation and gender identity	
New York	Race, color, national origin, ancestry, gender, gender identity, religion, religious practice, age, disability, and sexual orientation	
North Carolina	Race, color, religion, nationality, and country of origin	
North Dakota	Sex, race, color, religion, and national origin (applies only to discrimination in public places)	
Ohio	Race, ethnic background, and religion	
Oklahoma	Race, color, religion, ancestry, national origin, and disability	
Oregon	Race, color, religion, gender identity, sexual orientation, disability, and national origin	
Pennsylvania	Race, color, religion, and national origin	
Rhode Island	Disability, religion, color, race, national origin or ancestry, sexual orientation, and gender ^{1}	
South Dakota	Race, ethnicity, religion, ancestry, or national origin	
Tennessee	Race, religion, color, disability, sexual orientation, national origin, ancestry, and gender ^{1}	
Texas	Race, color, disability, religion, national origin or ancestry, age, gender, sexual preference, and by status as a peace officer or judge	
Utah	age, ancestry, disability, ethnicity, familial status, gender identity, homelessness, marital status, matriculation, national origin, political expression, race, religion, sex, sexual orientation, military service, status as an emergency responder, law enforcement officer, correctional officer, special function officer, or any other peace officer.	
Vermont	Race, color, religion, national origin, sex, ancestry, age, service in the U.S. Armed Forces, disability, sexual orientation, and gender identity	
Virginia	Race, religion, national origin, disability, sexual orientation, gender, and gender identity	
Washington	Race, color, religion, ancestry, national origin, gender, sexual orientation, disability, and gender identity	
West Virginia	Race, color, religion, ancestry, national origin, political affiliation, and sex	
Wisconsin	Race, religion, color, disability, sexual orientation, national origin, and ancestry	

Notes:

- ^{1} Gender identity covered

=== Sexual orientation and gender identity ===
US state hate crime laws as they pertain to sexual orientation and gender identity. Sexual orientation and gender identity recognized in state hate crimes law Sexual orientation recognized in state hate crimes law Sexual orientation recognized for data collection about hate crimes State hate crimes law noninclusive

1983
No LGBT hate crime statute at the state level
1984
California: Sexual orientation covered in hate crime statute
1987
Connecticut: Sexual orientation covered in hate crime statute
1988
Wisconsin: Sexual orientation covered in hate crime statute
1989
Minnesota: Sexual orientation covered in hate crime statute
Nevada: Sexual orientation covered in hate crime statute
Oregon: Sexual orientation covered in hate crime statute
1990
District of Columbia: Sexual orientation and gender identity covered in hate crime statute
New Jersey: Sexual orientation covered in hate crime statute
Vermont: Sexual orientation covered in hate crime statute
1991
Florida: Sexual orientation covered in hate crime statute
Illinois: Sexual orientation covered in hate crime statute
New Hampshire: Sexual orientation covered in hate crime statute
1992
Iowa: Sexual orientation covered in hate crime statute
Michigan: Sexual orientation included in hate crime data collection only
1993
Maine: Sexual orientation covered in hate crime statute
Minnesota: Gender identity covered in hate crime statute
Texas: Sexual orientation covered in hate crime statute
Washington: Sexual orientation covered in hate crime statute
1996
Massachusetts: Sexual orientation covered in hate crime statute
1997
Delaware: Sexual orientation covered in hate crime statute
Louisiana: Sexual orientation covered in hate crime statute
Nebraska: Sexual orientation covered in hate crime statute
1998
California: Gender identity covered in hate crime statute
Rhode Island: Sexual orientation covered in hate crime statute
1999
Missouri: Sexual orientation and gender identity covered in hate crime statute
Vermont: Gender identity covered in hate crime statute
2000
Georgia: Sexual orientation and gender identity covered in hate crime statute
Indiana: Sexual orientation included in hate crime data collection only
Kentucky: Sexual orientation covered in hate crime statute
New York: Sexual orientation covered in hate crime statute
Tennessee: Sexual orientation covered in hate crime statute
2002
Kansas: Sexual orientation covered in hate crime statute
Pennsylvania: Sexual orientation and gender identity covered in hate crime statute
Puerto Rico: Sexual orientation and gender identity covered in hate crime statute
2003
Arizona: Sexual orientation covered in hate crime statute
Hawaii: Sexual orientation and gender identity covered in hate crime statute
New Mexico: Sexual orientation and gender identity covered in hate crime statute
2004
Connecticut: Gender identity covered in hate crime statute
Georgia: Sexual orientation and gender identity no longer explicitly listed as protected class in hate crime statute by the Supreme Court of Georgia (U.S. state)
2005
Colorado: Sexual orientation and gender identity covered in hate crime statute
Maryland: Sexual orientation and gender identity covered in hate crime statute
2008
New Jersey: Gender identity covered in hate crime statute
Oregon: Gender identity covered in hate crime statute
Pennsylvania: Sexual orientation and gender identity no longer explicitly listed as protected class in hate crime statute by the Supreme Court of Pennsylvania
2012
Massachusetts: Gender identity covered in hate crime statute
Rhode Island: Gender identity covered in hate crime statute
2013
Delaware: Gender identity covered in hate crime statute
Nevada: Gender identity covered in hate crime statute
2014
United States Virgin Islands: Sexual orientation and gender identity covered in hate crime statute
2016
Illinois: Gender identity covered in hate crime statute
2019
Tennessee: Gender Identity covered in hate crime statute
Indiana: Sexual orientation covered in hate crime statute
Utah: Sexual orientation and gender identity covered in hate crime statute
Maine: Sexual orientation and gender identity covered in hate crime statute
New Hampshire: Gender identity covered in hate crime statute
Washington State: Gender identity covered in hate crime statute
New York State: Gender identity covered in hate crime statute
2020
Georgia: Sexual orientation and gender identity covered in hate crime statute
Virginia: Sexual orientation and gender identity covered in hate crime statute
2024
Michigan: Sexual orientation and gender identity covered in hate crime statute

=== Police and firefighters ===
On May 26, 2016, Louisiana was the first state to add police officers and firefighters to their state hate crime statute, when Governor John Bel Edwards signed an amendment from the legislature into law. This amendment was added, in part, as a response to the Black Lives Matter movement, which seeks to end police brutality against black people, with some advocates of the amendment using the slogan "Blue Lives Matter". Since the inception of Black Lives Matter, critics have found some of the movement's rhetoric anti-police, with the author of the amendment, Lance Harris, stating some "were employing a deliberate campaign to terrorize our officers". Despite the killing of a Texas sheriff in 2015 and the killings of two NYPD officers in the previous year, in response to the death of Eric Garner and the shooting of Michael Brown, there was little to no data suggesting hate crimes against law enforcement were a common problem when the bill was passed. A little less than two months after the amendment was passed, Baton Rouge was in the national spotlight after the Baton Rouge Police killing of Alton Sterling by two white police officers. This sparked protests in Baton Rouge, resulting in hundreds of arrests and increased racial tension nationally. In the week during those protests, five police officers were killed in Dallas, and the week after the protests, four more officers were killed in Baton Rouge. Both perpetrators were killed and the motives behind both shootings were responses to the recent killings of Black men by police officers.

In 2017, Kentucky became the second state making it a hate crime to attack police officers or emergency responders. This was part of a trend in "blue lives matter" legislation, encouraged by The Heritage Foundation and ideologues such as Edwin Meese and Bernard Kerik. That same year, Mississippi expanded its hate crime law to cover law enforcement officers, firefighters, and emergency workers. In 2019, Utah added status as a police officer or emergency responder to the list of protected classes. In 2020, Georgia enacted a new law creating the crime of bias-motivated intimidation, applying to attacks on police officers, firefighters, or emergency medical technicians.

== Data collection statutes ==
=== Hate Crime Statistics Act of 1990 ===
The Hate Crime Statistics Act of 1990 28 U.S.C. § 534, requires the Attorney General to collect data on crimes committed because of the victim's race, religion, disability, sexual orientation, or ethnicity. The bill was signed into law in 1990 by George H. W. Bush and was the first federal statute to "recognize and name gay, lesbian and bisexual people." Since 1992, the Department of Justice and the FBI have jointly published an annual report on hate crime statistics.

=== Violent Crime Control and Law Enforcement Act of 1994 ===
In 1994, the Violent Crime Control and Law Enforcement Act expanded the scope of required FBI data to include hate crimes based on disability, and the FBI began collecting data on disability bias crimes on January 1, 1997. In 1996, Congress permanently reauthorized the Act.

=== Campus Hate Crimes Right to Know Act of 1997 ===
The Campus Hate Crimes Right to Know Act of 1997 enacted 20 U.S.C. § 1092(f)(1)(F)(ii), which requires campus security authorities to collect and report data on hate crimes committed on the basis of race, gender, religion, sexual orientation, ethnicity, or disability. This bill was brought to the forefront by Senator Robert Torricelli.

== Prevalence ==
After a slow decline, the number of hate crimes increased since the mid 2010s.

The DOJ and the FBI have gathered statistics on hate crimes reported to law enforcement since 1992 in accordance with the Hate Crime Statistics Act. The FBI's Criminal Justice Information Services Division has annually published these statistics as part of its Uniform Crime Reporting program. According to these reports, of the over 113,000 hate crimes since 1991, 55% were motivated by racial bias, 17% by religious bias, 14% sexual orientation bias, 14% ethnicity bias, and 1% disability bias. David Ray Hate Crimes Prevention Act

Please note that the figures in the table below do not contain data from all reporting agencies every year. 2004 figures covered a population of 254,193,439, 2014 covered 297,926,030.

Victims per Year by Bias Motivation Department of Justice / FBI Hate Crimes Statistics
Bias Motive	1995	1996	1997	1998	1999	2000	2001	2002	2003	2004	2005	2006	2007	2008	2009	2010	2011	2012	2013	2014	2015	2016	2017	2018
Race	6,438	6,994	6,084	5,514	5,485	5,397	5,545	4,580	4,754	5,119	4,895	5,020	4,956	4,934	4,057	3,949	3,645	3,467	3,563	3,227				
Race/Ethnicity/Ancestry																					4,216	4,426	5,060	5,155
Religion	1,617	1,535	1,586	1,720	1,686	1,699	2,118	1,659	1,489	1,586	1,405	1,750	1,628	1,732	1,575	1,552	1,480	1,340	1,223	1,140	1,402	1,584	1,749	1,617
Sexual Orientation	1,347	1,281	1,401	1,488	1,558	1,558	1,664	1,513	1,479	1,482	1,213	1,472	1,512	1,706	1,482	1,528	1,572	1,376	1,461	1,248	1,263	1,255	1,338	1,445
Ethnicity/National Origin	1,044	1,207	1,132	956	1,040	1,216	2,634	1,409	1,326	1,254	1,228	1,305	1,347	1,226	1,109	1,122	939	866	821	821				
Disability	unknown	unknown	12	27	23	36	37	50	43	73	54	95	84	85	99	48	61	102	99	96	88	77	160	179
Gender	unknown	unknown	unknown	unknown	unknown	unknown	unknown	unknown	unknown	unknown	unknown	unknown	unknown	unknown	unknown	unknown	unknown	unknown	30	40	30	36	54	61
Gender Identity	unknown	unknown	unknown	unknown	unknown	unknown	unknown	unknown	unknown	unknown	unknown	unknown	unknown	unknown	unknown	unknown	unknown	unknown	33	109	122	131	132	189
Single-Bias	10,446	11,017	10,215	9705	9,792	9,906	11,998	9,211	9,091	9,514	8,795	9,642	9,527	9,683	8,322	8,199	7,697	7,151	7,230	6,681	7,121	7,509	8,493	8,646
Multiple-Bias	23	22	40	17	10	18	22	11	9	14	9	10	8	8	14	9	16	13	12	46	52	106	335	173
Total	10,469	11,039	10,255	9,722	9,802	9,924	12,020	9,222	9,100	9,528	8,804	9,652	9,535	9,691	8,336	8,208	7,713	7,164	7,242	6,727	7,173	7,615	8,828	8,819

Notes: The term victim may refer to a person, business, institution, or society as a whole. Though the FBI has collected UCR data since 1992, reports from 1992-1994 are not available on the FBI website. Single-bias victim totals have been calculated for 1995-1998. Race and Ethnicity/National origin were merged starting in 2015.

2008 Hate Crimes vs. 2008 Crimes per offense type Department of Justice / FBI crimes statistics
Offense type	Hate Crimes	All US Crimes
Murder and non-negligent manslaughter	7	16,272
Forcible rape	11	89,000
Robbery	145	441,855
Aggravated assault	1,025	834,885
Burglary	158	2,222,196
Larceny-theft	224	6,588,873
Motor vehicle theft	26	956,846

=== Protection of homeless people ===
Florida, Maine, Maryland, and Washington, D.C., have hate crime laws that protect homeless individuals.

A 2007 study found that the number of violent crimes against the homeless is increasing. The rate of such documented crimes in 2005 was 30% higher than of those in 1999. 75% of all perpetrators are under the age of 25. Studies and surveys indicate that homeless people have a much higher criminal victimization rate than the non-homeless, but that most incidents never get reported to authorities.

In recent years, largely due to the efforts of the National Coalition for the Homeless (NCH) and academic researchers, the problem of violence against the homeless has gained national attention. The NCH called deliberate attacks against the homeless hate crimes in their report Hate, Violence, and Death on Mainstreet USA (they retain the definition of the American Congress).

The Center for the Study of Hate & Extremism (CSHE) at California State University, San Bernardino in conjunction with the NCH found that in the years 1999-2005, there were 169 fatal attacks on homeless individuals, whilst there were 82 homicides of all the other traditional hate crime homicide categories such as race and religion, combined. The CSHE contends that negative and degrading portrayals of the homeless contribute to a climate where violence takes place.

== Debate ==
Penalty-enhancement hate crime laws are traditionally justified on the grounds that, in Chief Justice Rehnquist's words, "this conduct is thought to inflict greater individual and societal harm.... bias-motivated crimes are more likely to provoke retaliatory crimes, inflict distinct emotional harms on their victims, and incite community unrest."

=== Crimes against white people ===
There is disagreement about whether crimes against white people should receive the same treatment as other racial groups. The FBI listed 775 victims of anti-white hate crimes in 2019, more than victims of anti-Asian or anti-Arab hate crimes but less than victims of anti-black hate crimes. Between 2008 and 2012, anti-white hate crimes were the 3rd most common form of hate crimes, behind anti-black and anti-LGBTQ+ hate crimes (see detailed Hate crime#Victims in the United States).

In a 2001 report, Hate crimes on campus: the problem and efforts to confront it, by Stephen Wessler and Margaret Moss of the Center for the Prevention of Hate Violence at the University of Southern Maine, the authors note that "although there are fewer hate crimes directed against Caucasians than against other groups, they do occur and are prosecuted." The case in which the Supreme Court upheld hate crimes legislation against First Amendment attack, Wisconsin v. Mitchell, 508 U.S. 476 (1993), involved a white victim. Hate crime statistics published in 2002, gathered by the FBI under the auspices of the Hate Crime Statistics Act of 1990, documented over 7,000 hate crime incidents, in roughly one-fifth of which the victims were white people. However, these statistics have caused dispute. The FBI's hate crimes statistics for 1993, which similarly reported 20% of all hate crimes to be committed against white people, prompted Jill Tregor, executive director of Intergroup Clearinghouse, to decry it as "an abuse of what the hate crime laws were intended to cover", stating that the white victims of these crimes were employing hate crime laws as a means to further penalize minorities.

James B. Jacobs and Kimberly Potter note that white people, including those who may be sympathetic to the plight of those who are victims of hate crimes by white perpetrators, bristle at the notion that hate crimes against whites are somehow inferior to, and less worthy than, hate crimes against other groups. They observe that while, as stated by Altschiller, no hate crime law makes any such distinction, the proposition has been argued by "a number of writers in prominent publications", who have advocated the removal of hate crimes against whites from the category of hate crime, on the grounds that hate crime laws, in their view, are intended to be affirmative action for "protected groups". Jacobs and Potter firmly assert that such a move is "fraught with potential for social conflict and constitutional concerns."

== See also ==
- Civil Rights Act of 1964
- Civil Rights Act of 1968
- Crime in the United States
- Discrimination in the United States
- History of civil rights in the United States
- Human rights in the United States
- Local Law Enforcement Hate Crimes Prevention Act of 2007
- Political violence in the United States
- Terrorism in the United States
  - Domestic terrorism in the United States
