= Sagamihara stabbings =

2016 hate crime in Japan

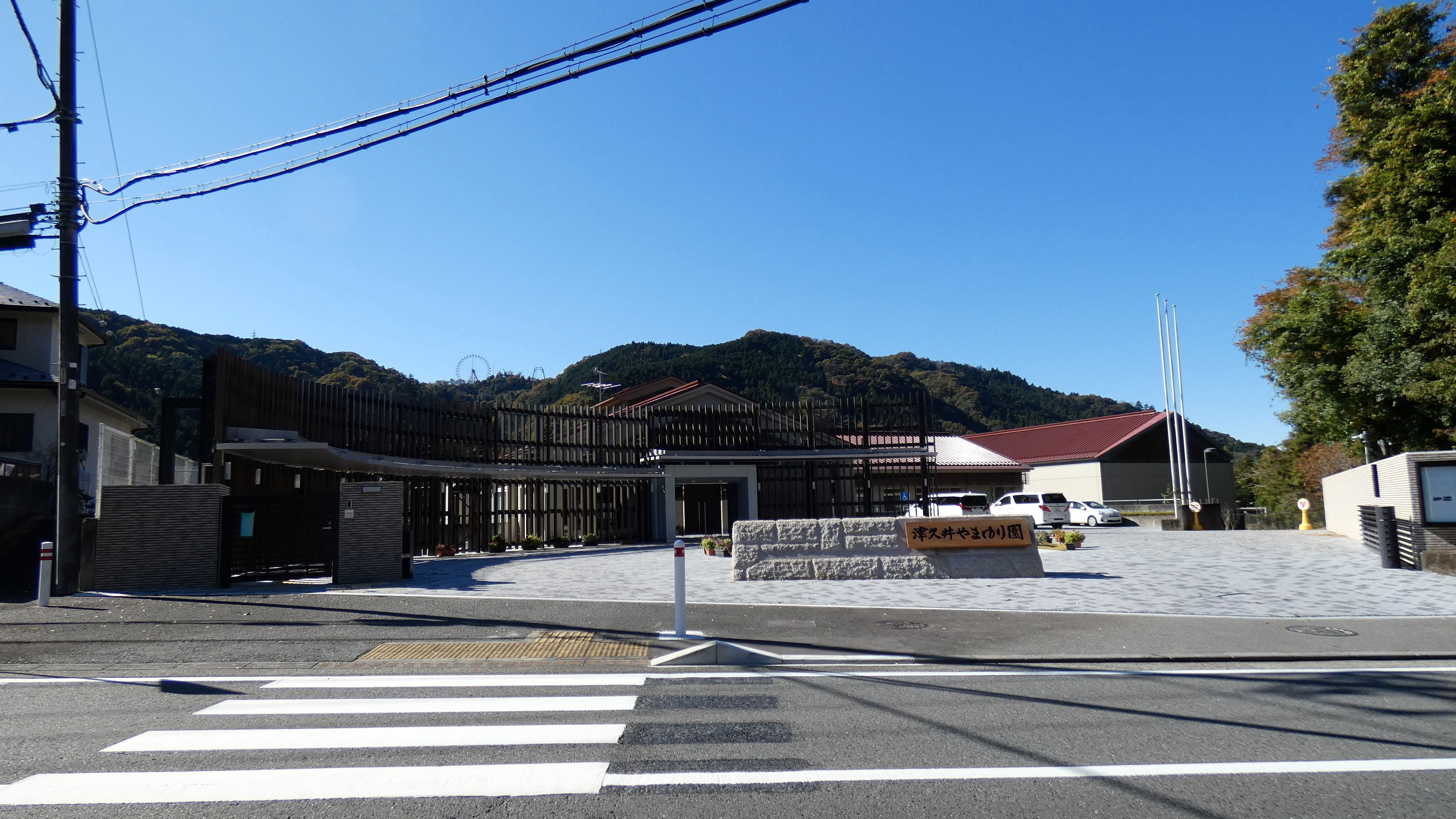
- Tsukui Yamayuri En, the location of the attack photographed in November 2021
- Location: 35°36′49″N 139°12′47″E; Midori Ward, Sagamihara, Kanagawa Prefecture, Japan
- Date: 26 July 2016; 01:43am – 02:48am (UTC+09:00)
- Target: Disabled people
- Attack type: Mass stabbing; mass murder; disability hate crime
- Weapons: Yanagi-ba knives, hammer
- Deaths: 19
- Injuries: 26 (13 severe)
- Perpetrator: Satoshi Uematsu (植松 聖)
- Motive: Ableism
- Verdict: Death
- Convictions: Murder (19 counts); Attempted murder Unlawful entry Illegal confinement

The Sagamihara stabbings were committed on 26 July 2016 in Midori Ward, Sagamihara, Kanagawa, Japan. Nineteen people were killed and twenty-six others were injured, thirteen severely, at a care home for disabled people. The crimes were committed by a 26-year-old man, identified as Satoshi Uematsu (植松 聖, Uematsu Satoshi), a former employee of the care facility. Uematsu surrendered at a nearby police station with a bag of knives and was arrested.

Justin McCurry of The Guardian described the attack as one of the worst crimes committed on Japanese soil in modern history. Uematsu was sentenced to death on 16 March 2020, after the prosecution sought the maximum penalty for murder in his trial; as of July 2022, he was on death row awaiting execution. It was the deadliest mass stabbing in Japan in decades.

== Location ==
Location of Tsukui Yamayuri En within Kanagawa Prefecture

Tsukui Lily Garden (津久井やまゆり園, Tsukui Yamayuri En) is a residential care center run by Kanagawa Kyodokai (社会福祉法人かながわ共同会, Shakai Fukushi Hōjin Kanagawa Kyōdōkai), a social welfare organization. Established by the local government, the facility was built in a 30,890 square metres (7.63 acres) area of woodland on the bank of the Sagami River. As of April 2016, the facility housed 149 residents between the ages of 19 and 75, all of whom had an intellectual disability but many with various physical disabilities as well. Some were capable of engaging in physical activities outdoors, while others were bedridden. The facility was located in a remote location about 2 kilometres (1.2 mi) from Sagamiko Station on the Chūō Main Line.

== Attack ==
About two hours before the incident, Satoshi Uematsu wore a suit and took a selfie in his car. He changed into a cap, dark pants, and a T-shirt. He drove to the care centre and parked his car at a nearby road at 01:37. He went to the back of his car to remove a bag containing five knives, a hammer, and cable ties from the trunk.

At about 01:43, Satoshi Uematsu used a hammer to break into the care centre through a glass window on the first floor, entering the Hana Home, one of the female wards. In the Hana Home, Uematsu kneeled down to remove several items from his bag. A female staff member noticed him and called out to him. Uematsu approached the woman, tied her up with cable ties, and forced her to walk with him to each residential room. In each room, he would ask her if the victim could speak. Uematsu would proceed to stab the victims who were incapable of speech. He would stab them in their chest and torsos as they slept while making derogatory statements about them. While stabbing one of the victims in the back, he accidentally broke off the tip of his blade. Uematsu replaced the knife with another. Uematsu tied the staff member's thumbs together and tied her to a handrail in the hallway. He gagged her with duct tape and stole her keys before moving on to the next home, the Niji Home. Uematsu killed five people and injured three, including the staff member, at the Hana Home.

At the Niji Home, Uematsu approached the female staff member on duty and ordered her to show her thumbs. The woman fought back and was injured in the struggle. Uematsu threatened her before tying her up with the cable ties. He walked her around to each room and asked her if the occupant could speak. The staff member lied to him to save more lives. However, Uematsu grew suspicious and decided to test each resident's reaction by telling them "good morning". If he believed they were incapable of speech, he stabbed them. While stabbing one of the victims in the home, he bent and broke his second knife due to the blade hitting the ribcage. Uematsu replaced the knife again and started aiming for the neck areas of his future victims. Uematsu tied up the staff member and moved on to the Tsubasa Home, a male ward. Uematsu killed five people and injured two, including the staff member, in the Niji Home.

At 02:17, Uematsu unlocked the door to the corridor connecting the Niji Home and the Tsubasa Home. As he approached the Tsubasa home, Uematsu encountered a male staff member who previously worked with him. Uematsu tied the staff member to a handrail of the hallway and taunted him. Uematsu then asked the man about the occupants of each room and also made a remark about looking for an aggressive occupant they both took care of. As Uematsu was stabbing people, the staff member took out his cell phone and tried texting his colleague to call the police. At some point, he dropped the cell phone. The staff member tried sending more messages by typing with his toes after kicking off his shoes and socks. The colleague receiving the messages eventually understood something was wrong and made the first call to police at 02:38. Eventually, Uematsu moved on to the Minori Home. He killed two people and injured two in the Tsubasa Home.

At the Minori Home, Uematsu tied a male staff member to a handrail and stabbed the occupants. He entered an office and used a computer to check the names of the employees who were on night shift to make sure none of them were strong enough to overpower him. Uematsu left the office and took the stairs to the second floor. Uematsu injured seven people in the Minori Home.

As Uematsu entered the second floor, he walked through the Subaru Home. He opened the door to the Ibuki Home and tied a male staff member to a railing. He also confiscated the employee's cell phone. Uematsu asked the employee about the occupants of each room before stabbing them. Uematsu walked back to the Subaru Home. In the Ibuki Home, he killed four people and injured eleven.

In the Subaru Home, Uematsu approached a male staff member working on a computer in the office. The staff member noticed Uematsu carrying a bloody knife and ran. Uematsu chased him to an empty room while telling him to stay calm and not to worry. The staff member held the door shut to prevent Uematsu from entering. Uematsu tried to open the door while telling the employee that "it's okay". He eventually gave up and started stabbing the occupants in the other rooms. The employee called the police at 02:45. In the Subaru Home, Uematsu killed three and wounded one. After stabbing the occupants, Uematsu left the care center through the main doors. He was recorded leaving the centre at 02:48.

Police were called to the care center by staff members at around 02:30, reporting a man with a knife breaking into the building. However, Uematsu left the premises before being apprehended; he was recorded re-entering his car at 02:50 in security camera footage. At 02:50, Uematsu posted a tweet on his Twitter account showing the selfie he took with the suit on. He added the caption: "世界が平和になりますように。 beautiful Japan!!!!!!" (May the world be at peace. Beautiful Japan!!!!!!")

Armed police entered the building at around 03:00 where they discovered the crime scene. Twenty-nine ambulances were sent to the facility. The suspect turned himself in at the Tsukui Police Station at 03:05 with the bag containing kitchen knives and other bloodstained sharp tools. A knife was reportedly found in his car outside the police station. Two knives were also recovered in the facility.

Uematsu killed ten women and nine men aged between 18 and 70. He also attacked 26 other people, 13 of which were severely injured. Most of the victims were stabbed in the neck.

== Perpetrator ==
Satoshi Uematsu
- 植松 聖
- Born: 20 January 1990 (age 36); Tamadaira, Hino, Tokyo, Tokyo Prefecture, Japan
- Education: Teikyo University
- Convictions: Murder (19 counts); Attempted murder (24 counts); Illegal confinement causing injury (2 counts); Illegal confinement (3 counts); Unlawful entry
- Penalty: Death

Details
- Imprisoned at: Tokyo Detention House

Satoshi Uematsu (植松 聖, Uematsu Satoshi) (born 20 January 1990) was born in the Tokyo suburb of Hino in a small section of town called Tamadaira. After his first birthday in January 1991, Uematsu and his parents moved to the city of Sagamihara. Growing up, Uematsu's father, born in Tokyo, worked as an elementary school art teacher and his mother as a manga artist. Uematsu had planned to follow in his father's footsteps later in life. He lived with his parents until he graduated from Teikyo University in March 2012, his parents moved to an apartment in Hachiōji, leaving Uematsu abandoned for unknown reasons.

Later in 2012, Uematsu began working at the Tsukui Yamayuri-en facility and remained employed for several years without issue. Officials of the facility later recounted a sudden shift in Uematsu's ideology. He began making abusive remarks towards the facility's severely disabled residents and, in February 2016, Uematsu abruptly resigned from his position.

In June 2015, Uematsu pivoted to tattoo artistry and began to work as an apprentice. Uematsu's former master later told Japanese media that he was angered by an incident in which Uematsu confessed his belief that "we should kill all people with disabilities". He also believed Uematsu to be under the influence of drugs while working, and thus expelled Uematsu from the position and severed ties. In a statement released by News Post Seven it was confirmed that Uematsu was a drug addict since his school days. Uematsu also supported the lifting of the Cannabis Control Law and believed that cannabis would "save the world". In January 2015, Uematsu posted a photo on social media showing an unfinished tattoo on his back featuring the faces of various yokai alongside marijuana leaves.

After the attack, neighbors expressed surprise that he had committed the murders. Many described Uematsu as being friendly and outgoing, however some noted that his personality had undergone a change at some point during his employment at the facility.

=== Letter and statements ===
On 18 February 2016, Uematsu attempted to hand-deliver a letter to Tadamori Ōshima, the Speaker of the House of Representatives of Japan, at Ōshima's home in Tokyo but was prevented from doing so by security. He returned the following day, and this time left the letter with the security guards. Uematsu's letter appealed for the legalization of ending the lives of those with multiple disabilities in cases where it was requested by their guardians, and asked for Ōshima's assistance in delivering his message to Japanese Prime Minister Shinzō Abe. In it, he wrote, "I envision a world where a person with multiple disabilities can be euthanised, with an agreement from the guardians, when it is difficult for the person to carry out household and social activities." He also wrote that the killings of disabled people would be "for the sake of Japan and world peace" as well as to benefit the global economy and prevent World War III.

After signing his name, the letter proceeded to detail an offer to target two facilities in Atsugi housing disabled people (possibly a reference to the two residential buildings in which he later committed the crime), and went on to appeal for certain conditions in exchange for committing the act. In the first half of the message, Uematsu said he could kill 460 people; however, in the second half, the number he gave was 260. He added that staff would be tied up to keep them from interfering but that they would not be harmed, the act would be swift, and that afterwards he would turn himself in. At the end of the latter half of the letter, he signed his name again, this time with his address, telephone number, and the name of his employer.

Later that month, after his letter was brought to the attention of Sagamihara's authorities, Uematsu was arrested, detained, questioned, and then involuntarily committed to a psychiatric hospital for two weeks. He was sent to Kitasato University East Hospital in Sagamihara, but was released on 2 March after doctors deemed that he was not a threat. In his letter and in statements made after turning himself in, Uematsu said that he was "saving from unhappiness" both the severely disabled and those who he believed were burdened with maintaining their lives.

=== Legal proceedings ===
On 20 February 2017, Uematsu was found mentally competent to stand trial. On 24 February 2019, Uematsu was charged with 19 counts of murder, 24 counts of attempted murder, two counts of illegal confinement causing injury, three counts of illegal confinement, one count of unlawful entry, and one count of violating the Firearm and Sword Possession Control Law.

Uematsu's defense team said they planned to argue that he was mentally incompetent at the time of the crime, due to the effects of marijuana. On 23 December 2019, Uematsu said he would admit to the crime during the trial, saying that denying the charges against him "would be quibbling and make the trial too complex".

On 8 January 2020, Uematsu pleaded not guilty to the stabbings. On 17 February 2020, the prosecution announced that the death penalty was officially sought against Uematsu saying the rampage was "inhumane" and left "no room for leniency." On 16 March, Uematsu was sentenced to death by the Yokohama District Court, having previously said he would not challenge any verdict or sentence. On 30 March, Uematsu's death sentence was finalized as he withdrew automatic appeal to the upper courts.

While incarcerating at the Tokyo Detention House, in April 2022, two years after his sentencing, Uematsu appealed for a retrial for his case. In April 2023, his request was dismissed.

== Reactions ==
Yoshihide Suga, the Japanese Chief Cabinet Secretary at the time, acknowledged that the attack was "a very heart-wrenching and shocking incident in which many innocent people became victims". He also said that the Ministry of Health, Labour, and Welfare would investigate ways to prevent a similar incident from occurring again.

A number of Japanese news outlets ran editorials calling the stabbings a hate crime. By September 2016, little information had been released about the victims of the attack.

The care home facility was demolished. Nearby structures where no one was attacked, such as the administration building and gymnasium, were left intact. On 13 September 2016, the governor of Kanagawa Prefecture, Yūji Kuroiwa, said the facility would be rebuilt. The new facility of two buildings opened in July 2021.

== Legacy ==
The 26th of July is considered a significant date in disability history. In addition to being the date of the Sagamihara stabbings, 26 July 1990 saw the enactment of one of the world's first national legislation outlawing disability discrimination: the Americans with Disabilities Act.

One year after the stabbings, on 26 July 2017, a documentary was released entitled Nineteen Paper Cranes by filmmaker Michael Joseph McDonald. The film follows a deaf Japanese papermaker with Kabuki syndrome as she memorializes the nineteen victims of the Sagamihara stabbings.

== See also ==
- Capital punishment in Japan
- Ableism
- Aktion T4
- Life unworthy of life
- List of mass stabbings by death toll
