= Sexual abuse and intellectual disability =

Research published from 2000 to 2020 illustrates increased prevalence rates of sexual violence against people with intellectual disabilities, compared to the general population.^{:61} The World Health Organization (WHO) funded a study which concluded that 15% of the adult population worldwide in 2012 had a disability, putting them at increased risk of physical, sexual, and intimate partner violence. Of that 15%, 6.1% had intellectual disability with 5.5% experiencing sexual violence. In another 2012 report, the WHO found that worldwide, children with intellectual disabilities experienced a 4.6 times greater risk of sexual violence than those without disability.

In the United States, the Bureau of Justice Statistics reported in the National Crime Victimization Survey the rate of sexual violence for those with an intellectual disability is five times higher than for those without any disability. Both men and women with intellectual disabilities experience sexual violence that includes rape, sexual coercion without physical force, and sexual experiences without physical contact. Perpetrators of sexual violence are not only strangers but can be caregivers, acquaintances, and intimate partners. The perpetrator of the assault often determines if the crime will be reported.

While people with intellectual disabilities experience sexual violence in many of the same ways as the general population,^{:73} those with intellectual disability may be more vulnerable to sexual violence because of their dependence on others for economic support, personal care, and support with tasks associated with daily living such as bathing and eating. They often encounter additional issues related to their disability and the environments in which they live. These additional issues can include questions around the ability to consent to sexual activities, differential treatment before the law and restricted access to proper support and recovery services. Societal attitudes and beliefs about the sexuality of those with intellectual disabilities and the validity or accuracy of their claims of abuse are additional risk factors. Finally, racial and ethnic discrimination with disability discrimination increase the risk of sexual violence.

== Prevalence and incidence ==
There are large differences between the prevalence and incidence estimates from independent sources of research as it relates to this topic. Results are often impacted by many factors such as:

- Differences in how sexual abuse is defined, and which experiences are counted as abuse for research purposes.
- Who is asked about the abuse: reported prevalence and incidence are lower if service managers, staff or case notes are consulted, and higher when people with intellectual disabilities are asked directly.
- Whether abuse rates for men and women are combined or calculated separately.
- Differences between the groups of people selected to take part in the research.

Morris (1999) reported that incidence data on sexual abuse of disabled children can be difficult to compile because:

- Parties reporting the incident may not agree on the impairment of the disabled child.
- Information may not be recorded consistently.
- Some children with mild or moderate intellectual disabilities may not be registered with the services that usually record abuse incidents.

The highest rate of occurrence of abuse happens within the place of residence of the persons with intellectual disabilities. Other areas of frequency where abuse occurs were at the perpetrator's home and in other public places, such as public toilets.

Understanding race and ethnicity factors in sexual assault incidence among those with an intellectual disability are vital for addressing differences between white and minority populations in victimization and intervention. As in other health issues, intellectually disabled people from historically disadvantaged racial and ethnic groups face health disparity with poorer health outcomes than white populations with a disability. However, race and ethnicity are often not reported in study samples looking specifically at sexual violence and intellectual disability.

=== United States ===
In 2002, David Sorensen wrote that Americans with intellectual disabilities were four to ten times more likely to have acts of violence committed against them.

In 1996 Dick Sobsey, associate director of the JP Das Developmental Disabilities Centre and Director of the John Dossetor Health Ethics Centre at the University of Alberta, concluded that 80% of 162 people with developmental and substantial disabilities who had been sexually assaulted had been sexually assaulted more than once. Sobsey estimated that between 15,000 and 19,000 individuals with intellectual disabilities experience rape each year.

According to 1995 guidance from the US Department of Justice, more than 90% of Americans with intellectual disabilities experienced some form of sexual abuse at some time in their lives; 49% experienced 10 or more abusive incidents.

In his 1994 book Violence and abuse in the lives of people with disabilities: the end of silent acceptance?, Sobsey wrote that 68% of girls with intellectual disabilities and 30% of boys with intellectual disabilities will be sexually abused before their 18th birthday.

Sullivan and Knutson concluded in 2000 that children with intellectual disabilities were at slightly greater risk of sexual abuse than disabled children in general, who in turn were at 3.14 times greater risk of experiencing sexual abuse than non-disabled children.

In 2007, Americans with intellectual disabilities were victims of approximately 47,000 rapes and sexual assaults. Statistical data from 2009 to 2014 drawn from the Bureau of Justice Statistics, the rate of serious violent crime as in rape or sexual assault for persons with intellectual disabilities was more than three times the rate for persons without intellectual disabilities including a correlation of 40% of the time the victim was being taken care of by the person who sexually assaulted them.

A 2010 study concluded that the largest group of identified perpetrators of sexual abuse is developmental disability service providers or caregivers. 87% of a sample from 874 surveys of individuals with intellectual disabilities reported that they had been sexually abused, and 67% had experienced vaginal or anal penetration. The study also concluded that these service providers lacked basic knowledge about abuse, perpetrator characteristics, and facts about potential victims.

In some cases, people with developmental disability are unable to disclose sexual abuse due to the physical or emotional limitations imposed by their disability, leading to the caregivers taking advantage of their intellectual disabilities.

=== Britain ===
A study by McCarthy and Thompson in 1997 found a prevalence rate of 25% for men and 61% for women. A survey by Brown et al. of senior managers in 1992 found an incidence rate of 0.5 per thousand people with intellectual disabilities each year.

=== The Republic of Ireland ===
A study by Dunne and Power in 1990 found an incidence rate of 2.88 per thousand people with intellectual disabilities per year.

=== Spain ===
A study by Gil-Llario, Morell-Mengual, Ballester-Arnal and Díaz-Rodríguez in 2017 found a prevalence rate of 2.8% for men and 9.4% for women. Among the women who were abused, only 52.9% trusted someone enough to tell them about what had happened. Of these, 28.6% preferred to tell a close relative, 57.1% told an educator and 14.3% talked to a friend about it. Of the men, 80% decided to talk about their experience of abuse. Half of them (50%) told their father or mother, 25% talked to an educator and 25% discussed the matter with a close relative.

Another Spanish study indicates that the prevalence of sexual abuse is 6.10% when it is self‐reported (9.4% in women and 2.8% in men) and 28.6% when it is reported by professionals (27.8% in women and 29.4% in men).

== Risk factors ==
A number of factors put people with intellectual disabilities at an increased risk of sexual violence. Medical models of disability emphasize risks connected with the person's disability, while social models of disability focus on risks caused by the socially-created environment of the intellectually disabled person. Not all factors will apply to all people with intellectual disabilities, and some are not exclusive to people with intellectual disabilities.

- Lack of understanding.
- Lack of social awareness and training that would help identify and anticipate abusive situations.
- Ingrained reliance on the caregiver authority figure.
- Long-term dependence on services and personal care.
- Emotional and social insecurities.
- Lack of capacity to consent to sexual activity.
- Lack of knowledge and training in sex education.
- Powerless position in society.
- Low self-esteem, contributing to powerlessness.
- Not realizing that sexual abuse can cause harm.
- Not being able to tell anyone about the abuse.
- Learned behaviour not to question caregivers or others in authority.
- Communication difficulties that hinder reporting abuse.
- Fear of not being believed, leading to non-reporting of abuse.
- Feelings of guilt or shame that prevent reporting of abuse.
- Difficulty identifying an appropriate person to report the abuse to.
- Low risk of prosecution for perpetrators.
- Routine prescription of contraceptives to women with intellectual disabilities, leading to reduced risk of detection for perpetrators.

People with moderate to severe intellectual disabilities, and those with additional physical disabilities, form the majority of learning-disabled people experiencing sexual violence.

=== Detection of sexual abuse risk ===
Detection of Sexual Abuse Risk Screening Scale (DSARss) The DSARss is a brief screening measure designed to assess the risk of experiencing SA for people with ID. The scale consists of 19 items, which are grouped into four factors:

1. Acceptance of the abuse due to affection- The denial of the risk of SA by people in the victim's immediate environment.

- “My father takes care of me, so it is okay to have sexual relationships with him.”
- ”My teacher takes care of me, so it is okay to have sexual relationships with him.”
- “My schoolmates take care of me, so it is okay to have sexual relationships with them.”
- ”My uncle takes care of me, so it is okay to have sexual relationships with him.”

2. Denial of the risk associated with places- The perception of invulnerability to SA associated with places.

- “It is impossible to be sexually abused in the street.”
- “It is impossible to be sexually abused in my home.”
- “It is impossible to be sexually abused in a public place (e.g., school, day care centre . . .).”

3. Risk factors and self-protection skills- The presence of risk indicators associated with drug use or lack of parental supervision and mastery of coping skills.

- “I am more likely to be sexually abused if someone offers me alcohol insistently.”
- “I am less likely to be sexually abused if my parents know where and with whom I go out.”
- “I am more likely to be sexually abused if I am in a deserted area during the night.”
- ”If someone tries to abuse me, I must cry “Stop! Help!””
- “I should be suspicious of a stranger who offers me a gift.”
- ”If someone sexually abuses me, I should report it to the police.”
- ”If someone sexually abuses me, I should report it to my teacher.”
- “It is better not to say anything if someone touches my privates without my consent.”

4. Lack of awareness of intimacy rules- The person's knowledge about what constitutes a potential threat to personal space.

- “It is okay if someone I know touches my butt.”
- ”It is okay if I let that people show my privates.”
- “If I like someone, I can allow him or her to touch my privates.
- “If someone touches me when I do not want, I have to let him or her anyway.”

All items are dichotomous (true or false) and include an illustration exemplifying the content of the question in order to help people with ID understand the content of the item. The DSARss has a different version for men and women. The content of the items is equivalent in both versions but the exact wording for some items change . Reliability analysis of the DSARss found an internal consistency for the total scale of r = 0.52 and for the four factors it ranged between r = 0.50 and r = 0.70.

== Perpetrator profile ==
Research suggests that 97% to 99% of abusers are known and trusted by the victim who has the intellectual disability. According to Sobsey and Doe's 1991 analysis of 162 reports of sexual abuse against people with intellectual disabilities, the largest percentage of offenders (28%) were service providers (direct care staff members, personal care attendants, psychiatrists). In addition, 19% of sexual offenders were natural or stepfamily members, 15.2% were acquaintances (neighbors, family friends), 9.8% were informal paid service providers (babysitters), and 3.8% were dates. Further, 81.7% of the victims were women, and 90.8% of the offenders were men.

== Law ==
=== United States ===
Cases of sexual abuse are considered in many states to qualify as "sexual assault" under the law; sexual assault is often prosecuted through rape or sexual battery statutes. Cases of sexual assault are prosecuted differently according to individual state laws and statutes.

States often have statutes for the intellectually disabled people separate from the general sex offense statutes. Such separate statutes often hold the intellectually disabled person at a "higher standard" for consent than the non-intellectually-disabled person; that is, the legal standards used to prove sexual consent will be stricter for the intellectually disabled individual.

As Deborah W. Denno of the Fordham University School of Law explains:

Courts have applied vague, unworkable tests in determining a mentally retarded victim's capacity to consent; it would be unrealistic to suggest that a rigid, precisely defined standard could ever be effective in so amorphous an area as sexual relations.

==== Capacity to consent ====
Six tests are used as such a standard to assess the legal capacity of the intellectually disabled individual to consent to sexual conduct. These are the tests of "nature and consequences", "morality", "nature of the conduct", "totality of the circumstances", "evidence of mental disability", and "judgment". Forty-nine American states use one of these six tests in reviewing cases of sexual abuse, but Illinois uses two tests.

| Test name | Description | States using this test |
|---|---|---|
| Nature of the conduct | The individual must understand the sexual nature of any sexual conduct and the voluntary aspect of such activity, but does not have to understand the nature and consequences of such sexual activity, or the morality of the conduct. | California, Delaware, Florida, Kentucky, Louisiana, Maine, Montana, Nebraska, Nevada, New Hampshire, New Jersey, North Carolina, North Dakota, Ohio, Oregon, Rhode Island, South Carolina, Texas, Utah: 38% of the US. |
| Nature and consequences | Similar to the medical informed consent doctrine in which the patient must understand both the nature and consequences of a procedure; the individual must also understand the risks of behavior, including possible negative outcomes. | Alaska, Arizona, Arkansas, Indiana, Iowa, Kansas, New Mexico, Oklahoma, Pennsylvania, Tennessee, Vermont, Virginia, Wyoming: 26% of the US. |
| Morality | The individual must have a moral understanding of the sexual activity and also understand the nature and consequences of sexual conduct. | Alabama, Colorado, Hawaii, Idaho, Illinois (with Totality of circumstances test), New York, Washington: 14% of the US. |
| Totality of circumstances | All the facts surrounding the case are weighed up, to determine the cause of the incident. | Illinois (with Morality test). |
| Evidence of mental disability | A method, rather than a statute, which allows for the court to consider evidence of disability. | Connecticut, Maryland, Massachusetts, Michigan, Mississippi, Missouri, South Dakota, West Virginia, Wisconsin: 18% of the US. |
| Judgment | Ascertains whether the individual can exercise judgment regarding consent to sexual activity. | Georgia, Minnesota |

=== Australia ===
==== Special protection ====
Intellectually disabled people get special protection under Australian law. In the penal code, a person is defined as mentally defective if they have "a mental disease or defect which renders him or her incapable of appraising the nature of his or her conduct." The special protection granted to those with intellectual disabilities in these cases is akin to the statutory protection given to children. In cases of sexual abuse, actual consent is irrelevant, because the person is incapable of giving legal consent.

=== England and Wales ===
The Sexual Offences Act 2003 defines sexual offences in general, including those perpetrated against or by adults or children. The Act includes specific crimes against adults with intellectual disabilities or mental health conditions:

sexual abuse of vulnerable persons with a mental disorder. These include situations where:

- they are unable to refuse because of a lack of understanding,
- they are offered inducements, threatened or deceived, and
- there is a breach of a relationship of care, by a care worker;

== Reported crimes ==
In 2002 Daniel D. Sorensen, Chair of the Victims of Crime Committee, Criminal Justice Task Force for People with Developmental Disabilities estimated that less than 4.5% of crimes against people with intellectual disabilities in California were reported compared to the 44% of the general public who experience crimes. In the same year, the Seattle Rape Relief Project program for victims of sexual assault with intellectual disabilities concluded that there was under-reporting of sexual assaults of victims with intellectual disabilities that exceeded under-reporting with other populations. In 1990, several studies suggested 80–85% of criminal abuse of residents of institutions never reached the proper authorities. The studies concluded that 40% of those criminally abused and 40% of non-abusing staff of care facilities studied were reluctant to come forward with criminal abuse issues for fear of reprisals or retribution from administrators.

== Effects of sexual violence ==
Sexual violence harms people with intellectual disabilities like those without intellectual disability (ID). The harm is often worse when the violence occurs over a long period or if the individual has experienced multiple traumatic events throughout their lives. A lower developmental level can increase the risk of harm and if the perpetrator is known to the survivor. The following effects have been reported, but may not be experienced by all learning disabled survivors of sexual violence:

- Psychological and emotional damage, such as depression, guilt, self-blame and low self-esteem.
- Physical injury.
- Pregnancy.
- Sexually transmitted disease.
- Damage (possibly permanent) to relationships of trust with caregivers, friends and family.
- Disturbed, challenging, or otherwise changed behaviour, particularly for those who cannot communicate.
- Post-traumatic stress disorder (PTSD).

Those with intellectual disabilities face the same challenges reporting incidents of sexual assault as those without ID. Survivors of sexual assault experience fear of retaliation or of not being believed. They may lack knowledge of sex and so are unsure of what happened to them. Society continues to perpetuate the myth that the survivor is to blame for the crime committed upon their body. Additionally, individuals with intellectual disabilities can find it challenging to communicate when sexual abuse occurs or has occurred in the past due to impairments with understanding and expressing language. Barriers to communication and a lack of validated measures to assess for sexual assault in developmentally and intellectually disabled adults, makes it imperative for medical providers, family members and caregivers to recognize some of the behavioral changes that could indicate sexual abuse is occurring or has occurred. The following are behavioral changes that have been seen in some but not all victims of sexual abuse with ID:

- Sleep disturbances including nightmares without related traumatic content
- Decreased school performance
- Poor concentration
- Enuresis and Encopresis
- Aggression
- Social withdrawal
- Suicidal ideation
- Eating disturbances
- Self-injury
- Repetitive play in children and those with lower levels of intelligence
- Acting out the trauma
- Isolation

== Treatment ==
Treatment of sexual assault starts with awareness that those with disabilities, predominantly intellectual disabilities, are at higher risk and, therefore, more vulnerable to violent crime. Understanding that individuals with intellectual disabilities are at increased risk for sexual assault, health professionals can screen for sexual violence when treating clients. Screening for sexual assault improves health outcomes with timely intervention and treatment.

Individuals with intellectual disabilities who have experienced trauma such as sexual assault are at greater risk for more severe trauma-related distress, including PTSD. Effective treatments focus on teaching individuals to cope with the trauma and overcome fear, anxiety, isolation, and reduce the cumulative effects of reliving the event. Evidence-based recommendations for treating trauma-related distress and Post-traumatic stress disorder for adults and children with developmental and intellectual disabilities are interdisciplinary treatment approaches. Clinicians should be trained in sexuality, intellectual disability, and treating abuse. Pharmacological treatments are effective. Psychotherapy using cognitive behavioral therapy and eye movement desensitization have been useful in populations with intellectual disabilities. One intervention that was most effective at reducing trauma symptoms was establishing changes in a person's daily environment to avoid traumatic cues.

Screening and training of caregivers, clinicians, and care staff improve prevention. Sexual education and sexually appropriate behavior and assertiveness training can increase sexual abuse prevention.

Clinicians and caregivers can advocate and educate others on disability and sexual abuse prevention to improve outcomes for preventing and treating sexual assault for those with intellectual disabilities.

== See also ==
- Facilitated communication
- Disability abuse
- Sexuality and disability
- Sexual abuse
- Sexual assault
