= Mind Quiz =

2006 video game

- Developer: Sega
- Publishers: JP: Sega; WW: Ubisoft
- Producer: Rieko Kodama
- Platforms: Nintendo DS, PlayStation Portable
- Release: Nintendo DS: JP: September 14, 2006; NA: March 13, 2007; PAL: March 23, 2007; PlayStation Portable: NA: October 31, 2006; AU: November 16, 2006; EU: November 17, 2006
- Genre: Educational
- Mode: Single-player

Mind Quiz, also known as Mind Quiz: Exercise Your Brain or Mind Quiz: Your Brain Coach (Nounenrei: Nou Stress Kei Atama Scan in Japan), is a mental training game for the Nintendo DS and PlayStation Portable. It is similar to Nintendo's Brain Age: Train Your Brain in Minutes a Day! It involves playing different training exercises to measure and improve particular parts of the player's brain, such as one's brain age and its brain stress degree.

== Overview ==
The game offers over 40 training games, each being separated into four brain training categories:

1. Calculation — Tests the player's ability to apply mathematics skills.
2. Reflex — Displays problems that mostly require the player to rapidly press buttons.
3. Judgment — Examines how well the player can apply decision-making and thinking skills.
4. Memory — Tests the player's ability to memorize certain numbers, shapes, and the like.

== Grading system ==
Grades in Mind Quiz range from A+ to E, each being associated with a different level of performance.

A+	A	B+	B	C+	C	D+	D	E+	E
>95.0%	90–94.9%	85–89.9%	80–84.9%	70–79.9%	60–69.9%	50–59.9%	40–49.9%	30–39.9%	<29.9%

== Game modes ==
Game modes include

- Datafile: measures performance in each of the five areas
- Save/Delete: allows the player to save or delete his data
- Brain Age Test: tests brain age with four mini-examinations
- Training
- Challenge

=== Exams ===
Take any one of five different exams in all four Mind Quiz fields.

=== Galleries ===
View two different galleries: one containing animal pictures, and one containing Brain Trainer Awards.

=== Network ===
Accessible from the Main Menu, this function requires two PSP systems with the Mind Quiz: Exercise Your Brain UMD inside, and with the WLAN switch on. One player selects "Player Search" and is the host. The other player selects "Participate" and is the recipient. Once a connection is established, the players prepare and start competing. Each player is given a set number of questions. Whoever gets all questions first wins.

The phrase "Super Spastic" is highlighted in red

== Gameplay ==
After entering the Training Mode, the player is asked his first question. When the game is finished, a report card will show time, rate %, and letter grade, along with a comment from the teacher.

== UK recall ==
On June 29, 2007, Ubisoft, the game's publisher, voluntarily recalled the game in the UK upon complaints that the word spastic, which is a pejorative term for disabled people in British English, appeared when the player incorrectly answered certain questions. Ubisoft stated "As soon as we were made aware of the issue we stopped distribution of the product and are now working with retailers to pull the game off the market."

== Reception ==
Reception

Aggregate score
Aggregator	Score
GameRankings	DS: 51.2% PSP: 68%

Review scores
Publication	Score
GameSpot	4.9 out of 10
IGN	4.0 out of 10

The title received mixed reviews; garnering 51.20% on GameRankings. GameSpot gave the game 4.9/10 (Poor), stating that "Mind Quiz: Your Brain Coach is a shameless clone of Nintendo's brain-training DS game, Brain Age" and that "This game isn't good enough to serve as a game for Brain Age players who are looking for more of the same because it's too similar yet too shallow to entertain that crowd. If you fall into the group of people who haven't played Brain Age, you should go with that one rather than waste your time on a pretender like Mind Quiz."
