= Disability hate crime =

Prejudiced crime against disabled people

Disability hate crime is a hate crime which involves the use of violence against people with disabilities. This form of violence is not only violence in a physical sense, it also includes other hostile acts, such as the repeated blocking of disabled access and verbal abuse. These hate crimes are associated with prejudice against a disability, or a denial of equal rights for disabled people (as this is a form of prejudice). It is viewed politically as an extreme form of ableism, or disablism. This phenomenon can take many forms, from verbal abuse and intimidatory behaviour to vandalism, assault, or even murder. Although data are limited studies appear to show that verbal abuse and harassment are the most common. Disability hate crimes may take the form of one-off incidents, or may represent systematic abuse which continues over periods of weeks, months, or even years. Disabled parking places, wheelchair access areas and other facilities are frequently a locus for disability hate. Instead of seeing access areas as essential for equity, they are seen instead as 'special treatment', unjustifiable by status, and so a 'reason' for acting aggressively. Denial of access thus demonstrates a prejudice against equal rights for disabled people; such actions risk actual bodily harm as well as limiting personal freedom.

The people who commit disability hate crimes frequently justify their actions with narratives which are driven by socio-economic factors which can follow a typical pattern. For example, people commit these crimes because they view disabled people as: making 'inconvenient' or 'insolent' demands for physical barriers (e.g. parked cars, commercial signage) to be removed; 'falsely' portraying their disabilities to receive welfare support ("scroungers"); being undeserving of equal access / treatment; having lower status and therefore being "easy targets" for aggressive acts.

Another factor is ignorance of the very basic tenets of variable and/or invisible disabilities. People can fail to acknowledge the fact that seeing a risky action once is no indicator of whether the disabled person can do it safely, repeatedly, without extreme pain, without consequence or predictably at any other time. Low awareness of the medical need for ambulatory wheelchair use - such as fatigue collapse over medium distance; difficulties with prolonged standing as opposed to walking; balance or cardiac issues - can also be a factor.

A disability hate crime can occur in any situation and it can be committed against any individual. Incidents may occur between strangers who have never met, they may also occur between acquaintances, or they may occur within the family. The two key requirements for an act to be called a "disability hate crime" are the perception that in part or in whole, it is motivated by ableism, a prejudice against someone because he or she has a disability (denial of equal rights is a form of this prejudice); and second, the perception that the act is actually a crime, which includes repeated access blocking. Multiple hate incidents - which do not involve a criminal offence per se - can also constitute a disability hate crime if there are enough of them. This is because repeated harassment is a criminal offence.

== Recognition ==
Sir Ken Macdonald, QC, the then Director of Public Prosecutions for England and Wales, stated in a speech to the Bar Council in October 2008 that "I am on record as saying that it is my sense that disability hate crime is very widespread. I have said that it is my view that at the lower end of the spectrum, there is a vast amount not being picked up. I have also expressed the view that the more serious disability hate crimes are not always being prosecuted as they should be. This is a scar on the conscience of criminal justice. And all bodies and all institutions involved in the delivery of justice, including my own, share the responsibility."

== Legal status ==
In the United States, the Matthew Shepard and James Byrd Jr. Hate Crimes Prevention Act of 2009 expanded the 1969 United States federal hate-crime law to include crimes motivated by a victim's actual or perceived disability.

In 1994, when the U.S. Congress reauthorized the Hate Crimes Statistics Act, crimes based on disability were categorized as bias crimes. This sparked the Federal Bureau of Investigation (FBI) to begin keeping data that relates to all crimes based against persons, property, or society that entails someone with a disability. Once these crimes are recorded, they are then divided up into subcategories; therefore, disability status was measured out through either one's physical disability or their mental disability. The FBI did this in order to determine if the frequency of the crimes differed depending on one's disabled status (whether it was physical or mental).

The data they received indicated that the risk of a disabled individual being the victim of a hate crime was somewhat rare, but the risk of them being assaulted was far higher than any other marginalized group. However, there seemed to be a minute difference in terms of frequency between those who were physically disabled and those who were mentally disabled.

According to recent data, disability hate crime incidents are currently on the rise in the United States. There were over 150 recently reported hate crime offenses that stemmed from a bias of those with a disability just in the 2018 year. From the FBI's Uniform Crime Reporting Program, there were far fewer similar offenses in the year prior, demonstrating a stark increase as time has progressed. In total, the FBI reported over 7,000 hate crime incidents in general, which makes about 2.1 percent of the victims from those crimes specifically targeted because of their disability.

Out of the disability hate crimes that were logged and recorded, 110 of those were against people with mental disabilities, while the other 67 were those with physical disabilities. Studies have also shown that the chance of being physically or sexually assaulted when someone is disabled can be up to ten times greater than those who are non-disabled.

Regardless, there is a widely known assumption that the incidence of reporting crimes by someone with a disability is much less than that of other minority groups. Some suggest that this is the case because of the lack of access to the criminal justice system as well as possible retribution from caretakers or others. With that, individuals with disabilities may actually experience more hate crimes than those that have been reported.

In the UK, disability hate crime is regarded as an aggravating factor under section 146 of the Criminal Justice Act 2003, allowing a heavier tariff to be used in sentencing than the crime might draw without the hate elements. Section 146 states that the sentencing provisions apply if:

(a) that, at the time of committing the offence, or immediately before or after doing so, the offender demonstrated towards the victim of the offence hostility based on—

(i) the sexual orientation (or presumed sexual orientation) of the victim, or
(ii) a disability (or presumed disability) of the victim, or

(b) that the offence is motivated (wholly or partly)—

(i) by hostility towards persons who are of a particular sexual orientation, or
(ii) by hostility towards persons who have a disability or a particular disability.

The test in section 146 is deliberately one for evidence of 'hostility' rather than 'hatred' as the seriousness of the offense was considered to justify the application of a less strict test.

The Equality Act 2010, although allowing those to speak out when discriminated against, created a vulnerable category of people that consisted mainly of those with disabilities. It emphasizes the notion that those with disabilities can not leave their houses without being harassed and develops a divide between those who survive with disabilities and the rest of the world.

== Crime recording ==
The historical failure of police forces, prosecutors, and some social care organizations to treat disability hate crime as a serious issue, an echo of previous failures over other forms of hate crime, particularly racial and LGBT-focused hate crimes, has led to chronic under-reporting. This under-reporting is both pre-emptive, through a widespread belief within the disabled community that they will not be treated seriously by law enforcement, and post-facto, where police forces investigate the crime as non hate-based and record it as such. The National Crime Victim Survey completed in 2008 revealed that people with disabilities are twice as likely as those without disabilities to experience situations of violence. During this year, those with intellectual disabilities were at the highest risk for violence victimization.

Environments that struggle with deprivation are at higher risk for greater occurrence of disability hate crime. In southeast England, many with intellectual disabilities recall places such as schools, day centers, distant neighborhoods, and even forms of public transportation as areas "where bad things happen". Disability hate crime was stated as most prevalent in schools, colleges, and daycares.

It has been proven on multiple occasions that disability hate crimes are underreported due to police enforcement consistently making their own assumptions of the situation at hand and abusers perceiving impairments as vulnerability.

The UK Crown Prosecution Service's Annual Hate Crime Report, shows that 11,624 cases of racial or religious hate crime were prosecuted in England and Wales in 2009, with 10,690 leading to successful convictions. By contrast, only 363 prosecutions and 299 convictions were for disability hate crimes.

Through the years of 2012 and 2013, a crime survey among a large population of England and Wales had been completed. It was acknowledged that out of the estimated 62,000 disability-related hate crimes that happened during that time period, only 1,841 had been recorded by the police.

The UK charity Scope has conducted research into the prevalence and experience of disability hate crime, summarizing their findings and those of other disability groups in the report Getting Away With Murder Katharine Quarmby, who wrote the report and was the first British journalist to investigate disability hate crime, has also written a book on the matter.

== Perceived vulnerability ==
The treatment of disability hate crimes has been affected by the perception of disabled people as inherently vulnerable. This is a multi-faceted issue. Unfounded application of the 'vulnerable' label to a disabled person is considered a form of infantilization, a type of ableism in which disabled people are regarded as childlike, rather than as functioning adults.

Perceptions of vulnerability can also lead to the perception that the victim is partially or entirely responsible for the crime. For example, a disabled person may be perceived as having been at fault due to being alone after dark, i.e., engaged in risky behaviour. This pattern of victim-blaming has also appeared in the prosecution of rape and other sexual crimes.

On the other hand, it has been suggested that the vulnerability of victims is a key factor in all crimes. It has been applied to a wide variety of scenarios, including people working at night or handling large amounts of money, although these are situations; not categories of people.

The Crown Prosecution Service has issued guidance to its prosecutors reminding them that 'vulnerable' should only be used as a description of a person within the precise legal meaning of the term - for instance, as defined in section 16 of the Youth Justice and Criminal Evidence Act 1999.

== Psychological effects ==
It has been long known that there are emotional and mental impacts on victims of hate crimes. In a British Crime Survey, data indicated that there is an elevated psychological damage to hate victims compared to non-hate crime victims. Research conducted in the US has indicated that the elevated damage includes anxiety, loss of confidence, depression, long-term post-traumatic stress disorder, and fear. Victims of bias-motivated hate crimes such as hate crimes against a disability, race, religion, sexual orientation, ethnicity, gender, or gender identity are more likely to experience these psychological effects than victims of crimes that are not motivated by bias. The following statistics, from the Crime Survey for England and Wales, show that hate crime victims:

- were 36% more likely to say that they were emotionally affected and more likely to be 'very much' affected than victims of crime overall
- were 44% more likely to say that they suffered a loss of confidence or had felt vulnerable after the incident than victims of crime overall
- were twice as likely to experience fear, difficulty sleeping, anxiety or panic attacks, or depression compared with all victims of crime.

Disability hate crimes composed of 1.6% of total reported hate crimes in 2017. A survey conducted in 27 countries reported that 26% of 732 people with schizophrenia interviewed reported experiencing unfair treatment in their personal security, which included physical or verbal abuse attributed to having a mental health diagnosis. 29% reported having been unfairly treated in their neighborhood. Furthermore, a survey conducted by mental health charity MIND reported that 50% of all respondents with mental health problems experienced harassment in the workplace or community. 71% of these respondents experience physical or sexual violence, theft, or mistreatment. People with learning disabilities or mental health problems within the disabled group were most likely to experience violence or hostility.

OPM's research report on violence and hostility against disabled people found that hate crimes have impacts that extend past the physical and emotional harm experienced by the victims. Family members who may not be disabled themselves can similarly be victimized. Furthermore, disabled people who may have not been a victim to a hate crime may restructure their lives in order to avoid putting themselves at risk. Members of the community in where the hate crime occurs often feel a sense of shame and anger. This same study found that people with learning disabilities found significant dissatisfaction with the way they have been handled by the police, stating that police officers were often felt to be 'patronizing' or 'rude' and did not know how to communicate with the victims in an appropriate manner.

== Support ==
Disability hate crimes leave affected or vulnerable individuals in need of support. There can be a multitude of efforts made towards showcasing support. Support can consist of emotional support, physical assistance, advice, guidance, and more. There are some key tasks that are effective in supporting those impacted by disability hate crimes:

1. offering help to individuals vulnerable to hate crimes;
2. making an effort to lessen the impact that the abuse can make;
3. empowering individuals to stand for what is right;
4. not shying away from intervening on the issues.

Disability Hate Crime Support
Direct Victim Support	Indirect Victim Support
practical support emotional support advocacy counseling and psychological advice empowerment medical advice financial assistance referrals court/witness assistance court-based work legal advice/support mediation supporting victims of far-right violence	monitoring hate crime research media work promoting victim's rights policy work report writing training community work education increasing awareness campaigning

As more hate crimes occur, the need for support increases. Support is more in demand when there are more victims of disability hate crime. Support will always be needed or in demand, but the amount that will fulfill depends upon how much hardship and adversity those in the disability community are facing at a given moment.

== See also ==
- Ableism
- Disability abuse
- Mate crime
- Sagamihara stabbings
