= MP8 =

MP8 or MP 8 may refer to:

- Ypresian, or MP 8, a zone during the Eocene epoch
- Mario Party 8, a 2007 Wii video game and the first game for the console
