= Eco-ableism =

Form of discrimination in environmental movements

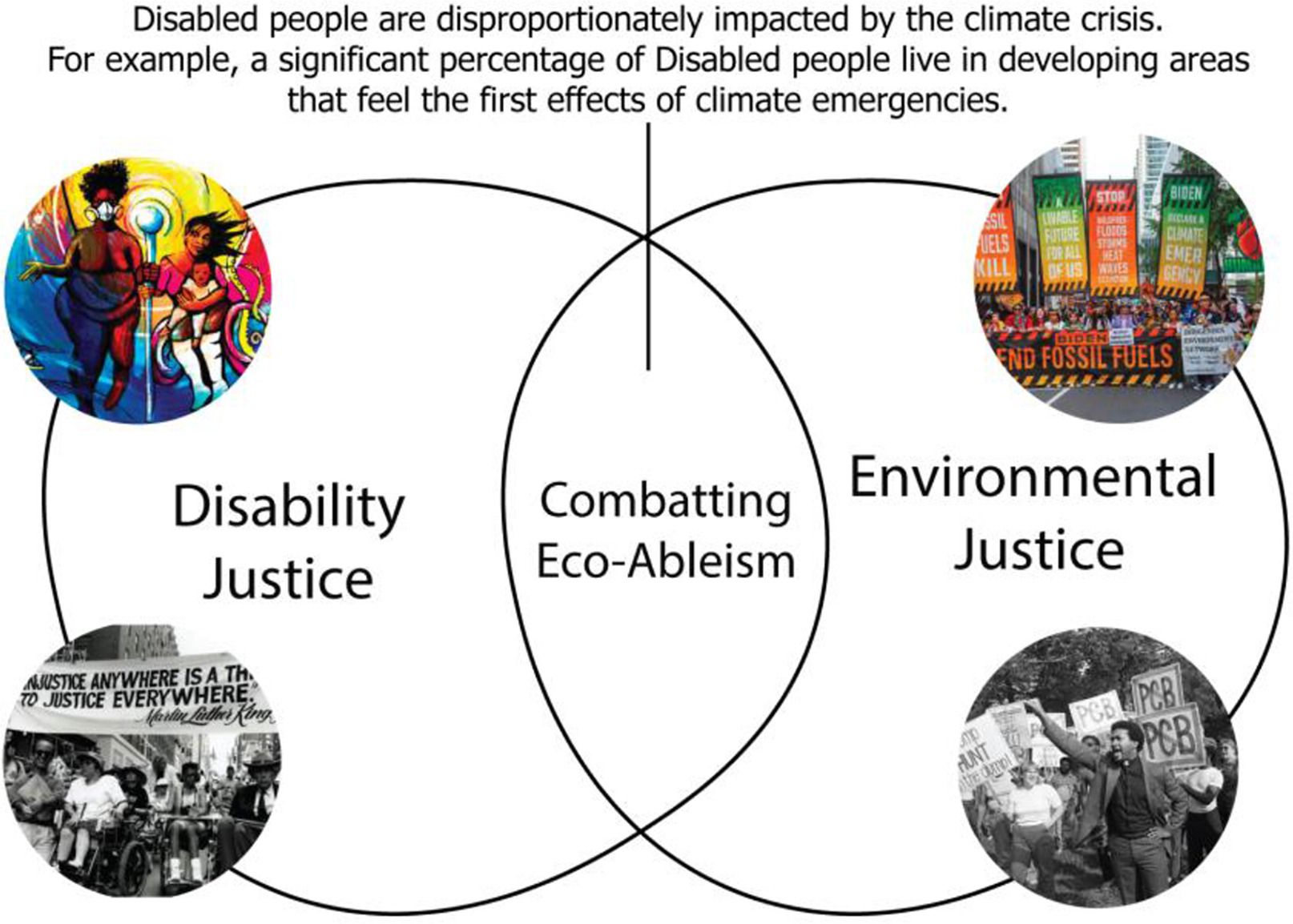
Addressing eco-ableism aligns the goals of disability justice with those of climate justice.

Eco-ableism is a form of ableism in which disabled people are excluded, marginalized, or misrepresented within environmental movements, policies, and discourses. This includes the design of environments that prioritize able-bodied and neurotypical experiences, the absence of disabled voices in environmental decision-making, the inaccessibility of environmental activism spaces, and the guilt or shame some disabled individuals may feel for using tools or resources deemed unsustainable by others. Advocates argue that environmental justice must include disability justice, guided by the principle of “nothing about us without us.”

== Coinage ==
The term was coined by disabled and neurodivergent environmental activists, and began appearing in scientific and journalistic literature in the early 2020s.

== Context ==
Eco-ableism occurs within a broader context in which disabled people experience heightened vulnerability to the impacts of the climate crisis. A growing body of research indicates that disabled individuals are disproportionately affected during climate-related events. For example, a 2022 study of heatwave-related deaths in Australia between 2001 and 2018 found that 89% of those who died—316 out of 354 individuals—were living with at least one disability. In this context, eco-ableism can be particularly harmful.

Despite this elevated risk, disabled people are often underrepresented in climate-related policy, planning, and research. They are more likely to experience poverty and are less frequently included in urban planning, public health and biomedical research, legal frameworks, and socioeconomic initiatives aimed at responding to climate change. This underrepresentation persists despite international legal obligations such as the 2006 United Nations Convention on the Rights of Persons with Disabilities (CRPD), which mandates the inclusion of disabled people in climate mitigation and adaptation efforts, including international development programs.

== Examples ==
- Plastic straw bans: While aimed at reducing single-use plastics, these bans have often failed to accommodate individuals with disabilities who rely on plastic straws to safely consume liquids. Some alternative materials like paper or metal are unsafe or impractical for certain medical needs.
- Emergency planning: Evacuation and protection measures against environmental hazards sometimes neglect the needs of disabled people, leading the latter to be even more vulnerable when disaster hits.
- Climate activism spaces: Protests and campaigns have been criticised for their lack of physical accessibility, sensory overload, and exclusion of disabled voices in leadership or strategic planning.
- Transportation infrastructure: Dedicated bike lanes can remove street parking that those with mobility issues depend on, as well as cut off disabled residents from easily accessing their homes. Floating bus stops, intended to create a safe route for cyclists separate from traffic, can lead to injuries and collisions for those with visual or hearing impairments.

== Intersectionality ==
By examining how the climate crisis and ableism combine and interact, eco-ableism fits within an intersectional approach to understanding and addressing drivers of inequality. This approach also highlights that eco-ableism itself does not affect all disabled people in the same way either. Many face overlapping forms of discrimination based not only on disability, but also on race, gender, class, age, Indigeneity, migration status, or geography. These intersecting inequalities can intensify exclusion from environmental decision-making and heighten vulnerability to the impacts of climate change. For instance, Indigenous people with disabilities may be disproportionately affected by environmental degradation that threatens land, culture, and food sovereignty, while also being excluded from policy discussions that shape climate action. Women with disabilities often experience barriers to water access, reproductive healthcare, and safety during climate disasters—especially in low-income or rural contexts.

Understanding eco-ableism through an intersectional lens reveals how environmental policies and designs can reinforce multiple forms of marginalisation at once. For example, inaccessible evacuation centres or disaster warnings may leave out not just disabled people generally, but especially those who also face language barriers, poverty, or institutional discrimination. Without accounting for these intersecting experiences, climate action can unintentionally prioritise certain bodies, voices, and communities—while excluding others. Addressing eco-ableism, therefore, requires inclusive climate strategies that actively centre diverse disability perspectives, particularly from those most affected and least represented.

== See also ==
- Environmental justice
- Environmental racism
- Ableism
- Disability justice
- Intersectionality
- Climate justice
