= Violence against people with disabilities =

People with disabilities face 1.5 times more violence than people without disabilities. The perpetrators are often people known to the person with disabilities, such as their partners, family members, friends, or acquaintances. It is estimated that 15% of the world's population lives with disability and are more likely to be poor and socially excluded. Thus violence against people with disabilities has many dimensions.

== Types of violence ==
As mentioned by Powers and Oschwald, there are seven categories of abusive behavior defined by both male and female individuals who have some form of disability: physical abuse, sexual abuse, verbal or emotional abuse, neglect or withholding support, financial abuse, manipulation of medications, and destroying or disabling equipment.

=== Institutional vs. non-institutional ===
When comparing institutional and non-institutional cases of violence against people with disabilities in the US, 82% of violence against people who are disabled happens when they are institutionalized. Common thought is that institutions "inherently promote abuse and dehumanization." Although institutionalized cases are far more present than non-institutionalized cases, US statistics show that sexual assault based violence is 7 times more likely among intellectually disabled people.

=== Victim-offender relationship ===
According to a 2017 US Department of Justice statistical report Crime Against Persons with Disabilities, persons with disabilities in the US are at risk of a higher rate of violence committed against them than their non-disabled peers. Additionally, individuals who have some form of disability are at a higher risk of being victimized by a well-known or casual acquaintance over a complete stranger unlike their non-disabled peers; people whom have experienced an act of violence by a stranger with a disability being at 30% while 39% of violence against non-disabled people is perpetrated by a complete stranger.

While many individuals may have experience supportive caregiver relationships, there is a notable amount of abuse involving family members or paid caregivers. Power imbalances within caregiving relationships can create opportunities for neglect, coercion, or assault. This is particularly seen when individuals rely on caregivers for daily living support and have limited ability to seek alternative assistance.

== Age ==
Age plays a major factor when looking into non-institutionalized violence. Children with disabilities are three to four times more likely to be victims of violence. Children with disabilities often face myriad physical, social and environmental barriers to full participation in society, including access to health care, education and other support services. They are also thought to be more vulnerable towards violence than children without disabilities. Understanding the extent of violence against children with disabilities is paramount in developing effective programmes to prevent them from violence and to improve their health and the quality of their lives in general.

In the US, those between the ages of 12 and 15 who have a disability experience violence at a rate of 144.1 out of 1000 persons compared to their non-disabled peers at a rate of 38.8 out of a thousand with a rate difference being 105.3. Disabled teens ranging from the ages of 16 to 19 experience violence at a rate of 86.6 out of 1000 persons compared to their non-disabled peers at the rate of 31.4 out of 1000 persons. Examining the age ranges of 20 to 24, and 25 to 34 collectively to represent a person's twenties to mid thirties, the data shows that people with some form of disability in that age range goes at a rate of 147.9 out of 1000 persons compared to 55.9 to their non-disabled peers with a rate difference of 92 out of 1000.

== Barriers to preventing violence and abuse ==
Efforts to prevent violence and abuse against people with disabilities are hindered by interconnected barriers. Service systems often place substantial authority with caregivers, creating environments where abuse can go unreported.

== Violence against women with disabilities ==
Women with disabilities face forms of violence faced by non disabled women and other disabled persons, but there are some forms of gender based violence that they face in particular. They experience a wider range of emotional, physical and sexual abuse. This can be by support workers, healthcare providers, family and strangers, and occurs throughout their life, from childhood and adolescence into late adulthood.

Violence against women and girls with disabilities fall into a number of policy gaps because of the inability to deal with the intersectional nature of the violence that these women experience.

Forms of violence against women with disabilities can include withholding of assistive devices, such as wheelchairs, hearing aids, and white canes, which may limit mobility and interaction with other people and creates a sense of powerlessness and dependency. Other forms include domestic violence; financial, verbal and emotional abuse; and human trafficking.

Disabled women, particularly those with intellectual disabilities, are more likely to be pressured or coerced into forced sterilizations.

On numerous occasions, disabled women have also been denied access to public spaces, or have been harassed for their presence in these spaces. Similar cases have been reported in India.

=== Increased vulnerability ===
Women with disabilities are extremely likely to face abuse, with at least one out of two disabled women experiencing some form of abuse in their lifetime. Women with disabilities are twice as likely as non disabled women to face domestic violence. Women with disabilities are also thrice as likely to be raped, physically abused or sexually assaulted when compared to their non-disabled counterparts. Disabled women often struggle to get away from abusers and access the support that will enable them to do so, as well as accessing justice after they have faced violence. They often also suffer humiliation at police stations and hospitals during the process of justice.

=== Lack of reporting ===
The particular difficulties faced by disabled women are often not captured in reporting on violence against women, since there is a lack of data on violence specifically against women with disabilities. Further, data on various kinds of crimes is usually not collected by kinds of disability—for example, as an NPR article reported, people with intellectual disabilities are sexually assaulted at a rate that is seven times higher than people without disabilities. In India, the National Crime Reports Bureau also does not collect separate data on violence against women and girls with disabilities.

== See also ==
- Mental disorder § Violence
- Sexual abuse and intellectual disability
- Ableism
