= Disability abuse =

Form of abuse

Disability abuse is when a person with a disability is abused physically, financially, sexually and/or psychologically due to the person being disabled. This type of abuse has also been considered a hate crime. The abuse is not limited to those who are visibly disabled or physically deformed, but also includes those with learning, intellectual and developmental disabilities or mental illnesses.

== Risk factors for abuse ==
According to the World Health Organization (WHO), disabled people make up around 15% of the world's population. Disabled children are three times more likely to face violence than non-disabled children, and there is an approximate 50% increased risk of experiencing violence for adults with mental health conditions.

Disabled people are easy targets for predators as they may not have the resources or abilities to escape an abusive situation or communicate about the occurrences. Hard of hearing persons are placed at twice the risk for neglect and emotional abuse in comparison to other disabilities and nearly four times in regards to physical abuse.

Abuse can occur in multiple ways, most commonly seen as physical, emotional, or sexual. Those in the disability population tend to be at higher risk due to lacking skills to protect themselves. Examples include: deficits in communication, limited social environment, disempowerment, and intimate contact required for hygiene dependency. Further, as there can be tendencies for caretakers to overprotect individuals during their youth, they can more easily be exploited due to a lack of preparation. In facets such as school there is often a lack of efficient sex education for disabled youth and in combination of improper training for professionals working with these children, risks increase. Notably there also tends to be overlap between abuse and neglect as childhood care often results in full dependency on care providers due to need for assistance throughout daily activities.

A community-based participatory research study to assess abuse and current physical and mental health of 350 members within varying disabilities found a significant correlation with depressive symptoms and significant relations between childhood abuse and depression, PTSD, and negative physical health outcomes in adulthood. The main finding was that interaction of childhood and adult abuse predicted increased negative physical and psychological health rates for those with developmental disabilities.

Women with disabilities face disproportionately high risks of abuse compared to women without disabilities. Research from the U.S. Centers for Disease Control and Prevention (CDC) indicates that both women and men with disabilities experience elevated rates of sexual violence and intimate partner violence; however, these disparities are especially pronounced among women. Data from the National Intimate Partner and Sexual Violence Survey (NISVS) reveal that a substantial proportion of female rape victims had a disability at the time of the assault. Centers for Disease Control and Prevention.

Women with disabilities may also experience forms of abuse that exploit their dependence on caregivers for daily living tasks. Reports from the U.S. Department of Health and Human Services describe cases in which abuse includes not only physical or sexual assault but also withholding medication or mobility aids, restricting access to communication devices, and exerting coercive control over reproductive or sexual autonomy.

Workplace harassment represents a significant vulnerability. A 2023 national survey conducted by The 19th News found that nearly half of women with disabilities reported experiencing workplace sexual harassment or assault—substantially higher than the rate among women without disabilities.

Researchers caution that the reported rates of abuse against women with disabilities are likely underestimated due to communication barriers, social isolation, and limited access to accessible reporting and support mechanisms.

== Forms of abuse ==
=== Bullying ===
A 2012 survey by the Interactive Autism Network found that 63% of autistic children are bullied in the United States. Over a third of Autistic adults said they had been bullied at work in a survey by the UK's National Autistic Society.

82% of children with a learning disability in the UK are bullied, according to Mencap, and 79% are scared to go out in case they are bullied.

A survey that was done shows that roughly seven out of ten disabled people have been abused, and that it is an ongoing problem. It was found that bullying people with disabilities is a problem in various other countries, and lacks attention.

Bullying is not always physical. Verbal bullying and cyberbullying occur often. Catherine Thornberry and Karin Olson claim that carers often dehumanize disabled people, taking away their abilities and qualities that make them a person and lowering them to the level of just an object or a thing. They found that the caregivers or assistants are often the ones who are unintentionally bullying the disabled individuals. The caregivers look at the individuals at lower standard than they do other people, leading to Thornberry and Olson labeling abuse of disabled individuals as a hate crime.

=== Sexual abuse ===
According to Valenti-Hein & Schwartz, only 3% of sexual abuse cases involving developmentally disabled people are ever reported; more than 90% of developmentally disabled people will experience sexual abuse at some point in their lives, and 49% will experience 10 or more abusive incidents.

A study published in the British Journal of Psychiatry by Sequeira, Howlin, & Hollins found that sexual abuse is associated with a higher incidence of psychiatric and behavioural disorder in people with learning disabilities in a case-control study. Sexual abuse was associated with increased rates of mental illness and behavioural problems, and with symptoms of post-traumatic stress. Psychological reactions to abuse were similar to those observed in the general population, but with the addition of stereotypical behavior. The more serious the abuse, the more severe the symptoms that were reported.

Sexual abuse is less likely to be reported by disabled individuals. The people that surround these individuals are often found to be less likely to report these cases of abuse. Many societies still view disabled people as weak and vulnerable, making it easy for the abuser to feel no remorse or to shift the blame away from themselves. More often than not, people figure they can trust their physicians or doctors who provide care for these individuals. In a clinical study it was found that the physicians would provide poor quality of care to individuals with disabilities. They would suppress the problems instead of addressing them by giving them drugs to make them be quiet. It was also found that physicians were less likely to report sexual abuse or any abuse that they found present on these individuals. They justified these actions by believing that disabled people are less valuable.

=== Institutional abuse ===
Institutional abuse overwhelmingly impacts disabled people, as intellectually disabled people and physically disabled people often live in institutional settings. Hospitals and care homes can both be settings where abuse occurs. Severe disability is a factor that increases the likelihood of elder abuse and neglect in nursing homes in Portugal.

== Impacts of abuse ==
There was one study done that shows 60 percent of disabled children come forth about being bullied regularly, versus 25 percent of the students who are being bullied that are not disabled. This can also affect their learning and school and education. Their grades are more at risk in dropping, they have a more difficult time concentrating, and there is no interest in school and the learning material. All of this can lead to the child dropping out of school.

== Current policies and research ==
There are policies such as Article 16 of the United Nations Convention on the Rights of Persons With Disabilities which calls for appropriate measures needed to protect all disabled people in all locations, from all forms of abuse. WHO made a statement emphasizing poor public health surveillance of child maltreatment across the world which has been conveyed through examples such as the Adverse Childhood Experience questionnaire which has been used to gain better understanding of the prevalence of abuse occurring worldwide, but comparisons can be challenging due to differing policies between regions.

Additional policies like the United States Child Abuse Prevention and Treatment Act passed in 1974 and reauthorized in 2019 created a state-based child abuse reporting and response system that requires professionals to be legally mandated to make a government report if a child alludes to the possibility of abuse or neglect to see if an investigation is needed.

== See also ==
- Ableism
- Conscription of people with disabilities
- Developmental disability abuse and vulnerability
- Disability hate crime
- Institutional abuse
- Sexual abuse of people with developmental disabilities
- Violence against people with disabilities
- Disability draft
- Freak
