= Ableism =

Discrimination on grounds of disability

Ableism (/ˈeɪbəlɪzəm/; also known as ablism, disablism [in British English], anapirophobia, anapirism, and disability discrimination) is discrimination and social prejudice against disabled people. Ableism characterizes people as being defined by their disabilities and also classifies people with disabilities as being inferior to non-disabled people. On this basis, people are assigned or denied certain perceived abilities, skills, or personality traits. Ableism perpetuates false ideas about individuals and groups with disabilities.

Ableism is rooted in stereotypes which are either associated with disability in general, or they are associated with specific impairments or chronic health conditions (e.g., the presumption that all people with disabilities want to be cured, the false belief that wheelchair users also have an intellectual disability, or the assumption that blind people have some special form of insight). These stereotypes, in turn, serve as a justification for discriminatory practices, and reinforce discriminatory attitudes and behaviors toward people who are disabled. Labeling affects people when it limits their options for action or changes their identity. In ableist societies, the lives of people with disabilities are considered less valuable or worth living, and sometimes even expendable. Even disabled war veterans, while often regarded as heroic, can face ableism and treated as less valuable.

The eugenics movement of the early 20th century, a movement promoting the discredited system of beliefs that proposed to improve the genetic quality of the human population, is considered an expression of widespread ableism. One of its central tenets was that people with disabilities were genetically inferior to able bodied persons, and it advocated for the Compulsory sterilization of persons with disabilities; compulsory sterilization of disabled persons observed under Nazi rule of Germany in the early 20th century.

Ableism can be directed towards persons with Physical disability, Invisible disability, or with a Mental disorder. Ableism on the basis of mental disorders or cognitive impairments is known as sanism.

Disability studies is an academic discipline which studies ableism.

== Etymology ==
Originating from -able (in disable, disabled) with influence of able (ultimately from Latin habilis) and -ism (in racism, sexism); first recorded in 1981.

== In nations ==
=== Canada ===
The specific types of discrimination that have occurred or are still occurring in Canada include the inability to access important facilities such as infrastructure within the transport network, restrictive immigration policies, involuntary sterilization to stop people with disabilities from having offspring, barriers to employment opportunities, wages that are insufficient to maintain a minimal standard of living, and institutionalization of people with disabilities in substandard conditions.

Austerity measures implemented by the government of Canada have also been referred to as ableist, such as funding cuts that put people with disabilities at risk of living in abusive arrangements.

=== United Kingdom ===
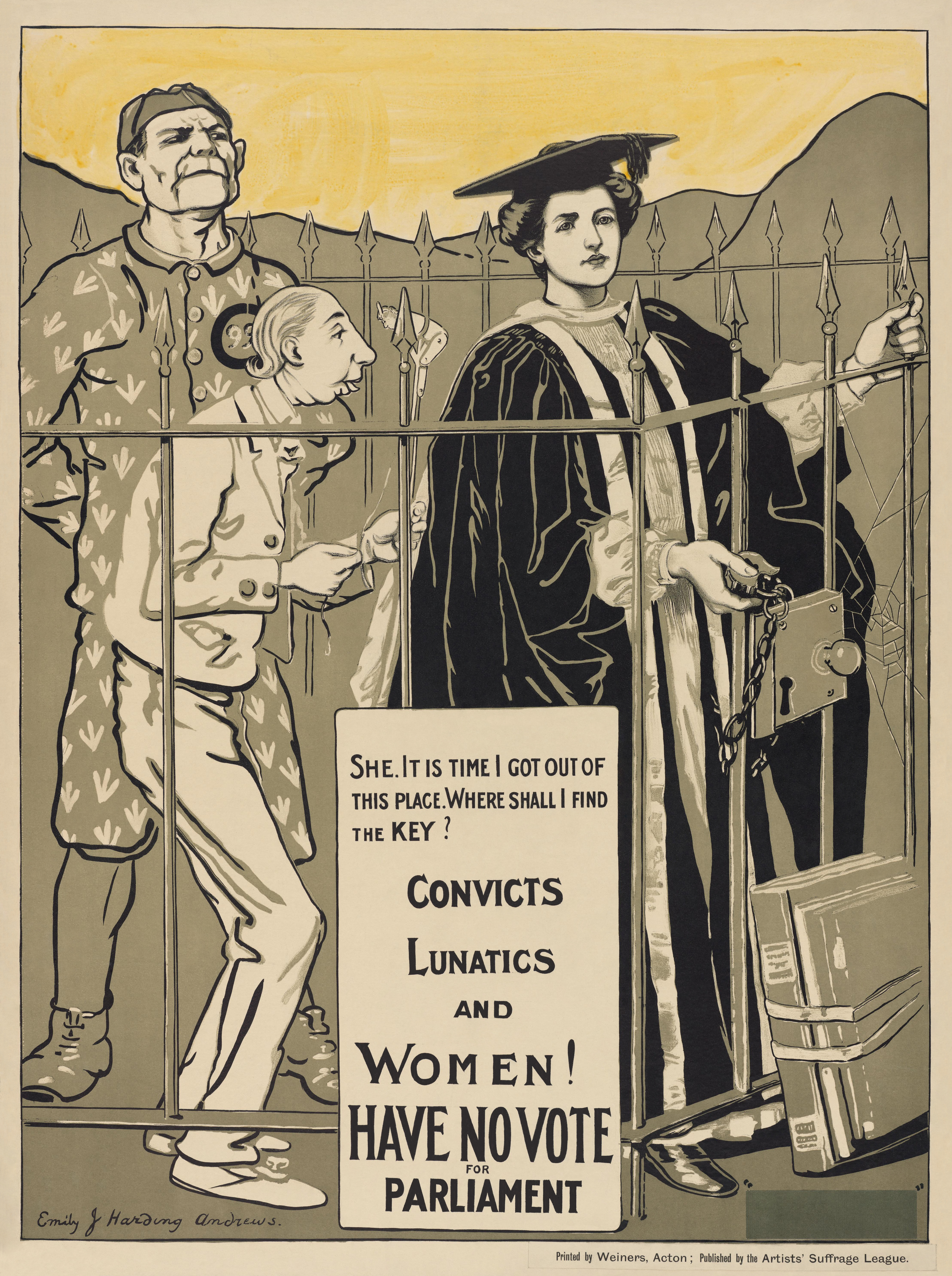
A poster of the British suffrage movement, attacking the fact that women were placed next to "lunatics" and convicts in being unable to vote. Ableist and eugenicist ideas were often found in suffrage rhetoric.

In the UK, disability discrimination became unlawful as a result of the Disability Discrimination Act 1995, and the Disability Discrimination Act 2005. These were later superseded, retaining the substantive law, by the Equality Act 2010. The Equality Act 2010 brought together protections against multiple areas of discriminatory behavior (disability, race, religion and belief, sex, sexual orientation, gender identity, age and pregnancy – the so-called "protected characteristics").

Under the Equality Act 2010, there are prohibitions addressing several forms of discrimination including direct discrimination (s.13), indirect discrimination (s.6, s.19), harassment (s.26), victimisation (s.27), discrimination arising from disability (s.15), and failure to make reasonable adjustments (s.20).

Part 2, chapter 1, section 6, of the Equality Act 2010 states that "A person (P) has a disability if (a) P has a physical or mental impairment, and (b) the impairment has a substantial and long-term adverse effect on P's ability to carry out normal day-to-day activities."

=== United States ===
Much like many other minority groups, Americans with disabilities were segregated and denied certain rights for a majority of American history. In the 1800s, a shift from a religious view to a more scientific view took place. Until the 1970s, ableism in the United States was often codified into law. For example, in many jurisdictions, so-called "ugly laws" barred people from appearing in public if they had diseases or disfigurements that were considered unsightly. Public stigma began to change after World War II when many Americans returned home with disabilities. In the 1960s, following the civil rights movement in America, the disabled rights movement began. The movement advocates for giving all individuals with disabilities equal rights and opportunities.

=== Japan ===
Society and culture in Japan are influenced by the culture of conformity represented by the character Wa (和). Central to Wa is the integration of individuals into a harmonic system that treats societies not as a collection of individuals, but as a singular entity. Individuals are expected to conform to this concept for the benefit of society, even if it means sacrificing individuality. As a result, disability in Japan is seen as a break in conformity and therefore faces challenges in terms of acceptance into Japan's homogeneous culture. For example, children in Japanese elementary schools are subject to the concept of mimamori; the practice of watching over children protectively while granting them autonomy in their actions, specifically interactions with other children and their physical activities. This approach to education leaves children with disabilities subject to peers who are more socially adept than them, with no attempt made by teachers to interfere because of mimamori's stance on autonomy. Japanese educators emphasize protecting children with disabilities from social stigma, along with following the guardian's wishes for how to guide their child.

On July 26, 2016, 26-year-old former care-home worker Satoshi Uematsu drove to the Tsukui Yamayuri-en care facility in Sagamihara, Japan, and killed 19 residents and injured 25 others, all of whom possessed disabilities. Uematsu later drove to the Tsukui police station, where he was detained by law enforcement. Uematsu's motivations for the attack were later released to the public by police in a letter he had written to the speaker of the lower house of parliament, where Uematsu wished for the euthanization of people with disabilities if unable to contribute to society. Although not representative of Japan's attitude towards disabled people, Uematsu's stabbings are an example of how strong attitudes toward conformity in Japan are towards disabled people.

Despite these attitudes, Japan has taken legislative action in the past two decades delineating the definitions and protections for people with disabilities. In 2012, Japan ratified the UN Convention on the Rights of People with Disabilities which laid the groundwork for an official definition of disability and equitable treatment in Japan. In 2013, Japan added two core principles of the UN convention into law, prohibition of discrimination (sabetsu kinshi) and reasonable accommodation (gōriteki hairyo). Japan's addition of reasonable accommodation was based on the U.S. model of reasonable accommodation, which furthered efforts for equity for disabled people by adapting environments and situations for individual needs. In April 2024, Japan's amendments for the Act for Eliminating Discrimination against Persons with Disabilities took effect, mandating that all government, public, and private companies must provide reasonable accommodation for those with disabilities.

=== International law ===
In May 2012, the UN Convention on the Rights of Persons with Disabilities was ratified. The document established the inadmissibility of discrimination on the basis of disability, including in employment. In addition, the amendments created a legal basis for significantly expanding opportunities to protect the rights of persons with disabilities, including in the administrative procedure and in court. The law defined specific obligations that all owners of facilities and service providers must fulfill to create conditions for disabled people equal to the rest.

== Workplace ==
In the United States, the Americans with Disabilities Act of 1990 was put in place to prohibit private employers, state and local government, employment agencies, and labor unions from discrimination against qualified disabled people in job applications, when hiring, firing, advancement in workplace, compensation, training, and on other terms, conditions and privileges of employment. The U.S. Equal Employment Opportunity Commission (EEOC) plays a part in fighting against ableism by being responsible for enforcing federal laws that make it illegal to discriminate against a job applicant or an employee because of the person's race, color, religion, sex (including pregnancy, gender identity, and sexual orientation), national origin, age (40 or older), disability or genetic information.

Similarly in the UK, the Equality Act 2010 was put in place and provides legislation that there should be no workplace discrimination. Under the act, all employers have a duty to make reasonable adjustments for their disabled employees to help them overcome any disadvantages resulting from the impairment. Failure to carry out reasonable adjustment amounts to disability discrimination.

== Healthcare ==
=== Clinical settings ===
Ableism can occur in clinical settings, creating barriers to the availability and quality of care for people with disabilities.these barriers can include "physical barriers (e.g., lack of accessible entrances and wayfinding assistance at treatment facilities), transportation barriers (e.g., shortage of accessible, reliable, and affordable transit options), and information barriers (e.g., inaccessible intake paperwork, after-visit summaries, and online patient portals)."

Ableist beliefs that the treatments and accommodations which disabled persons receive for their conditions are synonymous with a decreased quality of life often leads medical professionals administer inadequate or improper treatment.

Several states, including Alabama, Arizona, Kansas, Pennsylvania, Tennessee, Utah, and Washington allow healthcare providers, in times of crisis, to triage based on the perceived quality of life of the patients, which tends to be perceived as lower for those with disabilities. In Alabama, a ventilator-rationing scheme put in place during the pandemic enabled healthcare providers to exclude patients with disabilities from treatment; such patients were those who required assistance with various activities of daily living, had certain mental conditions (varying degrees of intellectual disability or moderate-to-severe dementia) or other preexisting conditions categorized as disabilities.

In June 2020, near the start of the COVID-19 pandemic, a 46-year-old quadriplegic in Austin, Texas named Michael Hickson was denied treatment for COVID-19, sepsis, and a urinary tract infection and died 6 days after treatment was withheld. His physician was quoted as having said that he had a "preference to treat patients who can walk and talk." The physician also had stated his belief that Hickson's brain injury made him have not much of a quality of life. Several complaints have since been filed with the Texas Office of Civil Rights and many disability advocacy groups have become involved in the case.

Instances of ableism in healthcare as described above are often regarded to simply be "common sense". This "common sense" mentally means that "people with disabilities are routinely made vulnerable in medical settings."

=== Criminal justice settings ===
The provision of effective healthcare for people with disabilities in criminal justice institutions is an important issue because the percentage of disabled people in such facilities has been shown to be larger than the percentage in the general population. A lack of prioritization on working to incorporate efficient and quality medical support into prison structures endangers the health and safety of disabled prisoners.

Limited access to medical care in prisons can consist of long waiting times to meet with physicians and to consistently receive treatment, as well as the absence of harm reduction measures and updated healthcare protocols. Discriminatory medical treatment also takes place through the withholding of proper diets, medications, and assistance (equipment and interpreters), in addition to failures to adequately train prison staff. Insufficient medical accommodations can worsen prisoners' health conditions through greater risks of depression, HIV/AIDS and Hepatitis C transmission, and unsafe drug injections.

In Canada, the usage of prisons as psychiatric facilities may involve issues concerning inadequate access to medical support, particularly mental health counseling, and the inability of prisoners to take part in decision-making regarding their medical treatment. The usage of psychologists employed by the correctional services organization and the lack of confidentiality in therapeutic sessions also present barriers for disabled prisoners. That makes it more difficult for prisoners with disabilities to express discontentment about problems in the available healthcare since it may later complicate their release from the prison.

In the United States, the population of older adults in the criminal justice system is growing rapidly, but older prisoners' healthcare needs are not being sufficiently met. One specific issue includes a lack of preparation for correctional officers to be able to identify geriatric disability. Further improvement is needed in training programs to allow officers to learn when and how to provide proper healthcare intervention and treatment for older adult prisoners.

=== Healthcare policy ===
Ableism has long been a serious concern in healthcare policy, and the COVID-19 pandemic has greatly exaggerated and highlighted the prevalence of this serious concern. Studies frequently show what a "headache" patients with disabilities are for the healthcare system. In a 2020 study, 83.6% of healthcare providers preferred patients without disabilities to those with disabilities. This policy is especially concerning since according to the CDC, people with disabilities are at a heightened risk for contracting COVID-19. Additionally, in the second wave of the COVID-19 pandemic in the UK, people with intellectual disabilities were told that they will not be resuscitated if they become ill with COVID-19.

=== Healthcare research ===
The concept of ableism is often misused in medical research and population health research, which causes issues in understanding the impact of ableism. Such research also typically

does not consult with actual disabled individuals enough to understand their experiences outside of a clinical, medical sense. In other words, there is a lack of understanding of "disabled people to be reliable narrators of their experiences in clinical settings." These circumstances can lead to a narrow understanding of disabilities and ableism in medical population health research. Solutions proposed for the pervasive issues on disability and ableism research includes focus on the challenges to "traditional and often unarticulated assumptions" about disability and ableism. Research needs to emphasize on lived experiences of disabled people outside the healthcare system, in order to gain a deeper understanding of those disabilities, but also of the ableism that may be impacting individual experiences.

== Education ==
Ableism makes the world inaccessible to disabled people, especially in schools. Within education systems, the use of the medical model of disability and social model of disability contributes to the divide between students within special education and general education classrooms. Oftentimes, the medical model of disability portrays the overarching idea that disability can be corrected and diminished at the result of removing children from general education classrooms. This model of disability suggests that the impairment is more important than the person, who is helpless and should be separated from those who are not disabled.

The social model of disability suggests that people with impairments are disabled as a result of the way society acts. When students with disabilities are pulled out of their classrooms to receive the support that they need, that often leads their peers to socially reject them because they don't form relationships with them in the classroom. By using the social model of disability, inclusive schools where the social norm is not to alienate students can promote more teamwork and less division throughout their campuses.

Implementing the social model within modern forms of inclusive education provides children of all abilities with the role of changing discriminatory attitudes within the school system. For example, a student with disabilities may need to read text instead of listening to a tape recording of the text. In the past, schools have focused on fixing the disability, but progressive reforms make schools now focused on minimizing the impact of a student's disability and giving support. Moreover, schools are required to maximize access to their entire community. In 2004, U.S. Congress made into law the Individuals with Disabilities Education Act, which states that free and appropriate education is eligible to children with disabilities with insurance of necessary services. Congress later amended the law, in 2015, to include the Every Student Succeeds Act, which guarantees equal opportunity for people with disabilities full participation in society, and the tools for overall independent success.

== Types of ableism ==
- Sanism, or mental ableism, is discrimination based on mental health conditions and cognitive disabilities.
- Structural ableism is failing to provide accessibility tools: ramps, wheelchairs, special education equipments, etc. (Which is often also an example of Hostile architecture.)
- Internalised ableism is a person with disabilities discriminating against themself and other people with disabilities by holding the view that disability is something to be ashamed of or something to hide or by refusing accessibility or support. Internalised ableism may be a result of mistreatment of disabled individuals.
- Benevolent ableism is when people treat the disabled person well but like a child (infantilization), instead of considering them full grown adults. Examples include ignoring disabilities (such as the RNIB's "See the person" campaign), not respecting the life experiences of the disabled person, microaggression, not considering the opinion of the disabled person in important decision making, invasion of privacy or personal boundaries, forced corrective measures, unwanted help, not listening to the disabled person, etc.
- Eco-ableism refers to the forms of ableism that arise within environmental movements, policies, and discourses, leading to the exclusion, marginalisation, or misrepresentation of disabled people.

== Causes of ableism ==
Ableism may have evolutionary and existential origins (fear of contagion, fear of death). It may also be rooted in belief systems (social Darwinism, meritocracy), language (such as "suffering from" disability), or unconscious biases.

== See also ==
- Conscription of people with disabilities
- Disability abuse
- Disability and poverty
- Disability hate crime
- Disability rights movement
- Epistemic injustice
- Inclusion (disability rights)
- Mentalism (discrimination)
- Medical industrial complex
- Violent behavior in autistic people
- Violence against people with disabilities
- Mortality of autistic individuals
