= Wa (Japanese culture) =

Japanese concept of "harmony"

Wa (和) is a Japanese cultural concept usually translated into English as "harmony". It implies a peaceful unity and conformity within a social group in which members prefer the continuation of a harmonious community over their personal interests. The kanji character wa (和) is also a name for "Japan; Japanese", replacing the original graphic pejorative transcription Wa 倭 "dwarf/submissive people".

Wa is considered integral to Japanese society and derives from traditional Japanese family values. Individuals who break the ideal of wa to further their own purposes are brought in line either overtly or covertly, by reprimands from a superior or by their family or colleagues' tacit disapproval. Hierarchical structures exist in Japanese society primarily to ensure the continuation of wa. Public disagreement with the party line is generally suppressed in the interests of preserving the communal harmony.

Japanese businesses encourage wa in the workplace, with employees typically given a career for life in order to foster a strong association with their colleagues and firm. Rewards and bonuses are usually given to groups, rather than individuals, further enforcing the concept of group unity.

== See also ==
- Collectivism
- Kannagara, a belief in Shinto about harmony with the gods
