= Institutionalization of children with disabilities in Russia =

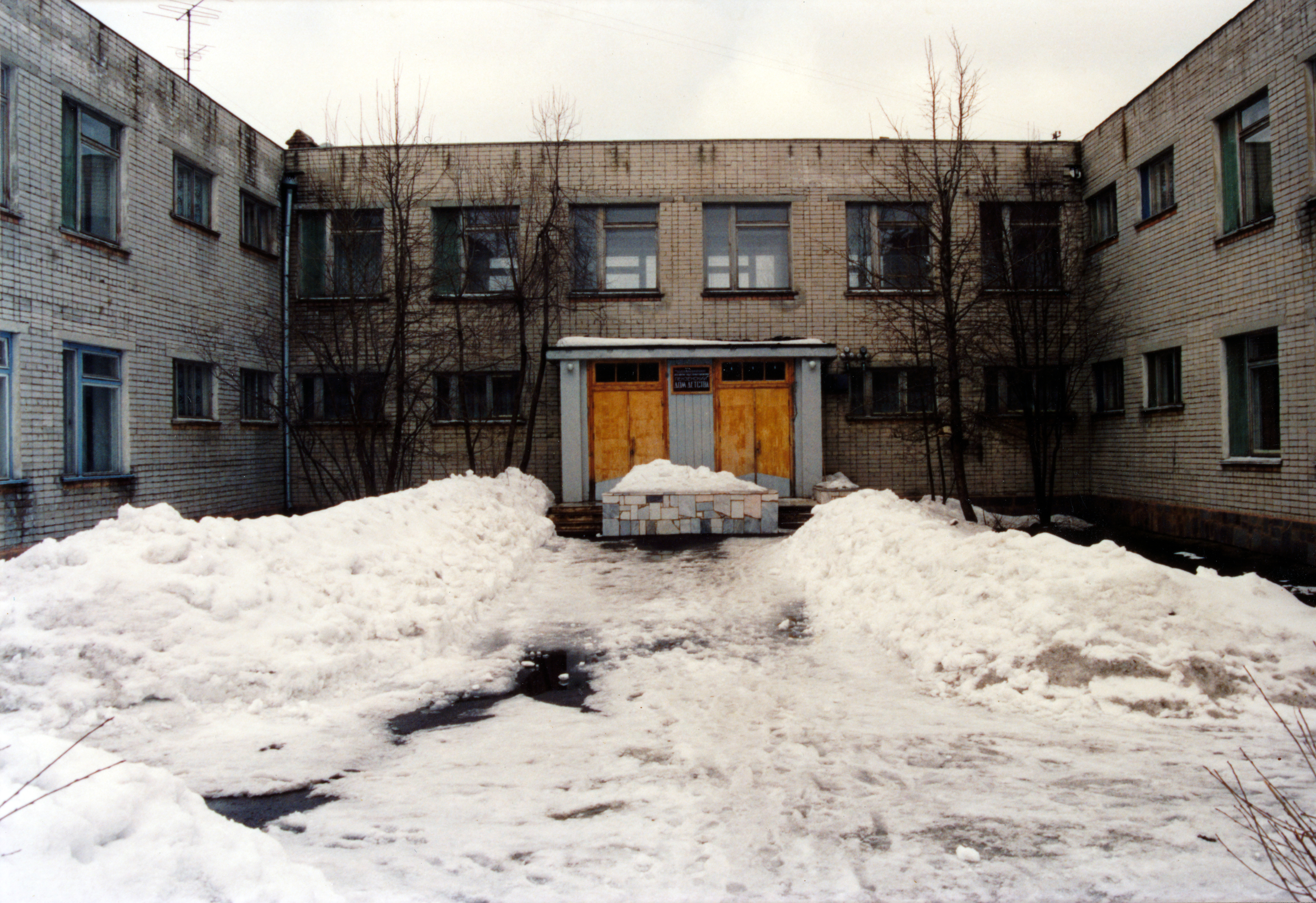
Russian orphanage

Institutionalization or the placement of children with disabilities, who have been abandoned or whose parents cannot support them, into a facility which can be similar to an orphanage often occurs in countries where alternative methods of care are not available. The definition of an institution can be ambiguous; the "Report of the Ad Hoc Expert Group on the Transition from Institutional to Community-based Care" defines an institution based on the following guidelines:

- A facility that is separated from the local community and does not allow for normal community interaction
- A facility that houses a large group of non-family members who are made to follow a pre-planned schedule that may not meet their individual needs
- A facility that provides housing for individuals who are segregated due to a disability and have to live in isolation for prolonged periods of time According to the Convention on the Rights of the Child, Article 23: "States Parties recognize that a mentally or physically disabled child should enjoy a full and decent life, in conditions which ensure dignity, promote self-reliance and facilitate the child's active participation in the community." The Committee on the Rights of the Child finds that institutions have become a widespread option for the placement of children with disabilities. The 2006 General Comment No.9 reports concern with the lack of adequate treatment provided, as well as increased vulnerability to institutional abuse and neglect. In Russia, 400,000 to 600,000 children are under institutional care, and these children are subject to the concerns stated in the committee's report.

== Soviet ideology of institutionalization ==
In 1917, the Russian Revolution resulted in Soviet ideology that centered around the idea of creating a society free of anomalies. As such, children born with disabilities were considered "defective", and the policy on "defectology" was developed through resolutions passed by the Council of Ministers of the USSR. According to law, parents had to send their children to institutions, as familial care was viewed as inadequate for the upbringing of children with special needs; the state found it necessary to correct such disabilities, and the provision of necessary treatment was promised. Such policies were influenced by Lev Vygotsky's Institute of Defectology, which was based on the idea that all children should be corrected to have normal functioning. If they were unable to participate and meet the requirements of "normal" standards when attending school, they were considered to be "uneducable" and were subject to a life of institutionalization, isolated and segregated from the public. Schools did not have the flexibility to adjust to their needs. The establishment of social segregation was widely accepted, and a distinct separation between individuals with disabilities and the rest of society was part of everyday life in Russia. Early isolation of these individuals was not specific to the early years, as it continued unto adult life due to laws that grouped citizens with disabilities into one area of employment, further alienating them from society.

== Effects of institutionalization on children ==
The 1998 report "Findings and Recommendations of a UNICEF Sponsored Fact-finding Mission to the Russian Federation" found instances of children left neglected and constricted with restraints, as well as cases of stereotypies, such as self-inflicted physical harm and rocking in Russian institutions. Also observed was the confinement of children to a bed-ridden state for hours and days and the segregation of older children into separate institutional classrooms, where they were subject to inadequate education. The report attributed such conditions to lack of necessary resources and overworked staff, who are unable to provide the necessary care to all children. Institutionalized children were often confined to their beds or cribs by staff if the child was considered contagious of an infectious disease or if they were too weak to be moved from their bed. Children of highest concern to orphanage administrators were forcefully bed-ridden and often restricted with rags of fabric to cribs in designated "lying-down rooms". Its common that a disabled child in an institution is considered contagious because of their mental conditions including children diagnosed with schizophrenia. Orphanage staff neglect the children with the belief that care will "spoil" the children (Human Rights Watch report). Children are left deprived of experiencing being outdoors and being given emotional attention.

Research related to institutional care has been conducted in various European countries and found that these types of environments lead to a plethora of negative consequences. The following are common effects:

- Developmental delay is prevalent due to the absence of physical stimulation and presence of daily neglect, as is motor skill delay, inadequate brain development, impairment in social and cognitive skills, and speech impediments. Attachment disorders are also common, which lead to harmful self-inflicting actions. Enuresis, anxiety disorders, eating disorders, as well as difficulty in forming healthy relationships have also been reported.
- Delay in physical development occurs for a variety of reasons. Malnutrition, lack of immunization, improper feeding, and depression resulting from lack of emotional attention all contribute to physical growth delays among children. Widespread infectious disease and problems with vision, hearing, low height and weight, along with microcephaly have been reported. While children may have correctable birth defects, surgery or necessary treatment is rarely provided.
- Institutional abuse is widespread, leading to further physical and emotional damage. Sexual abuse also occurs, but the actual frequency is unknown.

== Current situation ==
In 1993, the Russian constitution incorporated articles that included protection for children. The implementation of these articles were to be secured through various regulations, as well as the Federal Law on Basic Guarantees of the Rights of the Child, which was initiated on 21 July 1998, and incorporates the principles outlined in the Convention on the Rights of the Child. Despite these laws, services in Russia for children with disabilities reflect the attitudes established during the Soviet Era, as parents report that they are still encouraged to leave their children to institutional care. Recently, more families have ignored this advice and opt to care for their children even though some have had to follow the initial advice at a later time due to financial difficulties. Mothers also report facing general hostility from society when opting to take care of their children instead placing them in a government facility, and stigmas concerning disability are still prevalent in Russian society.

As of 2013, the Russian federal law, "On Education", gave children with disabilities the right to attend general education schools alongside other children without disabilities attending the closest school to home.

Following the 2013 developments, 10 St. Petersburg schools are being developed with inclusive education programs for children with disabilities, with funding of 9.7 million rubles, equivalent to ₽19.4 million in 2023. Children with disabilities are gradually accessing more accommodations to regular schooling and college education within recent years.

The Russian Labor and Social Protection Ministry report that amongst the people in Russia who have received higher education, disabled children have at a rate of "two times lower than the number of non-disabled people".

=== Government provisions ===
When newborns to four-year-olds are abandoned by their parents for various reasons, they are taken to Baby Houses, which are under the regulation of the Ministry of Health. Those that are four years of age are then evaluated to determine what institution they should be assigned. Institutions regulated by the Ministry of Education and Science house those deemed educable, and other children, determined to be uneducable, go to institutions which are supervised by the Ministry of Labor and Social Development. As adults, those categorized as uneducable transfer to an adult institution, where some facilities leave individuals to live in a bed-ridden state.

Once children with disabilities in Russian orphanages turn 18, many are moved to adult closed state institutions without the consent from the young person.

A Human Rights Watch study suggested that:

- Across five cities in Russia, 28 cases were documented of children being forcefully transferred to an adult institution once they turn 18,
- Along with 18 cases of children being moved to a St. Petersburg adult institution from their current St. Petersburg institution for children.

The 2020 Human Rights Watch study also indicated that there are many instances of children living in Russian orphanages being coerced into signing paperwork to join an adult institution without being offered support or knowledge of how to live independently. Some young adults were driven to an adult institution without notice or consent.

The Children of Pavlovsk organization was developed by Margarete von der Borchas, a charity established in 1992 to help children who have reached 18 years old and are unable to continue to live in Russian orphanages. "our goal is to transform these institutions into institutions that support families."

=== Special education ===
According to the Library of Congress, about 1.6 million children in Russia need access to special education. Despite legal rulings that allow children to attend school and mandate that specialized education be available, most do not receive a public education. Advances, however, have been made to provide rehabilitation services according to disability. Eight schools exist that serve individuals with the following disabilities: severe retardation, various ranges of blindness and deafness, as well as severe motor problems. The Library of Congress reports that "In 2006, Russia had 1,373 boarding schools for 170,000 children with speech, hearing, and language pathology, vision impairment, mental retardation, skeletal diseases, and tuberculosis; and 1,946 day schools for 236,000 disabled students." Primarily, though, children are placed into institutions at an early age. Since 1993, the Ministry of Education made a recommendation regarding the creation of the availability of classes for children with learning disabilities, but this sort of social change is still in progress.

== Initiatives ==
=== International proposed plans ===
Several international bodies have created principles that uphold the rights of children with disabilities. In 2008, World Health Organization's Better Health, Better Lives Initiative states that its goal is to: "[E]nsure that all children and young people with intellectual disabilities are fully participating members of society, living with their families, integrated in the community and receiving health care and support proportional to their needs." The Convention on the Rights of Persons with Disabilities has created the following articles outlining the rights of children with disabilities, which also protect against institutionalization.

- equality and non-discrimination (art. 5);
- right to life (art. 10);
- equal recognition before the law (art.12);
- right to liberty and security (art. 14);
- freedom from torture or cruel, inhuman or degrading treatment or punishment (art. 15);
- freedom from exploitation, violence and abuse (art.16);
- respect for physical and mental integrity (art. 17);
- right to live independently and be included in the community (art. 19);
- respect for privacy (art. 22); and
- respect for home and the family (art. 23).

Concern related to the violation of the CRPD's articles led to a United Nations General Day of Discussion, which further led to the UN guidelines on the Alternative Care of children in 2009. Paragraph 22 states: "While recognizing that residential care facilities and family-based care complement each other in meeting the needs of children, where large residential care facilities (institutions) remain, alternatives should be developed in the context of an overall deinstitutionalization strategy, with precise goals and objectives, which will allow for their progressive elimination." In order to adhere to the guidelines and end the practice of institutionalization, the Europe Regional Office branch of the United Nations Human Rights created a set of suggested solutions in their report "The Rights of Vulnerable Children Under the Age of Three: Ending their placement in institutional care". These solutions include:

- Resources for families, such as community support, education, healthcare, and appropriate levels of preventative, supportive, or rehabilitative service according to need.
- Economic aid to help with additional costs associated with providing adequate care for children with disabilities. This aid can be in the form of grants, social pensions, or any other form of financial assistance.
- Appropriate care options if families are unwilling to keep the child. Such facilities must provide support, education, and integrated services. In circumstances where parents are willing but unable to take care of the child, there should be the opportunity for children to have as much interaction with their parents as possible.

=== Russian government ===
The United States Library of Congress reports that "[u]ntil 1979, disabled children were not legally recognized in the Soviet Union because disability was defined as an inability to perform professional functions due to a sickness or trauma." As a result, no benefits were given to persons with disabilities. On 14 December 1979, children under the age of sixteen were able to obtain health benefits if they had a certain disease, as outlined by the Ministry of Health Care Regulation No. 1265. The ratification of the 1993 Russian Constitution initiated advancements in human rights for all by outlining guidelines that guarantee all individuals freedoms. While institutionalization is still widespread, when children are to be assessed according to their abilities, the parents are ensured certain guarantees. Parents must be informed of the evaluation and they must agree with the determined institution before the child is relocated. The adequate placement of children into proper institutions may not be accurate, as necessary resources are sometimes unavailable.

=== United States adoption ===
In a 2005 study of 105 "Postinstitutionalized Children of Intercountry Adoption" more than half of them adopted in the United States were from China and Russia. The children from Eastern Europe initially "exhibited 1 month of delayed growth for every 5 months they had spent institutionalized. They also demonstrated delayed fine motor (82%), gross motor (70%), language (59%), and social–emotional (53%) skills." In post-adoption analysis, the study found that 60.4% of adopting parents reported "no continuing medical or developmental difficulties for their children." While this study reported findings collected from 105 children, its authors stated that much more information must be gathered to assess the changes adoption makes in the development and growth of children who have been institutionalized previously.
