= Bodymind (disability studies) =

View of relationship of mind & body

In disability studies, the term bodymind refers to the intricate and often inseparable relationship between the body and the mind, and how these two units might act as one. Disability scholars use the term bodymind to emphasize the interdependence and inseparability of the body and mind.

== History ==
Disability studies scholars who have written academically about the bodymind include Eli Clare, Margaret Price, Sami Schalk, Alyson Patsavas, and Alison Kafer. Clare and Price have proposed that the bodymind expresses the interrelatedness of mental and physical processes, and Schalk defines the bodymind similarly as it pertains to disability and race. Margaret Price introduced the term "bodymind" for disability studies in her 2011 book Mad at School and developed it further in her 2015 article "The Bodymind Problem and the Possibilities of Pain." Price writes that the combination of 'body' and 'mind' in one term acknowledges that "mental and physical processes not only affect each other but also give rise to each other—that is, because they tend to act as one, even though they are conventionally understood as two". Price also emphasizes how the understanding of bodymind can influence diagnosis. In the context of the medical–industrial complex, Price comments that psychiatrists ultimately "wield the power of the prescription pad." Additionally, Eli Clare, a writer and activist for queer and disability studies, uses bodymind in his 2017 work Brilliant Imperfection as a way to resist common Western assumptions that the body and mind are separate entities, or that the mind is "superior" to the body. Like Price, he questions the systems that perpetuate diagnoses that frame people with disabilities as broken or in need of fixing.

== Schalk's "psychic stress" of oppression ==
Scholar Sami Schalk in her 2018 book Bodyminds Reimagined uses the term bodymind to recognize that "processes within our being impact one another in such a way that the notion of a physical versus mental process is difficult, if not impossible to clearly discern in most cases". Schalk emphasizes the utility of the term bodymind as it relates to disability and race. In analyzing histories of race, gender, and disability, Schalk notes that it is important to recognize the non-physical impact of various oppressions. For Schalk, the term bodymind highlights the "psychic stress" of oppression. In relation to transgenerational trauma in people of color, bodymind is used to show how the psychological toll of oppression and its resulting stress has lasting mental and physical manifestations.

== Feminist disability studies ==
Bodymind also arises in feminist studies, first discussed by Gloria Anzaldúa. Margaret Price claims that the connection between the physical body and the mind is a materialist feminist disability studies concept. According to Nirmala Erevelles, Professor of Social and Cultural Studies in Education at the University of Alabama, understanding that identities are forever-shifting, recognizing the importance of the body, and considering how intersectionality affects and restricts the body are all important to comprehending the bodymind concept. Erevelles' theory aims to focus on the role of interactions with others (specifically other's bodies) and how that is manifested in one's identity. Additionally, this theory notes the importance of acknowledging that not everyone has equal access to these interactions. This concept has stimulated conversation related to pain, desire, and cures. Price has related this theory to her claim of a universal need for the validation of one's pain as "real and important", while acknowledging we may not know what someone's pain feels like. Price also goes on to describe care as a united force. Additionally, Black queer feminist scholar, Sami Schalk, highlights the impact of oppression on marginalized individuals/communities on a mental, spiritual, and physical level.

== Disability justice and activism movements ==
Activists and scholars such as Christine Wieseler, J. Logan Smilges, and Ashley Mog have helped normalize the term 'bodymind' and its understanding in relation to power structures, ableism, and activism. Christine Wieseler, a scholar and author of Epistemic Oppression and Ableism in Bioethics, uses the bodymind connection to elaborate on how privileging able bodies creates and perpetuates oppression. Wieseler notes that the disability justice movement is working to create a new rhetoric that reframes disabled bodymind connections in an inclusive way, particularly pivoting away from a frame of lack to a frame of valuing differentiation between bodies and minds. Ashley Mog is another prominent scholar and author of Discomforting Power: Bodies in Public. Mog analyzes the history of disability justice activism in the United States and highlights an array of first-person perspectives through the use of historical interviews with queer and trans disability justice activists. Mog believes that ableist power imbalances in the United States perpetrate the oppression of non-normative bodies. Furthermore, she expands on the ramifications of systemic oppression and illustrates its negative effects on individual and collective bodyminds that face consistent inaccessibility and otherism.

=== Twitter ===
In the 21st century, bodymind is being used as a colloquial term in disability activism conversations on social media platforms such as Twitter. J. Logan Smilges, an author and outspoken disability activist, provides a perspective on ableism's effect in society and states that "social media has helped popularize the language of disability activism, which is wonderful. But it has also warped the concept of ableism so that many disabled people mistake it as any inconvenience to their individual bodymind instead of recognizing it as a structure of power". Cathy Reisenwitz, an essayist and political activist, has also spoken out about the need for a shift in perspective towards bodyminds. Reisenwitz said that "the social model of disability locates the problem in the ableist society; there is nothing 'wrong' with a non-normative bodymind, rather there is something wrong with a world that refuses to accommodate it".

== See also ==
- Ableism
- Bodymind
- Developmental disability
- Disability and religion
- Disability culture
- Disability in the United States
- Disability rights movement
- Emotional or behavioral disability
- Inclusion (disability rights)
- Invisible disability
- List of disability studies journals
- Medical model of disability
- Services and supports for people with disabilities
- Sexuality and disability
- Social model of disability
- Society for Disability Studies
