= Conflicts of interest in academic publishing =

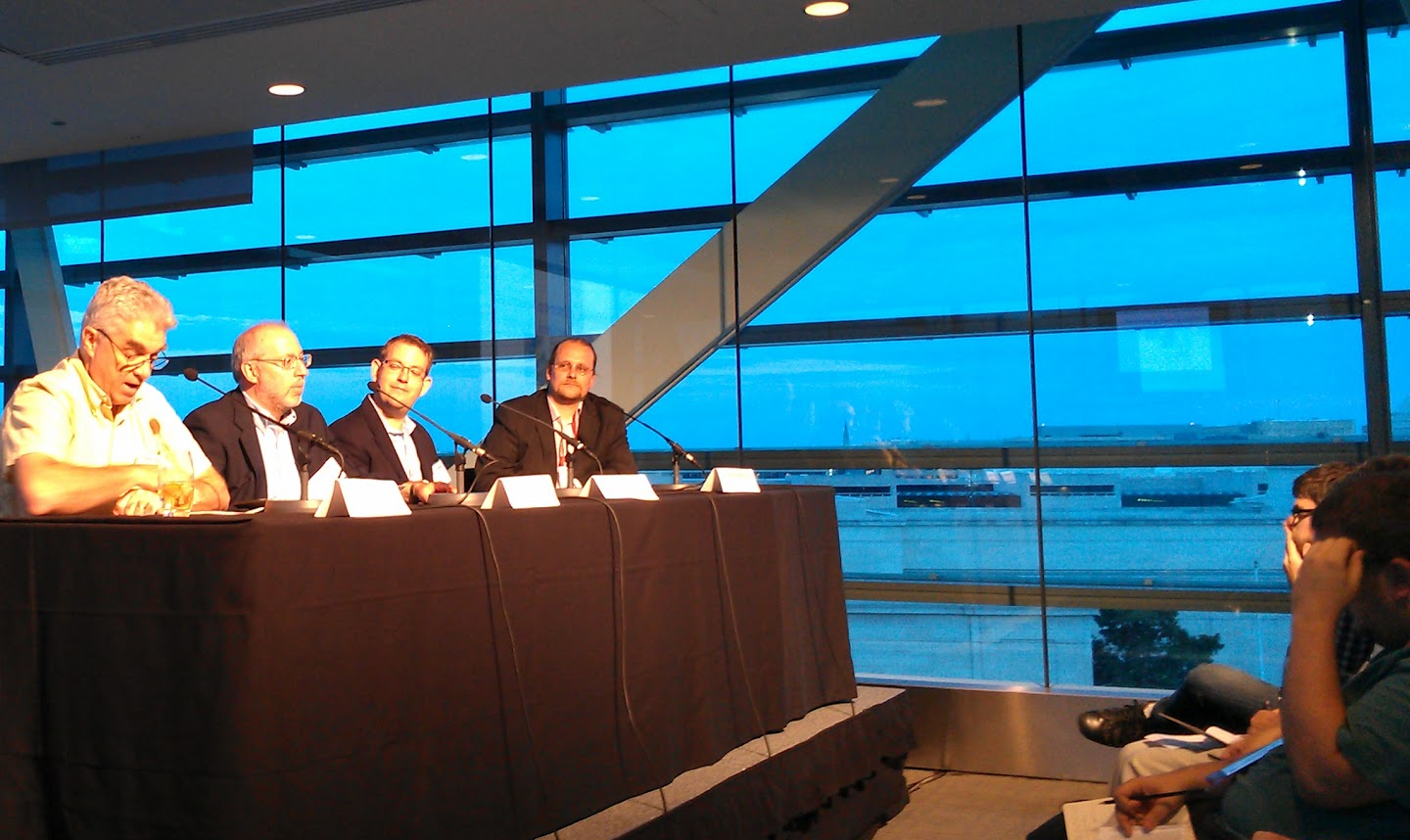
Conflicts of interest undermine the reliability of some academic journal articles cited on Wikipedia. The Sponsored Point of View panel discusses this problem in 2012

Conflicts of interest (COIs) often arise in academic publishing. Such conflicts may cast doubt on the credibility of an academic source. Ethical standards in academic publishing exist to avoid and deal with conflicts of interest, and the field continues to develop new standards. Standards vary between journals and are unevenly applied. According to the International Committee of Medical Journal Editors, "[a]uthors have a responsibility to evaluate the integrity, history, practices and reputation of the journals to which they submit manuscripts".

Conflicts of interest increase the likelihood of biases arising; they can harm the quality of research and the public good (even if disclosed). Conflicts of interest can involve research sponsors, authors, journals, journal staff, publishers, and peer reviewers.

== Avoidance, disclosure, and tracking ==
The avoidance of conflicts of interest and the changing of the structure of institutions to make them easier to avoid are frequently advocated for. Some institutional ethics policies ban academics from entering into specific types of COIs, for instance by prohibiting them from accepting gifts from companies connected with their work. Education in ethical COI management is also a tool for avoiding COI problems.

Disclosure of COIs has been debated since the 1980s; there is a general consensus favouring disclosure. There is also a view that COI concerns and some of the measures taken to reduce them are excessive.

Criticisms of disclosure policies include:

- authors disclosing COIs may feel pressured to present their research in a more biased manner to compensate;
- disclosure may discourage beneficial academic–industrial collaboration;
- disclosure may decrease public trust in research;
- researchers who have disclosed their COIs may feel license to behave immorally;
- disclosure may be taken as a sign of honesty or expertise and thus increase trust;
- some types of COI may be more likely than others to go unnoticed or unreported;
- awareness of a COI does not make people immune to being influenced by bias; generally, people do not sufficiently discount biased advice;
- disclosure discourages the judging of work purely on its merits;
- disclosure causes more intense scrutiny for wrongdoing.

While disclosure is widely favoured, other COI management measures have narrower support. Some publications hold the opinion that certain COIs disqualify people from certain research roles; for instance, that the testing of medicines should be done only by people who neither develop medicines nor are funded by their manufacturers.

Conflicts of interest have also been considered as a statistical factor confounding evidence, which must therefore be measured as accurately as possible and analysed, requiring machine-readable disclosure.

== Codes of conduct ==
Journals have individual ethics policies and codes of conduct; there are also some cross-journal voluntary standards.

The International Committee of Medical Journal Editors (ICMJE) publishes Recommendations for the Conduct, Reporting, Editing, and Publication of Scholarly work in Medical Journals, and a list of journals that pledge to follow it. The guideline lays down detailed rules for conflict-of-interest declaration by authors. It also says; "All participants in the peer-review and publication process—not only authors but also peer reviewers, editors, and editorial board members of journals—must consider their conflicts of interest when fulfilling their roles in the process of article review and publication and must disclose all relationships that could be viewed as potential conflicts of interest". These recommendations have been criticized and revised to remove loopholes allowing the non-disclosure of conflicts of interest.

The Council of Science Editors publishes a White Paper on publication ethics. Citing the ICMJE that "all participants in the peer-review and publication process must disclose all relationships that could be viewed as potential conflicts of interest", it highly recommends COI disclosure for sponsors, authors, reviewers, journals, and editorial staff.

The Good Publication Practice (GPP) guidelines, covering industry-sponsored medical research, are published by the International Society of Medical Publication Professionals.

The Committee on Publication Ethics (COPE) publishes a code of conduct stating, "[t]here must be clear definitions of conflicts of interest and processes for handling conflicts of interest of authors, reviewers, editors, journals and publishers, whether identified before or after publication".

The Open Access Scholarly Publishers Association's Principles of Transparency and Best Practice in Scholarly Publishing is intended to separate legitimate journals from predatory publishers and defines a minimal standard; clear and clearly stated COI policies.

A 2009 US Institute of Medicine report on medical COIs states that conflict-of-interest policies should be judged on their proportionality, transparency, accountability, and fairness; they should be effective, efficient, and targeted, known and understood, clearly identify who is responsible for monitoring, enforcement, and amendment, and apply equally to everyone involved. Review by conflict-of-interest committees is also recommended, and the lack of transparency and COI declaration in developing COI guidelines criticized.

As of 2015, journal COI policies often have no enforcement provisions. COI disclosure obligations have been legislated; one example of such legislation is the US Physician Payments Sunshine Act, but these laws do not apply specifically to journals.

== COIs by agent ==
=== COIs of journals ===
Journals are often not transparent about their institutional COIs, and do not apply the same disclosure standards to themselves as they do to their authors. Four out of six major general medical journals that were contacted for a 2010 COI study refused to provide information about the proportion of their income that derived from advertisements, reprints, and industry-supported supplements, citing policies on non-disclosure of financial information.

==== Owners and governing bodies ====
The owner of an academic journal has ultimate power over the hiring and firing of editorial staff; editors' interests in pleasing their employers conflict with some of their other editorial interests. Journals are also more likely to accept papers by authors who work for the journals' hosting institutions.

Some journals are owned by publishers. When journals print reviews of books published by their own publishers, they rarely (as of 2013) add COI disclosures. The publishers' interest in maximizing profit will often conflict with academic interests or ethical standards. In the case of closed-access publications, publishers' desire for high subscription income may conflict with an editorial desire for broader access and readership. There have been multiple mass resignations of editorial boards over such conflicts, which are often followed by the editorial board founding a new, non-profit journal to compete with their former one.

Some journals are owned by academic societies and professional organisations. Leading journals can be very profitable and there is often friction about revenue between the journal and the member society that owns it. Some academic societies and professional organisations are themselves funded by membership fees and/or donations. If the owners benefit financially from donations, the journal has a conflict between its financial interest in satisfying the donors—and therefore the owners—and its journalistic interests. Such COIs with industry donors have drawn criticism.

==== Reprints ====
A reprint is a copy of an individual article that is printed and sold as a separate product by the journal or its publisher or agent. Reprints are often used in pharmaceutical marketing and other medical marketing of products to doctors. This gives journals an incentive to produce good marketing material. Journals sell reprints at very high profit margins, often around 70%, as of 2010. A journal may sell a million dollars' worth of reprints of a single article if, for example, it is a large industry-funded clinical trial. The selling of reprints can bring in over 40% of a journal's income.

==== Impact factors, reputation, and subscriptions ====
If a journal is accused of managing COIs badly, its reputation is harmed.

The impact factor of a journal is often used to rate it, although this practice is widely criticized. A journal will generally want to increase its impact factor in hope of gaining more subscriptions, better submissions, and more prestige. As of 2010, industry-funded papers generally get cited more than others; this is probably due in part to industry-paid publicity.

Some journals engage in coercive citation, in which an editor forces an author to add extraneous citations to an article to inflate the impact factor of the journal in which the extraneous papers were published. A survey found that 86% of academics consider coercive citation unethical but 20% have experienced it. Journals appear to preferentially target younger authors and authors from non-English-speaking countries. Journals published by for-profit companies used coercive citation more than those published by university presses.

Journals may find it difficult to correct and retract erroneous papers after publication because of legal threats.

==== Advertising ====
Many academic journals contain advertising. The portion of a journal's revenue coming from advertising varies widely, according to one small study, from over 50% to 1%. As of 2010, advertising revenues for academic journals are generally falling. A 1995 survey of North American journal editors found that 57% felt responsible for the honesty of the pharmaceutical advertisements they ran and 40% supported peer-review of such advertisements. An interest in increasing advertising revenue can conflict with interests in journalistic independence and truthfulness.

==== Sponsored supplements ====
A poster urging researchers avoid predatory publishers

As of 2002, some journals publish supplements that often either cover an industry-funded conference or are "symposia" on a given topic. These supplements are often subsidized by an external sponsor with a financial interest in the outcome of research in that field; for instance, a drug manufacturer or food industry group. Such supplements can have guest editors, are often not peer-reviewed to the same standard as the journal itself, and are more likely to use promotional language. Many journals do not publish sponsored supplements. Small-circulation journals are more likely to publish supplements than large, high-prestige journals. Indications that an article was published in a supplement may be fairly subtle; for instance, a letter "s" added to a page number.

The ICMJE code of conduct specifically addresses guest-editor COIs; "Editors should publish regular disclosure statements about potential conflicts of interests related to their own commitments and those of their journal staff. Guest editors should follow these same procedures." It also states that the usual journal editor must maintain full control and responsibility and that "Editing by the funding organization should not be permitted".

The US Food and Drug Administration states that supplement articles should not be used as medical-marketing reprints, but as of 2009 it had no legal authority to prohibit the practice.

==== Publishers ====
Publishers may not be strongly motivated to ensure the quality of their journals. In the Australasian Journal of Bone & Joint Medicine case, the printer Elsevier Australia put out six journal-like publications containing articles about drugs made by the Merck Group, which paid for and controlled the publications.

=== COIs of journal staff ===
Personal conflicts of interest faced by journal staff are individual. If a person leaves the journal—unlike the COIs of journals as institutions—their personal COIs will go with them.

As of 2015, COIs of journal staff are less commonly reported than those of authors. For instance, one 2009 World Association of Medical Editors (WAME) policy document states, "Some journals list editors' competing interests on their website but this is not a standard practice". The ICMJE, however, requires that the COIs of editors and journal staff be regularly declared and published.

One 2017 Open Payments study of influential US medical journals found half of the editors received payments from industry; another study that used a different sample of editors reported two-thirds. As of 2002, systems for reporting wrongdoing by editors often do not exist.

Many journals have policies limiting COIs staff can enter into; for instance, accepting gifts of travel, accommodation, or hospitality may be prohibited. As of 2016, such policies are rarely published. Most journals do not offer COI training; as of 2015, many journals report a desire for better guidance on COI policy.

=== COIs of peer reviewers ===
The ICJME recommendations require peer reviewers to disclose conflicts of interest. Half to two-thirds of journals, depending on subject area, did not follow this recommendation in the first two decades of the 21st century. As of 2017, if a peer reviewer fails to disclose a conflict of interest, the paper will generally not be withdrawn, corrected, or re-reviewed; the reviews, however, may be reassessed.

A 2024 study published in JAMA found that 58.9% of U.S.-based peer reviewers for leading medical journals (The BMJ, JAMA, The Lancet, and The New England Journal of Medicine) received payments from drug and medical device manufacturers between 2020 and 2022. These payments totaled $1.06 billion, mostly for research purposes, though a notable portion ($64.18 million) was for general payments such as consulting and speaking fees. As such, industry payments to reviewers were common and often substantial. Most journals do not require peer reviewers to publicly disclose industry payments.

If peer reviewers are anonymous, their COIs with reviewed articles cannot be directly established. Some experiments with publishing the names of reviewers have been undertaken; in others, the identities of reviewers were disclosed to authors, allowing authors to identify COIs. Some journals now have an open review process in which everything, including the peer reviews and the names of the reviewers, and editor and author comment, is published transparently online.

The duties of peer review may conflict with social interests or institutional loyalties; to avoid such COIs, reviewers may be excluded if they have some forms of COI, such as having collaborated with the author.

Readers of academic papers may spot errors, informally or as part of formal post-publication peer review. Academics submitting corrections to papers are often asked by the publishers to pay over 1,000 US dollars for the publication of their corrections.

=== COIs of article authors ===
Authors of individual papers may face conflicts with their duty to report truthfully and impartially. Financial, career, political, and social interests are all sources of conflict. Authors' institutional interests become sources of conflict when the research might harm the institution's finances or offend the author's superiors.

Many journals require authors to self-declare their conflicts of interest when submitting a paper; they also ask specific questions about conflicts of interest. The questions vary substantially between journals. Author declarations, however, are rarely verified by the journal. As of 2018, "most editors say it's not their job to make sure authors reveal financial conflicts, and there are no repercussions for those who don't". Even if a conflict of interest is reported by a reader after publication, COPE does not suggest independent investigation, as of 2017.

As a result, as of 2018, authors often fail to declare their conflicts of interest. Rates of nondisclosure vary widely in reported studies.

The COPE retraction guidelines state, "Retractions are also used to alert readers to ... failure to disclose a major competing interest likely to influence interpretations or recommendations". As of 2018, however, if an author fails to disclose a COI, the paper will usually be corrected; it will not usually be retracted. Paper retractions, notifications to superiors, and publication bans are possible. Non-disclosure incidents harm academic careers. Authors are held to have collective responsibility for the contents of an article; if one author fails to declare a conflict of interest, the peer review process may be deemed compromised and the whole paper retracted.

The publisher may charge authors substantial fees for retracting papers, even in cases of honest error, giving them a financial disincentive to correct the record.

Public registries of author COIs have been suggested. Authors face administrative burdens in declaring COIs; standardized declarations or a registry could reduce these.

==== Ghost authors and non-contributing authors ====
Ghost authorship, where a writer contributes but is not credited, has been estimated to affect a significant proportion of the research literature. Honorary authorship, where an author is credited but did not contribute, is more common. Being named as an author on many papers is good for an academic's career. Failure to adhere to authorship standards is rarely punished. To avoid misreported authorship, a requirement that all authors describe the contribution they made to the study ("movie-style credits") has been advocated for. Ghostwriters may be legally liable for fraud.

The ICMJE criteria for authorship require that authors contribute:

- Substantial contributions to the conception or design of the work; or the acquisition, analysis, or interpretation of data for the work; and
- Drafting the work or revising it critically for important intellectual content; and
- Final approval of the version to be published; and
- Agreement to be accountable for all aspects of the work in ensuring that questions related to the accuracy or integrity of any part of the work are appropriately investigated and resolved.

The ICMJE requires that "All those designated as authors should meet all four criteria for authorship, and all who meet the four criteria should be identified as authors. Those who do not meet all four criteria should be acknowledged." Academics who have had publication ethics training and those who are aware of the ICMJE authorship criteria are more stringent in their concepts of authorship and are more likely to consider breaches of authorship as misconduct, as are more junior researchers. Awareness is low; one study found only about half of researchers had read the ICJME criteria.

=== COIs of study sponsors ===
If a study requires outside funding, this can be a major source of conflicting interests; for instance in cases where the manufacturer of a drug is funding a study into its safety and efficacy or where the sponsor hopes to use the research to defend itself in litigation. Sponsors of a study may involve themselves in the design, execution, analysis, and write-up of a study. In extreme cases, they may carry out the research and ghostwrite the article with almost no involvement from the nominal author. Movie-style credits are advocated as a way to avoid this.

There are many opportunities for bias in trial design and trial reporting. For instance, a trial that compares a drug against the wrong dose of a competing drug may produce spuriously positive results.

In some cases, a contract with a sponsor may mean those named as investigators and authors on the papers may not have access to the trial data, control over the publication text, or the freedom to talk about their work. While authors and institutions have an interest in avoiding such contracts, it conflicts with their interest in competing for funding from potential study sponsors. Institutions that set stricter ethical standards for sponsor contracts lose contracts and funding when sponsors go elsewhere.

Sponsors have required contractual promises that the study is not reported without the sponsor's approval (gag clauses) and some have sued authors over compliance. Trials may go unpublished to keep commercial information secret or because the trial results were unfavourable. Some journals require that human trials be registered to be considered for publication; some require the declaration of any gag clauses as a conflict of interest; since 2001, some also require a statement that the authors have not agreed to a gag clause. Some journals require a promise to provide access to the original data to researchers intending to replicate the work. Some research ethics boards, universities, and national laws prohibit gag clauses. Gag clauses may not be legally enforceable if compliance would cause sufficient public harm. Non-publication has been found to be more common in industry-funded trials, contributing to publication bias.

It has been suggested that having many sponsors with different interests protects against COI-induced bias. As of 2006, there was no evidence for or against this hypothesis.

== Effect on conclusions of research ==
There is evidence that industry funding of studies of medical devices and drugs results in these studies having more positive conclusions regarding efficacy (funding bias). A similar relationship has been found in clinical trials of surgical interventions, where industry funding leads to researchers exaggerating the positive nature of their findings. Not all studies have found a statistically significant relationship between industry funding and the study outcome.

== Interests of research participants ==
Chronically ill medical research participants report expectation of being told about COIs and some report they would not participate if the researcher had some sorts of COIs. With few exceptions, multiple ethical guidelines forbid researchers with a financial interest in the outcome from being involved in human trials.

The consent agreements entered into with study participants may be legally binding on the academics but not on the sponsor, unless the sponsor has a contractual commitment saying otherwise.

Ethical rules, including the Declaration of Helsinki, require the publication of results of human trials. participants in which are often motivated by a desire to improve medical knowledge. Patients may be harmed if safety data, such risks to patients, are kept secret. Duties to human-research participants can therefore conflict with interests in non-publication such as gag clauses.

== Publication of COI declarations ==
Some journals place COI declarations at the beginning of an article but most put it in smaller print at the end. Positioning makes a difference; if readers feel they are being manipulated from the beginning of a text, they read more critically than if the same feeling is produced at the end of a text.

According to the ICMJE, "each journal should develop standards with regard to the form the [COI] information should take and where it will be posted". It is often placed after the body of the article, just before the reference section. Some COI statements, like those of anonymous reviewers, may not be published at all. COI statements are sometimes paywalled so they are only visible to those who have paid for full text access. This is not considered ethical by the Committee on Publication Ethics.

In 2017 PubMed began including COI statements at the end of the abstract and before the body of the article after receiving complaints that because COI declarations were only included in full article texts, they often went unseen in paywalled articles. Only COI statements that are appropriately formatted and tagged by the publisher are included.

Science journalism rarely reports COI information from the academic article reported upon; in some studies, fewer than 1% of stories included COI information.

== False statements of COIs ==
Failure to disclose a conflict of interest may, depending on the circumstances, be considered a form of corruption or academic misconduct.

== See also ==
- Academic authorship
- Metascience
- Research Integrity Risk Index
