= Eli Clare =

American activist and writer (born 1963)

- Born: 1963 (age 62–63); Coos Bay, Oregon, U.S.
- Education: Mills College (1985); Goddard College (MFA, 1993)

Eli Clare (born 1963) is an American writer, activist, educator, and speaker. His work focuses on queer, transgender, and disability issues. Clare was one of the first scholars to popularize the bodymind concept.

== Early life and education ==
Clare was born in Coos Bay in 1963 and grew up in Port Orford, Oregon. He attended Reed College before transferring to Mills College where he received a degree in women's studies in 1985. Clare earned an M.F.A. degree in creative writing from Goddard College in 1993.

== Career ==
Eli Clare coordinated a rape prevention program, and helped organize the first Queerness and Disability Conference in 2002.

His work is associated with the second wave of the disability rights movement and disability justice.

Clare has received a number of awards for his work, including the Creating Change Award from the National Gay and Lesbian Task Force and LGBT Artist of the Year from Michigan Pride. In 2018, Clare received the Richard L. Schlegel Award for visionary LGBTQ leadership from American University. That year, his book Brilliant Imperfection won the Randy Shilts Award for Gay Nonfiction from Publishing Triangle. In 2019, he was awarded a Disability Futures Fellowship by the Ford Foundation and the Andrew W. Mellon Foundation.

Clare was a visiting scholar at the University at Buffalo's Center for Diversity Innovation for the 2020–2021 academic year. He is also on the advisory board for the Disability Project, housed under the Transgender Law Center, the largest national trans-led organization.

In 2025, Clare was awarded Yale University's James Robert Brudner Memorial Prize.

=== Bodymind ===
Eli Clare is one of the first scholars to popularize the concept of bodymind. Along with Margaret Price, Clare proposed that the bodymind expresses the interrelatedness of mental and physical processes. Clare uses bodymind in his work Brilliant Imperfection as a way to resist common Western assumptions that the body and mind are separate entities, or that the mind is "superior" to the body.

Other prominent scholars to theorize on bodymind include Price, Sami Schalk, Gloria Anzaldua, and Alyson Patsavas.

== Publications ==
Eli Clare has published two books of creative non-fiction, Exile and Pride: Disability, Queerness, and Liberation (1999, 2009, 2015) and Brilliant Imperfection: Grappling with Cure (2017); a collection of poetry, The Marrow's Telling: Words in Motion (2007); and contributed to a number of periodicals and anthologies.

Clare's scholarly work has been published in Public Culture, GLQ: A Journal of Lesbian and Gay Studies, Seattle Journal for Social Justice, Journal of Literary & Cultural Disability Studies, Tikkun, and Disability Studies Quarterly.

Clare has also submitted chapters to the following anthologies: Gender and Women's Studies in Canada: Critical Terrain, the fourth edition of The Disability Studies Reader, Disability Studies and the Environmental Humanities: Toward an Eco-Crip Theory, Material Ecocriticism, The Blackwell Guide to Feminist Philosophy, Staring Back: The Disability Experience from the Inside Out, Queerly Classed, Unruly Bodies: Life Writing by Women with Disabilities, and Queer Crips: Disabled Gay Men and Their Stories.

Queerly Classed is a collection of essays discussing the intersections of class background, social status, and "queerness", to which Clare contributed the essay "Losing Home". The anthology won the Lambda Literary Award for Lesbian Studies and was a finalist for the Stonewall Book Awards' Israel Fishman Nonfiction Award.

Queer Crips: Disabled Gay Men and Their Stories is a collection of personal stories from gay men with disabilities edited by Bob Guter and John R. Killacky. To this anthology, Eli Clare submitted "Gawking, Gaping, Staring". The book won the 2004 Lambda Literary Award for the Anthologies/Non-fiction category.

Clare's poems and essays have been published in Sojourner: The Women's Forum, Sinister Wisdom, Cultural Activisms: Political Voices, Poetic Voices, Points of Contact: Disability, Art, and Culture, and The Arc of Love: An Anthology of Lesbian Love Poems.

=== Exile and Pride: Disability, Queerness, and Liberation ===
Exile and Pride: Disability, Queerness, and Liberation is an autobiographical collection of essays first published by South End Press in 1999 and 2009 and republished by Duke University Press in 2015. Exile and Pride's expanded edition, published in 2009, was a finalist for Foreword's 2009 INDIES Book of the Year Award. The 2015 edition includes a foreword by Aurora Levins Morales and an afterword by Dean Spade.

Exile and Pride discusses Clare's experiences as a "white disabled genderqueer activist/writer" and explores the meaning of "home" through autobiographical narratives while covering the topics of oppression, power, resistance, environmental destruction, capitalism, sexuality, institutional violence, gender, and social justice more generally.

=== The Marrow's Telling: Words in Motion ===
The Marrow's Telling: Words in Motion is a collection of poetry published by Homofactus Press in 2007, though many of the poems had been previously published. The collection was a Lambda Literary Award finalist in 2007.

In this work, Eli Clare "explores how bodies carry history and identity over time". The poems include contradiction and repetition as they discuss the themes of disability, race, gender, violence, and sexuality.

=== Brilliant Imperfection: Grappling with Cure ===
Brilliant Imperfection: Grappling with Cure was published by Duke University Press in 2017. In 2018, Brilliant Imperfection won the Publishing Triangle's Randy Shilts Award for Gay Nonfiction.

In Brilliant Imperfection, Eli Clare explores the concept of cure, "the deeply held belief that body-minds considered broken need to be fixed," while using memoir, history, and critical analysis to discuss the intersectionality of race, disability, sexuality, class, and gender, as well as environmental politics. Clare is one of the first scholars to popularize the concept of bodymind, which he uses in Brilliant Imperfection as a way to resist common Western assumptions that the body and mind are separate entities or that the mind is "superior" to the body.

=== Unfurl: Survivals, Sorrows, and Dreaming ===
Unfurl: Survivals, Sorrows, and Dreaming was published by Duke University Press in 2025. It is a combination of poetry and creative nonfiction, described by the publisher as a "queer disabled love song to trees and beavers, tremors and dreams."

== Personal life ==
Eli Clare has cerebral palsy. He is genderqueer and a trans man.

As of 2018, he lived near Lake Champlain in Vermont.

== See also ==
- Medical industrial complex
- Disability Studies
- Social model of disability
