= Postural Integration =

Type of bodywork

Postural Integration is a type of bodywork purporting to draw on "energy" and allow access to the past. It was devised in the late 1960s by Jack Painter (1933–2010) in California, US, after exploration in the fields of humanistic psychology and the human potential movement.

== Definition ==
According to Quackwatch, Postural Integration is "a form of bodywork that is an alleged access to the past and a purported means of: (a) releasing and integrating 'energy', and (b) finding a 'light, joyful balance' with 'mother earth'".

== Background ==
During his time as Professor of Philosophy at the University of Miami, Painter became interested in working with the body and personally explored many different approaches – massage, acupuncture, Zen, yoga, the work of Ida Rolf and her Rolfing method, Gestalt therapy developed by Fritz Perls, and the theories of Wilhelm Reich in the form of Vegetotherapy.

By the seventies he was calling his form of holistic bodymind bodywork 'Postural Integration'. In the eighties and nineties Painter then went on to develop two further methods, Energetic Integration and Pelvic-Heart Integration.

== In practise ==
In the course of a twelve-session series modeled loosely on Rolfing Structural Integration, the Postural Integration process integrates Gestalt therapy with bodywork, as well as breath work, fine energy work and elements from the Five Phases system. The initial seven sessions address specific body areas and focus on releasing defensive armoring habits, characterized as "letting go of the old self". During sessions, spontaneous emotional expression is encouraged. Additional tools include drama therapy, attention to body language and self-awareness.

Since Postural Integration works simultaneously with the physical, mental and emotional aspects of the whole person, it contains elements of both psychotherapy and bodywork, some practitioners qualified in psychotherapy focus more on the therapy aspect while others use it primarily as a form of bodywork with psychotherapy-based awareness and insights.

Postural Integration is taught and practised mainly in Europe, and also in the US, Mexico and South Africa.

Postural Integration trainings are organized by the International Council of PsychoCorporal (Bodymind) Integration Trainers (ICPIT).

In the 1990s Psychotherapeutic Postural Integrational (PPI) developed in Strasbourg, France out of Postural Integration with the inclusion of Jungian psychology and Gestalt therapy, the institute accredited by the European Association for Body Psychotherapy as qualifying their students in this method as ECP practitioners of psychotherapy.

== See also ==
- Alternative medicine
- Posture (psychology)
- Somatic psychology
