= Conflict of interest in the healthcare industry =

Conflict of interest in the health care industry occurs when the primary goal of protecting and increasing the health of patients comes into conflict with any other secondary goal, especially personal gain to healthcare professionals, and increasing revenue to a healthcare organization from selling health care products and services. The public and private sectors of the medical–industrial complex have various conflicts of interest which are specific to these entities.

== Trends ==
There is a lack of empirical evidence to describe the impact of conflict of interest in the health care industry.

Business interests influence the direction of cancer research and the adoption of new practices in therapy.

University projects which receive industry funding are more likely to produce research outcomes which favor their funders.

A 2017 systematic review by the Cochrane Collaboration found that pharmaceutical and medical device industry sponsored studies are more often favorable to the sponsor's product compared with studies with other sources of sponsorship.

The trend toward treating clinical research as a business has coincided with a range of problems which are likely the result of business connections.

Funders seek and court scientists to author papers and lend their person reputations to add credibility to research findings.

Physicians in general practice also face potential conflicts of interest. For example, the Physician Payments Sunshine Act of 2010 requires that financial relationships of physicians and teaching hospitals with manufacturers be reported and made publicly available via the Open Payments Program website.

Using this Open Payments database, it was found that about 64% of US-based physician-editors of highly cited medical journals received industry-associated payments (i.e., payments from medical drug and device companies) during a period spanning August 1, 2013 to December 31, 2016. Medical journals have varying requirements what should be published and people who fail to follow them face few repercussions.

The medical–industrial complex describes the conflict of interest present between physicians and the healthcare industry. Physicians who invest in medical device companies may be biased towards certain medical devices or treatments, creating a conflict of interest between doing what is best for a patient versus what is in their best financial interest. Conflict of interest in continuing medical education is also present, where physicians learn how to use certain medical devices during their board-certification courses that affect their patients.
