= Mad at School =

2011 non-fiction book by Margaret Price

- Author: Margaret Price
- Publisher: University of Michigan Press
- Publication date: February 2011
- ISBN: 978-0-472-07138-8

Mad at School: Rhetorics of Mental Disability and Academic Life is a 2011 non-fiction book by American academic Margaret Price.

== Contents ==
- "Foreword" by American disability studies theorist Tobin Siebers
- "Introduction"
- "Listening to the Subject of Mental Disability: Intersections of Academic and Medical Discourses"
- "Ways to Move: Presence, Participation, and Resistance in Kairotic Space"
- "The Essential Functions of the Position: Collegiality and Productivity"
- "Assaults on the Ivory Tower: Representations of Madness in the Discourse of U.S. School Shootings"
- "'Her Pronouns Wax and Wane'" Mental Disability, Autobiography, and Counter-Diagnosis"
- "In/ter/dependent Scholarship", with Leah (Phinnia) Meredith, Cal Montgomery, and Tynan Power
