= Bodymind =

Academic concept

Bodymind is an approach to understanding the relationship between the human body and mind in which they are seen as a single integrated unit. It attempts to address the mind–body problem and resists the Western traditions of mind–body dualism.

== In philosophy ==
In the field of philosophy, dualism is the view that human minds and bodies are different entities that can be understood separately. This paradigm solidified in the Western world during the Enlightenment, and is associated with the work of René Descartes, among others. Despite the influence of the dualist model, empirical support for the relationship between mental illness and physical changes in the brain has been documented since the 17th century.

Holism is the position that the body and mind are one integrated system. As a term for that system, bodymind emphasizes the inextricability of consciousness, cognition, and the body's physical processes.

== In neuroscience ==
The emergence of neural imaging techniques has reframed the mind-body debate to incorporate theories from both philosophy and neuroscience. Researchers such as Candace Pert have posited a neurophysiological basis for emotions and their foundation in human meaning-making and mental function.

== Relevance to alternative medicine ==
In the field of alternative medicine, bodymind implies that

- The body, mind, emotions, and spirit are dynamically interrelated.
- Experience, including physical stress, emotional injury, and pleasures are stored in the body's cells which in turn affects one's reactions to stimuli.

The term can be a number of disciplines, including:

- Psychoneuroimmunology, the study of the interaction between psychological processes and the nervous and immune systems of the human body.
- Body psychotherapy, a branch of psychotherapy which applies basic principles of somatic psychology. It originated in the work of Pierre Janet and particularly Wilhelm Reich.
- Neurobiology, the study of the nervous system
- Psychosomatic medicine, an interdisciplinary medical field exploring the relationships among social, psychological, and behavioral factors on bodily processes and quality of life in humans and animals. Clinical situations where mental processes act as a major factor affecting medical outcomes are areas where psychosomatic medicine excels.
- Postural Integration, a process-oriented body psychotherapy originally developed in the late 1960s by Jack Painter (1933–2010) in California, US, after exploration in the fields of humanistic psychology and the human potential movement. The method aims to support personal change and self development, through a particular form of manipulative holistic bodywork.

== See also ==
- Ableism
- Binding problem
- Bodymind (disability studies)
- Developmental disability
- Disability
- Disability and religion
- Disability culture
- Disability in the United States
- Disability rights
- Disability studies
- Emotional or behavioral disability
- Inclusion (disability rights)
- Invisible disability
- List of disability studies journals
- Medical model of disability
- Services for the disabled
- Sexuality and disability
- Social model of disability
- Society for Disability Studies
