= Australasian Journal of Bone & Joint Medicine =

- Discipline: Orthopedics
- Language: English

Publication details
- History: 2002–2005
- Publisher: Excerpta Medica Communications (Australia)

Standard abbreviations
- ISO 4: Australas. J. Bone Jt. Med.

Indexing
- ISSN: 1447-5529
- OCLC no.: 223430052

The Australasian Journal of Bone & Joint Medicine (originally titled the Australasian Journal of Musculoskeletal Medicine) was a periodical presented in the style of a scientific journal, published by Elsevier but established and funded by pharmaceutical company Merck. Publication began in 2002, and the last issue appeared in 2005. According to The Scientist:

Merck paid an undisclosed sum to Elsevier to produce several volumes of [Australasian Journal of Bone and Joint Medicine], a publication that had the look of a peer-reviewed medical journal, but contained only reprinted or summarized articles—most of which presented data favorable to Merck products—that appeared to act solely as marketing tools with no disclosure of company sponsorship.

The publication was not included in the MEDLINE literature database and did not have its own website.

In May 2009, Elsevier admitted that a series of similar industry sponsored publications had been produced, and that "high standards for disclosure were not followed in this instance". In a formal statement, the CEO of Elsevier's Health Sciences Division, Michael Hansen, admitted that the practice was "unacceptable", and expressed regret for the publications. Merck has denied claims that articles within it were ghost written by Merck and has stated that the articles were all reprinted from peer-reviewed medical journals.

Several medical experts stated that their names were included in the Honorary Editorial Board of the Australasian Journal of Bone and Joint Medicine without their knowledge and consent.

There were six such "industry-sponsored" publications brought out by Elsevier without proper disclosure of their nature, and which had the superficial appearance of a legitimate independent journal. The six publications involved were:

- Australasian Journal of General Practice
- Australasian Journal of Neurology
- Australasian Journal of Cardiology
- Australasian Journal of Clinical Pharmacy
- Australasian Journal of Cardiovascular Medicine
- Australasian Journal of Bone & Joint Medicine

== See also ==
- Academic dishonesty
- Elsevier § Fake journals
- Vioxx
