= Structural competency =

Jonathan Metzl, an American psychiatrist, professor, and writer, and Helena Hansen, an American psychiatrist, professor, and anthropologist wrote the article, “Structural competency: Theorizing a new medical engagement with stigma and inequality” in which this definition of structural competency was developed. Metzl and Hansen describe medical structural competency as a “trained ability to discern how a host of issues” including social determinants define “symptoms, attitude, or attitudes” that patients may possess impact treatment. Both, alongside other structural competence advocates believe that structural competency is integral to the training of physicians in their service to others as oftentimes, social determinants of health issues are overlooked as the sources of problems. Instead blame is typically put on the individual for their contribution to their own poor health.

== History ==
Structural competency emerged from the term "cultural competence". "Cultural competence" emerged in the 1980s and continues to be used in medicine to acknowledge the differences in perception of health that may exist between patients and healthcare professionals of different backgrounds. Such differences may include beliefs about healthcare, attitudes toward certain diseases or treatments, or language barriers. Metzl and Hansen assert that while this term addresses individual differences and how to navigate them in the clinical setting, it does not adequately address the systemic disparities at play that influence health outcomes beyond the hospital. They coined the term “structural competency” more recently in 2014 to specifically address the systemic barriers that prevent people of different socio-cultural backgrounds from accessing healthcare needs.

Metzl and Hansen use the word “structure” in both the literal sense, describing infrastructure and resource distribution systems, as well as the broader administrative definition. They use “competency” to describe the ongoing consideration of structural barriers that impact patients, rather than a false sense of understanding by providers.

Katerina Melino, a member of the Psychiatric Mental Health Nurse Practitioner Program at the UCSF School of Nursing, states that while structural competency is not yet acknowledged at the policy level, it may be implemented at the following levels of practice within the medical institution: intrapersonal, interpersonal, clinical, and community. At the intrapersonal level, healthcare professionals can engage in self reflection about their own identities and positions and where they stand in comparison to patients. At the interpersonal level, healthcare professionals can approach patients and ask them about specific socio-economic factors that may affect their health including income, education, and legal status. More broadly, at the level of the clinical institution, hospitals and clinics can hire staff with diverse lived experiences, and offer educational training programs. At the community level, healthcare professionals can work with professionals in different fields, especially legal professionals, to help patients overcome socio-economic barriers such as housing and food access.

=== Structural vs cultural competency ===
Structural competency oftentimes gets confused with the term cultural competence. Cultural competence in the medical industrial complex is understood as the “capacity of the healthcare system to improve the health of consumers by integrating culture into the delivery of health services.”

From another perspective, cultural competency reinforces biases, stereotypes, and misconceptions within the medical industrial complex towards patients in attempts to be ‘culturally sensitive’. Rather than examining the root of institutionalized issues that call for measures of cultural competence, training physicians to be culturally sensitive presumes the conditions and experiences of the patients they treat without a true acknowledgement or recognition of why the cultural competence is needed in the first place. The focus is put on how to treat an illness rather than why the illness is present.

== Core principles ==
Metzl and Hansen describe five core principles of structural competency:

1. Recognition of "structures that shape clinical interactions"
2. Development of "an extra-clinical language of structure"
3. Re-articulation of "'cultural' presentations in structural terms"
4. Observation and imagination of "structural intervention"
5. Development of "structural humility"

They emphasize the need for structural competency to be incorporated into medical training so that clinical providers are able to recognize how their interactions with patients are shaped by structural contexts, and are therefore able to treat individuals with a greater understanding of patient needs. Metzl and Hansen reference Stokely Carmichael on institutionalized racism as a less identifiable but equally destructive form of racism.

=== Recognizing the structures that shape clinical interactions ===
Metzl and Hansen present a situation in which an African-American patient in her mid-60s refused to take her prescribed medications. Rather than confront the patient about her refusal and attitude towards medications, this first core competency would encourage practitioners to investigate pricing of the medication, if it is generic or name-brand, where her prescription is filled, etc. Although healthcare providers have little control over these issues, approaching patient care with an understanding of patient contexts can help create constructive dialogue and care.

=== Developing an extra-clinical language of structure ===
Understanding how health disparities function as a result of privilege within certain communities and physiological responses to stressors such as racism in marginalized communities is a critical part of medical care. Interdisciplinary study of these issues is vital to a structural competency approach. With this principle, Metzl and Hansen encourage educational systems to incorporate discussion of structural impacts on health outcomes and interactions.

=== Re-articulating “cultural” presentations in structural terms ===
Once this extra-clinical language has been established, application to clinical settings is next. Structural understanding and language should build on cultural understanding, but it is also a better alternative because cultural competency requires a familiarity of healthcare providers with cultures. Articulating how the experiences of patients may be affected by structural issues can help providers gain perspective on their patients' contexts. For example, the aforementioned patient may be unable to pay for medications, or may not receive enough time with the doctor to understand their diagnosis and the proper mechanism of their medication, which may hinder their likelihood of taking the medication as prescribed. Rather than dismiss the patient as non-compliant, providers should conduct the work necessary to understand the patient's position and motivations.

=== Observing and imagining structural intervention ===
After recognizing the structural impacts on patient/doctor interactions and experiences, a structural intervention to address these impacts is required. For example, with the continued anecdote of the noncompliant patient: recognizing the main barriers to patient compliancy, such as lack of patient understanding of their diagnosis, can be used to formulate solutions such as increasing patient-doctor interaction, allowing misunderstandings to be addressed. Structural intervention should occur both on an individual scale, such as this example, but also on a community-oriented scale.

=== Developing structural humility ===
The final principle is what Metzl and Hansen call "structural humility": recognizing the limitations of structural competency and interventions. Removing bias entirely is impossible, but the steps listed seek to address structural disparities on an individual setting as much as possible.

== Application to clinical settings ==
Metzl and Hansen's work has led to attempts to incorporate structural competency into curricula aimed at healthcare professionals. Neff et al. rearranged the original five core principles into a list of five goals of a structural competence-focused curriculum. These goals, in order, consist of (1) identifying structural influences on patient health, (2) identifying structural influences on clinical interaction, (3) generating structural interventions in the clinic, (4) generating structural interventions beyond the clinic, and (5) applying structural humility.

== Connection between social determinants of health and structural competency ==
Social determinants of health (SDOH) are non-medical factors that significantly impact health outcomes. They encompass the conditions in which people are born, grow up, live, work, and age. These determinants create systems that affect opportunity and resource access necessary for maintaining good health. When these factors combine unfavorably, they create health inequities - unfair disparities resulting from unjust systems and practices that limit people's ability to achieve optimal health. SDOH significantly influence healthcare access and quality, as the inequitable distribution of these social and environmental factors leads directly to health disparities across different populations.

Understanding SDOH is incredibly important to ensure medical providers are providing the correct care for everybody, taking their non-medical context into consideration when providing medical care. A study that analyzed medical care Black populations receive throughout the US determined indices of (1) modifiable social determinants of health and (2) social determinant inequity. From this study, researchers determined that SDOH – where people live, their jobs, their family situations, and more – highly influence the medical care that they can access, and that they receive. Another study connects reproductive health to SDOH and applies the structural competency framework to reproductive healthcare. Yet another study connects SDOH and structural competency to emergency medicine. As seen in these studies and many others, structural competency aims to equalize medical access and care by incorporating knowledge of the SDOH patients come in with, and applying the tenets of structural competency to ensure that all patients receive equal, adequate, and complete care.

=== Connection and evolution to structural humility ===
Some scholars argue that we should change the name once again from structural competency to structural humility because ‘humility’ implies both understanding and acting on that understanding, while ‘competency’ implies ability to understand. Additionally, ‘humility’ calls for the medical provider to bring in other resources for their patient based on their SDOH, instead of only treating the medical issue.
