= Reprint =

Re-publishing of older material

A reprint is a re-publication of material that has already been previously published. The term reprint is used with slightly different meanings in several fields.

== Academic publishing ==
In academic publishing, offprints, sometimes also known as reprints, are bulk reproductions of individual articles previously published in academic journals. Offprints from scientific, technical, and medical (STM) journals are used by researchers in some fields to generate awareness among audiences who don't subscribe to the journal e.g. physicians, consumers, investors etc. They are usually ordered directly from the publisher of the journal. However, some third-party service providers also exist, serving as an intermediary that provides a single source of offprints from multiple publishers.

== Book publishing ==
In book publishing, if a reprint has been revised from an earlier version, it is usually referred to as a new edition rather than a reprint.

== Collectible card games ==
In collectible card games, a reprint is a card published in an earlier card set which is published again in a new card set. Often, the art on the card may be changed, or the text updated to reflect new errata.

== Comic books ==
Publishers will reprint classic comic books from years or even decades ago, often restoring the art with newer techniques. The reprints may be standalone comic books, compilation trade paperbacks, or back-ups in other comic books.

Comic books which sell out may be given a second (or more) printing in order to bring more copies to the distributor.

== Videotapes, DVDs and Blu-Ray ==
In the 20th-21st century, home media releases will reprint several vintage films.
