= Offprint =

Reproduction of a single article, chapter, or paper from a larger publication

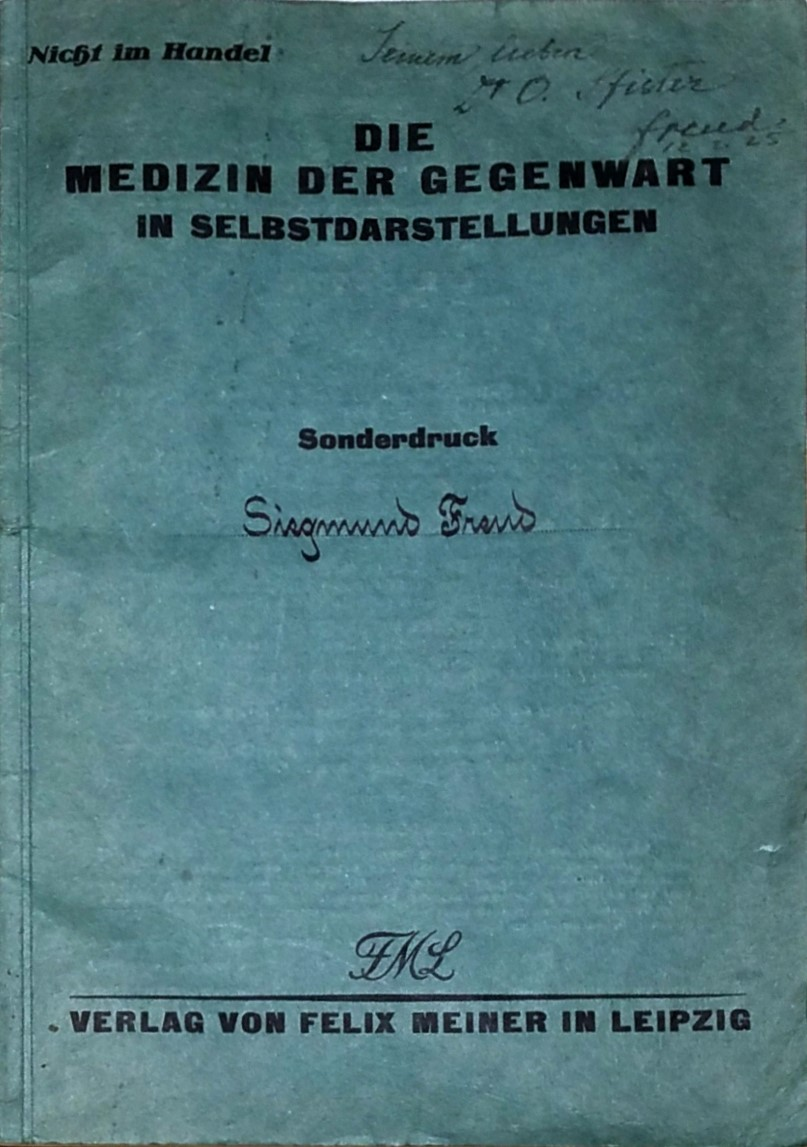
Offprint of Selbstdarstellungen by Sigmund Freud from L.R. Grotes' Die Medizin der Gegenwart in Selbstdarstellungen, IV, 1925.

An offprint is a separate printing of a work that originally appeared as part of a larger publication, usually one of composite authorship such as an academic journal, magazine, or edited book. Offprints are used by authors to promote their work and ensure a wider dissemination and longer life than might have been achieved through the original publication alone. They may be valued by collectors as akin to the first separate edition of a work and, as they are often given away, may bear an inscription from the author. Historically, the exchange of offprints has been a method of correspondence between scholars.

== History ==
The Encyclopedia of Library and Information Science states that, according to James Murray's New English Dictionary on Historical Principles, the word was derived from the German Separatabdruck or the Dutch afdruk.

== Purpose and distribution ==
Offprints serve multiple purposes within the academic and scientific community. Firstly, they allow researchers to distribute their findings to their peers and colleagues, enabling them to share the latest advancements in their respective fields. This helps foster collaboration, feedback, and further research.

Additionally, offprints are often used as promotional tools by authors, research institutions, and publishers. They are distributed at conferences, workshops, and seminars to generate interest and visibility for a particular article, study, or publication. Offprints may also be shared with funding agencies, policymakers, and industry professionals to showcase the impact and significance of the research.

== Production and availability ==
Offprints are typically produced by the publisher of the original article. After an article is published in a scientific journal or other scholarly publication, the corresponding author or authors may be offered the opportunity to order a specific number of offprints. The number of offprints varies depending on the agreement between the author and the publisher, with options ranging from a few dozen to several hundred copies.

Modern offprints are often produced using high-quality printing techniques to replicate the appearance of the original publication. They are usually printed on a smaller scale, with individual copies consisting of a few pages or a condensed version of the original article. The offprints may be customized with the author's name, affiliation, and other relevant details.

The genre is becoming rarer as it is replaced, first, by photocopies of publications and second, by PDF files. These are distributed in a similar manner, but less personalized, since there is usually no dedication or note on PDFs.

== See also ==
- Preprint
- Reprint
