= Bodywork (alternative medicine) =

Any alternative therapy involving physically working with the body

In alternative medicine, bodywork is any therapeutic or personal development technique that involves working with the human body in a form involving manipulative therapy, breath work, or energy medicine. Bodywork techniques also aim to assess or improve posture, promote awareness of the "bodymind connection" which is an approach that sees the human body and mind as a single integrated unit, or to manipulate the electromagnetic field alleged to surround the human body and affect health.

== See also ==
- Mind–body interventions
- Somatics
- Energy medicine
- Myofascial trigger point
