= Sami Schalk =

American gender, disabilities, and women's studies academic

- Education: BA in English, Women's Studies, Miami University, 2008 MFA in Creative Writing, University of Notre Dame, 2010 Ph.D. in Gender Studies, Indiana University, 2014
- Occupations: professor, academic
- Website: samischalk.com

Sami Schalk is an associate professor in the Department of Gender & Women's Studies at the University of Wisconsin–Madison. She was previously an Assistant Professor in the English Department at the University at Albany, SUNY.

In 2019 she started the campaign #twerkwithlizzo, combining fun with larger issues relating to racism, sexism and fatphobia as a form of "pleasure activism". Her twerking with Lizzo went viral.

Dr. Schalk "identifies as a fat, Black, queer, disabled femme and a pleasure activist."

== Cultural significance ==
Schalk twerked with Lizzo onstage on October 10, 2019. She twerked onstage with Janelle Monáe on the Age of Pleasure tour in Indianapolis, Indiana, on September 10, 2023. (Note: "DrSamiSchalk/status/1701205507124416532?s=20". X (formerly Twitter).) She talked with Jonathan Van Ness on his Getting Curious podcast in an episode from October 26, 2022, about Black disability politics.

== Education ==
Schalk received her B.A. in English & Women's Studies in 2008, with a minor in Disability Studies, from Miami University, and her M.F.A. in Creative Writing from the University of Notre Dame in 2010. She received her PhD in Gender Studies from Indiana University in 2014.

== Awards ==
- In 2021, Schalk received the University of Wisconsin System Outstanding Women of Color Award, which is intended to honor women "for their leadership in making significant and lasting contributions to their campuses, their communities or both."
- In 2019, Schalk received the LGBTQ Advocate of the Year award from the OutReach LGBT Community Center in Madison, Wisconsin.

== Publications ==
Schalk has published numerous journal articles, book chapters, essays, reviews, and popular articles. In 2018, she published a monograph titled Bodyminds Reimagined: (Dis)ability, Race, and Gender in Black Women’s Speculative Fiction. In 2022, she published the book Black Disability Politics. It is also available online through open access downloads from the publisher. Her books were published through Duke University Press.
