= Helena Hansen =

American psychiatrist

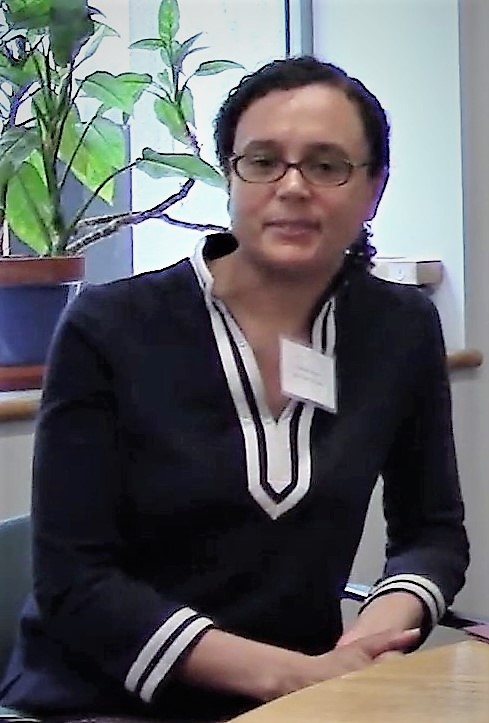
- Hansen at the 2017 National Conference for Physician Scholars in the Social Sciences and Humanities (SHSSM)
- Education: Harvard University, Yale University, NYU Langone Health
- Spouse: Mark Turner
- Children: 2
- Scientific career
- Workplaces: NYU Medical Center; University of California, Los Angeles
- Thesis: !En Victoria! : spiritual capital and self-made men in Puerto Rican addiction ministries (2004)

Helena Hansen is an American psychiatrist and anthropologist who is a professor and Chair of Translational Social Science at University of California, Los Angeles. Her research considers health equity, and has called for clinical practitioners to address social determinants of health. She holds an Honorary Doctorate from the Icahn School of Medicine at Mount Sinai and was elected Fellow of the National Academy of Medicine in 2021.

== Early life and education ==
Hansen was raised in Berkeley, California, where she graduated from Berkeley High School. She then completed her undergraduate degree at Harvard University. She was a graduate student at Yale University, where she earned both a medical degree and a doctorate in cultural anthropology. During her doctorate research she worked in Havana on AIDS policy. She also spent time in Puerto Rico, where she studied faith healing programmes led by ex-addicts in Christian ministries. She was a clinical resident in psychiatry at NYU Medical Center, where she investigated the introduction of new pharmaceuticals.

== Research and career ==
Hansen has studied healthcare equality and the social determinants of health. She has investigated the impact of discrimination and healthcare on mental health. Hansen became concerned that neurochemical treatments may be establishing and strengthening racial hierarchies. Hansen created a documentary film based on her doctoral work and supported by the Robert Wood Johnson Foundation. The film, which considered race, class and addiction to pharmaceuticals, debuted at the American Psychiatric Association annual meeting. The film follows three New Yorkers as they move on and off methadone and suboxone.

While at NYU, Hansen taught undergraduate and graduate courses in anthropology. She was made a scholar of the Robert Wood Johnson Foundation in 2009. In 2021, she was elected member of the National Academy of Medicine.

Hansen lives in Los Angeles with her husband, jazz saxophonist Mark Turner.

== Selected publications ==
- Jonathan M. Metzl; Helena Hansen (1 February 2014). "Structural competency: theorizing a new medical engagement with stigma and inequality". Social Science & Medicine. 103: 126–133. doi:10.1016/j.socscimed.2013.06.032. ISSN 0277-9536. PMC 4269606. PMID 24507917. Wikidata Q34725957.
- Julie Netherland; Helena B Hansen (6 June 2016). "The War on Drugs That Wasn't: Wasted Whiteness, "Dirty Doctors," and Race in Media Coverage of Prescription Opioid Misuse". Culture, Medicine and Psychiatry. 40 (4): 664–686. doi:10.1007/s11013-016-9496-5. ISSN 0165-005X. PMC 5121004. PMID 27272904. Wikidata Q39702860.
- Helena Hansen; Philippe Bourgois; Ernest Drucker (1 February 2014). "Pathologizing poverty: new forms of diagnosis, disability, and structural stigma under welfare reform". Social Science & Medicine. 103: 76–83. doi:10.1016/j.socscimed.2013.06.033. ISSN 0277-9536. PMC 3920192. PMID 24507913. Wikidata Q37576052.

=== Books ===
- Hansen, Helena (2018-04-20). Addicted to Christ. doi:10.1525/california/9780520298033.001.0001. ISBN 9780520298033.
- Hansen, Helena; Metzl, Jonathan, eds. (2019). Structural Competency in Mental Health and Medicine: A Case-Based Approach to Treating the Social Determinants of Health. Springer International Publishing. ISBN 978-3-030-10524-2.
