= Margaret Price (scholar) =

American academic

Margaret Price is an American academic in the fields of rhetoric, composition and literacy, as well as disability and mad studies. She is the author of Mad at School (2011) and Crip Spacetime (2024).

As of 2024, she works at the Ohio State University, where she serves as an associate professor in the English and Women's, Gender and Sexuality Studies Departments. She is also director of the university's Disability Studies Program.

== Education ==
Price earned her Bachelor of Arts from Amherst College, her Master of Fine Arts from the University of Michigan, and her Doctor of Philosophy from the University of Massachusetts.

== Career ==
In 2011, Price published Mad at School: Rhetorics of Mental Disability and Academic Life through the University of Michigan Press. The book won the Outstanding Book Award from the Conference on College Composition and Communication.

Price joined the Ohio State University in 2015. The following year, she was inducted into the Susan M. Daniels Disability Mentoring Hall of Fame on behalf of the National Disability Mentoring Coalition. In 2024, Price published Crip Spacetime: Access, Failure, and Accountability in Academic Life through Duke University Press. As of 2024, Price works at the Ohio State University, where she serves as an associate professor in the English and Women's, Gender and Sexuality Studies Departments. She is also director of the university's Disability Studies Program.

== Personal life ==
Price is genderqueer femme. As of 2016, she lived in Clintonville with her partner, Johnna Keller.

== Publications ==
- Mad at School: Rhetorics of Mental Disability and Academic Life. University of Michigan Press. 2011.
- Crip Spacetime: Access, Failure, and Accountability in Academic Life. Duke University Press. 2024.
