= Physician Payments Sunshine Act =

United States healthcare law

The Physician Payments Sunshine Act is a 2010 United States healthcare law to increase transparency of financial relationships between health care providers and pharmaceutical manufacturers and medical device manufacturers.

== About ==
The Sunshine Act requires manufacturers of drugs, medical devices, biological and medical supplies covered by the three federal health care programs Medicare, Medicaid, and State Children's Health Insurance Program (SCHIP) to collect and track all financial relationships with physicians and teaching hospitals and to report these data to the Centers for Medicare and Medicaid Services (CMS). The goal of the law is to increase the transparency of financial relationships between health care providers and pharmaceutical manufacturers and to uncover potential conflicts of interest. The bill allows states to enact "additional requirements", as six states already had industry-pay disclosure laws.

In 2013, the American Medical Association offered physicians training to understand the Sunshine Act.

A recent 2024 analysis suggests nearly 60% of experts who reviewed manuscripts for four major medical journals received at least one payment from the industry over a recent three-year period, with a total exceeding $1 billion. From 2020 to 2022, 1,155 of the 1,962 reviewers for The BMJ, JAMA, The Lancet, and The New England Journal of Medicine received payments. More than half of these reviewers—1,060—accepted general payments for activities like travel, speaking, consulting, and meals, while 623 reviewers (32%) received research-related payments. Of the $1.06 billion in total payments, $1 billion went towards research, including payments to individual physicians and institutions where reviewers served as principal investigators in clinical studies.

== History ==
The Sunshine Act was first introduced in 2007 by senior US Senator Charles Grassley, a Republican from Iowa and Senator Herb Kohl from Wisconsin, a member of the Democratic Party. The act was introduced independently and failed. After debate by various groups it was enacted along with the 2010 Patient Protection and Affordable Care Act.

In 2011, it was proposed to use identification systems on tracked physicians.

On September 30, 2014, the Centers for Medicare and Medicaid Services reported payment information on its Open Payment Program website for the first time, the data from 2012.

== Effect of Sunshine Act ==
In 2012, prior to the implementation of Sunshine Act, an analysis of state sunshine laws suggested that the federal act might have a limited effect on prescribing and on expenditures. A study of trends in industry payments found that the dollar value of payments had declined from $1.34 billion in 2014 to $1.28 billion in 2022, and that the number of physicians receiving payments had also decreased.

A 2015 opinion piece in JAMA stated that the value of transparency was beyond dispute, but "the true value of the database remains uncertain and probably too early to ascertain".

== International comparison ==
There is no agreement on appropriate standards of disclosure internationally.

Australia was one of the first countries that has, since mid-2007, required reporting of details of every industry-sponsored event. Data are publicly posted, updated every six months and downloadable as pdf only. A 2009 study found modest expenditure at individual events, but high cumulatively, particularly for prescribers of high cost drugs like oncologists, endocrinologists, and cardiologists. It concluded disclosure requirements fell short of what is required and proposed more comprehensive data collections.

In The Netherlands the Transparantieregister Zorg was founded in 2013, that requires full disclosure of payments above 500 euro from pharmaceutical companies and manufacturers of medical devices to healthcare workers, patient organizations et cetera. The effectiveness of this register will be evaluated in 2019.
