= Patricia Berne =

American disability rights activist (1967–2025)

- Born: January 21, 1967; San Francisco, California
- Died: May 29, 2025 (aged 58); Berkeley, California
- Education: University of California, Berkeley
- Known for: Co-founding Sins Invalid, Disability justice advocacy
- Movement: Disability justice movement
- Board member of: San Francisco Women Against Rape; Ford Foundation ADA 30 Advisory Board
- Partner: Juan Pinales (2005/6 - )
- Awards: Empress I Jose Sarria Award for Uncommon Leadership (2009)
- Honours: Ford Foundation Disability Futures Fellow
- Style: Performance Art, Theatre, Directing
- Website: Sins Invalid Official Website

Patricia "Patty" Berne (January 21, 1967 – May 29, 2025) was an American writer, performance artist, director, and disability justice organizer. Berne was founding member of the disability justice movement and framework, and was the co-founder of Sins Invalid, a disability justice-based performance project.

== Biography ==
Berne was born in 1967 in San Francisco to Sugako Berne, a Japanese immigrant, and Maurice Berne, a Haitian immigrant. Berne had three sisters, Chieko Therese Tomasulo, Simone Billings, and Mary Bow. Berne was born disabled and was told that they would not live past the age of 16. Berne used they/she pronouns and identified as queer.

Berne began college aged 16 at the University of California, Berkeley. She joined Students Against Intervention in Central America. Berne joined protests on campus and was arrested at one. Their charges were soon dismissed, which Berne took issue with, as it was due to the court being inaccessible to wheelchair users. Using the discriminatory dismissal, Berne was able to get the charges dismissed for every protester.

Berne has been trained in clinical psychology.

== Career ==
=== Disability Justice Movement ===
Berne focused on arts-based disability justice advocacy and resistance work. The disability justice movement was pioneered by Berne along with other advocates – Mia Mingus, Leroy F. Moore Jr., Eli Clare, Sebastian Margaret, Stacey Milbern, and the Disability Justice Collective – in California in the early 2000s. They wanted to build a cross-movement and intersectional disability movement, correcting the white-centric gaze and single-issue focus of the earlier Disability rights movement.

Berne later explained why disability justice was important and how it differed from disability rights for the Disability Visibility Project:

I think there were huge advances made by the Disability Rights Movement in terms of codifying legal rights for people with disabilities, particularly centralizing people with mobility impairments. At the same time I like to think of them as cliff hangers... It can take you so far, and then as awareness moves forward both because of new understandings and new participants in movements, … it's another generation, another iteration....
Disability Justice as a framework understands disability within a social justice context understanding that we all live in multiple power relations. So, within white supremacy, within patriarchy, within capitalism, within heteronormativity, within enforced interbinaries. We're also living with anabolism and all these different oppressions, structural oppressions interact with each other, and rather than centralizing one …

— Patricia Berne, Disability Visibility Project,

As well as defining and outlining the second wave of disability advocacy, Berne introduced the idea and framework of disability justice to future leaders of the movement, including Alice Wong. Berne identified 10 core principles of disability justice in 2016:

1. Intersectionality;
2. Leadership by People and Communities most Impacted;
3. Anti-Capitalism Politics;
4. Cross-Movement Solidarity;
5. Disabled people are Whole;
6. Sustainability;
7. Cross-Disability Solidarity;
8. Interdependence;
9. Collective Access(ibility); and
10. Collective Intersectional Liberation.

For Berne, disability justice also required decolonizating the body and language justice. Berne also advocated for immigrants and asylum seekers, focusing on those fleeing war, violence, or torture. She also worked directly with the Haitian and Palestinian communities, victims of sexual assault and violence, incarcerated youth, and Guatemalan democratic advocates.

Berne developed a found family with other disability justice advocates and artists, calling Micah Bazant, Mordecai Cohen Ettinger, Jolanta Kata, and Andrea Gruebele their "chosen siblings."

Berne and Maria R. Palacios founded the Crip Survival Network to support disabled people displaced by climate change and climate disasters.

=== Art and Advocacy ===
In 2005, Berne co-founded Sins Invalid with Leroy F. Moore Jr. Berne would later serve as the executive director and Artistic Director of "a disability justice-based movement building and performance project" led by disabled people of color. Berne directed 11 shows at Sins Invalid. A central question in much of Berne's work at Sins Invalid surrounded eroticism (cripping sex) and embodiment. Berne explained to HuffPost that "As a person with a disability, I don't have to mimic able-bodiedness in order to be sexual. I can experience my sexuality as a crip, as someone who fully occupies a non-normative physical space. And part of that movement to fully living in one's own experience is naming and resisting dehumanization."

In 2014, Berne and Sins Invalid boycotted the Vancouver Queer Film Festival and began Disability Justice for Palestine in protest of the festival's "pinkwashing" of Israel during the 2014 Gaza War. They released a statement that their "organization included many people of color with intimate connections to genocidal violence, and a number of Jewish people" and that they "were angered and disappointed to see the print ad accepted by the VQFF that attempts to portray the state of Israel as a friend to LGBTQ communities, particularly in the current moment as the people of Palestine are living through hell and dying in staggering numbers daily." Sins Invalid have also had campaigns on Language Justice is Disability Justice, Disability Justice is Climate Justice, Reproductive Justice is Disability Justice, and advocating against the prison industrial complex and police violence.

Berne was also 2020 Ford Foundation Disability Futures Fellow. In 2009, Berne was awarded the Empress I Jose Sarria Award for Uncommon Leadership by the National Gay and Lesbian Task Force. In 2015, Berne was a given White House Champions of Change Nomination, but she chose to decline.

Berne was a long-time board member of San Francisco Women Against Rape. Berne also served on the founding boards of the Elders of Peacock Rebellion and Health Justice Commons.

Berne was a prolific contributor to the public discourse about disability justice. Disability justice activist and artist Lateef McLeod called Berne, "mother of disability justice and this second wave of the disability movement." Alice Wong called them "a revolutionary, an elder, and an oracle."

=== Books ===
- Berne, Patty; Langstaff, David; Moore, Leroy F. Jr; Lamm, Nomy; Milbern, Stacey; Nishida, Akemi; Ulanday Barrett, K; Levins Morales, Aurora; Piepzna-Samarasinha, Leah Lakshmi; et al. (Sins Invalid) (2016). Skin, Tooth, and Bone: The Basis of Movement is Our People: A Disability Justice Primer (PDF) (2nd ed.). Berkeley, California: Sins Invalid. pp. 16–20. ASIN B0DM2G9QPP. doi:10.1080/09688080.2017.1335999.
- Berne, Patty (2020). "To Survive Climate Catastrophe, Look to Queer and Disabled Folks". In Wong, Alice (ed.). Disability Visibility: First-Person Stories from the Twenty-First Century. Chapter dictated and edited by Vanessa Raditz. Vintage Publishing. ISBN 978-1-9848-9942-2.

=== Selected Articles ===
- Berne, Patricia; Lewis, Jamal T.; Milbern, Stacey; Shanks, Malcolm; Vaid-Menon, Alok; Wong, Alice (2018). ""Beauty Always Recognizes Itself": A Roundtable on Sins Invalid". Women's Studies Quarterly. 46 (1/2 Beauty (Spring/Summer 2018)). New York City: The Feminist Press at the City University of New York: 241–252 – via JSTOR.
- Berne, Patty; Lamm, Nomy (May 1, 2022), Charne, Madeline; Sellar, Tom (eds.), "Learning from Our Survival: Patty Berne and Nomy Lamm (Sins Invalid), In Conversation", Theater, vol. 52, no. 2, David Geffen School of Drama at Yale University, pp. 21–31, doi:10.1215/01610775-9662194, ISSN 0161-0775

=== Filmography ===
| Year | Title | Role | Notes | Source |
|---|---|---|---|---|
| 2013 | Sins Invalid: An unshamed claim to beauty | Co-Producer | Documentary, Performance Art, 32 min | |
| July 13, 2014 | Fixed: The Science/Fiction of Human Enhancement | Cast (as Self) | Documentary | |
| 2021 | Loving With Three Hearts / Amar con tres corazones | Co-Producer | Documentary, 39 min, in English, Spanish, ASL | |

== Awards ==
| Year | Award | Awarding Body | Reference |
|---|---|---|---|
| 2025 | Rest and Care Sabbatical Award | Rainin Foundation | |
| 2021 | Unsettling Dramaturgy Award | | |
| 2020 | Disability Futures Fellowship | Ford Foundation, Andrew W. Mellon Foundation | |
| 2020 | Grantee | Art Matters Foundation | |
| 2018 | 100 Honoree | Yerba Buena Center for the Arts | |
| 2009 | Empress I Jose Sarria Award for Uncommon Leadership | National Gay and Lesbian Task Force | |

== See also ==
- Artivism – art-based activism
