= Walela Nehanda =

American writer

- Occupations: Writer; poet; cultural worker
- Writing career
- Genres: Memoir; poetry
- Notable work: Bless the Blood

Walela Nehanda is an American writer, poet, and cultural worker from Los Angeles. Their debut book, Bless the Blood: A Cancer Memoir, was published by Kokila in 2024. The book won the 2025 International Literacy Association Young Adult Nonfiction Book Award. Nehanda was included in Out magazine's 2020 Out100 and was selected as a 2024 Disability Futures Fellow.

== Life and work ==
Nehanda was born and is based in Los Angeles. Their early work included spoken word poetry and performance in Los Angeles.

Nehanda has written about illness, disability, cancer care, and medical racism for publications including Self and Time. In 2022, Nehanda was a fellow with Zoeglossia. In 2024, the Ford Foundation and Mellon Foundation named Nehanda to the final cohort of Disability Futures Fellows, a program administered by United States Artists.

== Cancer and disability advocacy ==
Nehanda was diagnosed with chronic myeloid leukemia at age 23. They later received a stem cell transplant during the early months of the COVID-19 pandemic. Nehanda has discussed how cancer care, disability, race, gender, and body size shaped their experiences in the United States health care system.

During the early COVID-19 pandemic, Out credited Nehanda with helping obtain supplies for 200 immunocompromised people and encouraging more than 6,000 people to register with the Be the Match bone marrow donor registry.

== Bless the Blood ==
Nehanda's debut book, Bless the Blood: A Cancer Memoir, was published by Kokila, an imprint of Penguin Random House, in 2024. The book combines poetry and prose to recount Nehanda's leukemia diagnosis, treatment, and experiences with medical racism.

Publishers Weekly called the book "a forcefully crafted collection of poetic and narrative storytelling". Kirkus Reviews described it as a memoir about a young Black nonbinary activist confronting cancer and medical racism. School Library Journal recommended the book for teen memoir collections.

In 2025, the International Literacy Association named Bless the Blood the winner of its Young Adult Nonfiction Book Award.

== Bibliography ==
- Bless the Blood: A Cancer Memoir. Kokila, 2024. ISBN 9780593529492.
