= Camp Jened =

Summer camp for disabled people in New York

- Undated advertisement for Camp Jened
- Interactive map of Camp Jened
- Location: Hunter, New York and Rock Hill, New York
- Coordinates: 42.198626°N 74.198461°W
- Established: 1951
- Closed: 2009
- Website: "campjened.org". Archived from the original on 8 February 1999.

Camp Jened was a summer camp for disabled people in the state of New York that became a springboard for the disability rights movement and independent living movement in the United States. Many campers and counselors (known as "Jenedians") became disability rights activists, such as Judith Heumann, James LeBrecht, and Bobbi Linn.

== History ==
In 1951, Camp Jened was established at the foot of Hunter Mountain in the Catskill Mountains as a camp for disabled children, teenagers, and adults. The camp was meant to provide a nurturing community environment for people with a range of disabilities, such as polio and cerebral palsy. Camp sessions were typically four or eight weeks. In the 1950s, the camp followed a relatively traditional summer camp structure. Alan Winters served as an early director of the camp. The camp was partially funded and supported by the Jened Foundation, a parent-led foundation that organized fundraisers. Counselors were typically college students who had been recruited for summer jobs.

In the 1960s and 1970s, the camp became heavily influenced by the 1960s counterculture and hippie values. In the mid-1960s, Jack Birnbaum, a social worker, came to Camp Jened. He had previously worked at another camp for disabled youth in Oakhurst, New Jersey. He asked Larry Allison, a counselor at the camp in Oakhurst, to come with him and serve as unit head. Birnbaum and Allison were interested in developing a camp culture that was less structured than their previous camp experiences. Later, Allison became the program director. In this role, he was "an affable longhair" with a "dry fuck-you sense of humor".

Camp Jened was a notably social environment. Some campers saw it as utopian. Former camper Denise Jacobson said: "It was so funky! But it was utopia when we were there. There was no outside world." There were about 120 campers with minimal adult supervision. Campers formed bonds removed from the stigma, shame, and isolation they often encountered back home. Some campers experimented with cannabis and formed romantic relationships. Counselors slept in the same cabins as the campers, and music was often played. Most of the campers were from New York, but some came from Canada and other parts of the U.S.

Despite its profound social impact, the camp often experienced financial issues. Allison said in an interview that "money was a constant struggle", and counselors were paid $250 for the summer. In 1977, the camp closed due to financial difficulty. In 1980, Camp Jened reopened in Rock Hill, New York, and became a part of the Cerebral Palsy Associations of New York State. It closed again in 2009.

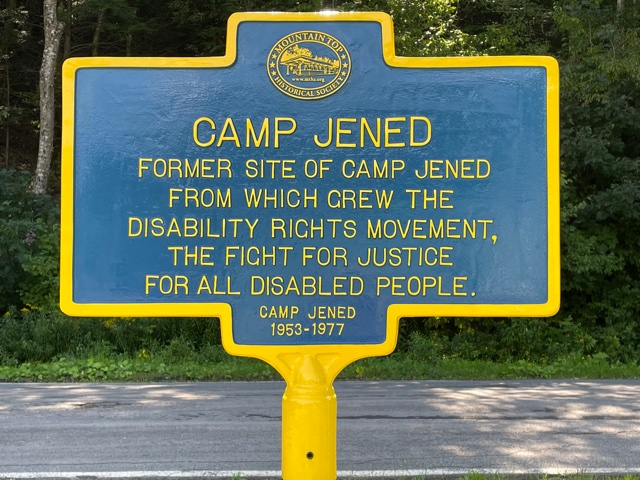
Historical Marker for Camp Jened in Hunter, New York

== Influence on activism ==
Camp Jened provided a fertile environment for political and social discussions. Judith Heumann, a former counselor at the camp, said: "At Camp Jened we were able to envision a world that didn’t have to be set up in a way that excluded us. We started to have a common vision and were beginning to talk about things like, ‘Why are buses not accessible?'" Former camper James LeBrecht said: "I had this sense that the world was unfair. As a young teenager I realized, 'Wow, we can actually fight back.'" Jenedians also discussed the role of the family, including disabled people's right to privacy (rather than constant family intervention) and the impact of sexism in how parents treated their disabled children.

Furthermore, non-disabled staff came to deeply consider the struggles of disabled individuals. Allison said: "We realized the problem did not exist with disabled people. The problem existed with people that didn't have disabilities. It was our problem." An African-American counselor, Lionel Je' Woodyard, said, "Whatever obstacles there were in my way for being a Black man, the same thing was held true for individuals in wheelchairs."

These experiences helped inspire Jenedians to become politically active. In 1970, Heumann sued the Board of Education for discrimination after she was denied a teacher's license. She won the case, becoming the first person in a wheelchair to teach in New York City. That same year, Disabled in Action was formed by a group that included Heumann, Bobbi Linn, and other Jenedians. The organization advocated for the civil rights and security for disabled people. Of the formation of Disabled in Action, Linn said: "I think of Camp Jened as the training ground where people learned that they had the same rights as everybody else, and a lot of the original people were people from Jened." In the early 1970s, Disabled in Action organized protests, such as the 1972 Manhattan traffic blockade to protest Richard Nixon's veto of the Rehabilitation Act of 1972. The act would have provided supplies for dialysis machines and established centers for people living with hearing loss, visual impairment, and spinal cord injuries.

By the mid-1970s, a group of Jenedians joined the Center for Independent Living in Berkeley, California. The center, which had been formed by disabled student activists at University of California, Berkeley, aimed to support the independence, dignity, and self-determination of disabled people. It was near the UC Berkeley campus and provided peer-based services to assist with housing and job training. Independent living became a cornerstone of the disability rights movement.

In 1977, Jenedians participated in the 504 Sit-in in San Francisco, a sit-in protest at the local Department of Health, Education, and Welfare (HEW) office that lasted nearly a month. Many organizations participated in the sit-in. The Black Panthers provided meals, and the Salvation Army provided mattresses. Other groups that joined the sit-in included the United Farm Workers, Glide Memorial Church, the Gay Men's Butterfly Brigade, and Delancey Street Foundation.

For decades, Jenedians participated in activism and advocacy that led to the passing of the Americans with Disabilities Act of 1990, among other achievements. Heumann became the first Director for the Department on Disability Services, and served as an advisor on disability rights for the United States Department of State and the World Bank. Linn became the first executive director of the Bronx Independent Living Services (BILS) and in 2019 was inducted into the New York State Disability Rights Hall of Fame. LeBrecht helped form the Disabled Student Union at the University of California, San Diego and co-directed a documentary, Crip Camp, about Camp Jened. Allison served as deputy director at the New York City Mayor's Office for People with Disabilities from 1973 to 1991, worked to improve polling place accessibility, and taught special education in Brooklyn.

== Portrayal in publications ==
In 2004, Camp Jened was covered in New York Activists and Leaders in the Disability Rights and Independent Living Movement, published by the Regents of the University of California. The three-part publication provided an oral history account of the disability rights movement in New York, as part of the Disability Rights and Independent Living Movement Oral History Project. Subjects who discussed Camp Jened were Allison, interviewed by Denise Sherer Jacobson in 2001, and Linn, interviewed by Sharon Bonney in 2001.

== Portrayal in popular culture ==
In March 2020, Camp Jened was profiled in the documentary Crip Camp, directed by LeBrecht and Nicole Newnham. The film features former camp members, including Heumann, as well as footage that LeBrecht shot as a 15-year-old camper in 1971. The film is critically acclaimed and won several accolades, including the Audience Award at the 2020 Sundance Film Festival and the Zeno Mountain Award at the 2020 Miami Film Festival.
