= Leroy F. Moore Jr. =

American poet

- Born: November 2, 1967 (age 58); New York City, United States
- Education: College of Notre Dame UCLA
- Occupations: Writer, Activist, Musician, Poet
- Known for: Co-founding Krip Hop and Sins Invalid
- Board member of: National Black Disability Coalition Black Disability Studies Committee; Disability Voices United; Sins Invalid
- Awards: 2x Sports Emmy Award; Wynn Newhouse Award
- Musical career
- Also known as: The Black Kripple
- Genres: Hip-Hop; Soul music; Rap
- Publisher: Krip-Hop Nation
- Partner: Keith Jones (Fezo DA MadOne)
- Website: Krip-Hop Institute Official Website; Krip-Hop Nation Official Website
- Writing career
- Genres: Poetry, Non-Fiction, Graphic Novel
- Notable works: Black Disabled Ancestors (2020); Black Disabled Art History 101 (2017)

Member of San Francisco Mayor’s Disability Council
- In office 2001–2002
- Appointed by: San Francisco Office on Disability and Accessibility
- Leader: Willie Brown

Leroy F. Moore Jr. (November 2, 1967- ) is a Black American writer, poet, community activist, musician, paralympian, and 2x Sports Emmy winner. He was born in 1967 in New York City. He is one of the founders of Krip-Hop and Sins Invalid. Moore has Cerebral palsy.

== Education ==
Moore graduated with a BA in Political Science from College of Notre Dame in 1995. He is currently a PhD candidate in Linguistic Anthropology at University of California, Los Angeles. His thesis is called "Krip-Hop Theory and Liberation Art: A Road Map from Black Ableism to AfroKrip/Sankofa."

== Career ==
=== Paralympics ===
Moore represented the US in the 1988 Paralympic Games in Seoul, South Korea as a Paracyclist. He competed in the Men's Road Tricycle 1,500m C5-6 and 3,000m C5-6 and ranked 5th in both events. "Seeing disabled people around the world at Seoul 1988, it was the first time for me to realise that disability is a culture, history and movement," said Moore. He was later highlighted as a musician and former paralympian in the 2020 Tokyo Paralympics, playing the Emmy-winning song 'Rising Phoenix.'

=== Disability Advocacy ===
In 1998, Moore and Gary Norris Gray created the Disability Advocates of Minorities Organization (DAMO). DAMO created and ran a public access talk show, New Voices Disabled Poets & Artists of Color, ran workshops and classes, organized protests, and worked as a disability access consultant. DAMO dissolved after four years.

After DAMO ended, Moore reflected that "Upon evaluation of DAMO I realized I have been running away from my Black community because of open wounds unknowingly inflicted by them through forms of Black ableism... Most areas of disability have been taken from us, including the medical industry, and professionals/experts etc. Until we take it back, redefine it, politicize it, and sometimes change it all together our work will continue to belong to others."

Moore is a co-founder, along with Patty Berne, of the disability performance art collective Sins Invalid. Started in 2005, Sins Invalid is a disabled-led disability justice movement and performance project.

He currently serves as the Chair of the Black Disability Studies Committee for the National Black Disability Coalition. Moore was a co-founder of the Coalition.

Moore focuses his advocacy on the intersectionality between race and disability, Krip-Hop Theory, police brutality against disabled people, Black disabled history, and combatting intersectional ableism and racism in the music industry.

=== Krip-Hop ===
Moore and his counterparts Rob DA' Noise Temple and Keith Jones started Krip-Hop, a movement that uses hip-hop music as a means of expression for people with disabilities. The primary goal of the Krip-Hop Nation is to increase awareness in music and media outlets of the talents, history and rights of people with disabilities. The Krip Hop Nation also focuses on advocacy, activism and education and holds workshops on relevant social, artistic, and political issues.

Krip-Hop Nation released its first mixtape in 2007 and performed at a festival for the first time, DaDaFest, in 2010. Moore and Krip-Hop organized the 'Black Disabled Komics Karacters Summit/Krip-Hop Visual Art Show' in 2020 and the 'African Disabled Musicians San Francisco Bay Area Tour' in 2019.

As leadership for Krip-Hop Nation, Moore as served as a producer for multiple music and film projects. He has also been the subject of two award-winning documentaries, Disabled Artist Showcase: Creating Our Spaces (2023) and ADA30 Lead On Celebration of Disability Arts, Culture, Education and Pride (2020).

Moore was interviewed by Jones for the Disability Visibility Project in 2016.

==== Discography ====
- Moore Jr., Leroy F.; 2Tha Point Entertainment (2010). Krip-Hop, Volume 2: Forget How They Look Listen 2 The Music.
- Moore Jr., Leroy F. (2011). Broken Bodies: PBP, Police Brutality Profiling Mixtape (Album). Krip-Hop Nation & 5th Battaliono Entertainment.
- Moore Jr., Leroy F.; Fezo da MadOne (2014). Eat My Disability (Song). Vol. 3 Book1ne – via SoundCloud.
- Moore Jr., Leroy F. (2018). KutDaChek (Song) – via Soundcloud.
- Moore Jr., Leroy F. (March 14, 2018). Calling Mississippi: Walking, Limping & Wheeling Through Blues Trails (Song) – via SoundCloud.
- Moore Jr., Leroy F. (The Black Kripple) (2020). Story Not Told: Black Disabled Boyz (Song) – via Soundcloud.
- Pemberton, Daniel; Georgetragic; Hickman, Toni; Jones, Keith; Moore, Leroy (2020). Rising Phoenix Title Track (Motion picture).
- Moore Jr., Leroy F. (August 31, 2021). Slow Eugenics (Song) – via SoundCloud.
- Moore Jr., Leroy F. (2022). Leave The Ramp Down (Remix) (Song) – via SoundCloud.
- Moore Jr., Leroy F. (September 21, 2025). WWM-White Wealthy Men (Song) – via SoundCloud.
- Moore Jr., Leroy F. (October 29, 2025). Hip-Hop, Your Disability Politics Sucks! (Song) – via SoundCloud.
- Moore Jr., Leroy F. (December 20, 2025). Shout Out BDM Crew (Tumelo, Leroy & DJ Duma) (Song) – via SoundCloud.
- Moore Jr., Leroy F. (2023). Krip Blue Stories: Black, Blind, & Beautiful (Album) – via SoundCloud.
- Moore Jr., Leroy F. (February 20, 2026). The Black Mindset on Disability (Song) – via SoundCloud.
- Moore Jr., Leroy F. (June 2026). Dr. Krip-Hop (Song) – via SoundCloud.
- Moore Jr., Leroy F. (March 28, 2026). Analogies with Amputations, Not Disability but In The Body Schema Through the Colonizer (Song) – via SoundCloud.
- Moore Jr., Leroy F.; manos. al sol (April 25, 2026). Kripping Gloria Ladson-Billings' Culturally Relevant Pedagogy (CRP) with Hip-Hop 2026 (Song) – via SoundCloud.
- Moore Jr., Leroy F. (Jun 2026). Krip-Blues Stories Series: Teaching Krip-Blues (Album). Produced by Hash24 and Manos.al Sol – via SoundCloud.
- Moore Jr., Leroy F. (July 2, 2026). We Want The White Man Who Controls You (Song) – via SoundCloud.
- Moore Jr., Leroy F. (July 17, 2026). Krip-Hop Theory (Poem-song) (Song). Revised version. Original published 6/29/21. – via SoundCloud.

==== Filmography ====
Year	Title	Director	Role	Source
2023	Disabled Artist Showcase: Creating Our Spaces	Emmitt H. Thrower	Cast (as Self)	
2023	ADA30 Lead On Celebration of Disability Arts, Culture, Education and Pride	Tari Hartman Squire and Danny Woodburn	Cast (as Self)	
2023	Tell Them You Love Me	Nick August-Perna	Consultant Producer	
2020	Disability and Cultural Activism	Emmitt H. Thrower	Associate Producer, Music Producer, Cast (as Self)	
2015	Where Is Hope: The Art of Murder	Emmitt H. Thrower	Co-Producer, Music Producer, Composer	
2014	"Blind Joe" – The Joe Capers Legacy An Alternative Minds Film	Naru Kwina	Producer	

=== Writing ===
Since the 1990s, Moore has written the column "Ill in-N-Chilling" for POOR Magazine. Moore served as a founding member of Poor Magazine's Homefulness and Decolonize Academy.

He has written 6 books and 50+ written and spoken-word poems. He shares his spoken-word poetry along with his music on his SoundCloud. He co-authored a children's book called Black Disabled Art History 101.

==== Books ====
- Moore Jr., Leroy F. (1999). Black Disabled Man with A Big Mouth & High I.Q. Gibbs Magazine.
- Moore Jr., Leroy F. (2017). Black Disabled Art History 101. Xochipilli Justice Press. ISBN 978-1942001577.
- Moore Jr., Leroy F. (February 10, 2019). Brown Disabled Young Woman Superhero Brings Disability Justice to Hip- Hop (Graphic Novel). Krip-Hop Graphic Novel Issue 1. Poor Press. ISBN 978-1732925021.
- Moore Jr., Leroy F. (February 12, 2020). Black Disabled Ancestors. Poor Press. ISBN 979-8610521022.
- Gray-Garcia, Tiny; Moore Jr., Leroy; Miller, Jeremy; Villarreal, Joey; Silencio, Muteado; Moore, Frances (October 21, 2020). How to Not Call the Po'Lice Ever. Poor Press. ISBN 978-1732925076.
- Moore Jr., Leroy F. (February 2021). For You BDYM (Black Disabled Young Men). Soulful Media Works.
- Moore Jr., Leroy F.; Kitosa, Tamari (May 11, 2022). "A Krip-Hop Theory of Disabled Black Men: Challenging the Disabling of Black America, Resisting Killing and Erasure Through the Arts and Self-Empowerment". In Kitossa, Tamari (ed.). Appealing Because He Is Appalling: Black Masculinities, Colonialism, and Erotic Racism. Foreward by Tommy Curry. Contributions by Katerina Deliovsky, Delroy Hall, Dennis O. Howard, Elishma Khokhar, Tamari Kitossa, Kemar McIntosh, Leroy F. Moore Jr., Watufani M. Poe, Satwinder Rehal, John G. Russell, and Mohan Siddi. University of Alberta Press. ISBN 978-1772125436.
- Moore Jr., Leroy F. (October 20, 2023). The Elders and the Youth. Krip-Hop Graphic Novel Vol. 2. Illustrated by Ottis Smith and Erick Matus. Poor Magazine. ISBN 978-1956534085.

==== Poetry ====
- Moore Jr., Leory F. (2009/October 23, 2012). "Cardboard Mattress (For Staff Benda Bilili)." – via SoundCloud.
- Krip-Hop Nation; 5th Battalion Entertainment of LA (2012). Pushed & Punched fin 2 (Spoken-Word Mixtape) – via SoundCloud.
- Moore Jr., Leroy F. (May 20, 2014). "Big Blues." – via SoundCloud.
- Moore Jr., Leroy F. (November 9, 2015). Black Kripple Delivers Poems & Lyrics. Poetic Matrix Press.
  - Moore Jr., Leroy F. (2015). "Black Disabled Art History". The Black Kripple Delivers Poetry and Lyrics. Poetic Matrix Press.
- Moore Jr. Leroy F. (2018). "Invisible Man." – via YouTube.
- Moore Jr., Leory F. (March 5, 2022). "Do You See Me, Sister, Brother." – via SoundCloud.
- Moore Jr., Leory F. (August 3, 2022). "Hip-Hop@50." – via SoundCloud.
- Moore Jr., Leory F. (October 23, 2023). "Got A Letter From the Government." – via SoundCloud.
- Moore Jr., Leory F. (February 19, 2025). "Red, Black, Green & Krip." – via SoundCloud.
- Moore Jr., Leory F. (May 25, 2024). "My Blues Baby." – via SoundCloud.
- Moore Jr., Leory F. (September 2025). "You Can Never Feel The Sting (Inspire by Prodigy)." – via SoundCloud.
- Moore Jr., Leory F. (October 2025). "Dear Hip-Hop and Other Music Genres." – via SoundCloud.
- Moore Jr., Leory F. (January 9, 2026). "What is Black Ableism." – via SoundCloud.
- Moore Jr. Leroy F. (March 15, 2026) "Black Men of Disability." Produced by Khwezi Malusi Duma. – via SoundCloud.
- Moore Jr., Leory F. (March 2026). "Black Disabled Radical." – via SoundCloud.

== Awards ==
Year	Award	Awarding Body	Reference
2022	USA Fellowship	United States Artists	
2022	FDR Award	Disability Rights Legal Center	
2022	7th Athletes in Excellence Award	The Foundation for Global Sports Development	
2021	Outstanding Music Direction for Rising Pheonix	42nd Sports Emmy Awards	
2021	Outstanding Long Sports Documentary for Rising Phoenix	42nd Sports Emmy Awards	
2020	100 Honoree	Yerba Buena Center for the Arts	
2019	Susan M. Daniels Disability Mentoring Hall of Fame	National Disability Mentoring Coalition	
2019	Wynn Newhouse Award	Samuel I. Newhouse Foundation	
2014	Champion of the Disabled in Media	San Francisco Bay View Black Media Appreciation Night	
2005/06	Julie Billiart Award for Outstanding Community Service	Mount Notre Dame High School	
2002	Local Hero Award for Black History Month	KQED of San Francisco	
1998	Award	San Francisco Mayor’s Disability Council	
1995	DREDF Recognition Award	Disability Rights Education and Defense Fund	
1988	5th place – Men's Road Tricycle 1,500m C5-6	Paralympics	
1988	5th place – Men's Road Tricycle 3,000m C5-6	Paralympics	

== See also ==
- Disability justice
- Krip Hop
- Sins Invalid
- Intersectionality
- Spoken word
- Paralympic Games
- Disability studies
- Patricia Berne
