= Christine Sun Kim =

American sound artist (born 1980)

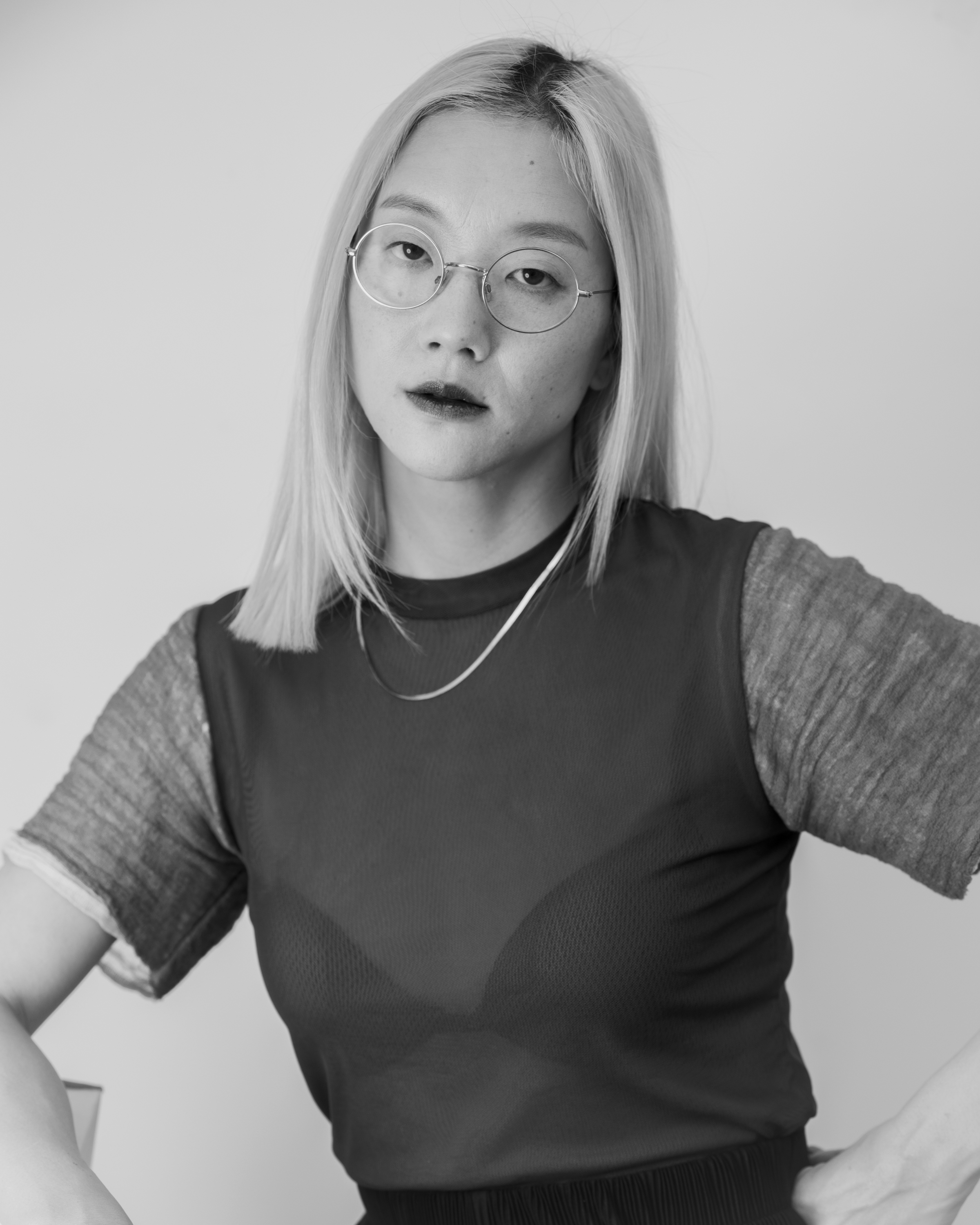
- Christine Sun Kim by Ériver Hijano, 2022
- Born: 1980 (age 45–46); Orange County, California, U.S.
- Education: Rochester Institute of Technology, School of Visual Arts in New York, Bard College
- Occupation: Sound artist
- Known for: Sound art, performance, American Sign Language activism
- Spouse: Thomas Mader
- Children: 2
- Awards: TED Fellow (2013, 2015); MIT Media Lab Director's Fellow (2015); Ford Foundation Disability Futures Fellow (2020)
- Website: christinesunkim.com

Christine Sun Kim (born 1980) is an American sound artist, performer and activist based in Berlin. Working predominantly in drawing, performance, and video, Kim's art practice considers how sound operates in society. Musical notation, written language, American Sign Language (ASL), and the use of the body are all recurring elements in her work. Her work has been exhibited in the Museum of Modern Art's first exhibition about sound in 2013 and the Whitney Biennial in 2019. Her work is often connected to disability art and disability justice.

== Background, education, and early career ==
Christine Sun Kim was born in 1980 and raised in Southern California with hearing parents and a deaf sister. Her first language is American Sign Language. She has been profoundly deaf since birth. She attended University High School in Irvine, California, and graduated from Rochester Institute of Technology in 2002 with a degree in Interdisciplinary Studies. Kim originally wanted to study graphic design but was told that there were not interpreters for the studio art courses and she would have to attend classes which already included Deaf students.

Only later, was Kim able to attend masters programs which allowed her to explore art. She received a Master of Fine Arts in Visual Art from the School of Visual Arts in New York in 2006, and later completed another MFA in Sound and Music from Bard College in 2013.

In addition, Kim worked at the Whitney Museum from 2008 to 2014. While there, she established Deaf-led programs and resources for Deaf museum visitors.

== Work ==
Kim's artwork is multidisciplinary and includes drawings, videos, installations and performances. Kim investigates the operations of sound and various aspects of Deaf culture in her performances, videos, and drawings. In developing her personal visual language, Kim draws from a variety of information systems. She uses elements from these systems such as body language, American Sign Language (ASL), musical and graphic notation, and language interpretation, inventing new structures for her compositions and extending each source's scope of communication. She further uses sound to explore her own relationship to verbal languages and her environment. Through her work, she gains control of voice and sound, seeking to release them from social conventions.

=== Close Readings ===
Christine Sun Kim first experimented working with video in 2015 with her work Close Readings. The work explores closed captioning and how the choices made affect the experience of watching. Kim had four of her deaf friends recreate scenes from The Addams Family, Ghost, and The Little Mermaid by reading only the subtitles. The work reverses the traditional power dynamic between auditory media and Deaf audience by obscuring the upper half of the image, forcing a hearing audience to instead rely on the Deaf provided captions.

=== The Sound of ===
Kim uses sound to explore her feelings in a unique way, as writer Molly Hannon addresses. Kim's series of drawing, "The Sound of," was exhibited at Rubin Museum of Art in 2017. "It all goes back to my experience watching the film, Kumiko, The Treasure Hunter." said Kim. Even though there was not much dialogue, she was fascinated by how detailed and descriptive the captions of the movie were. She started to wonder if she was able to portray the sound of intangible objects like emotions or senses. This has become the essential reason she created this series. She takes traditional music dynamics and refashions them into music notes. In one of her drawings, The Sound of Obsessing, Kim uses the symbol "p" to represent the sound of piano and indicate the note is played quietly. As more "p" appears, the notes are played more quietly. Kim concretizes abstract ideas. She believes that obsession has a repetitive pattern and can take up a person's mind. She illustrates this pattern with the "p"s. "As time goes on, the obsession quickens, represented by the shrinking distance of p's. Finally, at the end, the p's are crowded and your mind is racing non-stop. You become totally engrossed with your obsession."

=== Degrees of Deaf Rage ===
In 2018, Christine Sun Kim created a collection of six charcoal drawings on paper that explore "navigating the hearing world as a deaf person" shown in her series titled Degrees of Deaf Rage. The drawings depict various degrees of angles (acute rage, legit rage, obtuse rage, straight up rage, reflex rage, full on rage), each labeled with rage-inducing experiences Kim experiences as a Deaf person. These different "rage" experiences are the topics of the paintings, being: Art World, Interpreters (Terps), Institutional, Everyday Situations, Educational Settings, and Traveling. She states, "Deaf rage is a real thing. In the Deaf community, it's something we know so well because we've all gone through it." She hopes to "communicate to a wider audience who are not deaf" and are unfamiliar with her culture, as Deaf people are a cultural entity and not just a group of isolated people who have impaired hearing. Kim uses familiar and relatable formats in Degrees of Deaf Rage so that her "deaf ideas" are easily understandable and accessible to hearing individuals as she explains, "It's like mathematical angles. How much rage do I have? You can see it in that size of the angle".

Deaf Rage was shown in 2019 at the Whitney Biennial, until Kim, along with seven other participants, withdrew her work as a protest against a board member's ties to tear gas used at the Mexican-US border against migrants. The board member, Warren Kanders, resigned as a result of this and other protests.

== Notable performances ==
In 2015, she presented a TED Talk at a TED fellows retreat focusing on her relationship to sound, and how she has come to discover similarities between American Sign Language and music. She discussed how she felt that sound does not have to be solely experienced through auditory means.

In 2020, she performed at Super Bowl LIV signing the American national anthem. This began an annual partnership between the National Football League (NFL) and the National Association of the Deaf (NAD). She later penned an op-ed in The New York Times criticizing Fox Sports for cutting away during her American Sign Language performances of "America the Beautiful" and the national anthem.

== Honors and awards ==
- TED Fellow: 2013, 2015
- MIT Media Lab Director's Fellow: 2015
- Ford Foundation Disability Future Fellow: 2020
- Le Prix International d'Art Contemporain: 2022
- Inaugural Radical Transformation Award from the Henkaku Center at Chiba Institute of Technology: 2025
- McArthur Fellow: 2026

== Exhibitions ==
=== Solo exhibitions, performances and projects ===
- 2015: Calibration Room and Bounce House, University of Texas at Austin Visual Arts Center, Austin, U.S.
- 2016: Nap Disturbance, performance, Frieze London, London, UK
- 2016: Face Value, workshop, Tate Modern, London, UK
- 2016: (LISTEN), sound walk organized by Avant.org, New York, U.S.
- 2017: Lautplan, Kammer Klang, Cafe Oto, London, UK
- 2017: Busy Days, De Appel Arts Centre, Amsterdam, Netherlands
- 2018: Sound Diet and Lullabies for Roux, White Space Beijing booth, Art Basel, Basel, Switzerland
- 2018: Too Much Future, public art installation, Whitney Museum of American Art, New York, U.S.
- 2018: Five Finger Discount History, Whitney Museum of American Art, New York, U.S.
- 2018–19: With a Capital D, White Space, Beijing, China
- 2018–19: Finish Forever, Ghebaly Gallery, Los Angeles, U.S.
- 2019: To Point a Naked Finger: Christine Sun Kim & Thomas Mader, Albright-Knox Art Gallery, Buffalo, U.S.
- 2019: Music Box + Smithsonian APA, New Orleans, U.S.
- 2019: Spoken on My Behalf, Brown Arts Initiative, Brown University, Providence, U.S.
- 2022: Christine Sun Kim: Three Echo Traps, the Drawing Center, New York, U.S.
- 2024: Five Finger Discount History, Smithsonian American Art Museum, Washington, D.C., U.S.
- 2025: Christine Sun Kim: All Day All Night, Whitney Museum of American Art, New York, U.S. Traveled to Walker Art Center, Minneapolis in 2026

=== Group exhibitions ===
- 2017: The World is Sound, Rubin Museum of Art, New York, U.S.
- 2017: Soundtracks, San Francisco Museum of Modern Art, San Francisco, U.S.
- 2017: Resonant Spaces, Hood Museum of Art, Dartmouth College, Hanover, U.S.
- 2018: Serralves Collection: New Lines, Images, Objects, Serralves Museum of Contemporary Art, Porto, Portugal
- 2018: For the Record, ifa Gallery, Berlin, Germany
- 2018: Paulo Cunha e Silva Art Prize, Galeria Municipal do Porto, Porto, Portugal
- 2018: What We Make, Ross Art Museum, Delaware, U.S.
- 2018: 50 State Initiative, For Freedoms, Jefferson City and Des Moines, U.S.
- 2019: Louder Than Words, Zuckerman Museum of Art, Kennesaw, U.S.
- 2019: Whitney Biennial 2019, Whitney Museum of American Art, New York, U.S.
- 2019: Resonance: A Sound Art Marathon, Walker Art Center, Minneapolis, U.S.

== Personal life ==
Kim is married to German artist Thomas Mader. The couple has two children.
