= Krip Hop =

Krip-Hop is a movement demonstrating alternate arrangements by which hip hop artists with disabilities can communicate through social media, including educators, journalists, and conferences. The movement uses hip hop music as a means of expression for disabled people, providing them an opportunity to share their experiences. The Guardian has described Krip-Hop Nation as both a campaigning organization and a platform for disabled musicians.

== History ==
Krip Hop was founded by Leroy F. Moore Jr., an African American writer, poet, community activist, and feminist who was diagnosed with cerebral palsy. Moore was born in New York in 1967 to an activist father loosely connected to the Black Panthers. His upbringing sensitized Moore to the challenges faced by African Americans and disabled people. As a youth, Moore discovered that most people had little knowledge of the historical impact of disabled African Americans. This led him to begin research, initially in the music industry.

Moore first spotlighted disabled hip hop artists in the early 2000s. He co-produced and co-hosted a three-part series on what he called "Krip Hop" for a Berkeley, California radio station. The "Krip Hop" series appeared on KPFA's Pushing Limits, which focuses on news, arts, and culture for the disabled community. The series' popularity inspired Moore to create Krip Hop Nation for disabled musicians, since little cultural work or music by people with disabilities had been recognized. "The Krip-Hop movement really makes the pain of the people feel visible", Moore said. "It goes a lot deeper than what people can see."

== Krip Hop Nation ==
The primary goal of Krip Hop Nation is to increase awareness in music and media outlets of the talents, history, and rights of people with disabilities in the hip-hop industry. In an interview, Moore expressed the hope that by listening to his music the audience would understand the need to question authority and the information provided to them. He said he wanted his listeners to learn about their community and to become open to all people. Issues such as racism and sexism are commonly discussed, and Moore hoped that people would examine possible ableism in their attitudes. According to Moore, Krip Hop Nation goes beyond producing music and the bling-bling associated with hip hop; the movement is about advocacy, education, and overcoming oppression. For Moore, the movement has sought to reclaim negative terms associated with disability, such as "crazy", "lame", "retarded", and "cripple", using them to shock people into understanding and respecting the disabled African American community. Krip Hop Nation addresses discrimination against disabled artists in hip hop by publishing articles and hosting events, lectures, and workshops.

ABILITY Magazine has described Krip Hop Nation as a crossroads of music, disability, diversity, community, and political action associated with Moore and Keith Jones. In a 2023 book chapter, Moore and Jones discuss Krip-Hop Nation in relation to music, history, politics, language, theory, Black disabled community, and Hip-Hop scholarship.

Moore has explained that "Krip Hop" is a play on "Hip Hop". Although the "Krip" part of the name refers to "crippled", it is spelled with a "k" to avoid association with the Crips.

== Accomplishments ==
Krip Hop Nation has released two mixtape CDs, held conferences with the PeaceOut HomoHop organization at UC Berkeley and New York University, organized and hosted a six-artist performance in Sacramento, California, staged a show at Disability and Deaf Arts (DADA) in Liverpool, and hosted a Krip Hop Nation conference in Atlanta, Georgia, for Black History Month in 2011 featuring musicians, writers, and activists.

In February 2012, DJ Quad of 5th Battalion joined Krip Hop Nation to co-produce a CD with 17 disabled artists from the UK, the US, and Germany on police brutality and profiling. Among the collaborators was Emmitt Thrower of Artist Magnet. The documentary was scheduled for release in 2014.

Krip-Hop Nation contributed to the title track for the 2020 Netflix documentary Rising Phoenix, about the Paralympic Games. The International Paralympic Committee reported that the song was written and performed by composer Daniel Pemberton and Krip-Hop Nation. The Guardian reported that Pemberton contacted Moore while looking for disabled rappers for the project, and that Moore introduced him to George Doman, Keith Jones, and Toni Hickman. United States Artists identifies Moore as a 2021 Emmy Award winner and founder of Krip-Hop Nation.

In 2022, San Francisco State University hosted a Krip-Hop Nation event featuring Toni Hickman, Keith Jones, Leroy F. Moore Jr., DJ Quad, and Wheelchair Sports Camp.

== Krip-Hop Institute ==
Moore has also described plans for a Krip-Hop Institute, a cultural center focused on Black disabled art, activism, and history. In a 2021 article published by the University of Minnesota's Institute on Community Integration, Moore described the Institute as a space intended to bring artists together and explore the political history of Black and Brown disabled artists. In 2025, the University of Denver's Vicki Myhren Gallery presented a Krip-Hop exhibition featuring artwork by Moore and Ace Robles.

== Notable musicians ==
Krip Hop Nation includes artists such as Counterclockwise, Preach-man, Wheelchair Sports Camp, Miss Money, and Fezo. Kalyn Heffernan is a rapper from Denver, Colorado. With brittle bone disease, Heffernan is 3 feet 6 inches (107 cm) tall and uses a wheelchair. She heads Wheelchair Sports Camp, an experimental hip-hop group with jazz and avant-garde influences. Her raps are political, with many discussing the difficulties she faces as a disabled person in America. Heffernan created beats for Haitian rappers in the area dealing with extreme poverty after the 2010 earthquake. In July 2017, she was arrested after a three-day sitdown protest at her GOP senator's office, remarking, "I'd rather go to jail than to die without Medicaid" in regard to Trumpcare.

Krip Hop Nation has also worked with or featured artists including Keith Jones, Toni Hickman, George Doman, DJ Quad, and Wheelchair Sports Camp.

== See also ==
- Dance therapy
- Disability
- Hip hop
- POOR Magazine
