= Beyond Survival (anthology) =

2020 anthology

Beyond Survival: Strategies and Stories from the Transformative Justice Movement
- Editor: Ejeris Dixon and Leah Lakshmi Piepzna-Samarasinha
- Language: English
- Publisher: AK Press
- Publication date: January 21, 2020
- Publication place: United States
- Pages: 260
- ISBN: 978-1-84935-362-5

Beyond Survival: Strategies and Stories from the Transformative Justice Movement is a 2020 anthology co-edited by Ejeris Dixon and Leah Lakshmi Piepzna-Samarasinha and published by AK Press. The book is an anthology of essays, interviews, and toolkits on transformative justice, a community-based alternative to policing and incarceration.

In 2021, Beyond Survival was a finalist for the Lambda Literary Award for Anthology.

== Contents ==
Beyond Survival is organized into four sections. The first, "Making the Road by Dreaming," draws on the Black community in New Orleans where Dixon's mother grew up in the 1940s and 1950s, where neighbors intervened in incidents of domestic violence in place of the police. The second section, "We Got This," compiles practical tools for transformative justice practitioners, including accountability-process outlines, network mapping exercises, scripts, and intervention guidelines. The third section, "We Didn't Call It TJ, but Maybe It Worked Anyway?," focuses on accountability work and examines themes such as guilt, shame, and the overlap between being a survivor and having caused harm. The closing section, "What Did We Dream Then, What Do We Know Now?," features reflections from organizers who helped develop the transformative justice movement in the 1990s and 2000s. Throughout the book, personal narratives are interleaved with handbook-style guides and interviews.

Notable contributions include Mia Mingus's chapter on a framework for identifying community support networks, Kai Cheng Thom's guide to holding people who cause harm accountable while challenging the victim-perpetrator binary, Mariame Kaba's discussion on how centering survivors is compatible with recognizing that those who cause harm are often themselves survivors of abuse, and Leah Lakshmi Piepzna-Samarasinha's chapter on "Cripping TJ," which examined the toll of transformative justice work on practitioners who are often survivors themselves and argued for integrating disability justice practices to sustain them.

Contributors include adrienne maree brown, Alexis Pauline Gumbs, Trans Lifeline, the Audre Lorde Project, the Icarus Project, and Mijente, among others.

== Reception ==
Writing in the Journal of Transformative Education, Carol Rogers-Shaw described the anthology as drawing on a wide range of voices within the movement, including those who had been harmed and those who had caused harm, and argued that the resulting disagreements among contributors strengthened rather than weakened the book. Rogers-Shaw found the book's organization difficult to follow at times, but attributed this to the interconnected nature of the topics rather than to editorial oversight.

In Toward Freedom, Lesley Becker described the anthology as a collection of approximately three dozen first-hand accounts and positioned the book within ongoing discussions of community safety raised by the defund the police movement. Becker noted that contributors framed transformative justice not as a direct replacement for the criminal justice system but as a set of practices to build community safety systems.
