= Beyond Survival =

Beyond Survival may refer to:

- Beyond Survival (TV series), a Canadian documentary television show
- Beyond Survival (anthology), a 2020 anthology on transformative justice
