= Massey Hill Classical High School =

Historic school building in North Carolina, United States

Massey Hill Classical High School (MHCHS)
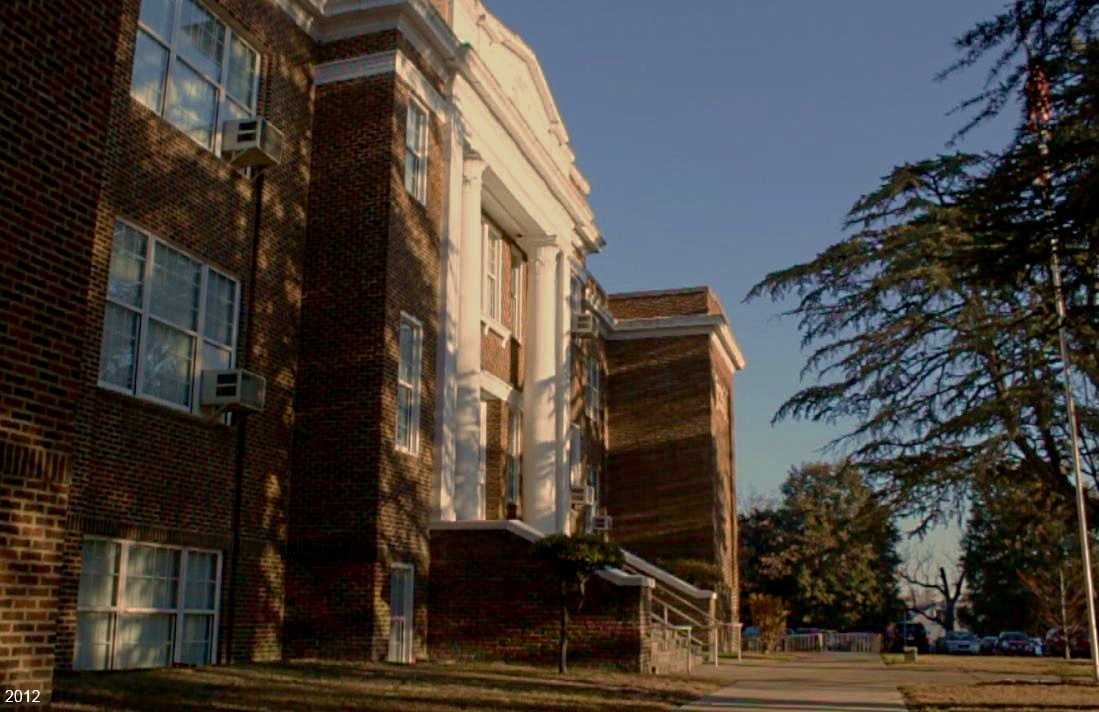

Location
- 1062 Southern Avenue; Fayetteville, North Carolina 28306; United States; 35°1′51″N 78°53′42″W
- Massey Hill High School
- U.S. National Register of Historic Places
- Location within North Carolina Location within the United States
- Location: 1062 Southern Ave., Fayetteville, North Carolina
- Area: 6.6 acres (2.7 ha)
- Built: 1925
- Architect: Dixon, Stiles S.; Dietrick, William H. et al.
- Architectural style: Classical Revival
- NRHP reference No.: 04001387
- Added to NRHP: December 23, 2004

Information
- Type: Public, School-of-Choice
- Established: 1925 (101 years ago)
- School district: Cumberland County Schools
- CEEB code: 341314
- Principal: Dr. Catherine Abraham-Johnson
- Grades: 9–12
- Enrollment: 295 (2023-2024)
- Colors: Hunter green and white
- Mascot: Pirate
- Website: mhchs.ccs.k12.nc.us

Massey Hill Classical High School (MHCHS) is a high school in Fayetteville, Cumberland County, North Carolina. The main building of the Massey Hill Classical High School was built in 1925. It is a two-story brick building on a raised basement in the Classical Revival-style. What is now known as the Science Building was added in 1942 and eventually expanded to twelve classrooms. The gymnasium was built in 1947. The gymnasium has served as a community recreation center and is still used by the Recreation Department for evening basketball.

In 2004 Massey Hill was entered in the National Register of Historic Places by the United States Department of the Interior.

== Notable alumni ==
- Tony Chavonne, former mayor of Fayetteville
- La'Shanda Renee Hawkins, the first African American female helicopter pilot in the U.S. Coast Guard
- Stacey Milbern, disability rights activist that served on the President's Committee for People with Intellectual Disabilities
- Terry Luck, American football player for the Cleveland Browns and Nebraska Cornhuskers
- Jacquelyn Smith Warner, former mayor of Hope Mills, North Carolina
