= Stacey Milbern =

Korean-American disability activist (1987–2020)

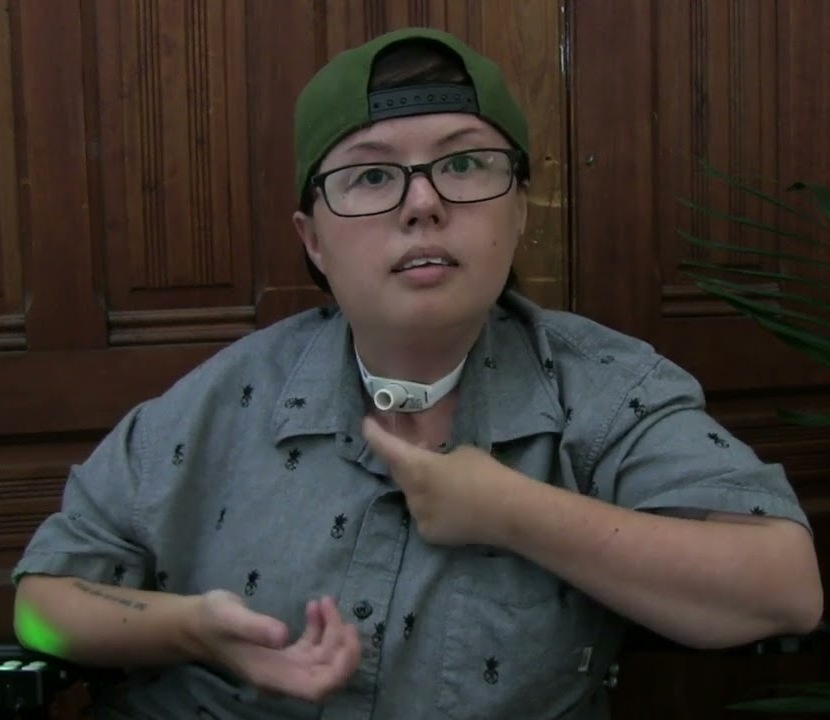
- Stacey Park Milbern in 2017
- Born: Stacey Park Milbern; May 19, 1987; Seoul, South Korea
- Died: May 19, 2020 (aged 33); Stanford, California, U.S.
- Education: Methodist University (BA); Mills College (MBA)
- Occupation: Disability rights activist
- Years active: 2003–2020

Stacey Park Milbern (May 19, 1987 – May 19, 2020) was a South Korean and American activist for disability justice, advocating for fair treatment of those with disability in the United States. She served on the North Carolina Commission for the Blind and the Statewide Independent Living Council, as well as the President's Committee for People with Intellectual Disabilities under U.S. president Barack Obama. She also helped establish Disability History and Awareness Month in North Carolina. In March 2020, she engaged in mutual aid to provide food and medical care to homeless and disabled people in the San Francisco Bay Area during the COVID-19 pandemic before dying from surgical complications related to kidney cancer in May of that year.

== Early life ==
Milbern was born at the U.S. Army Hospital in Seoul on May 19, 1987, with ullrich congenital muscular dystrophy (CMD). She was mixed-race, her father being White American and her mother being South Korean. She grew up in Fort Bragg, North Carolina, in a military family, as her father was in the United States Army. As a child she relied on her family as caregivers, but when she began to identify as queer, she feared her parents' judgment and planned to move out, a choice made more difficult by her need for help in daily activities such as eating, sleeping, and using the bathroom. She attended Massey Hill Classical High School in Fayetteville, North Carolina.

Milbern began serving in disability rights leadership roles at 16 years old, including as Community Outreach Director for the National Youth Leadership Network. She later was a founder of the North Carolina Youth Leadership Forum. She was appointed by the Governor of North Carolina to the North Carolina Commission for the Blind from 2006 to 2008 and to the Statewide Independent Living Council from 2004 to 2010. She was instrumental in the writing and passing of the 2007 North Carolina law establishing October as "Disability History and Awareness Month" and requiring disability history curriculum to be taught in all schools. In 2005, Milbern helped to establish the disability justice movement through conversations with other disabled queer women of color activists.

Milbern authored a popular disability-rights blog on WordPress throughout the late 2000s, titled "Crip Chick" (later CripChick.com). She graduated from Methodist University in 2009.

== San Francisco Bay Area ==
Milbern moved to the San Francisco Bay Area when she was 24, due to the area being "one of the most accessible places for people with physical disabilities". The Bay Area had been the historical center of the disability rights movement, and there she continued to organize, write, and speak for the movement, becoming the director of programs at the Center for Independent Living, Berkeley. California ranks highly among the states for spending on in-home care benefits, and she was able to obtain Medicaid support for an in-home attendant, enabling her to live independently in Oakland and hold a position in human resources at Wells Fargo, a financial banking company. She credited that nursing assistance for her ability to remain active in the community and avoid institutionalization in a nursing home. She contrasted her independence and the care she was able to receive in California against her experiences in North Carolina, and defended the necessity of Medicaid programs funding home attendant and nursing services against reductions proposed during efforts to repeal and replace the Affordable Care Act. Milbern advocated for fair medical care for people with disabilities, including both access and biases in the system, speaking against unnecessary surgery.

In 2014, Milbern was appointed by Barack Obama to the President's Committee for People with Intellectual Disabilities. She advised the Obama administration for two years. She earned a Master of Business Administration degree from Mills College in 2015. She also served as an impact producer on the 2020 documentary film Crip Camp.

In early March 2020, as the COVID-19 pandemic spread to the Bay Area, Milbern and four friends constituting the Disability Justice Culture Club distributed homemade disease-prevention kits, including hand sanitizer, disinfectant, and respirators, to residents of Oakland homeless encampments. She raised concerns for the well-being of the community and its most vulnerable members. Milbern noted her DIY solution as an example of "crip—or crippled—wisdom". She warned that the pandemic's demands on health services threatened her community's access to dialysis and other life-saving treatments needed by some to survive. Her group also organized a mutual aid campaign, providing food and care support for disabled people in need. Milbern continued pandemic relief work despite her own growing health problems.

== Death and legacy ==
Towards the end of her life, she experienced additional health problems. Surgery to remove her fast-growing kidney cancer was postponed during the COVID-19 pandemic due to shelter-in-place orders. Milbern died at Stanford hospital on her 33rd birthday, May 19, 2020, due to surgical complications.

Milbern was featured in the Google Doodle on May 19, 2022, which would have been her 35th birthday. Milbern is depicted on a U.S. quarter released in 2025 as part of the final year of the American Women quarters collection. On October 25, 2025, Milbern was inducted into the hall of fame of Massey Hill Classical High School.
