= The Revolution Starts at Home =

2011 anthology

- Editor: Ching-In Chen, Jai Dulani, and Leah Lakshmi Piepzna-Samarasinha
- Publisher: South End Press
- Publication date: 2011
- ISBN: 978-0-89608-794-1

The Revolution Starts at Home: Confronting Intimate Violence Within Activist Communities is a 2011 anthology edited by Ching-In Chen, Jai Dulani, and Leah Lakshmi Piepzna-Samarasinha.
