= Karen Tongson =

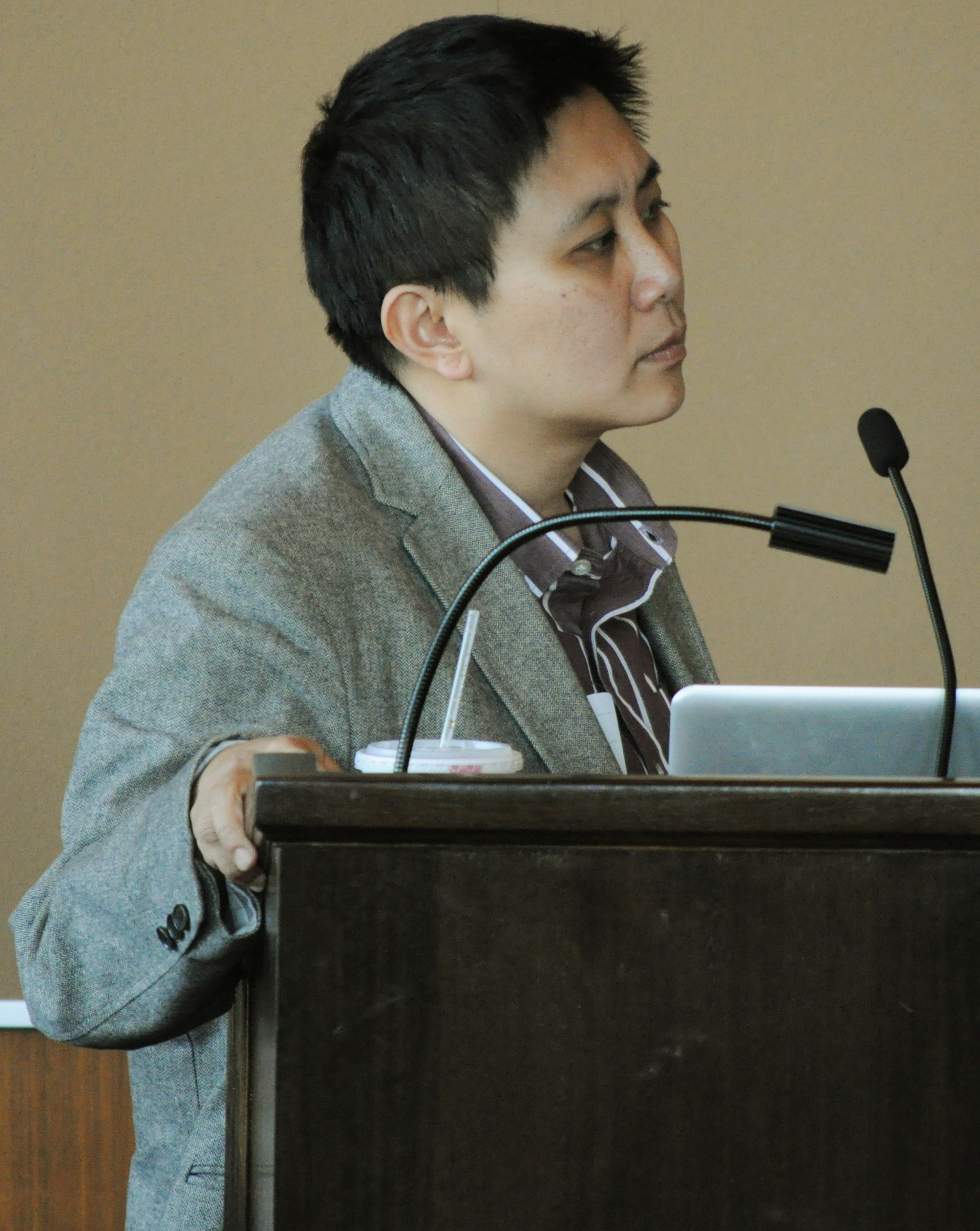
Karen Tongson (2011)

Karen Tongson (born August 23, 1973, in Manila, Philippines) is a Filipino-American cultural critic, writer and queer studies scholar. She is the author of Relocations: Queer Suburban Imaginaries (NYU Press, August 2011), co-editor of the book series Postmillennial Pop (with Henry Jenkins), and co-editor-in-chief of the Journal of Popular Music Studies (with Gustavus Stadler). She is also the events editor for the journal, American Quarterly. In 2019, she won Lambda Literary's Jeanne Córdova Prize for Lesbian/Queer Nonfiction.

Born in Manila, Philippines on August 23, 1973, to one of the nation's founding families of Latin jazz—the Katindig family—Tongson immigrated to the U.S in the early 1980s and became a U.S. citizen in 1989.

Tongson is currently an Associate Professor of English and Gender Studies at the University of Southern California, where she teaches courses on gender and popular culture, comparative minority discourse, suburban sexualities, empires and regionalism, California cultures, queer studies, and nineteenth-century British literature.

She received her B.A. in English from the University of California, Los Angeles in 1995, and her Ph.D. in English from the University of California, Berkeley in 2003. At UCLA, Tongson won the Joseph and Erile R. Thompson Prize for Outstanding Undergraduate Honors Thesis. After receiving her Ph.D. at Berkeley, Tongson held a University of California President's Postdoctoral fellowship in Literature at the University of California, San Diego (2003-2005), and a postdoctoral fellowship with the University of California Humanities Research Institute (UCHRI) at the University of California, Irvine (2004-2005). From 2007-2010, Tongson collaborated on the blog OH! INDUSTRY with other co-founders Christine Bacareza Balance and Alexandra Vazquez. Oh! Industry has been acknowledged as a groundbreaking scholarly blog about popular culture, race and sexuality.

Tongson's work has appeared in a range of print and online publications including Social Text, Novel: A Forum on Fiction, GLQ, Nineteenth-Century Literature, the anthologies Queering the Popular Pitch, and The Blackwell Companion to Lesbian, Gay, Bisexual, Transgender and Queer Studies, as well as the French magazine, les Incrockuptibles. She curated a Glee theme-week for In Media Res in April 2010, and is a co-host of the weekly podcast Pop Rocket.

== Works ==
- Normporn: Queer Viewers and the TV That Soothes Us. New York : New York University Press, 2023. ISBN 9781479841929
- Why Karen Carpenter Matters. Austin : University of Texas Press, 2019. ISBN 9781477318843, OCLC 1050454964
- Tongson, K., See, S. E., Gonzalves, T., Linmark, R. Z. (2013). Migrant Musicians: Filipino Entertainers and the Work of Music Making (limited edition). Durham, NC: Horse and Buggy Press.
- Relocations: Queer Suburban Imaginaries. New York : New York Univ. Press, 2011. ISBN 9780814783092, OCLC 750961066
