= Bodymap =

2015 poetry collection by Leah Lakshmi Piepzna-Samarasinha

Bodymap: Poems is a 2015 poetry collection by Canadian-American writer and activist Leah Lakshmi Piepzna-Samarasinha.

Bodymap was a finalist for the 2016 Audre Lorde Award for Lesbian Poetry.
