= Dirty River =

2016 book by Leah Lakshmi Piepzna-Samarasinha

- Author: Leah Lakshmi Piepzna-Samarasinha
- Publisher: Arsenal Pulp Press
- Publication date: 2016
- ISBN: 978-1-55152-600-3

Dirty River: A Queer Femme of Color Dreaming Her Way Home is a 2016 autobiographical book by Canadian-American writer and activist Leah Lakshmi Piepzna-Samarasinha.

In 2016, Dirty River was a finalist for the Judy Grahn Award for Lesbian Nonfiction and Lambda Literary Award for Lesbian Memoir or Biography. It was also included in the top 10 for the American Library Association's Over the Rainbow Project Book List.
