= Crip Camp =

2020 documentary film by Nicole Newnham and James Lebrecht

- Official release poster
- Directed by: Nicole Newnham; James Lebrecht
- Written by: Nicole Newnham; James Lebrecht
- Produced by: Nicole Newnham; James Lebrecht; Sara Bolder
- Cinematography: Justin Schein
- Edited by: Andrew Gersh; Eileen Meyer
- Music by: Bear McCreary
- Production companies: Higher Ground Productions; Rusted Spoke; Little Punk; Just Films; Ford Foundation
- Distributed by: Netflix
- Release dates: January 23, 2020 (Sundance); March 25, 2020 (United States)
- Running time: 108 minutes
- Country: United States
- Language: English

Crip Camp: A Disability Revolution is a 2020 American documentary film directed, written, and co-produced by Nicole Newnham and James LeBrecht. Barack and Michelle Obama served as executive producers under their Higher Ground Productions banner.

Crip Camp had its world premiere at the Sundance Film Festival on January 23, 2020, where it won the Audience Award. It was released on March 25, 2020, by Netflix and received acclaim from critics. It was nominated for an Academy Award for Best Documentary Feature.

== Premise ==
Crip Camp starts in 1971 at Camp Jened, a summer camp in New York described as a "loose, free-spirited camp designed for teens with disabilities". Starring Larry Allison, Judith Heumann, James LeBrecht, Denise Sherer Jacobson, and Stephen Hofmann, the film focuses on those campers who became activists in the disability rights movement and follows their fight for accessibility legislation. Pictures by co-star HolLynn D'Lil were used throughout the film.

== Production ==
The idea to make the film about Camp Jened started "with an offhand comment at lunch." LeBrecht had worked with Newnham for 15 years as a co-director. LeBrecht was born with spina bifida and uses a wheelchair to get around. He had never seen a documentary related to his "life's work as a disability rights advocate". At the end of the lunch meeting, LeBrecht told Newnham, "You know, I've always wanted to see this film made about my summer camp", and she replied, "Oh, that's nice, why?" Newnham told The Guardian, "then he completely blew my mind" explaining why he wanted to make this film. Newnham said:

What Jim and I always felt is that we wanted the film to bring people into the world of Camp Jened, to give them that experience themselves: arriving at camp, checking out the scene, maybe feeling a little bit uncomfortable, not sure what's going on, not sure if they speak the language. Then, over time, they'd come to feel like this is a world that is fun and joyous and liberating for them as viewers, just like it was for Jim. Jim's personal story would bring you into that.

The film was executive produced by Barack and Michelle Obama under their Higher Ground Productions banner. Disability rights activist Stacey Milbern, who had previously served on the President's Committee for People with Intellectual Disabilities under Barack Obama, was an impact producer on the film.

== Release ==
Crip Camp had its world premiere at the Sundance Film Festival on January 23, 2020. The film was released on March 25, 2020, by Netflix. It was set to be released in a limited release the same day, but the theatrical release was canceled due to the COVID-19 pandemic.

== Reception ==
=== Critical response ===
On review aggregator Rotten Tomatoes, the film holds an approval rating of 100% based on 99 reviews, with an average rating of 8.5/10. The website's critics consensus reads: "As entertaining as it is inspiring, Crip Camp uses one group's remarkable story to highlight hope for the future and the power of community." Metacritic, which uses a weighted average, assigned the film a score of 86 out of 100, based on 29 critics, indicating "universal acclaim".

Peter Travers of Rolling Stone wrote, "this indispensable documentary defines what it means to call a movie 'inspiring'." Justin Chang wrote for The Los Angeles Times that the film "delivers an appreciably blunt message". Benjamin Lee of The Guardian wrote, "this impactful film shines a light on a forgotten fight for equality". Daniel Fienberg of The Hollywood Reporter wrote, "My only hope is that the confrontational title and the Obama branding don't scare some viewers away from a story that is truly non-partisan, humane and significant". Peter Debruge wrote for Variety that the film "proves to be the most educational for those born into a post-ADA world, a world of self-opening doors and accessible bathroom stalls and ramps that take wheelchairs into consideration".

Richard Lawson of Vanity Fair wrote, "The spirit of revolution—righteously angry yet full of bonhomie, demanding but generous in its reach—is alive and well in the film. As, one hopes, it is everywhere else". Carlos Ríos Espinosa of Human Rights Watch wrote, "The film made me realize the importance of building spaces for people with disabilities to organize". Katie Rife of The A.V. Club wrote, "[the film] will serve as an enlightening look at how much has changed in the past 50 years". Jake Coyle writing for The Washington Post wrote, "[the film] has a specific starting point but it unfolds as a broader chronicle of a decades-long fight for civil rights—one that has received less attention than other 20th century struggles for equity".

=== Awards and nominations ===
List of awards and nominations received by Crip Camp
Year	Award	Category	Result	Ref(s).
2020	Sundance Film Festival	Audience Award	Won	
2020	Sundance Film Festival	Grand Jury Prize	Nominated	
2020	Miami International Film Festival	Best Documentary	Nominated	
2020	Miami International Film Festival	Zeno Mountain Award	Won	
2020	Critics' Choice Award	Best Documentary Feature	Nominated	
2021	International Documentary Association	Best Feature	Won	
2021	Hollywood Music in Media Awards	Best Original Score in a Documentary	Nominated	
2021	Independent Spirit Awards	Best Documentary Feature	Won	
2021	Academy Awards	Best Documentary Feature	Nominated	
2021	Alfred I. duPont–Columbia University Award		Won	
2021	Austin Film Critics Association	Best Documentary	Nominated	
2021	Peabody Awards	Documentary honoree	Won	

== See also ==
- 2020 in film
- Crip (disability term)
- List of original films distributed by Netflix
