= James LeBrecht =

American film director

James LeBrecht (born May 8, 1956) is a filmmaker, sound designer, and disability rights activist. He currently lives in Oakland, California.

== Early life ==
James LeBrecht was born in New York with spina bifida, a neural tube defect. This made him unable to use his legs. At 14 years old, he began to attend Camp Jened during the summer, where he befriended teens with disabilities and felt empowered as a disabled youth. He later became a member of Disabled in Action. He attended the University of California, San Diego, where he helped form the Disabled Student Union.

== Career ==
After college, LeBrecht relocated to Berkeley, California, where the disability rights movement was developing at the Center for Independent Living. In Berkeley, he worked as a sound designer. He began his career at the Berkeley Repertory Theater, where he worked for ten years. In the 1980s, LeBrecht obtained an apprenticeship at a post-production facility, which let him break into film. Over the years, LeBrecht has done sound design work for over 145 films, with a particular focus on documentary films. His filmography includes Minding the Gap, The Waiting Room, The Island President, The Kill Team, Audrie & Daisy, Battlefield Earth, and Dragon: The Bruce Lee Story. He is the founder of Berkeley Sound Artists and co-author of Sound and Music for the Theater: the art and technique of design with Deena Kaye.

He is a former board member of the Disability Rights Education & Defense Fund.

== Crip Camp ==
LeBrecht and Nicole Newnham are co-directors of Crip Camp (2020), an award-winning documentary. The film was executive produced by Barack Obama and Michelle Obama through Higher Ground, their production company The film tells the story of Camp Jened and its impact upon the disability rights movement. In 2020, the film won the Audience Award at the Sundance Film Festival and the Zeno Mountain Award at the Miami Film Festival.
