= Jeanne Córdova Prize =

LGBT literary award

The Jeanne Córdova Prize for Lesbian/Queer Nonfiction, established in 2018, is an annual literary award presented by the Lambda Literary Foundation to honor Jeanne Córdova. The award is granted to "lesbian/queer-identified women and trans/gender non-conforming nonfiction authors ... committed to nonfiction work that captures the depth and complexity of lesbian/queer life, culture, and/or history." Winners must have "published at least one book and show promise in continuing to produce groundbreaking and challenging work." Winners receive a $2,500 cash prize.

== Recipients ==
Year	Recipient	Ref.
2018	Melissa Febos	
2019	Karen Tongson	
2020	Leah Lakshmi Piepzna-Samarasinha	
2021	Nancy Agabian	
2022	Aisha Sabatini Sloan	
2023	Jaquira Díaz	
