= The Future Is Disabled =

2022 book by Leah Lakshmi Piepzna-Samarasinha

- Author: Leah Lakshmi Piepzna-Samarasinha
- Publisher: Arsenal Pulp Press
- Publication date: 2022
- ISBN: 978-1-55152-891-5

The Future is Disabled: Prophecies, Love Notes and Mourning Songs is a 2022 non-fiction book by Canadian-American author and activist Leah Lakshmi Piepzna-Samarasinha. According to Ms., the book "blur[s] the lines between memoir, political essay, rant and eulogy, all of them united by the conviction that every body, mind, race and gender matter."

== Background ==
Piepzna-Samarasinha began writing The Future is Disabled in 2018.
