= Melissa Febos =

American writer

- Born: Falmouth, Massachusetts
- Education: The New School (BA); Sarah Lawrence College (MFA)
- Occupations: Writer and professor
- Spouse: Donika Kelly
- Writing career
- Genres: Non-fiction, memoir
- Notable awards: National Book Critics Circle Award (2021); NEA Fellowship (2022); Guggenheim Fellow (2022)
- Website: www.melissafebos.com

Melissa Febos is an American writer and professor. She is the author of five books, including the memoirs Whip Smart (2010) and The Dry Season (2025). Her essay collection Girlhood (2021) won the 2021 National Book Critics Circle Award.

She has had work featured in The New York Times, The Paris Review, Salon, Bomb, Hunger Mountain, Prairie Schooner, The Kenyon Review, Tin House, Granta, Post Road, Dissent, Vogue, The Believer, The New Yorker, The Sewanee Review, Bitch Magazine, The Guardian, and The Chronicle of Higher Education.

== Early life and education ==
Febos was born and raised in Falmouth, Massachusetts. Her father was a sea captain and her mother was a therapist. She left home at 16 years old, after passing the GED, and moved to Boston, where she worked an assortment of jobs including one as a boatyard hand and another as a chambermaid.

She attended night courses at Harvard Extension School before moving to New York City and enrolling in The New School in August 1999. She graduated with a Bachelor of Arts in Writing/Literature in 2003. She later earned a Master of Fine Arts in Writing at Sarah Lawrence College.

== Career ==
Febos is the author of Whip Smart, published by St. Martin's Press in 2010, a memoir of her work as a professional dominatrix while she was studying at The New School. Kirkus Reviews noted "In lesser hands this could be a maudlin, salacious tale, but Febos’s electrifying prose and unremitting honesty continually challenge the reader."

Her second book, the lyric essay collection Abandon Me, was published by Bloomsbury Publishing on February 28, 2017. In a starred review, Publishers Weekly called the book "part lovesick devotional and part meditation on the intersection between desire and identity." Abandon Me was a Lambda Literary Award finalist and a Publishing Triangle Award finalist. It was named one of "The Best Reviewed Books of 2017" by Literary Hub.

In May 2018, Febos received the inaugural Lambda Literary Jeanne Córdova Prize for Lesbian/Queer Nonfiction. "The award goes to a writer committed to nonfiction work that captures the depth and complexity of lesbian/queer life, culture and/or history."

Her third book and second essay collection, Girlhood, was published by Bloomsbury Publishing on March 30, 2021. It was a national bestseller. Describing Girlhood, The New York Times wrote, "The aim of this book, though, is not simply to tell about her own life, but to listen to the pulses of many others’...This solidarity puts “Girlhood” in a feminist canon that includes Febos’s idol, Adrienne Rich, and Maggie Nelson's theory-minded masterpieces: smart, radical company, and not ordinary at all." Each of the book's essays features an illustration by artist Forsyth Harmon.

She was the co-curator, with Rebecca Keith, of the monthly Mixer Reading and Music series on the Lower East Side for ten years. A four-time MacDowell Colony fellow, Febos has received fellowships from Virginia Center for the Creative Arts, Vermont Studio Center, and the Bread Loaf Writers' Conference. Her essays have won awards from Prairie Schooner and StoryQuarterly, and for five years she was on the Board of Directors of Vida: Women in Literary Arts.

Febos's third essay collection, Body Work: The Radical Power of Personal Narrative, combines memoir and craft advice, and was published by Catapult in 2022. Kirkus Reviews starred review described the book as a "strongly worded manifesto—despite her claim on the first page that it is not a manifesto. In fact, her impassioned theses and proclamations about writing are exactly that... She further points out that memoirists do not publish raw therapeutic diaries but crafted literary works with the power to change the world." Cleveland Review of Books noted that the collection "examines the intersection of trauma, art-making, and social change. The book is a call to action, a protest song, an organizing principle, and perhaps the only book you need on memoir writing."

The Dry Season, her second memoir, was published by Alfred A. Knopf in 2025. The book received a starred review from Kirkus Reviews, which noted: "Although a book about abstention, at its essence this story is about understanding, reclaiming, and celebrating pleasure, rendered sublimely and with wit. A gorgeous and thought-provoking memoir about how celibacy can teach us about love."

Febos has taught at SUNY Purchase College, the Gotham Writers' Workshop, The New School, Sarah Lawrence College, New York University, and Utica College. Until 2020, she was an Associate Professor and MFA Director at Monmouth University. She currently holds the Roy J. Carver Professorship at the University of Iowa, where she is Director of the Nonfiction Writing Program.

== Reception ==
Abandon Me was one of "The Best Reviewed Books of 2017." It was a Lambda Literary Award and Publishing Triangle Award finalist. The New Yorker called it "mesmerizing" and wrote that "the sheer fearlessness of the narrative is captivating."

Girlhood was featured on Morning Joe on MSNBC, and was well-reviewed by NPR. Girlhood won the 2021 National Book Critics Circle Award in Criticism. Body Work was a national bestseller and made the "Best Books of 2022" list by NPR.

Her fifth book, The Dry Season, was featured on TIME Magazine's "The 100 Must-Read Books of 2025" and Vulture's "The Best Books of 2025." It was a finalist for the 2026 Lambda Literary Awards for Lesbian Memoir/Biography.

== Personal life ==
Febos is queer. She lives in Iowa with her wife, the poet Donika Kelly.

She spoke at House of SpeakEasy's Seriously Entertaining program about her childhood and rethinking often-normalized experiences of bullying.

== Awards ==
- 2010 MacDowell Colony Fellowship
- 2011 MacDowell Colony Fellowship
- 2012 Bread Loaf Writers' Conference Fellowship
- 2013 Prairie Schooner Creative Nonfiction Prize
- 2013 Barbara Deming Memorial Fund Fellowship
- 2014 Virginia Center for Creative Arts Fellowship
- 2014 Story Quarterly Essay Prize
- 2014 MacDowell Colony Fellowship
- 2015 Center for Women Writers Creative Nonfiction Prize
- 2015 Lower Manhattan Cultural Council Process Space Residency
- 2015 Vermont Studio Center Fellowship
- 2017 Ragdale Residency
- 2018 Lower Manhattan Cultural Council Sarah Verdone Writing Award
- 2018 Lambda Literary Award finalist in Memoir/Biography
- 2018 finalist for the Judy Grahn Award
- 2018 Jeanne Córdova Prize
- 2018 BAU Institute Fellowship at the Camargo Foundation
- 2018 Vermont Studio Center Fellowship
- 2021 MacDowell Colony Fellowship
- 2021 National Book Critics Circle Award in criticism
- 2022 National Endowment for the Arts Literature Fellowship
- 2022 Guggenheim Fellowship in Nonfiction

== Publications ==
=== Memoirs ===
- Whip Smart. New York, New York: St. Martin's Press. 2010. ISBN 9780312583781.
- The Dry Season: A Memoir of Pleasure in a Year Without Sex. New York, New York: Knopf. 2025. ISBN 9780593537237.

=== Essay Collections ===
- Abandon Me. New York, New York: Bloomsbury USA. 2017. ISBN 9781632866585.
- Girlhood. New York, New York: Bloomsbury USA. 2021. ISBN 9781635572520.
- Body Work. New York, New York: Catapult Publishing. 2022. ISBN 9781646220854.
