= Terry Luck =

American football player (born 1952)

No. 7
- Position: Quarterback

Personal information
- Born: December 14, 1952 (age 73); Fayetteville, North Carolina, U.S.
- Listed height: 6 ft 3 in (1.91 m)
- Listed weight: 205 lb (93 kg)

Career information
- High school: Massey Hill (Fayetteville)
- College: Nebraska
- NFL draft: 1976: undrafted

Career history
- Cleveland Browns (1976–1977)

Career NFL statistics
- Passing attempts: 50
- Passing completions: 25
- Completion percentage: 50.0%
- TD–INT: 1–7
- Passing yards: 316
- Passer rating: 37.2
- Stats at Pro Football Reference

Terry Lee Luck (born December 14, 1952) is an American former professional football player who was a quarterback for the Cleveland Browns of the National Football League.

Luck attended Massey Hill Classical High School, and was inaugurated into the school's Hall of Fame in 2025. He played college football for the Nebraska Cornhuskers.
