= Donika Kelly =

American poet (born early 1980s)

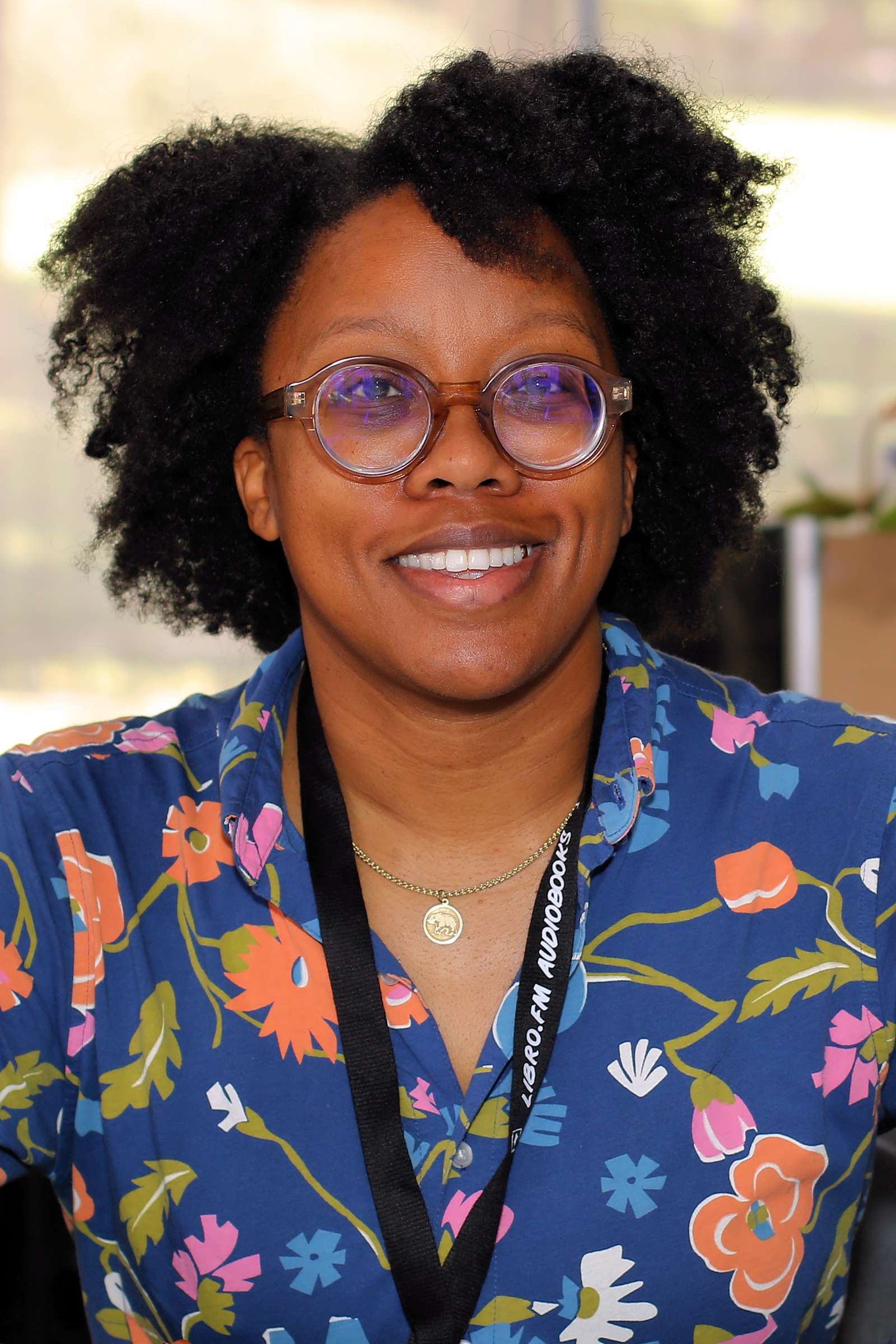
- Kelly at the 2025 Texas Book Festival
- Born: early 1980s Los Angeles, California, U.S.
- Education: Southern Arkansas University (BA); University of Texas at Austin (MFA); Vanderbilt University (MA, PhD)
- Occupations: Academic and poet
- Spouse: Melissa Febos
- Writing career
- Notable works: The Renunciations; Bestiary
- Notable awards: Hurston/Wright Legacy Award (2017); Anisfield-Wolf Book Award (2022); NEA Fellowship (2023)
- Website: donikakelly.com

Donika Kelly is an American poet and academic. She is the author of the chapbook Aviarium (2017) and three full-length poetry collections Bestiary (2016), The Renunciations (2021), and The Natural Order of Things (2025).

== Early life and education ==
Kelly was born in Los Angeles, California in the early 1980s and moved with her family to Arkansas in the late 1990s. Her family still lives there.

In 2005, Kelly received her Bachelor of Arts in English from Southern Arkansas University. She received a Master of Fine Arts from the Michener Center for Writers at the University of Texas at Austin in 2008. Her thesis was called The White Meat.

In 2009, she obtained a Master of Arts from Vanderbilt University. Her thesis, Framing the Subject in Natasha Trethewey's Bellocq's Ophelia, analyzed Natasha Trethewey's book on Ernest J. Bellocq's photography, specifically those of unnamed mixed-race prostitutes. Kelly finished her Ph.D. in English literature from Vanderbilt University in August 2013, where she specialized in American literature and film studies. Her dissertation was titled Reading against Genre: Contemporary Westerns and the Problem of White Manhood. In it, Kelly explains how the way in which society perceives the role of white men is largely influenced by the way they are portrayed in media, with a particular focus on contemporary Western films.

== Career ==
Her poems have been published in The New Yorker, The Atlantic, Foglifter, The Paris Review, Gulf Coast, Indiana Review, The Virginia Quarterly Review, and elsewhere. She is a contributor to the 2019 anthology New Daughters of Africa, edited by Margaret Busby.

Kelly's first collection, Bestiary, was published by Graywolf Press in 2016. The book won the 2015 Cave Canem Poetry Prize, 2017 Hurston/Wright Legacy Award for Poetry, and 2018 Kate Tufts Discovery Award. The collection received a starred review from Publishers Weekly, which called the book "astounding". Bestiary was longlisted for the National Book Award in 2016. It was a finalist for the Lambda Literary Award and a Publishing Triangle Award in 2017.

Her second collection, The Renunciations, was published in 2021. It won the 2022 Anisfield-Wolf Book Award for Poetry. It was a finalist for the 2021 National Book Critics Circle Award for Poetry. In a starred review, Publishers Weekly noted that "Kelly explores in her powerful latest the tenuous line between desire and trauma in poems that ache with memory and revelation" and called the collection "devastating".

Kelly is a Cave Canem Foundation Graduate Fellow. She is the recipient of a Lannan Residency fellowship and a fellowship to the Fine Arts Work Center in Provincetown, Massachusetts. She received a 2023 National Endowment for the Arts Fellowship for Poetry, and won the 2025 Pushcart Prize.

She published her third poetry collection, The Natural Order of Things, in October 2025. It was named a "Best Book of the Year" by The New Yorker. Kurt Millberger for The Headlight Review wrote "Like the emerald cicada that adorns the cover, buried for years in the earth, Kelly’s poems emerge with a deep desire to sing. And sing they do, of family, of trauma, of the hearsay of history, and of the weight of white supremacy and American empire. Through it all, these poems sing of love...a wonder to hear and behold."

Kelly is an Associate Professor of English at the University of Iowa, where she teaches creative writing. She has previously taught at the City University of New York's Baruch College and St. Bonaventure University.

== Personal life ==
She lives in Iowa with her wife, the writer Melissa Febos.

== Awards and honors ==
- National Book Award, Longlist, 2016
- Bucknell Seminar for Younger Poets, June Fellow, 2004
- James A. Michener Fellow in Writing, 2005–2008
- Provost's Graduate Fellowship, Vanderbilt University, 2008–2013
- University Fellowship, Vanderbilt University, 2008–2013
- Cave Canem Graduate Fellow, 2009, 2011, 2013
- Thomas Daniel Young Award for Excellence in Teaching, Vanderbilt, 2013
- Bayard Rustin Advocacy Award, Office of LGBTQI Life, Vanderbilt, 2015
- Cave Canem Poetry Prize, Winner, 2015
- Anisfield-Wolf Book Award, 2022
- National Endowment for the Arts Fellowship for Poetry, 2023
- Pushcart Prize, 2025

== Publications ==
=== Poetry ===
Collections

- Bestiary. Graywolf Press. 2016. ISBN 9781555977580.
- The Renunciations. Graywolf Press. 2021. ISBN 9781644450536.
- The Natural Order of Things. Graywolf Press. 2025. ISBN 9781644453599.

Chapbooks

- Aviarium (Fivehundred Places, 2017)

List of poems

Title	Year	First published	Reprinted/collected
From the catalogue of cruelty	2020	Kelly, Donika (January 6, 2020). "From the catalogue of cruelty". The New Yorker. Vol. 95, no. 43. pp. 22–23.	

- "Sanctuary", "Where We End Up" and "Brood", in Margaret Busby (ed.), New Daughters of Africa, 2019.
- "Bedtime Story for the Bruised Heart", "Cartography as an Act of Remembering", "The Three Birds of the Milky Way" and "Labyrinth", Sinister Wisdom, 2017
- "The Oracle Remembers the Future Cannot Be Avoided", "Gun Control (Mama)", and "Primer: D'Aulaire's Book of Greek Myths", Tin House, 2017
- "In the Chapel of St. Mary's" and "Self-Portrait in Labyrinth", Washington Square, 2017
- "Partial Hospitalization", Buzzfeed Reader, 2016
- "Love Poem: Chimera", Gulf Coast, 2016
- "Construction", "Revelation: Black Bear", "Revelation: White Bear", and "Pony", Rockhurst Review, 2016
- "Bower Bird", "Swallow", and "How to Be Alone", Virginia Quarterly Review, 2016
- "Love Poem: Centaur" and "Love Poem Mermaid", Pleiades, 2016
- "Fourth Grade Autobiography", Nashville Review, 2016
- "Handsome Is", "Little Box", and "Love Letter", Gris-Gris, 2016
- "Acheron" and "Hymn", Cincinnati Review, 2015
- "Ocelot", Eleven Eleven Journal, 2015
- "Statistics", Rove, 2015
- "A Man Goes West and Falls Off His Horse in the Desert" and "Self-Portrait as a Door", Tupelo Quarterly, 2013
- "Arkansas Love Poem", The Best of Kore Press, 2013
- "Love Poem: Griffon", West Branch, 2013
- "Last Rites", RHINO, 2013
- "Tender" and "What Gay Porn Has Done for Me", Bloom, 2012
- "Love Poem: Minotaur" and "Sonnet in Which Only One Bird Appears", Vinyl, 2012
- "The Yard", "Love Song", "Whale", "Arkansas Love Song", and "Where She Is Opened. Where She Is Closed", The Feminist Wire, 2011
- "Archaeology" and "Perhaps You Tire of Birds", Crazyhorse, 2011
- "Whale", Hayden's Ferry Review, 2011

=== Theses ===
- Framing the Subject in Natasha Trethewey's Bellocq's Ophelia (MA). Vanderbilt University. 2009.
- Reading Against Genre: Contemporary Westerns and the Problem of White Manhood (PhD). Vanderbilt University. 2013.

———————

== Sources ==
- Kelly, Donika (2013). Reading against Genre: Contemporary Westerns and the Problem of White Manhood
- Kelly, Donika (2009), Framing the Subject in Natasha Trethewey's Bellocq's Ophelia
