= Care Work =

2018 book by Leah Lakshmi Piepzna-Samarasinha

- Author: Leah Lakshmi Piepzna-Samarasinha
- Publisher: Arsenal Pulp Press
- Publication date: 2018
- ISBN: 978-1-55152-738-3

Care Work: Dreaming Disability Justice is a 2018 non-fiction essay collection by Canadian-American author and activist Leah Lakshmi Piepzna-Samarasinha.

Vice included Care Work on their list of the top 10 books of 2018. The following year, it was a finalist for the Judy Grahn Award for Lesbian Nonfiction.

== Contents ==
=== Preface ===
- Preface: Writing (with) a Movement from Bed

=== Part 1 ===
1. Care Webs: Experiments in Creating Collective Access
2. Crip Emotional Intelligence
3. Making Space Accessible is an Act of Love for Our Communities
4. Toronto Crip City: A Not-So-Brief, Incomplete Personal History of Some Moments in Time, 1997-2015
5. Sick and Crazy Healer: A Not-So-Brief Personal History of Healing Justice Movement
6. Crip Sex Moments and the Lust of Recognition: A Conversation with E. T. Russian

=== Part 2 ===
7. Cripping the Apocolypse: Some of My Wild Disability Justice Dreams/li>
8. A Modest Proposal for a Fair Trade Emotional Labor Economy (Centered by Disabled, Femme of Color, Working-Class/Poor Genius)
9. Prefigurative Politics and Radically Accessible Performance Spaces: Making the World to Come
10. Chronically Ill Touring Artist Pro Tips

=== Part 3 ===
11. Fuck the "Triumph of the Human Spirit": On Writing Dirty Water as a Queer, Disabled, and Femme-of-Color Memoir, and the Joys of Saying Fuck You to Traditional Abuse Survivor Narratives
12. Suicidal Ideation 2.0: Queer Community Leadership and Staring Alive Anyway
13. So Much Time Spent in Bed: A Letter to Gloria Anzaldúa on Chronic Illness, Coatlicue, and Creativity
14. Prince, Chronic Pain, and Living to Get Old
15. Two or Three Things I know for Sure about Femmes and Suicide: A Love Letter

=== Part 4 ===
16. For Badass Disability Justice, Working-Class and Poor-Led Models of Sustainable Hustling for Liberation
17. Protect Your Heart: Femme Leadership and Hyper-Accountability
18. Not Over It, Not Fixed, and Living a Life Worth Living: Towards and Anti-Ableist Vision of Survivorhood
19. Crip Lineages, Crip Futures: A Conversation with Stacey Milbern
