= Sky Cubacub =

American fashion designer

Sky Cubacub (born 1991) is an American designer, activist, and founder of Rebirth Garments. They were born in Chicago, Illinois and identify as a non-binary Filipinx disabled queer. Cubacub graduated from the School of the Art Institute of Chicago in 2015, and earned a Bachelor of Fine Arts. Their fashion brand Rebirth Garments was launched in 2014. They also teamed up with the Chicago Public Library in October 2020 to create a fashion program called Radical Fit for the Chicago Public Library. Cubacub has held several performances, exhibitions, and lectures from Chicago, to New York City, and Ottawa. They've won several awards including the most recent Ford Foundation, United States Artist and Andrew W Mellon foundation Disability Futures Fellow in 2021.

== Early life ==
Sky Cubacub grew up in Chicago, Illinois in a Filipinx American family. From an early age, they dealt with anxiety, panic disorders, depression, and disabilities such as C-PTSD, polyendocrine metabolic ovarian syndrome (PMOS), environmental illnesses as well as an undiagnosed stomach disorder. As a non-binary queer person, they sought out gender affirming garments but because of their health, a need for garments that were accessible for individuals with disabilities was also present. After attempting to purchase a chest binder while under the age of 18, they realized these types of garments were limited or not accessible for everyone. Also, after previously making a garment for a cousin, another family member encouraged Cubacub to make a fashion brand for kids with disabilities. With this suggestion, Cubacub realized they wanted to make inclusive clothing not just for kids but for everyone with queer and disabled identities. Their own clothing needs lead to the idea of creating garments and accessories that were gender non-conforming, in any size range and met the needs of individuals with apparent and non-apparent disabilities and disorders.

== Education ==
Sky Cubacub attended the School of the Art Institute of Chicago from 2010 to 2014, studied fibers, textiles and weaving arts. They obtained a Bachelor's in Fine Arts (BFA). In 2018, they did a residency at the Evanston Art Center and introduced the Radical Visibility Collective along with collaborators, Jake Vogds and Compton Q.

== Career ==
In the summer of 2014, Sky Cubacub created a clothing line titled Rebirth Garments. It provides personal handmade attire and accessories for people of different sizes, genders, and disabilities. Cubacub conducts interviews with customers and models, asking them questions about their preferred colors, patterns, accessibility, body, and overall visual expression of the garment. Rebirth Garments specializes in lingerie, swimwear and dancewear. These garments are typically created in assorted bright colors. One material commonly chosen for its elastic properties is Spandex. Cubacub has chosen to debut their garments with a dance performance in lieu of a runway fashion show. The collection was composed of 25 looks and incorporated music that was custom made for the performance. During the COVID-19 pandemic, Cubacub incorporated facial masks to their collection. As of recently, Cubacub and the Rebirth Garments team offer virtual workshops and lectures. They have a variety of these workshops and lectures that are based on different topics, including no-sew fashion, performance, symbol-making, pattern-making, entrepreneurship, zines, and the Radical Visibility manifesto.

In the fall of 2020, the Chicago Public Library announced a program offered in partnership with Cubacub called Radical Fit, which ran through October 2020 to August 2021. The program offered online fashion tutorials events in-person and online where interested teens were introduced to a variety of fashion and craft projects, sometimes with the help of other amateur and expert designers. Cubacub is also the editor of Radical Visibility Zine, a magazine promoting a safe space for those "who have often been excluded from mainstream fashion.

== Awards and recognitions ==
In 2018, Sky Cubacub was named Chicagoan of the Year by the Chicago Tribune. They also are a 2019/2020 Kennedy Center Citizen Artist and a Disability Features Fellow.
