= Nicole Newnham =

Documentary film producer, writer, and director

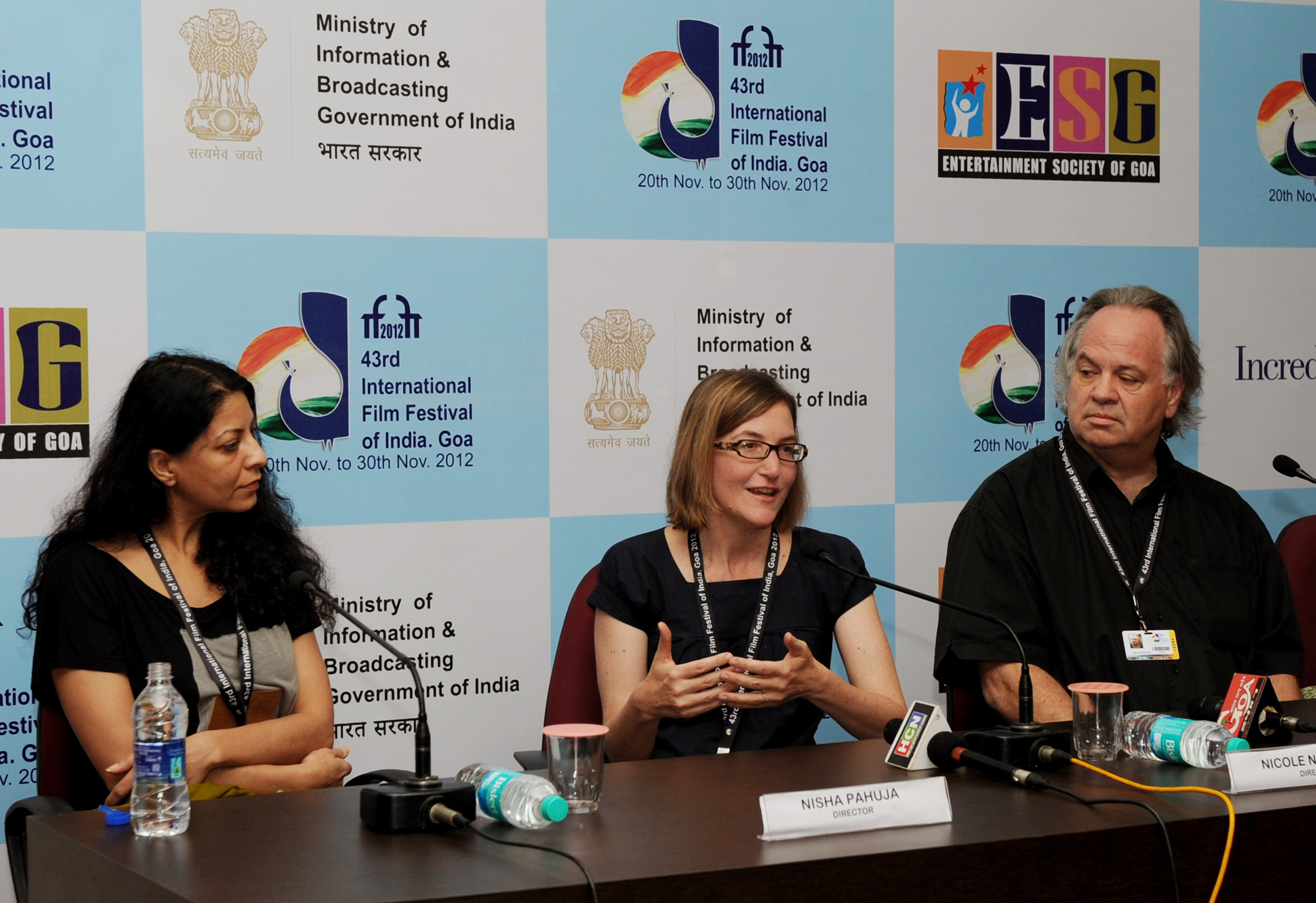
- Nicole Newnham (center)
- Born: New York, New York
- Education: Stanford
- Years active: 1994-present
- Notable work: Crip Camp; The Rape of Europa
- Awards: Emmy; 2017; Emmy; 2020

Nicole Newnham is an American documentary film producer, writer, and director known for the Oscar-nominated movie Crip Camp (2020) which she co-directed and produced with James LeBrecht, and the multiple-Emmy-nominated film The Rape of Europa. With the Australian artist/director Lynette Wallworth, she produced the virtual reality work Collisions, which won the 2017 Emmy for Outstanding New Approaches to Documentary, and Awavena, which won the 2020 Emmy for Outstanding New Approaches to Documentary. Both Collisions and Awavena premiered simultaneously at Sundance and the World Economic Forum in Davos, and Awavena was selected for the 2018 Venice Biennale. Her most recent film, The Disappearance of Shere Hite, premiered at the 2023 Sundance Film Festival. That film also made the influential 2023 DOC NYC Awards Short List and won Special Mention for Editing, edited by Eileen Meyer. In 2025, The Disappearance of Shere Hite was nominated for the Cinema for Peace Dove for Women's Empowerment.

Newnham's 2013 film The Revolutionary Optimists was nominated for an Emmy and won the Sundance Hilton Sustainability Award. That film also spawned the data-mapping website Map Your World which is an open source data/mapping/storytelling platform. In 2006 she co-directed the Independent Lens / PBS documentary Sentenced Home, also nominated for an Emmy, about three Cambodian-American men - raised in the United States - who found themselves eligible to be deported to Cambodia after 9/11.

With Pulitzer Prize-winning photographer Brian Lanker, she produced They Drew Fire, about the Combat Artists of WWII, and co-wrote the companion book, distributed by HarperCollins. Her first documentary, Unforgettable Face, screened at the Sundance Film Festival in 1994.

== Personal life ==
Newnham earned an M.A. from the Stanford Documentary Film Program in 1994. She lives in Oakland, CA with her husband Tom Malarkey, and their two sons.
