= Leah Lakshmi Piepzna-Samarasinha =

Canadian-American writer

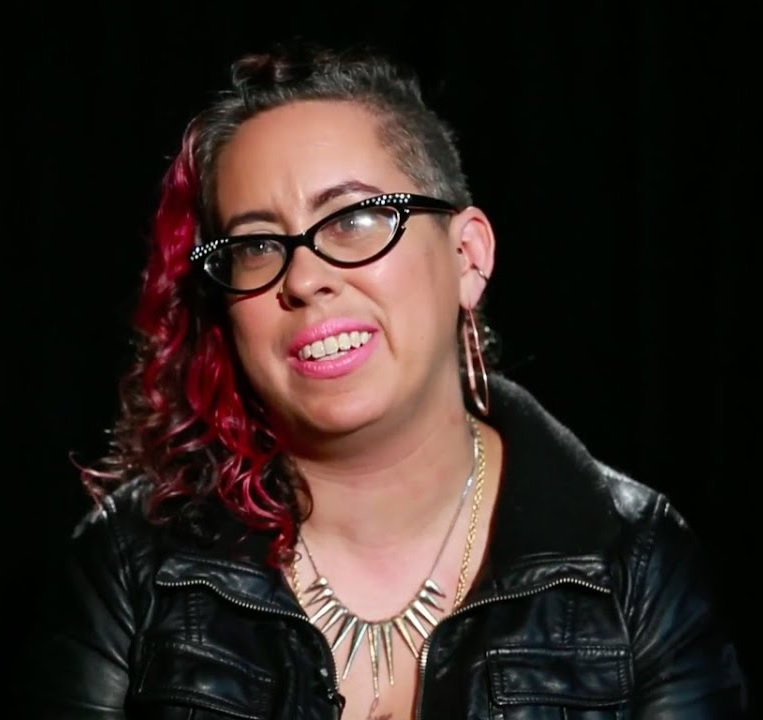
- Piepzna-Samarasinha on The Laura Flanders Show in 2015
- Born: Leah Albrecht; April 21, 1975 (age 51)
- Citizenship: Canadian-American
- Education: Eugene Lang College of Liberal Arts (1997); Mills College (MFA)
- Occupations: Poet, writer, educator and social activist
- Awards: Lambda Literary Award for Lesbian Poetry (2012); Jeanne Córdova Prize (2020)

Leah Lakshmi Piepzna-Samarasinha (born April 21, 1975) is a Canadian-American poet, writer, educator, and social activist. Their writing and performance art focuses on documenting the stories of queer and trans people of color, abuse survivors, mixed-race people and diasporic South Asians and Sri Lankans. A central concern of their work is the interconnection of systems of colonialism, abuse and violence. They are also a writer and organizer within the disability justice movement.

== Early life ==
Piepzna-Samarasinha was raised in Worcester, Massachusetts and is of Burgher/Tamil Sri Lankan and Irish/Roma descent.

Piepzna-Samarasinha graduated from Eugene Lang College The New School for Liberal Arts in New York City in 1997. They received their Master of Fine Arts from Mills College.

== Career ==
=== Performance art ===
Piepzna-Samarasinha has been performing spoken word since 1998.

As a spoken word artist, they have performed widely in the United States, Canada and Sri Lanka and have been featured at Bar 13, Michelle Tea's RADAR Reading Series, The Loft Literary Center, and Buddies in Bad Times Theatre, as well as at universities including Yale University, Sarah Lawrence College, Oberlin College, Swarthmore College and the University of Southern California.

In 2001, frustrated with the racism of the local white-dominated queer and trans poetry scene and the homophobia in the local poetry spaces for people of color, Piepzna-Samarasinha began Browngirlworld, a reading series with the goal of creating a poetry and performance space for queer and trans people of color. Initially held weekly, the event became a biannual, large-scale poetry event in partnership with the Toronto Women's Bookstore, bringing artists such as Mango Tribe and D'Lo.

The following year, Piepzna-Samarasinha traveled to the San Francisco Bay Area to study poetry with Suheir Hammad at Voices of Our Nations.

In 2006, Piepzna-Samarasinha wrote and premiered their first one-person show, Grown Woman Show, in which they discuss being "a queer girl of Sri Lankan descent" who is a survivor of incest perpetrated by their mother. Grown Woman Show has since been performed at the National Queer Arts Festival, Swarthmore College, Yale University, Reed College, and McGill University.

Later that year, Piepzna-Samarasinha met Ctheirry Galette on Friendster and created Mangos With Chili with the goal of creating an annual tour of performance artists who are queer and trans people of color.

Piepzna-Samarasinha is also involved with the biannual Asian Pacific Islander Spoken Word and Poetry Summit.

They were the 2009–2010 artist-in-residence at University of California Berkeley's June Jordan's Poetry for the People. From 2009 to the present, they have been a commissioned performer with Sins Invalid, the national performance organization of queer people with disabilities and chronic illnesses.

While in Toronto, with Syrus Marcus Ware, they co-created Performance.Disability.Art (PDA), a performance-based disability arts collective. Through PDA, the pair co-curated Crip Your World: an Intergalactic Mad, Sick and Disabled Extravaganza for Mayworks Festival.

=== Teaching ===
In 2001, Piepzna-Samarasinha taught writing to 2SLGBTQ+ youth at Supporting Our Youth Toronto (SOY) through the Pink Ink program. This included working with the zine 10 Reasons to Riot which won Best Zine in Toronto in 2006. For this work they were awarded the Community Service to Youth Award from the City of Toronto in 2004.

In the early 2000s, along with Gein Wong, they co-founded the Asian Arts Freedom School, inspired by radical Asian and Pacific Islander American (APIA) arts and poetry youth education programs at the APIA Spoken Word Summit. They were also involved with the Canadian Sri Lankan Women's Action Network, an activist group seeking to promote peace with justice through a feminist lens to end Sri Lankan civil war.

=== Writing ===
Piepzna-Samarasinha has published nine books independently, been included in ten anthologies, and edited two anthologies. Their work has also appeared in Yes!, Vice, Room, Xtra, Herizons and other publications.

=== Healing ===
Piepzna-Samarasinha is a member of Bad Ass Visionary Healers, a California-based activist healing collective, and has an "intuitive counseling" practice, Brownstargirl Tarot. They have been involved in organizing healing justice practice spaces at the Allied Media Conference, Safetyfest and other spaces.

== Personal life ==
Piepzna-Samarasinha has lived in Brooklyn, Oakland and Toronto and currently resides in South Seattle, Duwamish territories.

Piepzna-Samarasinha is non-binary, queer and disabled. They have described themself as "an autistic femme."

== Awards and honors ==
=== Self ===
Piepzna-Samarasinha was a Voices of Our Nation and US Artists Disability Futures fellow (2020).

Awards for Piepzna-Samarasinha
Year	Award / Honor	Ref.
2004	City of Toronto's Community Service Volunteer Award	
2009	Bent Institute Mentor of the Bent Writing Institute of Seattle	
2020	Jeanne Córdova Prize for Lesbian/Queer Nonfiction	

=== Written works ===
Awards and honors for Piepzna-Samarasinha's works
Year	Work	Award	Result	Ref.
2012	Love Cake	Lambda Literary Award for Lesbian Poetry	Winner	
2016	Bodymap	Audre Lorde Award for Lesbian Poetry	Finalist	
2016	Dirty River	Judy Grahn Award for Lesbian Nonfiction	Finalist	
2016	Dirty River	Lambda Literary Award for Lesbian Memoir or Biography	Finalist	
2016	Dirty River	Over the Rainbow Project Book List	Top 10	
2019	Care Work	Judy Grahn Award for Lesbian Nonfiction	Finalist	
2020	Tonguebreaker	Audre Lorde Award for Lesbian Poetry	Finalist	
2021	Beyond Survival	Lambda Literary Award for Anthology	Finalist	

== Publications ==
=== Edited anthologies ===
- Chen, Ching-In; Dulani, Jai; Piepzna-Samarasinha, Leah Lakshmi, eds. (2011). The Revolution Starts at Home: Confronting Intimate Violence Within Activist Communities. Brooklyn NY: South End Press. ISBN 978-0-89608-794-1.
- Dixon, Ejeris; Piepzna-Samarasinha, Leah Lakshmi, eds. (2020). Beyond Survival: Strategies and Stories from the Transformative Justice Movement. Chico, CA Edinburgh, Scotland: AK Press. ISBN 978-1-84935-362-5.

=== Children's books ===
- Piepzna-Samarasinha, Leah Lakshimi (2019). Bridge of Flowers. Illus. by Syrus Marcus Ware. Flamingo Rampant. ISBN 978-1-775-08409-9.

=== Non-fiction ===
- Brown Femme Survivor. Mawenzi House. 2013. ISBN 978-1-927-49429-5.
- Dirty River: A Queer Femme of Color Dreaming Her Way Home. New York, NY: Arsenal Pulp Press. 2016. ISBN 978-1-55152-600-3.
- Care Work: Dreaming Disability Justice. Vancouver: Arsenal Pulp Press. 2018. ISBN 978-1-55152-738-3.
- The Future is Disabled: Prophecies, Love Notes and Mourning Songs. Vancouver: Arsenal Pulp Press. 2022. ISBN 978-1-55152-891-5.

=== Poetry ===
- Consensual Genocide. Toronto: TSAR Publications. 2006. ISBN 978-1-894770-29-3.
- Love Cake: Poems. Mawenzi House. 2011. ISBN 978-1-894770-69-9.
- Bodymap: Poems. Toronto, Ontario: Mawenzi House. 2015. ISBN 978-1-927494-50-9.
- Tonguebreaker: Poems. Arsenal Pulp Press. 2019. ISBN 978-1-551-52757-4.
- The Way Disabled People Love Each Other. Arsenal Pulp Press. 2026. ISBN 9781834050300.
