= Sins Invalid =

Disability justice-based performance project

Sins Invalid is a disability justice-based performance project that focuses on artists with disabilities, artists of color, and LGBTQ / gender-variant artists. Led by disabled people of color, Sins Invalid's performance work explores the themes of sexuality, embodiment and the disabled body. In addition to multidisciplinary performances by people with disabilities, Sins Invalid organizes visual art exhibitions, readings, and a bi-monthly educational video series. Sins Invalid collaborates with other movement-building projects and provides disability justice training.

== Founding and Organizational History ==
Sins Invalid was founded in 2005 by Patricia Berne and Leroy F. Moore Jr. The organization, which Berne has described as "a hybrid between a community-based organization and a performance" originated in the San Francisco Bay Area and tours nationally. Berne and Moore, who are old friends, have both had disabilities since birth. They started the project upon realizing the scarcity of venues dedicated to celebration of their work and their bodies. Berne serves as Director of the organization and has been involved in work surrounding asylum claims, youth incarceration alternatives, the LGBTQIA community, and mental health support for survivors of violence, among other fields. Moore is Sins Invalid's Community Relations Director. His work extends to writing, poetry, lecture series, and hip-hop/music. He has worked, studied, and lectured internationally and is considered a "leading voice" regarding police brutality toward and wrongful incarceration of people with disabilities.

According to a Huffington Post interview conducted by Cory Silverburg with Berne and Moore, Sins Invalid's (pronounced as in "not valid") name came from the idea that a disabled child is a manifestation of "the sins of the father being cast upon the son". As Berne articulates, there is a pervasive societal norm that validates bodies according to beauty, hygienic, health, and other sets of standards. These sets of standards had led to people needing to behave in societally acceptable ways. Such "markers" are used to determine if someone had a disability, linking "cultural devaluation of disability and other undesirable characteristics." However, in opposition to the societal norm, Sins Invalid's framework asserts that humans have a wide variety of embodiments, and all bodies are valid and worthy of celebration. It is also a play on words, since people with disabilities have historically been referred to as "invalids".

Since its creation, Sins Invalid has held annual major theater performances and an artist-in-residence performance, which have all received critical acclaim. In 2012, the project launched a Kickstarter campaign, culminating in the 2013 release of a 32-minute documentary titled Sins Invalid: An Unshamed Claim to Beauty in the Face of Invisibility, directed by Berne, which details its disability justice efforts and the value of artistic expression. The documentary also elucidates the need for the inclusion of sex and sexuality in disability rights discourse.

=== Vision ===
Present in an ableist society, people with disability are perceived of a fate that is "worse than death" and prevents them from living a "full life." Sins Invalid works through an ableist society by allowing people with disabilities, through their performance, to showcase that they themselves are able to live their lives fully without any "isolation and pathos." A review by Terry Rowden states, "Moving decisively beyond any simple 'shock' or 'transgressive' aesthetic…challenges the politics that systematically disables our ability to recognize beauty." In support of disabled people's ability to fulfill their lives and as a liberating movement, Sins Invalid presents performances that challenge "normal" and "sexy," providing provocative work for their audience. Berne has described the project as, "an erotic event featuring people with disabilities". Sins Invalid harnesses the power of the erotic, using it as a force in politicizing the disabled body. According to Audre Lorde, the erotic is a means to assert power for people who have historically been denied agency. She writes, "The erotic is a measure between our sense of self and the chaos of our strongest feelings." Sins Invalid's invocation of the erotic is a means to empower those who have been denied a space for expression in the public sphere.

Alison Kafer states an intersectionality between homosexuality and disability. She mentions that in the literature of reproductive technologies contains its "'proper' use" that supports the idea of heterocentrism and homophobia, further intersecting with ableism and stereotypes of disability as well. Sins Invalid addresses this intersectionality by its goal to move from individual legal rights toward a collective human rights framework through their performances. Berne's writing speaks to both types of change. She uses herself as an example, discussing the fact that her wheelchair does not climb stairs and asking the reader if this is a problem with the wheelchair or a problem with the stairs. Berne encourages her audience to think critically about our surroundings and the barriers that exist for various members of society due to identity. Berne and Moore both view the oppression of the non-normative body as something to move beyond, toward opportunities for liberation and beauty and a new vision of embodiment.

== Disability Justice ==
Disability Justice serves as a central motive for Sins Invalid, as the term can mean a group's liberation and justice being linked together and can only be achieved if people "stand together and fight for the rights and liberties of the next individual or community." Acknowledging the full history of disability in the United States requires a deconstruction of the dehumanizing practices that have plagued the community. All types of experiences are included in the show, and the denial of sexuality is part of that dehumanization. And in resistance to that dehumanization, Berne expresses that by the movement of Sins invalid, experiencing sexuality as a crip is an example of resisting dehumanization. Berne's outtake on disability justice, creating a non-normative space for people with disabilities, proves what disability justice conveys: being free is not just "casting off one's chains," but as Alice Wong states, disability justice provides an opportunity for people with disabilities to "live in a way that respects and enhances the freedom of others."

Sins Invalid's celebration of the multiplicity and diversity of identities is an iteration of intersectionality in practice. The human body is not permanent and unchanging; rather, it is a non-static being that can change based on nature, the environment, or perception. Since disability does not discriminate, it is useful as a category of analysis in terms of its potential to create, as disability studies scholar Simi Linton puts it, "a prism through which one can gain a broader understanding of society and human experience". Since Sins Invalid includes performers with disabilities who are also people of color, queer, etc., intersectionality is woven into its performances and guiding ideology. This only proves anyone can be a part of disability justice, all organized from "their own spoons, own bodies and minds, and own communities." In the documentary, Sins Invalid member Leah Lakshmi Piepzna-Samarasinha comments on the freedom that the space provides for various manifestations of difference, such as queerness. They say, "No one has to closet themselves," and this applies to any identity. This ties into Berne's idea of being able to "orient the gaze," or the position the audience occupies as consumers of the performance. Since the project is conscious of so many diverse lenses and does not limit the frame to disability, performers and audience members alike have the opportunity to feel empowered by the acknowledgement of identities.

In order to understand the idea of embodiment, of occupying the body, Berne states, one must have an understanding of the body as situated within a historical, political, cultural, and social context. The intersectionality enters again, as disability justice is being added to social justice, not because it's another factor of diversity and representation, but also because disability justice can transform what society perceive of the "quality of life, purpose, work, relationships, belonging" for people with disabilities. Feminist disability studies scholar Rosemarie Garland-Thomson argues that, "integrating disability as a category of analysis and a system of representation deepens, expands, and challenges feminist theory". For Garland-Thomson, the "shared human experience of embodiment" provides a framework in which all individuals should be able to understand the way systems affect or do not affect them based on their bodies.

Beyond the ways in which Sins Invalid embodies how their performances serve as a fight for disability justice, the term also portrays the importance of access for this marginalized community. For people supporting the disability movement, they know that "access is just the first step on the way to a liberated disabled future." And in a way, Sins Invalid has given their very own access in expressing their fight for liberation in a non-normative space through their performances. The continuing fight for representation also proves that disability is a "widely shared experience," intersecting with many factors of modern life. And by considering disability as an experience present in everywhere we go, Sins Invaid only conveys that the non-normative also possibly leads to what is also considered the societal norm.
