= Ching-In Chen =

Chinese-American poet and writer

Ching-In Chen is a genderqueer Chinese American writer.

They graduated from Tufts University, the University of California Riverside, and the University of Wisconsin–Milwaukee.

They are the author of recombinant, The Heart's Traffic, and to make black paper sing. Chen is also the co-editor of the anthologies The Revolution Starts at Home: Confronting Intimate Violence Within Activist Communities and Here Is a Pen: An Anthology of West Coast Kundiman Poets. They have been a Callaloo, Kundiman, and Lambda Fellow.

Chen has taught in Sam Houston State University's English department and currently teaches in the School of Interdisciplinary Arts & Sciences at the University of Washington Bothell. They served as the staff advisor for Clamor, Bothell's literary magazine, alongside Amaranth Borsuk.

== Career ==
Chen's first book, The Heart's Traffic (2009), is a "novel-in-poems" that employs multiple poetic forms, including the sestina, villanelle, haibun, and pantoum. The book focuses on the experiences of Xiaomei, a young immigrant from China to the United States.

Chen's second book, recombinant (2017), received the 2018 Lambda Literary Award for Transgender Poetry.

In 2024, Chen was selected as poet laureate of the city of Redmond, Washington.

== Works ==
=== Author ===
- to make black paper sing (speCt! books, 2019).
- recombinant (Kelsey Street Press, 2017). ISBN 9780932716866, OCLC 1035945370
- The Heart's Traffic (Arktoi/Red Ren Press, 2009). ISBN 9780980040722, OCLC 641749078

=== Co-editor ===
- The Revolution Starts at Home: Confronting Intimate Violence Within Activist Communities (South End Press, 2011). ISBN 978-0-89608-794-1, OCLC 601132720
- Here Is a Pen: An Anthology of West Coast Kundiman Poets (Achiote Press, 2009). OCLC 775595869
