= Disabled in Action =

American civil rights organization

The official logo of Disabled In Action (DIA)

Disabled In Action of Metropolitan New York (DIA) is a civil rights organization, based in New York City, committed to ending discrimination against people with disabilities through litigation and demonstrations. It was founded in 1970 by Judith E. Heumann and her friends Denise McQuade, Bobbi Linn, Frieda Tankus, Fred Francis, Pat Figueroa, possibly Larry Weissberger, Susan Marcus, Jimmy Lynch and Roni Stier (all of whom were disabled). Heumann had met some of the others at Camp Jened, a camp for children with disabilities. Disabled In Action is a democratic, not-for-profit, tax-exempt, membership organization. Disabled In Action consists primarily of and is directed by people with disabilities.

As stated on its website, the organization aims to "fight to eliminate the barriers that prevent [people with disabilities] from enjoying full equality in American society."

DIA believes in the motto, "Nothing about us without us!"

The organization meets monthly in New York City and publishes a newsletter, in print and online, called The DIA ACTIVIST.

Disabled In Action, along with the New York City Commission on Human Rights, is involved with The One Step Campaign, a coalition of disability, advocacy and service organizations. The campaign encourages stores, restaurants and other places of public accommodation in the New York City area to provide wheelchair accessibility.

== History ==
Disabled in Action was founded in 1970 by Judith E. Heumann and her friends Denise McQuade, Bobbi Linn, Frieda Tankus, Fred Francis, Pat Figueroa, possibly Larry Weissberger, Susan Marcus, Jimmy Lynch and Roni Stier (all of whom were disabled). Heumann had met some of the others at Camp Jened, a camp for children with disabilities. According to Heumann, the organization was originally called "Handicapped in Action". She disliked that name and lobbied to change it. Heumann explained, "How could we, as a new organization, be calling ourselves 'Handicapped in Action'?" As a result, the name of the organization was changed to Disabled in Action.

Early versions of the Rehabilitation Act of 1973 were vetoed by President Richard Nixon in October 1972 and March 1973. In 1972, DIA demonstrated in New York City with a sit-in protesting one of the vetoes. Led by Heumann, eighty activists staged this sit-in on Madison Avenue, stopping traffic. In 1972 demonstrations were also held by disabled activists in Washington, D.C. to protest this veto; among the demonstrators were DIA, Paralyzed Veterans of America, the National Paraplegia Foundation, and others.

In 1976, DIA picketed the United Cerebral Palsy telethon, calling telethons "demeaning and paternalistic shows which celebrate and encourage pity."

In the late 1970s, some Disabled In Action members formed a musical group called The DIA Singers, which recorded two albums, In Motion and ...and the Parking Spots Are Nothing But The Best.

On April 19, 2006, it was announced that after nearly 5 years, Duane Reade, a chain of drugstores primarily located in New York City, finally agreed to settle with Disabled In Action to make all of its stores ADA-compliant. According to the New York Daily News, Duane Reade estimated it would take two years to inspect and revamp its stores for wheelchair access.

NBC's original The More You Know logo is very similar to the DIA's logo. The DIA had considered legal action against NBC for copyright infringement, but has subsided those claims since the logo was changed.
