= Disability justice =

Social justice movement

Disability justice is a social justice movement which focuses on examining disability and ableism as they relate to other forms of oppression and identity such as race, class and gender.

== Background ==
It was developed in 2005 by the Disability Justice Collective, a group including Patty Berne, Mia Mingus, Stacey Milbern, Leroy F. Moore Jr., and Eli Clare. In disability justice, disability is not considered to be defined in "white terms, or male terms, or straight terms." The movement also believes that ableism makes other forms of prejudice possible and that systems of oppression are intertwined. The disability justice framework is being applied to an intersectional reexamination of a wide range of disability, human rights, and justice movements.

== Origins ==
Initially conceived by queer, disabled women of color, Patty Berne, Mia Mingus, and Stacey Milbern, in the San Francisco Bay Area, disability justice was built in reaction to their exclusion from mainstream disability rights movement and disability studies discourse and activism, as well as the ableism in activist spaces. They were later joined by Leroy Moore, Eli Clare, and Sebastian Margaret. Disability justice centers "disabled people of color, immigrants with disabilities, queers with disabilities, trans and gender non-conforming people with disabilities, people with disabilities who are houseless, people with disabilities who are incarcerated, people with disabilities who have had their ancestral lands stolen, amongst others."

As mentioned before, disability justice movements discuss the various systems of oppression even within the disability community. One specific example for the Asian American community would be how oftentimes, members are unable and refuse to get help for mental health because it is seen as "taboo" in their culture. Since mental health is an "untouchable" topic in Asian culture, members who struggle with it hide it due to shame and embarrassment, and therefore are not able to share their experiences with their community and society in general. This reflects how the identities of being an Asian American and also possessing a mental disability cause these members to have a "lesser" voice in society. The disability justice movement seeks to spread awareness on how ableism is much more complex than people struggling with a disability [ies].

Sins Invalid, the group through which the founders were connected, defines disability justice through ten key principles: intersectionality, leadership by those most affected, anti-capitalism, solidarity across different activist causes and movements, recognizing people as whole people, sustainability, solidarity across different disabilities, interdependence, collective access, and collective liberation.

The disability justice work of the Bay Area activists has informed the development of the Disability Justice Initiative in Washington, D.C. On July 26, 2018, the 28th anniversary of the Americans With Disabilities Act (ADA), the Center for American Progress (CAP) formally announced its Disability Justice Initiative, under the direction of Rebecca Cokley. CAP is the first public policy think tank to specifically focus on disability. Recognition of the need for an intentional and intersectional approach was driven in part by attempts to cut the Affordable Care Act.

In April 2019, Performance Space New York hosted a three-day festival developed around the disability justice framework. Performance Space New York worked with the political arts group Arika, the Whitney Museum of American Art and others to bring together disabled artists and writers. Entitled I wanna be with you everywhere (IWBWYE), the festival attempted to create an experience of "access intimacy", in which needs were "respected, anticipated, and lovingly welcomed".

== Principles ==
Sins Invalid has detailed the following 10 principles of disability justice:

- Intersectionality: Proponents of disability justice recognize that individuals have various identities (e.g., race, gender, sexuality, religious background, location, immigration status) that impact them in varying ways. As such, individuals experience privilege based on some of their identities and oppression based on other identities.
- Leadership of those most impacted: Proponents of disability justice believe that people impacted by a specific form of oppression should be considered experts in that form of oppression; as such, proponents are interested in "lifting up, listening to, reading, following, and highlighting the perspectives of those who are most impacted by the systems we fght [sic] against".
- Anti-capitalist politics: Proponents of disability justice argue that "capitalism depends on wealth accumulation for some [...] at the expense of others, and encourages competition as a means of survival", which harms people from oppressed groups.
- Cross-movement solidarity: Proponents of disability justice argue that disability justice activists must work alongside activists for other social justice movements to "create a united front".
- Recognizing wholeness: Proponents of disability justice believe that "each person is full of history and life experience. Each person has an internal experience composed of our own thoughts, sensations, emotions, sexual fantasies, perceptions, and quirks. Disabled people are whole people."
- Sustainability: Proponents of disability justice argue that activists must "pace [them]selves, individually and collectively, to be sustained long-term", using experience as a guide "away from urgency and into a deep, slow, transformative, unstoppable wave of justice and liberation".
- Commitment to cross-disability solidarity: Proponents of disability justice argue that every disabled person's experiences and perspectives should be valued. Further, they aim to include people with varied disabilities, including "people with physical impairments, people who are sick or chronically ill, psych survivors and people with mental health disabilities, neurodivergent people, people with intellectual or developmental disabilities, Deaf people, Blind people, people with environmental injuries and chemical sensitivities, and all others who experience ableism and isolation that undermines our collective liberation".
- Interdependence: Proponents of disability justice argue that before European colonization, individuals in communities critically depended upon one another, and disability justice aims to reestablish such systems of interdependence, including recognizing humanities dependence upon the land and more-than-human life.
- Collective access: Proponents of disability justice believe all people should have equal access in society, which means being flexible and creative about the ways in which people interact with one another, the built environment, and more. This involves both advocating for the needs of individuals and the collective to receive access, as well as for systemic changes to address widespread access concerns.
- Collective liberation: Proponents of disability justice believe all oppressed people should move together toward liberation.

== Critiques of Disability Rights ==
Like earlier critiques of reproductive rights by reproductive justice activists and critiques of environmentalism by environmental justice activists, the founders of the disability justice movement thought the disability rights movement and disability studies overly focused on straight white men with physical disabilities to the exclusion of others.

Many in the disability justice movement were also critical of an emphasis on rights without a broader examination of systems of oppression (for example, the right to an education does not mean that all education is equitable).

Writer and activist Audre Lorde is frequently referenced as inspirational to the disability justice movement, for works such as her essay "A Burst of Light: Living with Cancer", which addresses disability, illness, and racial justice, emphasizing that "We do not live single issue lives". Writers such as Catherine Jampel have emphasized the importance of disability justice to an intersectional reexamination of environmental justice. Writers such as Jina B. Kim draw upon disability justice and "crip-of-color" critiques in an attempt to develop an intersectional critical disability methodology which emphasizes that all lives are "enriched, enabled, and made possible" through a variety of means of support.

== Healthcare and Disability Justice ==
=== Medical Ableism ===
Medical ableism refers to the systemic and interpersonal biases within healthcare systems that result in the marginalization, misdiagnosis, or inadequate care of disabled people. From a disability justice perspective, medical ableism is not simply the result of ignorance or outdated practices but is rooted in structural inequities that devalue disabled lives, particularly those of people who are also marginalized by race, gender, class, or sexuality.

Disability justice advocates emphasize that traditional medical models often frame disability as a problem to be cured or eliminated, rather than a valued identity or variation of human experience. This perspective can lead to what scholars and activists describe as diagnostic overshadowing, where healthcare providers overlook or dismiss health concerns because of a patient's disability status. It also manifests in inaccessible medical equipment, exclusionary research practices, and assumptions about quality of life that influence decisions about treatment, reproduction, and end-of-life care.

Disability justice critiques medical gatekeeping and instead calls for healthcare systems that prioritize interdependence, informed consent, and community knowledge. The framework challenges deeply ingrained beliefs about normalcy and productivity that underlie medical discrimination, particularly for multiply-marginalized disabled people—including Black, Indigenous, and people of color, LGBTQ+ individuals, and those with intellectual or psychosocial disabilities.

This critique extends to public health, where policies and crisis responses have often deprioritized disabled people, as seen during the COVID-19 pandemic. Disability justice organizers highlighted triage protocols that explicitly or implicitly deemed disabled lives less worthy of medical resources, drawing connections between ableism, eugenics, and structural racism.
