= POOR Magazine =

Non-profit arts organisation in California

POOR Magazine/Prensa Pobre is a grassroots, poor people-led, non-profit arts organization in San Francisco, California, United States. It is part of the greater indigenous and poor peoples-led movements around the world, such as the Landless Peoples Movements, the Homeless Workers' Movement, and Take Back the Land. POOR Magazine also holds an office in Oakland, California through its Homefulness Project, a sustainable permanent housing initiative for families displaced by gentrification.

POOR Magazine was founded in 1996 by Lisa "Tiny" Gray-Garcia and Dee Gray, a mother and daughter team struggling with extreme poverty, racism, incarceration, and homelessness.

In November 2013 POOR Magazine staged a highly publicized action theater piece in front of Twitter headquarters to protest Twitter's greater financial presence within San Francisco.

POOR Magazine operates the low-power FM radio station KEXU-LP.
