= Mia Mingus =

Korean American writer and activist

- Occupations: Writer, community organizer, teacher
- Website: leavingevidence.wordpress.com

Mia Mingus is an American writer, educator, and community organizer who focuses on issues of disability justice. She is known for coining the term "access intimacy". She advocates for disability studies and activism to centralize the experiences of marginalized people within disability organizing. She is a prison abolitionist, and she advocates for transformative justice in her work against child sexual abuse.

== Personal life ==
Mingus self-describes as a "physically disabled, queer Korean transracial and transnational adoptee" and a survivor of child sexual abuse. All of these identities are integral to her work as an activist.

=== Childhood ===
Mingus was born in Korea and adopted by white parents when she was an infant. She was raised on the island of St. Croix in the U.S. Virgin Islands. She has a younger sister who was also adopted.

When Mingus was a child, her mother and nine other women founded the Women's Coalition of St. Croix, the first organization on the island dedicated to helping victims of domestic violence, rape, and sexual assault. Mingus's childhood experiences with this organization and the feminist community on the island would later inspire her own work as an activist. These experiences also led her to understand that, as she wrote in a 2018 blog post, "violence...was systemic and more than just a couple of 'bad apples.' It was happening in every community."

== Education ==
Mingus attended school in the Virgin Islands until she was 17 years old. She then attended Agnes Scott College, an all-women's school in Decatur, Georgia, where she earned her degree in women's studies. While volunteering at the National Human for Rights Education Center in high school, Mingus was introduced to Loretta Ross, an African American reproductive justice activist. Through similar volunteering, Mingus was able to earn a community service scholarship to go to college.

== Career ==
=== Early career ===
After graduation, Mingus began her career by working at a feminist bookstore in Atlanta, Charis Books & More. Through Charis, Mingus found an activist community, including a group called Queer Girls, which threw house parties specifically for queer women of color. Later, Mingus worked at Georgians for Choice, an organization associated with the National Abortion Reproductive Rights Action League (NARAL). Later, Mingus was accepted to a reproductive justice fellowship in Chicago. She later became the co-director at Georgians for Choice. Mingus also served on the board of SPARK: Reproductive Justice NOW as the co-founder and co-leader.

Mingus was a part of numerous national coalitions such as Causes in Common, which focused on achieving reproductive rights, health, and justice work for the LGBTQ+ community. She was also a part of the Access Project, NILNY, CLPP (Civil Liberties and Public Policy), and more. Mingus built a partnership with the Atlanta Transformative Justice Collaborative [ATJC], between SPARK and CWPE, and also Project South.

=== Current career ===
Mia Mingus's work focuses on disability justice as a means of liberation. Mingus founded the Living Bridges Project, which focuses on listening to people's responses regarding child sexual abuse. The goal of this project is to offer support and resources to survivors. Similarly, Mingus is the cofounder and core member of the Bay Area Transformative Justice Collective (BATJC), which also collects such child sexual abuse stories and further creates transformative justice responses that promote healing and accountability.

Currently, Mingus has a popular blog titled Leaving Evidence, where she focuses on different social justice issues. Her articles have been showcased in numerous magazines and publications. On October 14, 2021, Mingus was awarded the Robert Coles "Call of Service" award by The Phillips Brooks House Association.

Mingus founded and currently leads SOIL: A Transformative Justice Project, an organization established in 2020 that develops community-based approaches to address harm and violence. SOIL supports this work through political education, skills building, partnerships, and resources for communities seeking these approaches.

In February 2025, Mingus published "Pods for Our Current Moment" through SOIL, discussing the concept of "pods" as networks of people who can provide support, care, and accountability. The article talks about the positive effects of building community connections to address isolation, conflict, and harm they do within communities.

Additionally, more recent academic research has also discussed Mingus's work on disability justice, specifically her work on access intimacy. A 2025 article in "Culture, Health & Sexuality" draws on her concept of access intimacy in examining disability justice, queer experiences, and gender-based violence prevention. Another 2025 article in "New Directions for Higher Education" references her work in discussing the intersections of racism, ableism, and disability accommodation in higher education.

=== Known for ===
Mingus' approach to disability justice focuses on dismantling privilege: "We don't want to simply join the ranks of the privileged; we want to dismantle those ranks and the systems that maintain them" (Mingus, 2011, para. 5).

She is especially well known for her work on "collective access". Collective access emphasizes how disability interacts with other aspects of an individual's identities, making disability justice activism necessarily intertwined with anti-racist, feminist, reproductive justice, queer, and prison abolitionist activism. Emphasizing solidarity between movements, collective access focuses on community-supported access and mutual independence instead of individualized specific accommodations.

Mingus believes that ensuring access or participation for disabled people is not considered justice, but rather people must transform their subjective realities at the core of their humanity to ensure community. Mingus preaches the idea that a focus on exclusion causes people to lose focus on inclusion.

A key element of Mingus's work is her embrace of interdependence. She believes that people needed to rid the myth of independence as interdependency is what forms communities. This concept can be further broken down into the term "access intimacy". Access intimacy is a concept that Mingus formulated as she believed that people can understand and be there for each other, which will provide an unexpected amount of comfort. Mingus believed that the disabled community was missing access intimacy.

Through her work with the BATJC, Mingus developed a tool called pod-mapping, which allows individual to identify the individuals and organizations they could rely on for support to heal or take accountability were they to experience or cause harm, violence or abuse. Pod work is rooted in transformative justice principles of harm and accountability, including a community-based approach to intervening in and preventing violence at all levels.

Mingus has also consistently spoken about the medical industrial complex (MIC) and all that its encompasses: its deep-rooted connections to various forms of oppression, and its complicated relationship with marginalized communities.

She specifically focused on how the MIC can connect to ableism. According to Mingus, while the medical industrial complex can play a critical role in aiding people, it can also be incredibly harmful. In her blog, "Leaving Evidence", Mingus described in-depth the major roles that eugenics, charity and ableism, population control, and desirability play within the complex and how it connects to the overall profitability of the MIC.

She constructed a visual that was included on the blog post, listing all of the different ways that the medical industrial complex intersects with other aspects of societal life. She specifically criticizes how people within the complex can constantly perpetuate ableism in everyday life, noting that as a result of ableism within the MIC, many disabled people can feel alienated within the complex, thus making them less likely to want to interact with the medical industrial complex.

Mingus emphasizes the importance of people coming together to dismantle a strong system like the medical industrial complex, stating that there is a need for people to "live out the simple truth that we need each other." She recommends that people learn to contend with the pain and oppression brought by systems such as the MIC so that change can be created.

=== Awards, Recognitions, and Notable Talks ===
- (2008) Creating Change award, National Gay and Lesbian Task Force
- (2010) Forty under 40, The Advocate
- (2011) Femmes of Color Symposium Keynote Address
- (2013) Queer and Asian Conference Keynote Address
- (2013) API women's Champion of Change, President Barack Obama.
- (2013) 100 Women We Love, GO
- (2018) Disability Intersectionality Summit Keynote Address
- (2020) Ford Foundation Disability Futures Fellow
- (2021) Robert Coles "Call of Service" award

== See also ==
- Disability studies
- Medical industrial complex
