= President's Committee for People with Intellectual Disabilities =

Advisory body to the President of the US

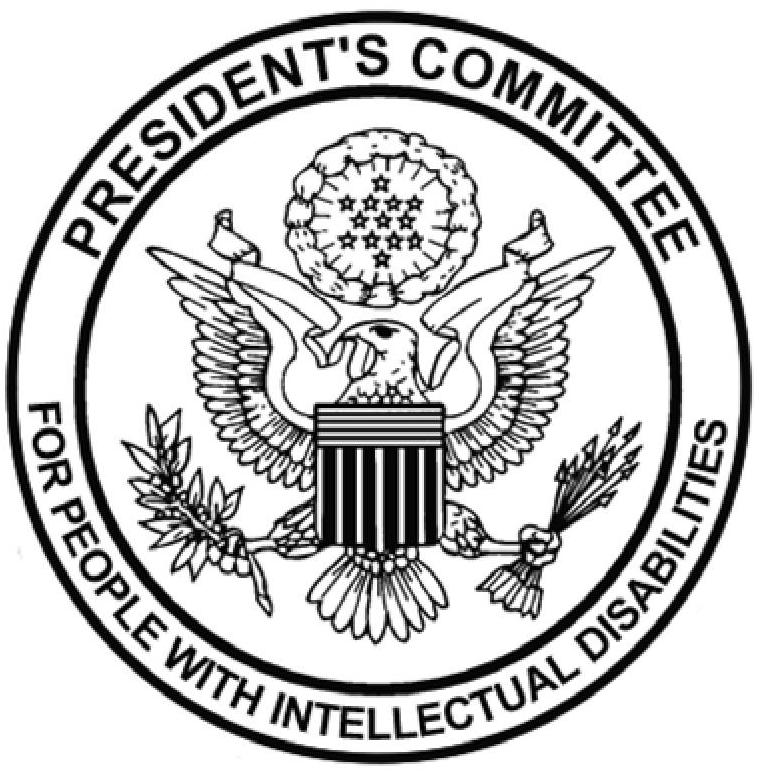
PCPID logo as of 2017

The President's Committee for People with Intellectual Disabilities (PCPID) is an advisory body that provides assistance to the President of the United States and the Secretary of Health and Human Services on public policy issues related to intellectual disability. It was started as a blue-ribbon panel by John F. Kennedy in 1961, and later reorganized through executive order into an official panel by Lyndon B. Johnson in 1966, with the goal of ensuring the right to a "decent, dignified place in society". Originally known as the President's Committee on Mental Retardation, it was eventually renamed in 2003 by George W. Bush over concerns regarding negative labelling. It was established through the work of Eunice Kennedy Shriver while serving as the head of the Joseph P. Kennedy Jr. Foundation.

The PCPID consists of a 31-member panel composed of 18 citizen members and 13 government officials, with the number of citizen members capped at 21, and each citizen serving maximum two-year terms. The citizen members are each appointed by the president, and the government members consist of the following:

- Secretary of Health and Human Services
- Secretary of Education
- Secretary of Labor
- Secretary of Housing and Urban Development
- Secretary of Commerce
- Secretary of Transportation
- Secretary of the Interior
- Secretary of Homeland Security
- Attorney General
- Chief Executive Officer of the Corporation for National and Community Service
- Chair of the Equal Employment Opportunity Commission
- Chair of the National Council on Disability
- Commissioner of the Social Security Administration

The committee receives no federal funding, and administers no grants. The PCPID holds formal meetings twice per year, and issues an annual report providing advice and recommendations. The scope of the PCPID according to its governing executive order is intellectual disability as it relates to:

- Expansion of educational opportunities
- Promotion of homeownership
- Assurance of workplace integration
- Improvement of transportation options
- Expansion of full access to community living
- Increasing access to assistive and universally designed technologies

In 1974 the goals of the committee were realigned by Richard Nixon, with a focus on deinstitutionalization, preventive care, and legal rights, and again in 1996 by Bill Clinton, with a focus on community inclusion.

The committee is located organizationally under the Administration for Community Living and the Department of Health and Human Services.

== See also ==
- Health care in the United States
- History of psychiatric institutions
