= Disability =

Impairments, activity limitations, and participation restrictions

Pictographs used by the United States National Park Service for wheelchair accessibility, low vision access and sign language interpretation.

Disability is the experience of any condition that makes it more difficult for a person to do certain activities or have equitable access within a given society. Disabilities may be cognitive, developmental, intellectual, mental, physical, sensory, or a combination of multiple factors. Disabilities can be present from birth or can be acquired during a person's lifetime. Historically, disabilities have only been recognized based on a narrow set of criteria—however, disabilities are not binary and can present uniquely depending on the individual. A disability may be easily visible, or invisible in nature. The United Nations Convention on the Rights of Persons with Disabilities defines disability as including:

long-term physical, mental, intellectual or sensory impairments which in interaction with various barriers may hinder [a person's] full and effective participation in society on an equal basis with others.

Disabilities have been perceived differently throughout history, through a variety of different theoretical lenses. There are two main models that attempt to explain disability in our society: the medical model and the social model. The medical model serves as a theoretical framework that considers disability as an undesirable medical condition that requires specialized treatment. Those who ascribe to the medical model tend to focus on finding the root causes of disabilities, as well as any cures—such as assistive technology. The social model centers disability as a societally-created limitation on individuals who do not have the same ability as the majority of the population. Those who ascribe to the social model tend to focus on accessibility and social/cultural attitudes toward disability. Although the medical model and social model are the most common frames for disability, there are a multitude of other models that theorize disability.

Like many social categories, the concept of "disability" is under heavy discussion amongst academia, the medical and legal worlds, and the disability community. There are many terms that explain aspects of disability. While some terms solely exist to describe phenomena pertaining to disability, others have been centered around stigmatizing and ostracizing those with disabilities. Some terms have such a negative connotation that they are considered to be slurs. A point of contention is whether it is appropriate to use person-first language (i.e. a person who is disabled) or identity-first language (i.e. a disabled person) when referring to disability and an individual.

Due to the marginalization of disabled people, there have been several activist causes that push for equitable treatment and access in society. Disability activists have fought to receive equal and equitable rights under the law—though there are still political issues that enable or advance the oppression of disabled people. Although disability activism serves to dismantle ableist systems, social norms relating to the perception of disabilities are often reinforced by tropes used by the media. Since negative perceptions of disability are pervasive in modern society, disabled people have turned to self-advocacy in an attempt to push back against their marginalization. The recognition of disability as an identity that is experienced differently based on the other multi-faceted identities of the individual is one often pointed out by disabled self-advocates. The ostracization of disability from mainstream society has created the opportunity for a disability culture to emerge. While disabled activists still promote the integration of disabled people into mainstream society, several disabled-only spaces have been created to foster a disability community—such as with art, social media, and sports.

== History ==
Contemporary understandings of disability derive from concepts that arose during the scientific Enlightenment in the West. Prior to the Enlightenment, physical differences were viewed through a different lens.

=== Antiquity ===
Historically, scholars have often assumed that disabled individuals were unsupported and marginalized within their communities, based on the belief that ancient agricultural societies had to be strategic with their limited resources for survival. For instance, some historians argue that ancient Greeks actively practiced ableism through infanticide, as suggested in the writings of Plutarch, Plato, and Aristotle. Despite this, ancient Greeks demonstrated notable empathy and acceptance toward their disabled peers, contrary to the views presented in the writings of Plato and Aristotle. Literary accounts from Hippocratic physicians and archaeological evidence support the idea that the Greeks made efforts to cure and assist disabled individuals, including deformed infants, whom Plutarch claimed were promptly killed in Sparta. Since disability was not uncommon, it was frequently mentioned in literature and poetry. Disabled individuals, regardless of social rank, were largely integrated into society thanks to the variety of roles and duties available in personal life, the economy, and the military. As a result, these writings represent the philosophical ideals of Greek thinkers and do not necessarily reflect the actual practices of ancient Greece, as neither work was intended to serve as factual records.

In "The Life of Lycurgus" of Parallel Lives, Plutarch's describes infanticide as a common practice in Sparta, where the lawgiver decreed that newborn infants be taken to the lesche, likely a public building, for examination by elders. If an infant was "ill-bred and deformed", it would be sent to the apothetai, meaning "exposure places", a pit beneath Mount Taygetus. Plutarch suggested this practice occurred because a deformed infant would be seen as a liability to Sparta, a city-state known for its strict martial ethos. While Plutarch's account provides valuable insights into Spartan society, its reliability is questionable, as he lived 700 years after the events he described. Even Plutarch acknowledged that his accounts were open to dispute for this very reason. In Republic, Plato argues that in an ideal state rulers must ensure the breeding of the best men and women while discouraging those deemed inferior from reproducing. He asserts that if the children of inferior parents, or any other parents, were deformed, they should be "hidden away in a secret and unknown place, as is fitting." In Politics, Aristotle advocates that "the bodies of offspring should conform to the wishes of the lawgiver", ideally being healthy and strong, which implies a similarly ableist stance to that of Plato. He further proposes that a law should exist to prevent the raising of deformed infants, implying his endorsement of killing disabled infants.

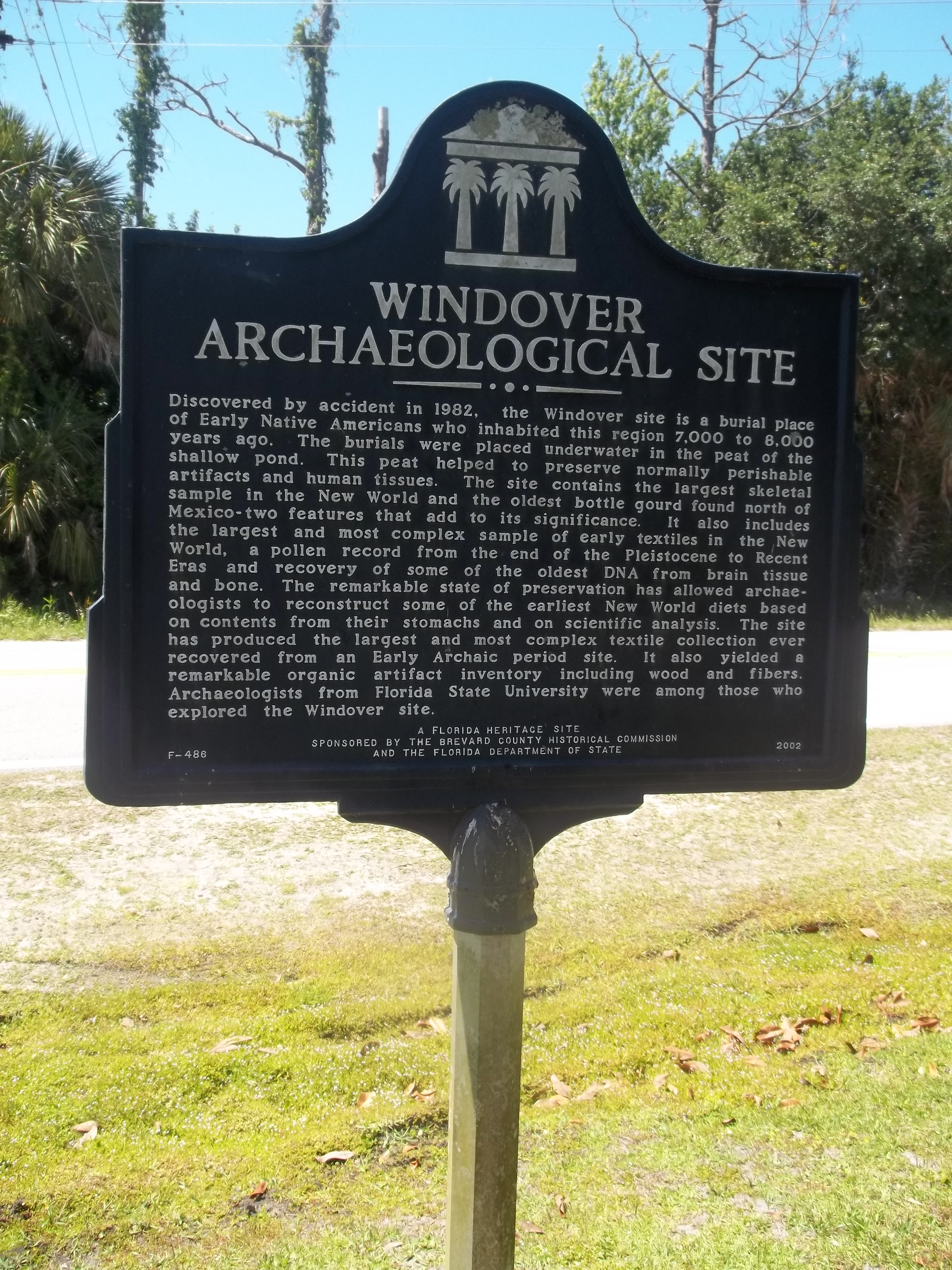
Windover Archeological Site, location of the 15-year-old with spina bifida who was taken care of in a hunter-gather community

There is considerable evidence suggesting that individuals with deformities were well cared for in antiquity. At the Windover Archeological Site, one of the skeletons was a male about 15 years old who had spina bifida. The condition meant that the boy, probably paralyzed below the waist, was taken care of in a hunter-gatherer community. Disability was not viewed as a means of divine punishment and therefore disabled individuals were neither exterminated nor discriminated against for their impairments. Many were instead employed in different levels of Mesopotamian society including working in religious temples as servants of the gods. In Ancient Egypt, staffs were frequently used in society. A common usage for them was for disabled people there to help them walk.

In Ancient Greece, regardless of gender, age, or rank, deformed citizens were largely acknowledged, embraced, and accommodated in various aspects of society. This is illustrated in the Hippocratic Corpus, a collection of treatises written by physicians during the late 5th and 4th centuries BCE as a practical manual. Therefore, it offers a more accurate depiction of how the Greeks treated disabled people. For instance, many of the treatises describe the conditions and treatments for infants with congenital anomalies or impairments, such as weasel-arm, clubfoot, and cleft conditions. Ironically, among these, the practice of infanticide or the harming of deformed infants is never mentioned. In fact, these Hippocratic physicians treated a wide range of patients throughout the Greek-speaking world from the 5th century BCE onwards. This suggests that it may not have been normal in ancient Greece to kill deformed infants, presenting a reality that contrasts with the views of Plato, Aristotle, and other ancient philosophers. Many of them expressed neutrality, if not optimism, toward deformed infants, striving to cure them while documenting their conditions.

The depiction of disabled adults or gods was common in the literature of ancient Greece. In Homer's Iliad and Odyssey, Hephaistos, a god and renowned craftsman, is described as being "lame in both legs", and he is mentioned 41 times in the Iliad and 19 times in the Odyssey. In Book 2 of the Iliad, Homer provides a detailed description of Thersites' deformity, including his bandy legs, lame foot, hunched shoulders, and balding pate, calling him "the ugliest man who came beneath Ilion". This suggests that ancient Greeks acknowledged disabled adult civilians, as disability, whether congenital or acquired, was common due to the harsh realities of ancient life and warfare. In addition to literary evidence, archaeological evidence is crucial in unfolding ancient Greeks' attitude towards deformed individuals. One that is most related to the discussion of infanticide in Ancient Greece is the Agora Bone Well, in which archaeologists found a large number of skeletons, including those of infants. Since the median age at death for these infants was only eight days old, it gives rise to the assumption that infanticide could be a possible explanation; however, scholars cannot determine whether the infants were intentionally killed or whether they died of natural causes, which was particularly common, especially during the first eight days after birth.

Archaeologists have discovered a significant number of feeding bottles throughout the Hellenic world, dating back to the Late Bronze Age. Many of these were found in the tombs of infants and young children. While scholars debate whether these bottles were used as aids for weaning infants or as symbols of condolence with no practical purpose, the shape of the bottles is particularly suited for feeding infants with cleft conditions. Depending on the severity, such infants would have had difficulty extracting milk from a nipple. This suggests that the ancient Greeks may have invested extra care and resources in raising disabled infants, rather than killing them. Contrary to previous beliefs, Greek men with disabilities or physical infirmities were generally exempt from military campaigns and battles. In Memorabilia, Xenophon suggests that men with bodily weakness or illness were considered liabilities in battle. Additionally, during the Battle of Thermopylae, the Spartan king and commander Leonidas excused Eurytus and Aristodemus from fighting, as both of them were suffering from severe eye sickness, demonstrating that men unfit for war were not forced to participate. In exceptional cases, disabled or injured men might be called upon to take on suitable roles that would contribute to the war effort.

In terms of personal life, there is no evidence to suggest that disabled Greeks were barred from marriage or reproduction. This likely stemmed from the belief that deformed parents did not necessarily produce deformed offspring; however, disabled individuals may have faced greater challenges in finding a suitable partner, as they were sometimes rejected by the family of a potential spouse. Regarding their economic situation, disabled Greeks—regardless of gender or social rank—worked in a variety of positions and professions. According to Lysias, a disabled man who uses two canes to walk "plies a craft" and runs a shop, demonstrating that disabled individuals were not deprived of the ability to support themselves. In On Joints, Hippocrates describes people with arm disabilities also being engaged in "handiwork", provided they were still able to operate tools. Plato also mentions in Laws that slaves who acquired disabilities later in life could be reassigned to other suitable roles, a principle that logically should also apply to free individuals in Greece.

Ancient Greeks were subjected to a wide range of physical consequences of aging, causing impairments and disabilities. Therefore, ancient Greeks put great effort into assisting elderly people in their communities. In some Greek states, children were legally required to care for their elderly parents, which might have included parents who were physically or mentally impaired. According to Aristotle, people who failed to do so would be imprisoned. Provisions that enabled individuals with impaired mobility to access temples and healing sanctuaries were made in ancient Greece. Specifically, by 370 BC, at the most important healing sanctuary in the wider area, the Sanctuary of Asclepius at Epidaurus, there were at least 11 permanent stone ramps that provided access to mobility-impaired visitors to nine different structures. On top of this, disabled Athenians who were unable to support themselves received monetary assistance from the state, sufficient to cover their basic needs. This indicates that some forms of charity and social welfare existed in Athens. Disability was also common among individuals of high status in ancient Greece. In the 6th century BCE, Croesus, the King of Lydia, had two sons, one of whom was either deaf or mute. He spent a considerable amount of wealth in an unsuccessful attempt to cure this son, even consulting the oracle of Apollo at Delphi. Eventually, Croesus rejected the disabled son, choosing to favor only his able-bodied son, Atys, instead. Similarly, Agesilaus, a Spartan king in the 4th century BCE, was lame in one leg but still became a general and fought in major battles. The Macedonian king, Philip II, also suffered from multiple physical impairments during his conquests; he lost one eye, fractured his collarbone, and shattered one hand and leg.

=== Middle Ages and After ===
During the Middle Ages, madness and other conditions were thought to be caused by demons. They were also thought to be part of the natural order, especially during and in the fallout of the Black Death, which wrought impairments throughout the general population. In the early modern period there was a shift to seeking biological causes for physical and mental differences, as well as heightened interest in demarcating categories: for example, Ambroise Pare, in the sixteenth century, wrote of "monsters", "prodigies", and "the maimed". The European Enlightenment's emphases on knowledge derived from reason and on the value of natural science to human progress helped spawn the birth of institutions and associated knowledge systems that observed and categorized human beings; among these, the ones significant to the development of today's concepts of disability were asylums, clinics, and prisons.

Contemporary concepts of disability are rooted in eighteenth- and nineteenth-century developments. Foremost among these was the development of clinical medical discourse, which made the human body visible as a thing to be manipulated, studied, and transformed. These worked in tandem with scientific discourses that sought to classify and categorize and, in so doing, became methods of normalization. The concept of the "norm" developed in this time period, and is signaled in the work of the Belgian statistician, sociologist, mathematician, and astronomer Adolphe Quetelet, who wrote in the 1830s of l'homme moyen – the average man. Quetelet postulated that one could take the sum of all people's attributes in a given population (such as their height or weight) and find their average and that this figure should serve as a statistical norm toward which all should aspire. This idea of the statistical norm threads through the rapid take-up of statistics gathering by Britain, the United States, and the Western European states during this time period, and it is tied to the rise of eugenics. Disability, as well as the concepts of abnormal, non-normal, and normalcy, came from this. The circulation of these concepts is evident in the popularity of the freak show, where showmen profited from exhibiting people who deviated from those norms.

With the rise of eugenics in the latter part of the nineteenth century, such deviations were viewed as dangerous to the health of entire populations. With disability viewed as part of a person's biological make-up and thus their genetic inheritance, scientists turned their attention to notions of weeding such as "deviations" out of the gene pool. Various metrics for assessing a person's genetic fitness were determined and were then used to deport, sterilize, or institutionalize those deemed unfit. People with disabilities were one of the groups targeted by the Nazi regime in Germany, resulting in approximately 250,000 disabled people being killed during the Holocaust. At the end of the Second World War, with the example of Nazi eugenics, eugenics faded from public discourse, and increasingly disability cohered into a set of attributes to which medicine could attend – whether through augmentation, rehabilitation, or treatment. In both contemporary and modern history, disability was often viewed as a by-product of incest between first-degree relatives or second-degree relatives.

A short government advisory animation on the social model of disability

Disability scholars have also pointed to the Industrial Revolution, along with the economic shift from feudalism to capitalism, as prominent historical moments in the understanding of disability. Although there was a certain amount of religious superstition surrounding disability during the Middle Ages, disabled people were still able to play significant roles in the rural production based economy, allowing them to make genuine contributions to daily economic life. The Industrial Revolution and the advent of capitalism made it so that people were no longer tied to the land and were then forced to find work that would pay a wage in order to survive. The wage system, in combination with industrialized production, transformed the way bodies were viewed as people were increasingly valued for their ability to produce like machines.

In the early 1970s, the disability rights movement became established, when disability activists began to challenge how society treated disabled people and the medical approach to disability. Due to this work, physical barriers to access were identified. These conditions functionally disabled them, and what is now known as the social model of disability emerged. Coined by Mike Oliver in 1983, this phrase distinguishes between the medical model of disability – under which an impairment needs to be fixed – and the social model of disability – under which the society that limits a person needs to be fixed.

== Theory ==
=== Disability studies ===
The academic discipline focused on theorizing disability is disability studies, which has been expanding since the late twentieth century. The field investigates the past, present, and future constructions of disability, along with advancing the viewpoint that disability is a complex social identity from which we can all gain insight. As disabilities scholar Claire Mullaney puts it, "At its broadest, disability studies encourages scholars to value disability as a form of cultural difference." Scholars of the field focus on a range of disability-related topics, such as ethics, policy and legislation, history, art of the disability community, and more. Notable scholars from the field include Tom Shakespeare, Marta Russell, Robert McRuer, Johanna Hedva, Laura Hershey, Irving Zola, and many more. Prominent disability scholar Lennard J. Davis notes that disability studies should not be considered a niche or specialized discipline, but instead is applicable to a wide range of fields and topics.

=== International Classification ===
The International Classification of Functioning, Disability and Health (ICF), produced by the World Health Organization, distinguishes between body functions (including physiological, cognitive and psychological functioning) and body structures (anatomical parts, such as the eye and related structures). Impairment in bodily structure or function is defined as involving an anomaly, defect, loss or other significant deviation from certain generally accepted population standards, which may fluctuate over time. Activity is defined as the execution of a task or action. The ICF lists nine broad domains of functioning which can be affected:

- Learning and applying knowledge
- General tasks and demands
- Communication
- Basic physical mobility, domestic life, and self-care (activities of daily living)
- Interpersonal interactions and relationships
- Community, social and civic life (employment, political participation, etc.)
- Other major life areas

In concert with disability scholars, the introduction to the ICF states that a variety of conceptual models have been proposed to understand and explain disability and functioning, which it seeks to integrate. These models include the following:

=== Medical model ===
The medical model views disability as a problem of the person, directly caused by disease, trauma, or other health conditions which therefore requires sustained medical care in the form of individual treatment by professionals. The medical model focuses on finding causes and cures for disabilities. In the medical model, management of the disability is aimed at a "cure", or the individual's adjustment and behavioral change that would lead to an "almost-cure" or effective cure. The individual, in this case, must overcome their disability by medical care. In the medical model, medical care is viewed as the main issue, and at the political level, the principal response is that of modifying or reforming healthcare policy.

==== Causes ====
There are many causes of disability that often affect basic activities of daily living, such as eating, dressing, transferring, and maintaining personal hygiene; or advanced activities of daily living such as shopping, food preparation, driving, or working; however, causes of disability are usually determined by a person's capability to perform the activities of daily life. As Marta Russell and Ravi Malhotra argue, "The 'medicalization' of disablement and the tools of classification clearly played an important role in establishing divisions between the 'disabled' and the 'able-bodied.'" This positions disability as a problem to be solved via medical intervention, which hinders our understanding about what disability can mean.

There is not a fully exhaustive list and many injuries and medical problems cause disability. Some causes of disability, such as injuries, may resolve over time and are considered temporary disabilities. An acquired disability is the result of impairments that occur suddenly or chronically during the lifespan, as opposed to being born with the impairment. Invisible disabilities may not be obviously noticeable. For the purposes of the Americans with Disabilities Act of 1990, the US Equal Employment Opportunity Commission regulations provide a list of conditions that should easily (Note: words such as "easily" and "obviously" are used several times throughout the Regulations To Implement the Equal Employment Provisions of the Americans With Disabilities Act, as Amended to refer to "impairments (...) for which the individualized assessment [concerning the definition of disability] should be particularly simple and straightforward."(Section 1630.2(j)(3) (caput))) be concluded to be disabilities: amputation, attention deficit hyperactivity disorder (ADHD), autism, bipolar disorder, blindness, cancer, cerebral palsy, deafness, diabetes, epilepsy, HIV/AIDS, intellectual disability, major depressive disorder, mobility impairments requiring a wheelchair, multiple sclerosis, muscular dystrophy, obsessive–compulsive disorder (OCD), post-traumatic stress disorder (PTSD), spina bifida, and schizophrenia.

==== Cures ====
The medical model focuses heavily on finding treatments, cures, or rehabilitative practices for disabled people.

===== Assistive technology =====
Assistive technology is a generic term for devices and modifications (for a person or within a society) that help overcome or remove a disability. The first recorded example of the use of a prosthesis dates to at least 1800 BC. The wheelchair dates from the 17th century. The curb cut is a related structural innovation. Other examples are standing frames, text telephones, accessible keyboards, large print, braille, and speech recognition software. Disabled people often develop adaptations which can be personal (e.g. strategies to suppress tics in public) or community (e.g. sign language in d/Deaf communities).

Universal design of products and environments, such as curb cuts, can make them accessible to all people, regardless of levels of disability.

As the personal computer has become more ubiquitous, various organizations have formed to develop software and hardware to make computers more accessible for disabled people. Some software and hardware, such as Voice Finger, Freedom Scientific's JAWS, the Free and Open Source alternative Orca etc. have been specifically designed for disabled people while other software and hardware, such as Nuance's Dragon NaturallySpeaking, were not developed specifically for disabled people, but can be used to increase accessibility. The LOMAK keyboard was designed in New Zealand specifically for persons with disabilities. The World Wide Web consortium recognized a need for International Standards for Web Accessibility for persons with disabilities and created the Web Accessibility Initiative (WAI). As at Dec 2012 the standard is WCAG 2.0 (WCAG = Web Content Accessibility Guidelines).

=== Social model ===
The social model of disability sees "disability" as a socially created problem and a matter of the full integration of individuals into society. In this model, disability is not an attribute of an individual, but rather a complex collection of conditions, created by the social environment. The management of the problem requires social action and it is the collective responsibility of society to create a society in which limitations for disabled people are minimal. Disability is both cultural and ideological in creation. According to the social model, equal access for someone with an impairment/disability is a human rights concern. The social model of disability has come under criticism. While recognizing the importance played by the social model in stressing the responsibility of society, scholars, including Tom Shakespeare, point out the limits of the model and urge the need for a new model that will overcome the "medical vs. social" dichotomy. The limitations of this model mean that often the vital services and information persons with disabilities face are simply not available, often due to limited economic returns in supporting them. Some say medical humanities is a fruitful field where the gap between the medical and the social model of disability might be bridged.

==== Social construction ====
The social construction of disability is the idea that disability is constructed by social expectations and institutions rather than biological differences. Highlighting the ways society and institutions construct disability is one of the main focuses of this idea. In the same way that race and gender are not biologically fixed, neither is disability. Around the early 1970s, sociologists, notably Eliot Friedson, began to argue that labeling theory and social deviance could be applied to disability studies. This led to the creation of the social construction of disability theory. The social construction of disability is the idea that disability is constructed as the social response to a deviance from the norm. The medical industry is the creator of the ill and disabled social role. Medical professionals and institutions, who wield expertise over health, have the ability to define health and physical and mental norms. When an individual has a feature that creates an impairment, restriction, or limitation from reaching the social definition of health, the individual is labeled as disabled. Under this idea, disability is not defined by the physical features of the body but by a deviance from the social convention of health. The social construction of disability would argue that the medical model of disability's view that a disability is an impairment, restriction, or limitation is wrong. Instead what is seen as a disability is just a difference in the individual from what is considered "normal" in society.

=== Other models ===
- The political/relational model is an alternative to and critical engagement with both the social and medical models. This analytic posed by Alison Kafer shows not only how the "problem" of disability "is located in inaccessible buildings, discriminatory attitudes, and ideological systems that attribute normalcy and deviance to particular minds and bodies" but also how mind and bodily impairments can still have disabling effects. Furthermore, the political/relational model frames the medicalization of disabled folks as political in nature given it should always be interrogated.
- The spectrum model refers to the range of audibility, sensibility, and visibility under which people function. The model asserts that disability does not necessarily mean a reduced spectrum of operations. Rather, disability is often defined according to thresholds set on a continuum of disability.
- The moral model refers to the attitude that people are morally responsible for their own disability. For example, disability may be seen as a result of bad actions of parents if congenital, or as a result of practicing witchcraft if not. Echoes of this can be seen in the doctrine of karma in Eastern and New Age religions. It also includes notions that a disability gives a person "special abilities to perceive, reflect, transcend, be spiritual".
- The expert/professional model has provided a traditional response to disability issues and can be seen as an offshoot of the medical model. Within its framework, professionals follow a process of identifying the impairment and its limitations (using the medical model), and taking the necessary action to improve the position of the disabled person. This has tended to produce a system in which an authoritarian, over-active service provider prescribes and acts for a passive client.
- The tragedy/charity model depicts disabled people as victims of circumstance who are deserving of pity. This, along with the medical model, are the models used by most people with no acknowledged disability to define and explain disability.
- The legitimacy model views disability as a value-based determination about which explanations for the atypical are legitimate for membership in the disability category. This viewpoint allows for multiple explanations and models to be considered as purposive and viable.
- The social adapted model states although a person's disability poses some limitations in an able-bodied society, often the surrounding society and environment are more limiting than the disability itself.
- The economic model defines disability in terms of reduced ability to work, the related loss of productivity and economic effects on the individual, employer and society in general.
- The empowering model (also, customer model or supported decision making) allows for the person with a disability and their family to decide the course of their treatment. This turns the professional into a service provider whose role is to offer guidance and carry out the client's decisions. This model "empowers" the individual to pursue their own goals.
- The market model of disability is minority rights and consumerist model of disability that recognizing disabled people and their stakeholders as representing a large group of consumers, employees, and voters. This model looks to personal identity to define disability and empowers people to chart their own destiny in everyday life, with a particular focus on economic empowerment. Based on US Census data, this model shows that there are 1.2 billion people in the world who consider themselves to have a disability. "This model states that due to the size of the demographic, companies and governments will serve the desires, pushed by demand as the message becomes prevalent in the cultural mainstream."
- The consumer model of disability is based upon the "rights-based" model and claims that disabled people should have equal rights and access to products, goods, and services offered by businesses. The consumer model extends the rights-based model by proposing that businesses, not only accommodate customers with disabilities under the requirements of legislation but that businesses actively seek, market to, welcome and fully engage disabled people in all aspects of business service activities. The model suggests that all business operations, for example, websites, policies, procedures, mission statements, emergency plans, programs, and services, should integrate access and inclusion practices. Furthermore, these access and inclusion practices should be based on established customer service access and inclusion standards that embrace and support the active engagement of people of all abilities in business offerings. In this regard, specialized products and specialized services become important, such as auxiliary means, prostheses, special foods, domestic help, and assisted living.
- Different theories revolve around prejudice, stereotyping, discrimination, and stigma related to disability. One of the more popular ones, as put by Weiner, Perry, and Magnusson's (1988) work with attribution theory, physical stigmas are perceived as to be uncontrollable and elicit pity and desire to help, whereas, mental-behavioral stigmas are considered to be controllable and therefore elicit anger and desire to neglect the individuals with disabilities.
- The just-world fallacy talks about how a person is viewed as deserving the disability. And because it is the fault of that person, an observer does not feel obligated to feel bad for them or to help them.

== Terminology ==
=== People-first language ===
People-first or person-first language is one way to talk about disability which some people prefer. Using people-first language is said to put the person before the disability. Those individuals who prefer people-first language would prefer to be called, "a person with a disability". This style is reflected in major legislation on disability rights, including the Americans with Disabilities Act and the UN Convention on the Rights of Persons with Disabilities. "Cerebral Palsy: A Guide for Care" at the University of Delaware describes people-first language:

The American Psychological Association style guide states that, when identifying a person with a disability, the person's name or pronoun should come first, and descriptions of the disability should be used so that the disability is identified, but is not modifying the person. Acceptable examples included "a woman with Down syndrome" or "a man who has schizophrenia". It also states that a person's adaptive equipment should be described functionally as something that assists a person, not as something that limits a person, for example, "a woman who uses a wheelchair" rather than "a woman in/confined to a wheelchair".

People-first terminology is used in the UK in the form "people with impairments" (such as "people with visual impairments"); however other individuals and groups prefer identity-first language to emphasize how a disability can impact people's identities.

Which style of language used varies between different countries, groups and individuals. In the UK, identity-first language is generally preferred over people-first language. The use of people-first terminology has given rise to the use of the acronym PWD to refer to person(s) (or people) with disabilities (or disability),

=== Identity-first language ===
Identity-first language describes the person as "disabled." Disabled and neurodivergent people tend to prefer identity-first language. Some people argue that this fits the social model of disability better than people-first language, as it emphasizes that the person is disabled not by their body, but by a world that does not accommodate them. Advocates argue that under the social model, while someone's impairment (for example, having a spinal cord injury) is an individual property, "disability" is something created by external societal factors such as a lack of accessibility. This distinction between the individual property of impairment and the social property of disability is central to the social model.

Identity-first language is more commonly used by disabled communities and disabled people with stronger ties to disabled community, culture, and identity. The term "disabled people" as a political construction is also widely used by international organizations of disabled people, such as Disabled Peoples' International. Using the identity-first language also parallels how people talk about other aspects of identity and diversity. For example:

In the autism community, many self-advocates and their allies prefer terminology such as 'Autistic,' 'Autistic person,' or 'Autistic individual' because we understand autism as an inherent part of an individual's identity – the same way one refers to 'Muslims,' 'African-Americans,' 'Lesbian/Gay/Bisexual/Transgender/Queer,' 'Chinese,' 'gifted,' 'athletic,' or 'Jewish.'

Similarly, Deaf communities in the US reject people-first language in favor of identity-first language. In 2021, the US Association on Higher Education and Disability (AHEAD) announced their decision to use identity-first language in their materials, explaining: "Identity-first language challenges negative connotations by claiming disability directly. Identity-first language references the variety that exists in how our bodies and brains work with a myriad of conditions that exist, and the role of inaccessible or oppressive systems, structures, or environments in making someone disabled."

Due to some disabled people preferring person-first language, unless a preference is stated by the community or individual in question, advocates state best practice is to use both and alternate.

=== Neurodiversity ===
In the 2020s, the term "neurodiversity" has been embraced by many adults with various neurological differences and neurotypes. In the original conceptualization, "neurodiversity" refers to the belief that "no two brains or minds function in exactly the same way." "Neurodivergent," often contrasted with "neurotypical," refers to a brain or mind that functions or interacts with social norms in a way that deviates from culturally normative expectations.

Many sources attribute the term neurodiversity as having first been seen in print in a 1991 chapter in a work by Judy Singer, an Australian sociologist. In 2024, a group of autistic academics challenged this concept by suggesting that the term had evolved collectively since the mid-1990s, led primarily by Autistic self-advocates. Like the social model of disability, the neurodiversity movement, as a civil rights movement, seeks to fight the stigma associated with seeing neurobiological differences as disorders or deficits.

Neurodiversity refers to the natural variation in how people and individuals think, process information, and experience the world... Neurodiversity refers to the virtually infinite neurocognitive variability within Earth's human population... Neurodiversity is made up of the terms "neuro" (nerves) and "diversity." This refers to the assumption and attitude that neurobiological differences in the brain are part of the spectrum of our development and do not represent a disorder or illness.

— Marc Helmold & Malte Martensen, Leadership in Neurodiversity and Neurodivergence, p. 1-14

This conceptualization does not come without debate in psychology, as some academics have challenged whether or not an extreme view of neurodiversity suggests that neurodevelopmental disorders "are not disorders or illnesses at all."

=== Handicap ===
The term handicap derives from the medieval game hand-in-cap, in which two players trade possessions, and a third, neutral person judges the difference of value between the possessions. The concept of a neutral person evening up the odds was extended to handicap racing in the mid-18th century, where horses carry different weights based on the umpire's estimation of what would make them run equally. In the early 20th century the word gained the additional meaning of describing a disability, in the sense that a person with a handicap was carrying a heavier burden than normal. This concept, then, adds to the conception of disability as a burden, or individual problem, rather than a societal problem.

The UK government advises civil servants to avoid this term.

=== Accessibility and inclusion ===
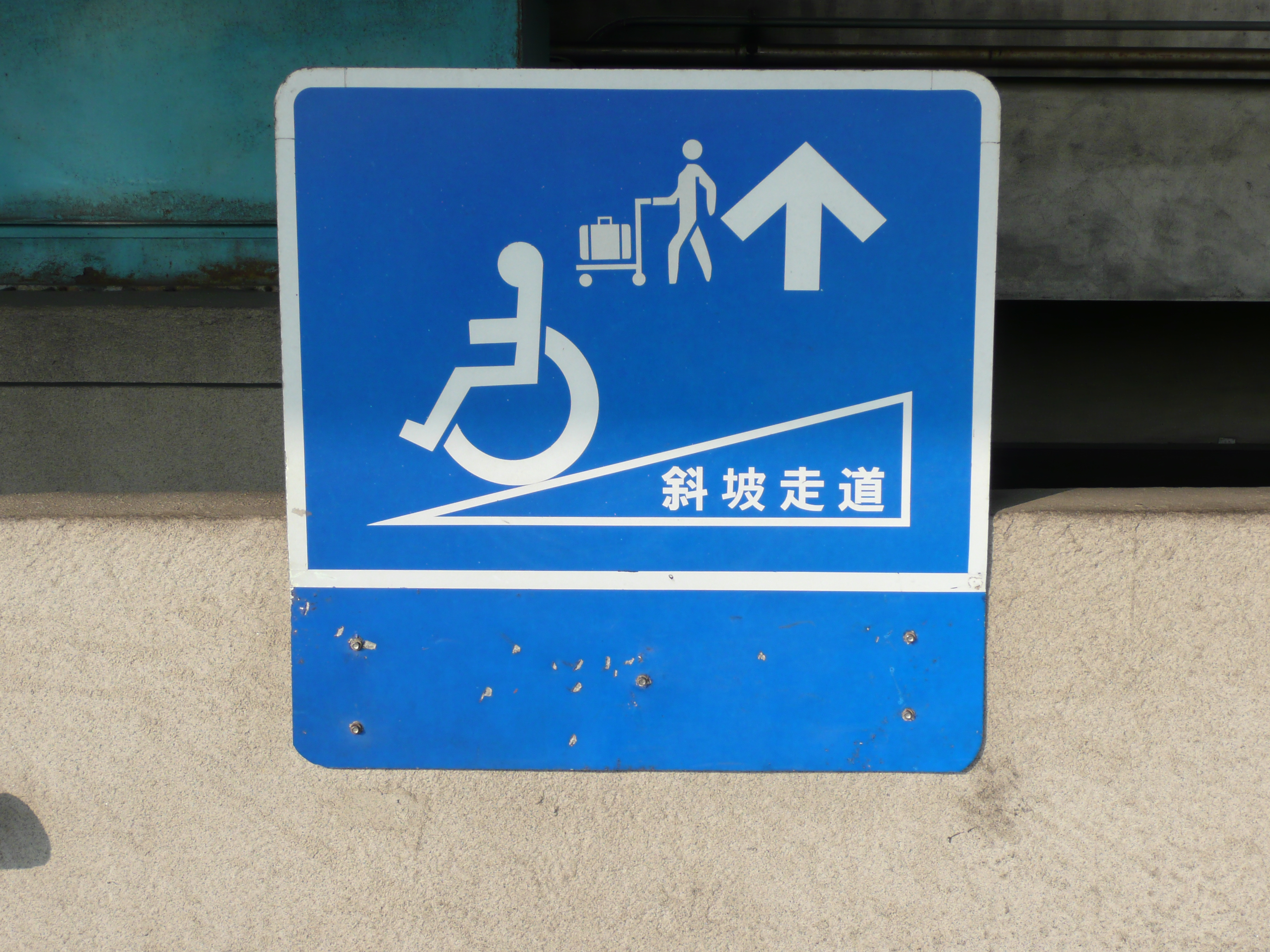
A sign in Taiwan showing a wheelchair accessibility ramp

Accessibility is the degree to which a product, service or environment is available for use to the people that need it. People with certain types of disabilities struggle to get equal access to some things in society. For example, a blind person cannot read printed paper ballots, and therefore does not have access to voting that requires paper ballots. Another example can be that a person in a wheelchair cannot ascend stairs and therefore does not have access to buildings without ramps. Accessible access to health clubs and fitness centers has been observed to be especially problematic. Accessibility also enables inclusion. An example is redesigning the education system to employ access to learning for everyone that teaches everything and recognition of the credentials from various educational institutions in addition to honoring the interconnectness of all learning backgrounds.

=== Universal Design Vs. Accommodations ===
Accommodation is a change that improves access to an individual or group. For example, if voting ballots are available in braille or on a text-to-speech machine, or if another person reads the ballot to the blind person and recorded the choices, then the blind person would have access to voting. On the other hand, Universal Design goal is to make environments inclusive to the greatest extent possible differing from accommodations.

“Universal design” means the design of products, environments, programmes and services to be usable by all people, to the greatest extent possible, without the need for adaptation or specialized design. “Universal design” shall not exclude assistive devices for particular groups of persons with disabilities where this is needed."

— UN Convention on the Rights of Persons with Disabilities, Article 2

"Reasonable accommodation" means necessary and appropriate modification and adjustments not imposing a disproportionate or undue burden, where needed in a particular case, to ensure to persons with disabilities the enjoyment or exercise on an equal basis with others of all human rights and fundamental freedoms

— UN Convention on the Rights of Persons with Disabilities, Article 2

=== Invisible disability ===
Invisible disabilities, also known as hidden disabilities or non-visible disabilities (NVD), are disabilities that are not immediately apparent, or seeable. They are often chronic illnesses and conditions that significantly impair normal activities of daily living. Invisible disabilities can hinder a person's efforts to go to school, work, socialize, and more. Some examples of invisible disabilities include intellectual disabilities, autism spectrum disorder, attention deficit hyperactivity disorder, fibromyalgia, mental disorders, asthma, epilepsy, allergies, migraines, arthritis, and chronic fatigue syndrome. Employment discrimination is reported to play a significant part in the high rate of unemployment among those with a diagnosis of mental illness.

=== Episodic disability ===
People with health conditions such as arthritis, bipolar disorder, HIV, or multiple sclerosis may have periods of wellness between episodes of illness. During the illness episodes people's ability to perform normal tasks, such as work, can be intermittent.

== Disability activism ==
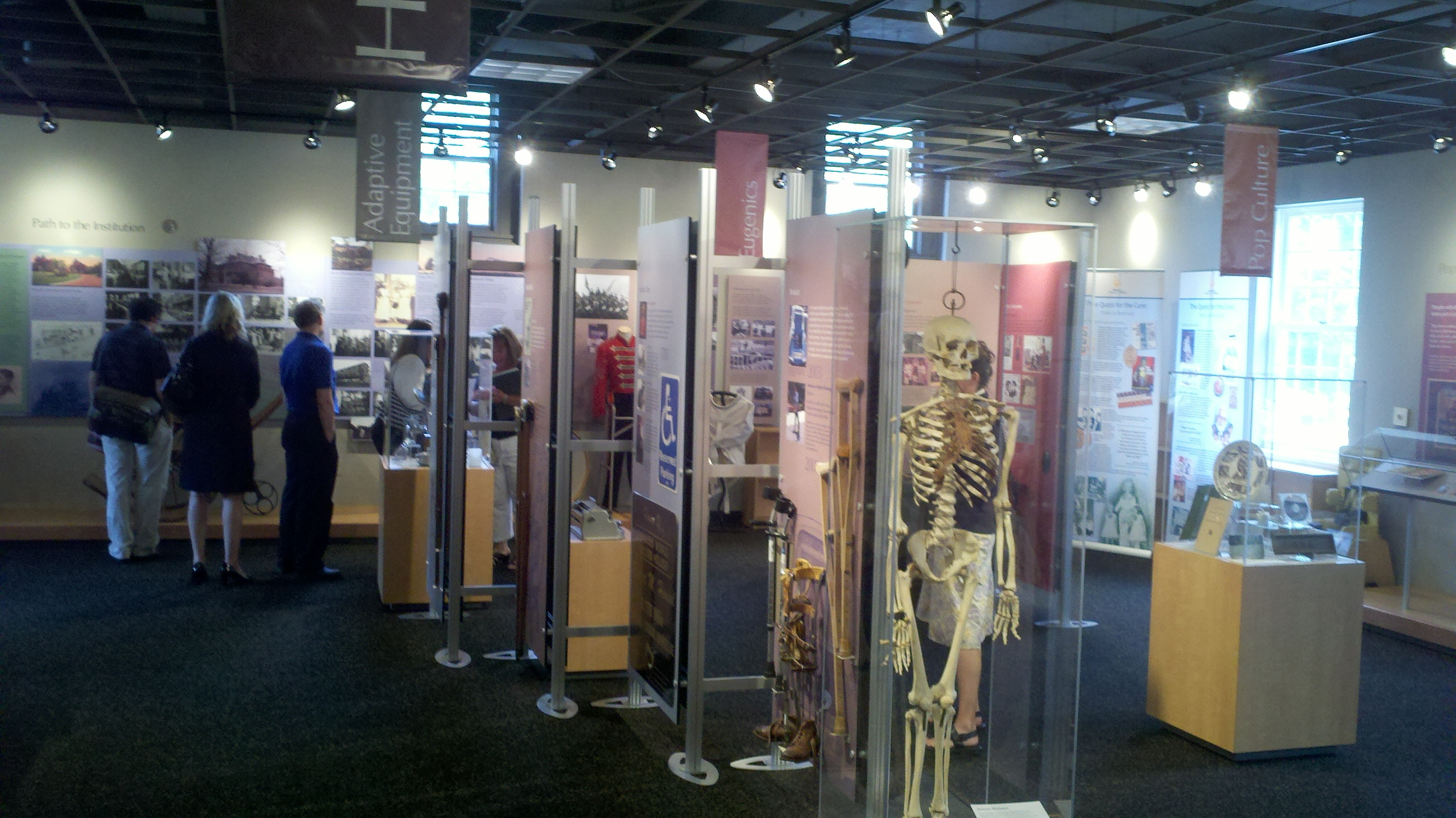
Museum of disABILITY History, Buffalo, New York

Disability activists have drawn attention to several issues. Disability activism itself has led to the revision of appropriate language, when discussing disability and disabled people. For example, the medical classification of "retarded" has since been disregarded due to its negative implications. Moreover, disability activism has also led to pejorative language being reclaimed by disabled people. Mairs (1986) explained how disabled people may choose to self-describe themselves as a "cripple". This may appear surprising that they are using stereotypically negative language associated with disability to describe themselves; however, the purpose is to reclaim the "disabled identity" from medical professionals, and realign it with the preferred language of disabled people. The reclamation of language demonstrated above positions itself within the social model, as it highlights how as a society we construct concepts and perceptions of disability. The rainbow-colored infinity symbol represents the diversity of the autism spectrum as well as the greater neurodiversity movement.

=== Rights and policies ===
==== Rights movement ====
The disability rights movement aims to secure equal opportunities and equal rights for disabled people. The specific goals and demands of the movement are accessibility and safety in transportation, architecture, and the physical environment; equal opportunities in independent living, employment, education, and housing; and freedom from abuse, neglect, and violations of patients' rights. Effective civil rights legislation is sought to secure these opportunities and rights.

The early disability rights movement was dominated by the medical model of disability, where emphasis was placed on curing or treating disabled people so that they would adhere to the social norm, but starting in the 1960s, rights groups began shifting to the social model of disability, where disability is interpreted as an issue of discrimination, thereby paving the way for rights groups to achieve equality through legal means. Advocacy for disability issues and accessibility in the republics of the former Soviet Union has become more organized and influential in policymaking.

==== Disability Justice movement ====
Evolving from the disability rights movement is the Disability Justice movement. The term "Disability Justice" was coined in 2005 by LGBTQ disabled women of color Mia Mingus, Patricia Berne, and Stacey Milbern, who sought to build an anti-ableist movement with a larger emphasis on intersectionality than mainstream disability rights, as to center marginalized voices. Their group, the Disability Justice Collective, also included notable disability activists such as Sebastian Margaret; Leroy F. Moore Jr., well known for his poetry and founding of the Krip Hop movement; and Eli Clare, well known for popularizing the bodymind concept within disability studies. The Disability Justice movement aims to improve the lives of disabled people through prioritizing collective liberation, as opposed to prioritizing legislative change and traditional civil rights. This framework, dubbed the "second wave" of disability rights, seeks to examine the many systems of oppression that are intertwined with ableism, such as colonialism, white supremacy, and heteropatriarchal capitalism.

==== UN Convention on the Rights of Persons with Disabilities ====
On December 13, 2006, the United Nations formally agreed on the Convention on the Rights of Persons with Disabilities, the first human rights treaty of the 21st century, to protect and enhance the rights and opportunities of the world's estimated 650 million disabled people. As of December 2025, 193 nations have ratified or accepted accession to the convention. Countries that sign the convention are required to adopt national laws, and remove old ones, so that persons with disabilities will, for example, have equal rights to education, employment, and cultural life; to the right to own and inherit property; to not be discriminated against in marriage, etc.; and to not be unwilling subjects in medical experiments. UN officials, including the High Commissioner for Human Rights, have characterized the bill as representing a paradigm shift in attitudes toward a more rights-based view of disability in line with the social model.

==== International Year of Disabled Persons ====
In 1976, the United Nations began planning for its International Year for Disabled Persons (1981), later renamed the International Year of Disabled Persons. Some disability activists used the year to highlight various injustices, such as in Australia where beauty pageants were targeted in order to, in the words of activist Leslie Hall, "challenge the notion of beauty" and "reject the charity ethic. The UN Decade of Disabled Persons (1983–1993) featured a World Programme of Action Concerning Disabled Persons. In 1979, Frank Bowe was the only person with a disability representing any country in the planning of IYDP-1981. Today, many countries have named representatives who are themselves individuals with disabilities. The decade was closed in an address before the General Assembly by Robert Davila. Both Bowe and Davila are Deaf. In 1984, UNESCO accepted sign language for use in the education of deaf children and youth.

==== Policies in former Soviet Union republics ====
UN programs and OSCE work to align policy and programs in countries that were part of the former Soviet Union with the Convention on the Rights of Persons with Disabilities.

=== Political issues ===
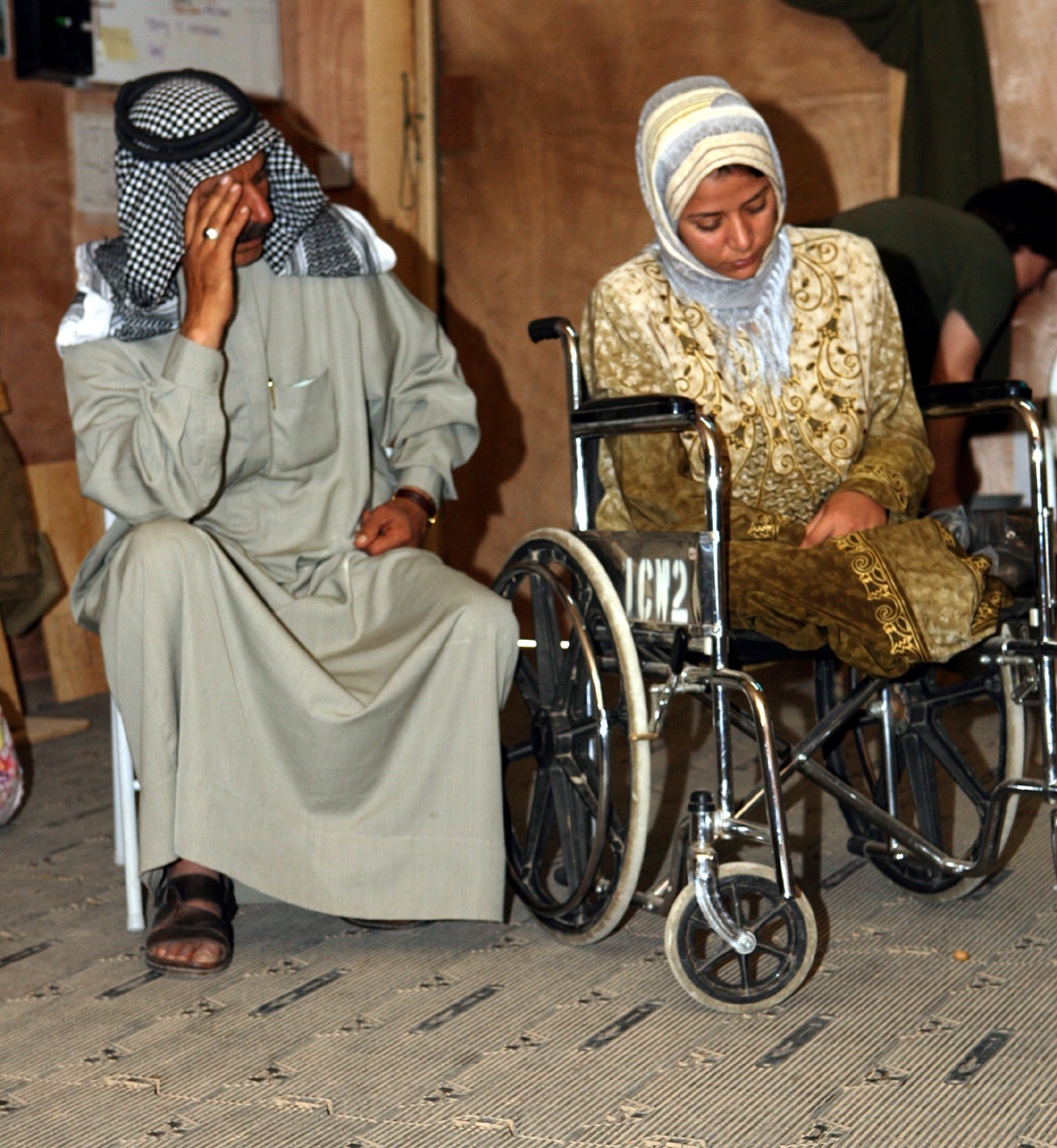
A 28-year-old Iraqi woman who lost both of her legs during the Iraq War in 2005

Political rights, social inclusion and citizenship have come to the fore in developed and some developing countries. The debate has, some instances, moved beyond a concern about the perceived cost of maintaining dependent disabled people to finding effective ways to ensure that disabled people can participate in and contribute to society in all spheres of life.

In developing nations, where the vast bulk of the estimated 650 million disabled people reside, a great deal of work is needed to address concerns ranging from accessibility and education to self-empowerment, self-supporting employment, and beyond. Into the 21st century, the efforts of disability rights activists around the world who focused on obtaining full citizenship for disabled people have come under academic study and gained some level of public recognition in many places, such as in the United States. There are obstacles in many countries in getting full employment and public perception of disabled people varies.

==== Abuse ====
Disability abuse happens when a person is abused physically, financially, verbally or mentally due to the person having a disability. As many disabilities are not visible (for example, asthma, learning disabilities) some abusers cannot rationalize the non-physical disability with a need for understanding, support, and so on. As the prevalence of disability and the cost of supporting disability increases with medical advancement and longevity in general, this aspect of society becomes of greater political importance. How political parties treat their disabled constituents may become a measure of a political party's understanding of disability, particularly in the social model of disability.

==== Insurance ====
Disability benefit, or disability pension, is a major kind of disability insurance that is provided by government agencies to people who are temporarily or permanently unable to work due to a disability. In the US, the disability benefit is provided in the category of Supplemental Security Income. In Canada, it is within the Canada Pension Plan. Following a long nationwide campaign involving hundreds of thousands of people the National Disability Insurance Scheme was introduced in Australia in 2013 to fund a number of supports.In other countries, disability benefits may be provided under social security systems. Costs of disability pensions are steadily growing in Western countries, mainly in Europe and the United States. It was reported that, in the UK, expenditure on disability pensions accounted for 0.9% of gross domestic product (GDP) in 1980; two decades later it had reached 2.6% of GDP. Several studies have reported a link between increased absence from work due to sickness and elevated risk of future disability pension.

A study by researchers in Denmark suggests that information on self-reported days of absence due to sickness can be used to effectively identify future potential groups for disability pension. These studies may provide useful information for policymakers, case managing authorities, employers, and physicians. In Switzerland, social policies in the field of disability have been significantly reshaped over the last two decades by reducing the number of allowances awarded and by increasing the recourse to vocational rehabilitation measures. Drawing on interviews conducted with individuals who have been involved in programs set up by Swiss disability insurance, a study highlights their uncertainties and concerns relating to their place in society, as well as their reactions to disability insurance's interventions. Private, for-profit disability insurance plays a role in providing incomes to disabled people, but the nationalized programs are the safety net that catch most claimants.

==== Employment ====
Studies have illustrated a correlation between disability and poverty. Notably, jobs offered to disabled people are scarce. Marta Russell notes that "[a] primary basis for oppression of disabled persons (those who could work with accommodations) is their exclusion from exploitation as wage laborers."

A 2024 study covering 65 countries found that, after accounting for age and education, individuals with disabilities were less likely to participate in the labour market, and that when they did, they faced higher unemployment rates and were more likely to be self-employed. Furthermore, in a 30-country wage subsample, employees with disabilities also earned 12 per cent less per hour on average, and three quarters of that gap was not explained by differences in age, education and occupation.

===== Intellectual disability =====
Many countries have programs which aid intellectually disabled (ID) people to acquire skills needed in the workforce. Such programs include sheltered workshops and adult day care programs. Sheltered programs consist of daytime activities such as gardening, manufacturing, and assembling. These activities facilitate routine-oriented tasks that in turn allow ID people to gain experience before entering the workforce. Similarly, adult day care programs also include day time activities; however, these activities are based in an educational environment where ID people are able to engage in educational, physical, and communication-based tasks which helps facilitate communication, memory, and general living skills. In addition, adult day care programs arranged community activities by scheduling field trips to public places (e.g. zoos and movie theaters). Despite both programs providing essential skills for intellectually disabled people prior to entering the workforce, researchers have found that ID people prefer to be involved with community-integrated employment. Community-integrated employment opportunities are offered to ID people at minimum or higher wages in a variety of occupations ranging from customer service, clerical, janitorial, hospitality, and manufacturing positions. ID employees work alongside employees without disabilities who are able to assist them with training. All three options allow intellectually disabled people to develop and exercise social skills that are vital to everyday life; however, it is not guaranteed that ID employees receive the same treatment as employees without ID; according to Lindstrom et al., community-integrated employees are less likely to receive raises, and only 26% are able to retain full-time status.

Finding a stable workforce poses additional challenges. A study published in the Journal of Applied Research in Intellectual Disability indicated that although finding a job may be difficult, stabilizing a job is even harder. Chadsey-Rusch proposed that securing employment for ID people requires adequate production skills and effective social skills. Other underlying factors for job loss include structural factors and worker-workplace integration. As stated by Kilsby, limited structural factors can affect a multitude of factors in a job, such as a restricted number of hours an ID person is allowed to work. This in return, according to Fabian et al., leads to a lack of opportunity to develop relationships with coworkers or to better integrate within the workplace. Nevertheless, those who are unable to stabilize a job often are left discouraged. According to the same study conducted by JARID, many who had participated found that they had made smaller incomes when compared to their co-workers, had an excess of time throughout their days because they did not have work. This renders ID people unable to provide for themselves, including basic necessities such as food, medical care, transportation, and housing. They also had feelings of hopelessness and failure. According to the US National Organization on Disability, not only ID people face constant discouragement but many live below the poverty line because they are unable to find or stabilize employment and because of employee restricting factors placed on ID workers.

==== Poverty ====
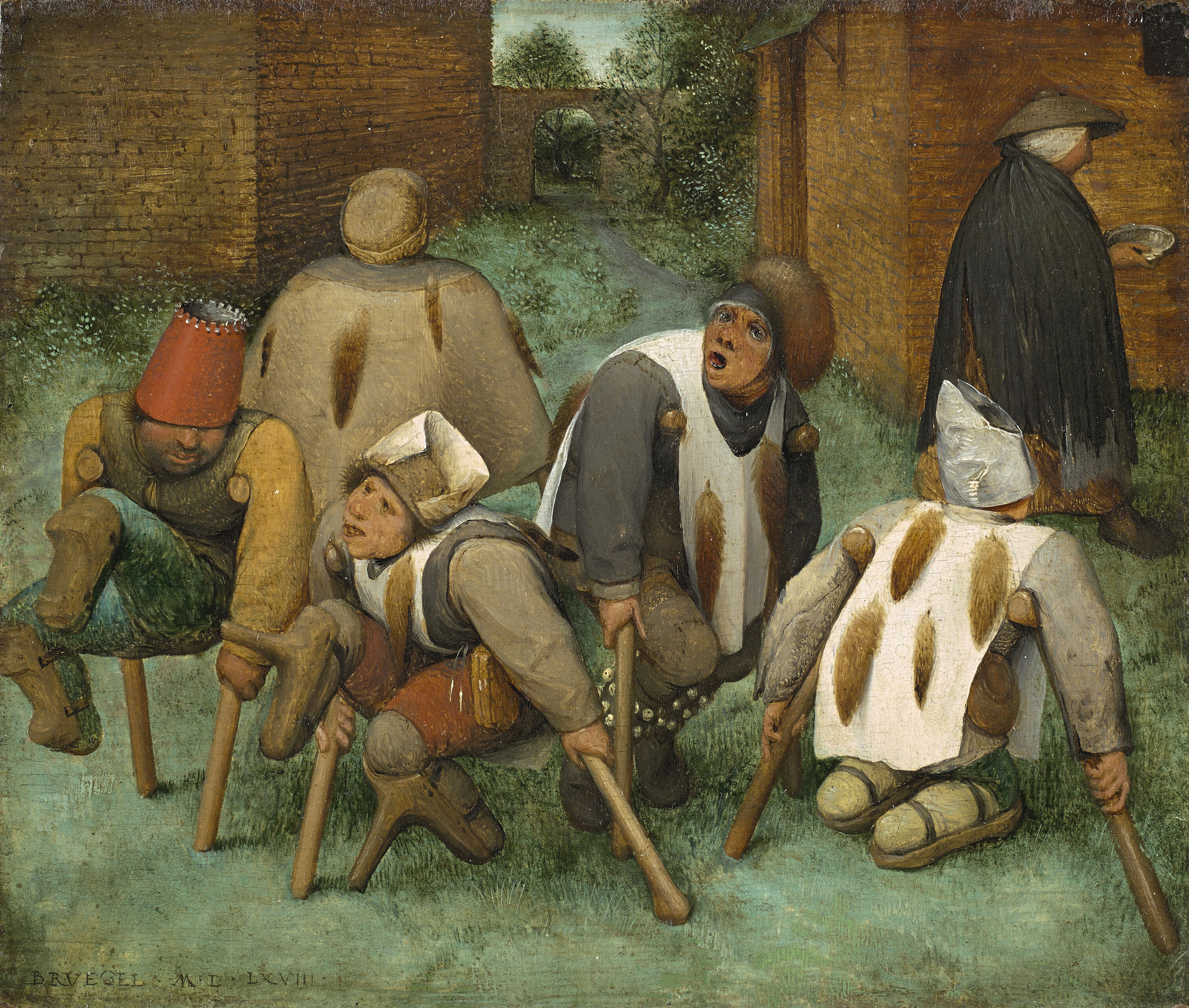
The Cripples, Pieter Bruegel, 1568

The poverty rate for working-age people with disabilities is nearly two and a half times higher than that for people without disabilities. Disability and poverty may form a vicious circle, in which physical barriers and stigma of disability make it more difficult to get income, which in turn diminishes access to health care and other necessities for a healthy life. In societies without state funded health and social services, living with a disability could require spending on medication and frequent health care visits, in-home personal assistance, and adaptive devices and clothing, along with the usual costs of living. The World Report on Disability indicates that half of all disabled people cannot afford health care, compared to a third of able-bodied people. In countries without public services for adults with disabilities, their families may be impoverished.

==== Disasters ====
There is limited research knowledge, but many anecdotal reports, on what happens when disasters impact disabled people. Individuals with disabilities are greatly affected by disasters. Those with physical disabilities can be at risk when evacuating if assistance is not available. Individuals with cognitive impairments may struggle with understanding instructions that must be followed in the event a disaster occurs. All of these factors can increase the degree of variation of risk in disaster situations with disabled individuals. Research studies have consistently found discrimination against individuals with disabilities during all phases of a disaster cycle. The most common limitation is that people cannot physically access buildings or transportation, as well as access disaster-related services. The exclusion of these individuals is caused in part by the lack of disability-related training provided to emergency planners and disaster relief personnel.

== Disability in society ==
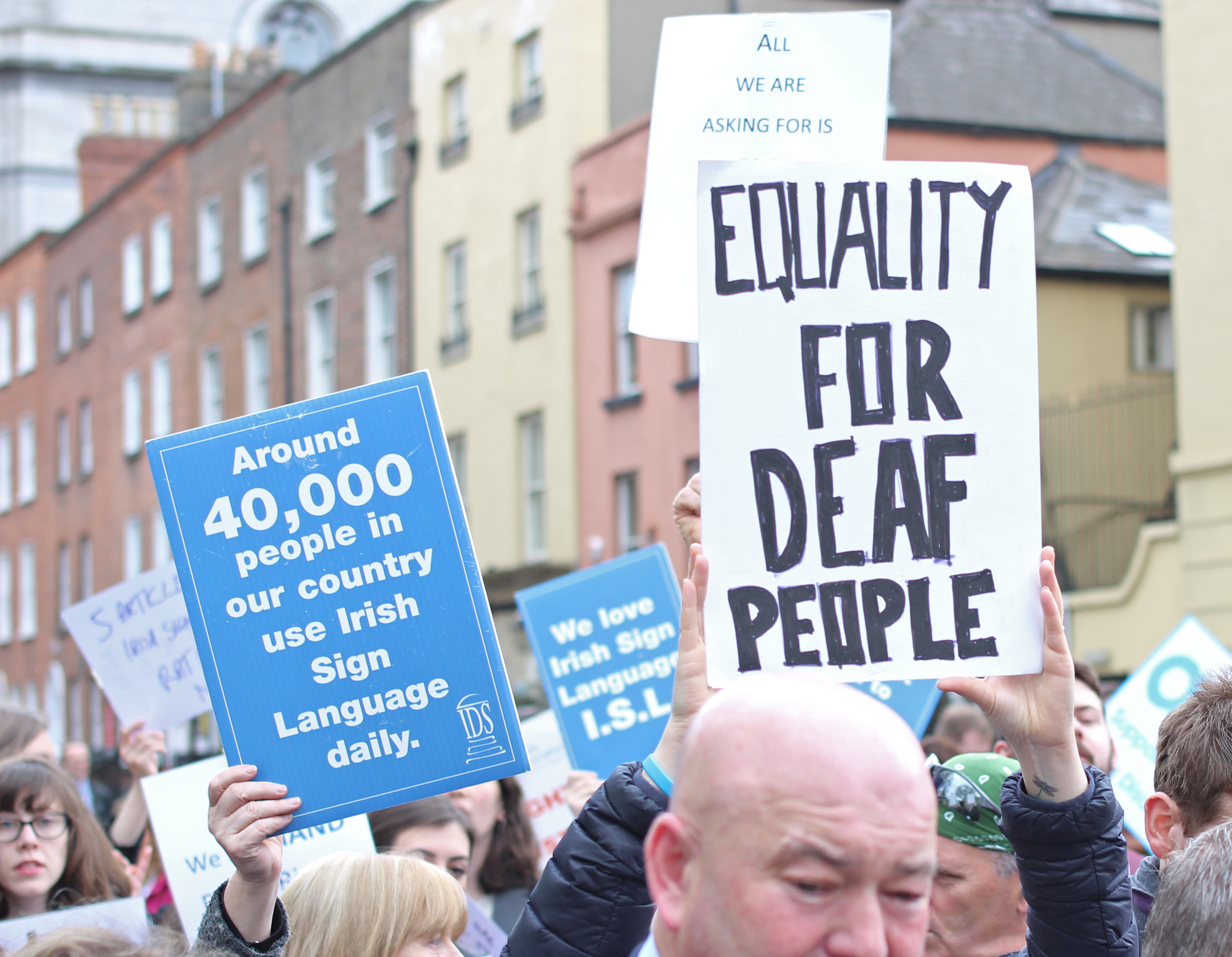
Protest for the recognition of Irish Sign Language

=== Aging ===
To a certain degree, physical impairments and changing mental states are almost ubiquitously experienced by people as they age. Aging populations are often stigmatized for having a high prevalence of disability. Kathleen Woodward, writing in Key Words for Disability Studies, explains the phenomenon as follows:

Aging is invoked rhetorically – at times ominously – as a pressing reason why disability should be of crucial interest to all of us (we are all getting older, we will all be disabled eventually), thereby inadvertently reinforcing the damaging and dominant stereotype of aging as solely an experience of decline and deterioration. But little attention has been given to the imbrication of aging and disability.

In Feminist, Queer, Crip, Alison Kafer mentions aging and the anxiety associated with it. According to Kafer, this anxiety stems from ideas of normalcy. She says:

Anxiety about aging, for example, can be seen as a symptom of compulsory able-bodiedness/able-mindedness, as can attempts to "treat" children who are slightly shorter than average with growth hormones; in neither case are the people involved necessarily disabled, but they are certainly affected by cultural ideals of normalcy and ideal form and function.

=== Societal norms ===
In contexts where their differences are visible, persons with disabilities often face stigma. People frequently react to disabled presence with fear, pity, patronization, intrusive gazes, revulsion, or disregard. These reactions can, and often do, exclude persons with disabilities from accessing social spaces along with the benefits and resources these spaces provide. Disabled writer/researcher Jenny Morris describes how stigma functions to marginalize persons with disabilities:

Going out in public so often takes courage. How many of us find that we can't dredge up the strength to do it day after day, week after week, year after year, a lifetime of rejection and revulsion? It is not only physical limitations that restrict us to our homes and those whom we know. It is the knowledge that each entry into the public world will be dominated by stares, by condescension, by pity, and by hostility.

Additionally, facing stigma can cause harm to the psycho-emotional well-being of the person being stigmatized. One of the ways in which the psycho-emotional health of persons with disabilities is adversely affected is through the internalization of the oppression they experience, which can lead to feeling that they are weak, crazy, worthless or any number of other negative attributes that may be associated with their conditions. Internalization of oppression damages the self-esteem of the person affected and shapes their behaviors in ways that are compliant with dominance of those with no acknowledged disability. Ableist ideas are frequently internalized when disabled people are pressured by the people and institutions around them to hide and downplay their disabled difference, or "pass". The media play a significant role in creating and reinforcing stigma associated with disability. Media portrayals of disability usually cast disabled presence as necessarily marginal within society at large. These portrayals simultaneously reflect and influence the popular perception of disabled difference. According to writer Simi Linton, the act of passing takes a deep emotional toll by causing disabled individuals to experience loss of community, anxiety and self-doubt.

==== Tropes ====
There are distinct tactics that the media frequently employ in representing disability. These common ways of framing disability are heavily criticized for being dehumanizing and failing to place importance on the perspectives of persons with disabilities. As outlined by disability theorist and rhetorician Jay Timothy Dolmage, ableist media tropes can reflect and continue to perpetuate societal myths about disabled people.

===== Inspiration porn =====
Inspiration porn refers to portrayals of persons with disabilities in which they are presented as being inspiring simply because the person has a disability. These portrayals are criticized because they are created with the intent of making viewers with no acknowledged disability feel better about themselves in comparison to the individual portrayed. Rather than recognizing the humanity of persons with disabilities, inspiration porn turns them into objects of inspiration for an audience composed of those with no acknowledged disability.

===== Supercrip =====
The supercrip trope refers to instances when the media reports on or portray a disabled person who has made a noteworthy achievement but centers on their disability rather than what they actually did. They are portrayed as awe-inspiring for being exceptional compared to others with the same or similar conditions. This trope is widely used in reporting on disabled athletes as well as in portrayals of autistic savants. These representations, notes disability scholar Ria Cheyne, "are widely assumed to be inherently regressive", reducing people to their condition rather than viewing them as full people. Furthermore, supercrip portrayals are criticized for creating the unrealistic expectation that disability should be accompanied by some type of special talent, genius, or insight.

Examples of this trope in the media include Dr. Shaun Murphy from The Good Doctor, Marvel's Daredevil, and others. Scholar Sami Schalk argues that the term supercrip has a narrow definition given how widely used the term is. As a result, Schlak provides three categories of supercrip narratives used:

1. The regular supercrip narrative in which a disabled person gains regulation for completing mundane tacts. This is commonly seen as a disabled person being able to accomplish something despite their disability.
2. The glorified supercrip narrative in which a disabled person is praised for succeeding at something even a non-disabled person would not be able to do. This narrative form is commonly used to talk about disabled Paralympic athletes.
3. The superpowered supercrip narrative which appears in functionalized representations of disabled characters. Characters of this narrative type gain superpowers due to their disability. Common examples of this narrative form in action are prosthetics limbs that make one more powerful than expected or have futuristic technology that makes one a cyborg.

===== Disabled villain =====
Characters in fiction that bear physical or mental markers of difference from perceived societal norms are frequently positioned as villains within a text. Lindsey Row-Heyveld shares ways students should be taught to begin to further analyze this issue. Disabled people's visible differences from the able-bodied majority are meant to evoke fear in audiences that can perpetuate the mindset of disabled people being a threat to individual or public interests and well-being.

===== Disability drop =====
The "disability drop" trope is when a supposedly disabled character is revealed to have been faking, embellishing, or otherwise not actually embodying their claimed disability. Jay Dolmage offers Kevin Spacey's character, Verbal Kint, in the film Usual Suspects as an example of this, and depictions like this can reflect able-bodied society's mistrust of disabled people. In addition, this reveal of a character's nondisabledness often serves as the narrative climax of a story, and the use of disability as a source of conflict in the plot, narrative obstacle, or a device of characterization aligns with other disability studies scholars' theory of "Narrative Prosthesis," a term coined by David T. Mitchell and Sharon Snyder.

===== Disabled victim =====
Another frequent occurrence is when someone with a disability is assumed to be miserable or helpless. The Hunchback of Notre Dame's Quasimodo, The Elephant Man's John Merrick, A Christmas Carol's Tiny Tim, and even news broadcasts that refer to people as "victims" or "sufferers" are a few examples of this stereotype.

===== Eternally innocent =====
Characters with disabilities are frequently portrayed in movies as being angelic or childish. These films include Rain Man (1988), Forrest Gump (1994) and I Am Sam (2001). The innocent and endearing person with a disability often points out the inadequacies of their "normal" adult peers, which helps them achieve salvation. Like all the others, this stereotype perpetuates patronizing perceptions that are simply untrue and are therefore damaging. While there are many disability tropes, disability aesthetics attempts to dispel them by accurately depicting disabled bodies in art and media.

==== Self-advocacy ====
Some disabled people have attempted to resist marginalization through the use of the social model in opposition to the medical model; with the aim of shifting criticism away from their bodies and impairments and towards the social institutions that oppress them relative to their able-bodied peers. Disability activism that demands many grievances be addressed, such as lack of accessibility, poor representation in media, general disrespect, and lack of recognition, originates from a social model framework. The creation of "disability culture" stemmed from the shared experience of stigmatization in broader society. Embracing disability as a positive identity by becoming involved in disabled communities and participating in disability culture can be an effective way to combat internalized prejudice; and can challenge dominant narratives about disability.

==== Intersections ====
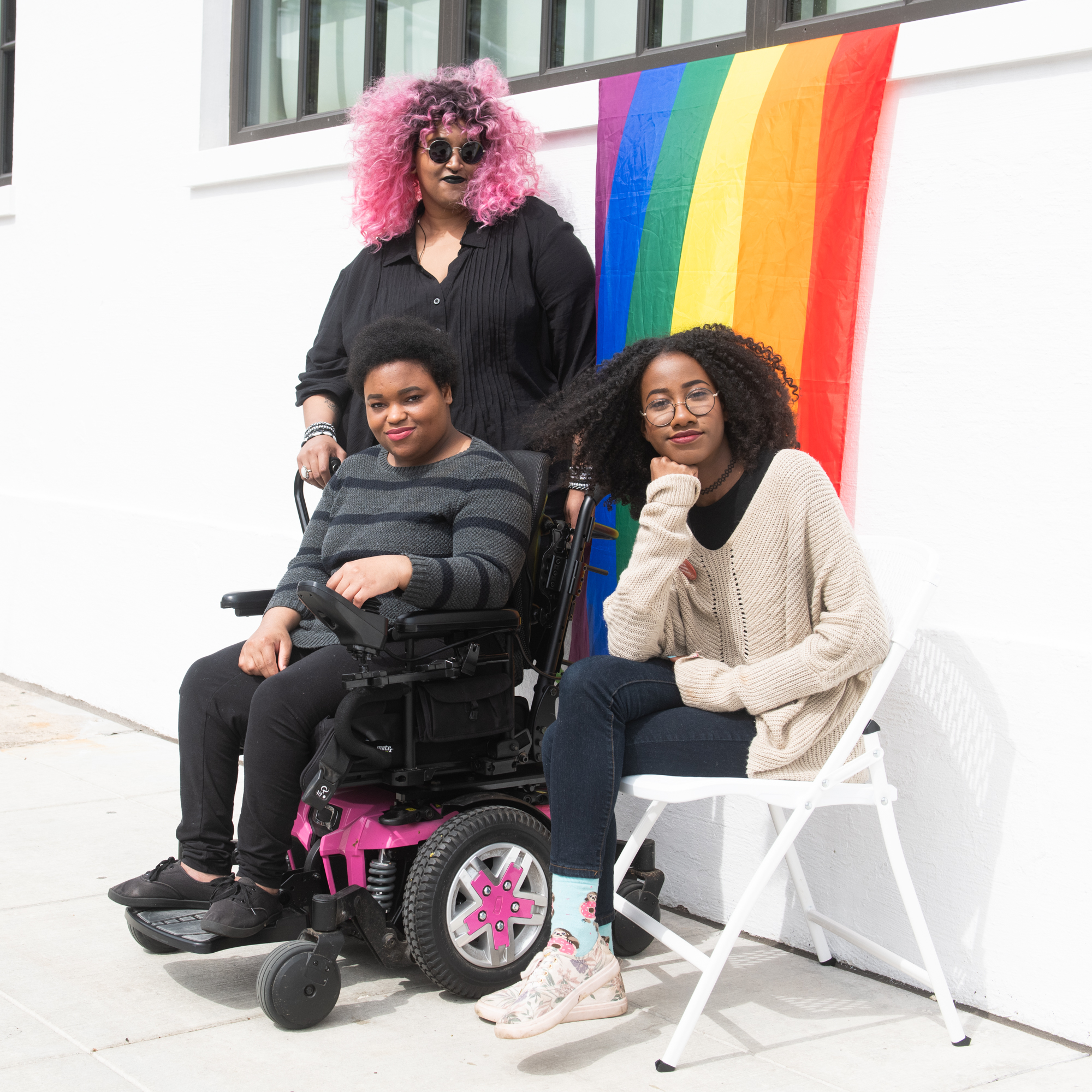
Three Black and disabled people in front of a pride flag

The experiences that disabled people have to navigate social institutions vary greatly as a function of what other social categories they may belong to. For example, a disabled man and a disabled woman experience disability differently. This speaks to the concept of intersectionality, which explains that different aspects of a person's identity (such as their gender, race, sexuality, religion, or social class) intersect and create unique experiences of oppression and privilege. Many intersections exist. Disability is defined differently by each person; it may be visible or invisible, and multiple intersections often arise from overlapping identity categories. The United Nations Convention on the Rights of Persons with Disabilities differentiates between a few kinds of disability intersections, such as the age-disability, race-disability, and gender-disability intersection.

===== Race =====
Incidence of disability is reported to be greater among several minority communities across the globe, according to a systematic analysis of the Global Burden of Disease Study. Disabled people who are also racial minorities generally have less access to support and are more vulnerable to violent discrimination. A study in the journal Child Development indicated that minority disabled children are more likely to receive punitive discipline in low and middle income countries. Due to the fact that children with disabilities are mistreated more often than those without disability; racialized children in this category are at an even higher risk. With respect to disability in the United States, Camille A. Nelson, writing for the Berkeley Journal of Criminal Law, notes the dual discrimination that racial minorities with disabilities experience from the criminal justice system, expressing that for "people who are negatively racialized, that is people who are perceived as being non-white, and for whom mental illness is either known or assumed, interaction with police is precarious and potentially dangerous."

===== Gender =====
The marginalization of people with disabilities can leave disabled people persons unable to actualize what society expects of gendered existence. This lack of recognition for their gender identity can leave persons with disabilities with feelings of inadequacy. Thomas J. Gerschick of Illinois State University describes why this denial of gendered identity occurs:

Bodies operate socially as canvases on which gender is displayed and kinesthetically as the mechanisms by which it is physically enacted. Thus, the bodies of people with disabilities make them vulnerable to being denied recognition as women and men.

To the extent that women and men with disabilities are gendered, the interactions of these two identities lead to different experiences. Women with disabilities face a sort of "double stigmatization" in which their membership to both of these marginalized categories simultaneously exacerbates the negative stereotypes associated with each as they are ascribed to them. According to the framework of intersectionality, gender and disability intersect to create a unique experience that is not simply the coincidence of being a woman and having a disability separately, but the unique experience of being a woman with a disability. It follows that the more marginalized groups one belongs to, their experience of privilege or oppression changes: in short, a black woman and a white woman will experience disability differently.

According to The UN Woman Watch, "persistence of certain cultural, legal and institutional barriers makes women and girls with disabilities the victims of two-fold discrimination: as women and as persons with disabilities." As Rosemarie Garland-Thomson puts it, "Women with disabilities, even more intensely than women in general, have been cast in the collective cultural imagination as inferior, lacking, excessive, incapable, unfit, and useless."

===== Socio-economic background =====
Similar to the intersections of race and disability or gender and disability, a person's socio-economic background will also change their experience of disability. A disabled person with a low socio-economic status will experience the world differently, with more obstacles and fewer opportunities, than a disabled person with a high socio-economic status. A good example of the intersection between disability and socio-economic status is access to education, as we know that there are direct links between poverty and disability, often working in a vicious cycle. The costs of special education and caring for a disabled child are higher than for a child with no acknowledged disability, which poses an immense barrier in accessing appropriate education. The inaccessibility of appropriate education (at any stage), can lead to difficulties in finding employment, which often results in the vicious cycle of being 'bound' by one's experience as a poor and disabled person to remain in the same social structure and experience socio-economic exclusion. In short, this vicious cycle exacerbates the lack of economic, social, and cultural capital for disabled people with a low socio-economic background. On the other hand, a disabled person of a high socio-economic status, may have an easier time accessing appropriate (special) education or treatment - for example by having access to better aids, resources, or programmes that can help them succeed.

== Disability culture ==
=== Sport ===
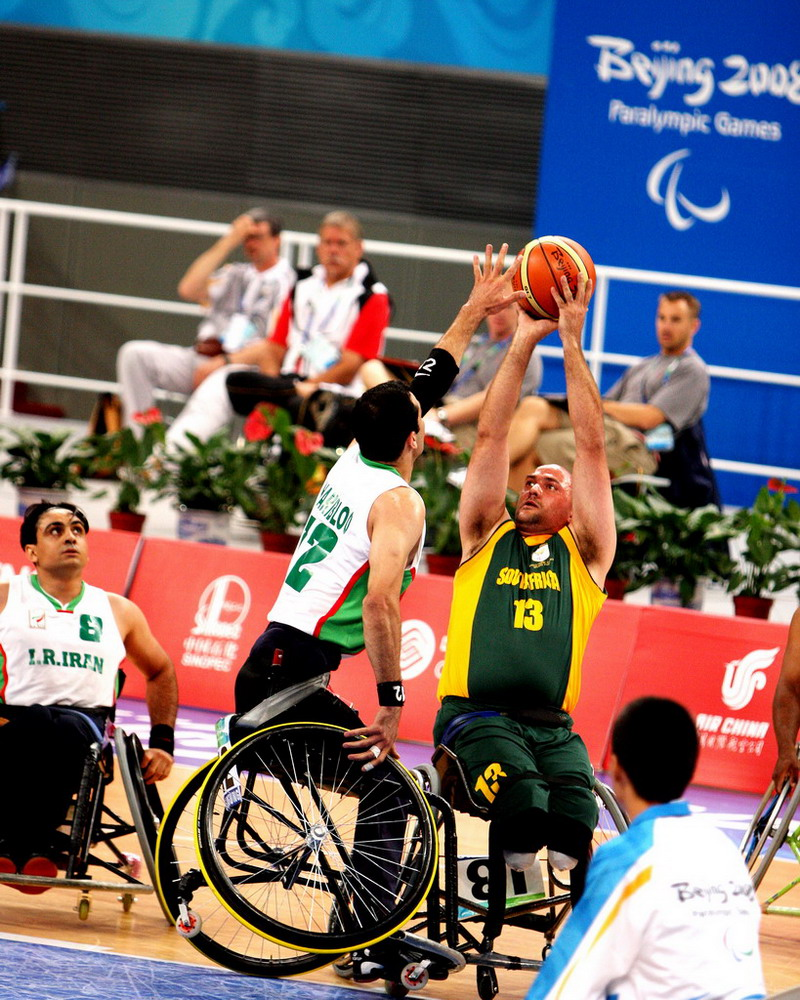
Wheelchair basketball match between South Africa and Iran at the 2008 Summer Paralympics

The Paralympic Games (meaning "alongside the Olympics") are held after the (Summer and Winter) Olympic Games. The Paralympic Games include athletes with a wide range of physical disabilities. In member countries, organizations exist to organize competition in the Paralympic sports on levels ranging from recreational to elite (for example, Disabled Sports USA and BlazeSports America in the United States). The Paralympics developed from a rehabilitation program for British war veterans with spinal injuries. In 1948, Sir Ludwig Guttman, a neurologist working with World War II veterans with spinal injuries at Stoke Mandeville Hospital in Aylesbury in the UK, began using sport as part of the rehabilitation programs of his patients. In 2006, the Extremity Games were formed for physically disabled people, specifically limb loss or limb difference, to be able to compete in extreme sports.

== Demographics ==
Estimates of worldwide and country-wide numbers of disabled people are problematic. The varying approaches taken to defining disability notwithstanding, demographers agree that the world population of individuals with disabilities is very large. For example, in 2012, the World Health Organization estimated a world population of 6.5 billion people. Of those, nearly 650 million people, or 10%, were estimated to be moderately or severely disabled. In 2018 the International Labour Organization estimated that about a billion people, one-seventh of the world population, had disabilities, 80% of them in developing countries, and 80% of working age. Excluding disabled people from the workforce was reckoned to cost up to 7% of gross domestic product.

=== United States ===
According to the Centers for Disease Control's Morbidity and Mortality weekly report, one-fourth of people in the United States are reported to be disabled as of 2016. 10% of young adults were reported to have mental disabilities. The rates of mobility-related issues were highest among middle-aged people and elderly people, with 18.1% and 26.9%, respectively. In terms of race or ethnicity, Asians have the lowest reported rate of disability at around 10%, while Native Americans, the ethnic group with the highest reported incidence, are reported to have a disability rate at an estimated 30% of adults. African Americans had a higher reported disability rate of 25%, compared to 16% for white adults and 17% for Hispanic people.

=== Canada ===
22.3% of Canadians over 15 are reported to have a disability, or 6,246,640 people, according to the 2017 Canadian Survey on Disability Reports. In Canada, women and older people are more likely to be disabled than working-class men. In comparison to working-age persons between 25 and 65, seniors over 65 reported a disability rate of 38%, which is nearly twice as high. In Canada, women over 15 had a reported disability rate of 24.3%, compared to men's 20%. According to reports from the 2017 Canadian Survey of Disability, South Asians over the age of 15 in Canada had the greatest proportion of disability at 4%, while Latin Americans had a lower rate at 1%.

=== Australia ===
Nearly one in five Australians, or 4.4 million people, were estimated by the Australian Bureau of Statistics to have a disability. A mental or behavioral issue was reported in over 25% of Australians with disabilities. Male prevalence was 17.6 million, while female prevalence was somewhat higher at 17.8 million between the sexes. Age-wise, 11.6% of adults between 0 and 64 in Australia had a disability, compared to 49.6% of seniors 65 and over. 53.4% of Australians aged 15 to 64 who have a disability are employed.

=== United Kingdom ===
According to the House of Commons Library, 14.6 million, or 22%, of the population in the UK, were reported to be disabled in 2020–2021. In the UK, there were 9% of children, 21% of working-age people, and 42% of persons over the state pension age who were disabled or impaired. Approximately 29% of White individuals, 27% of mixed-race people, 22% of Asian people, 21% of Black people, and 19% of people from other ethnic groups were reported as having impairments or disabilities, according to the Life Opportunities Survey, which surveyed 35,875 people in 2011. When compared to men, women are a little more likely than men to have a disability, with 31% of women reportedly having one as opposed to 26% of men, according to results of another survey taken the same year.

=== China ===
According to Twenty-Year Trends in the Prevalence of Disability in China, a medical publication from the National Library of Medicine, there were an estimated 84.6 million Chinese individuals living with a disability in 2006. In a 2006 poll of 83,342 men and 78,137 women, the age groups with the highest reported rates of disability are 18–44-year-old males (22.5%) and 65–74-year-old females (22.8%), according to polls published in the journal that were representative of the country as a whole. In China, the percentage of people with disabilities varies substantially between urban and rural regions, with men and women having reported rates of 72.4% and 72.2%, respectively, in rural China, compared to reported rates of 27.6% and 27.8%, respectively, in urban China. Hearing and speech disabilities are the most commonly reported in China, with men being more affected than women at rates 39.6% and 36.2% among disabled people, respectively.

=== South Korea ===
In South Korea, there were accounted to be 2.517 million people with disabilities in total, or roughly 5.0% of the population, in 2018. When compared to Koreans without disabilities, people with disabilities spent an average of 56.5 days in medical facilities, which was 2.6 more than the national average. 34.9% of the entire workforce was employed in jobs connected to disabilities. Families with disabilities made an average income of 41.53 million won, or 71.3% of total family earnings. According to the Korean 2020 Statistics on the Disabled The majority of persons with disabilities needed help with "cleaning" and "using transportation", among other everyday tasks.

=== Developing nations ===
Disability is more common in developing than in developed nations. The connection between disability and poverty is thought to be part of a "vicious cycle" in which these constructs are mutually reinforcing.

== See also ==
- Accessibility
- Assistive technology
- Curb cut effect
- Disability Studies
- Epistemic injustice
- Medical–industrial complex
- Neurodiversity
- Timeline of disability rights in the United States
- Timeline of disability rights outside the United States
