= David Diamond =

David Diamond may refer to:

- David Diamond (composer) (1915–2005), American composer
- David Diamond (journalist)
- David Diamond (screenwriter) (born 1965), American screenwriter
- David Diamond (theatre), theatre artistic director
- David Diamond, frontman and songwriter with Canadian band The Kings
- David Diamond, guitarist/keyboardist for the band Berlin
- David M. Diamond, neuroscientist
- David Diamond (producer) (1901–1979), American film producer
