= Handicap =

Handicapped or handicap may refer to:

== In sports and games ==
- Handicapping, various methods of levelling the outcome in a competitive sport or game:
  - Handicap race (disambiguation)
  - Handicap (chess)
  - Handicap (Go)
  - Handicap (golf)
  - Handicap (sailing)
  - Handicap (shogi)
  - Handicap (xiangqi)
- Handicapping, various methods of outcome prediction or levelling outcome predictions:
  - Asian handicap, bookmakers' technique to level odds
  - Political handicapping, the news process of trying to predict election outcomes, especially rather than focusing on the political issues
- "The Handicapped", short story by Larry Niven originally published in 1967 as "Handicap"

== Human condition ==
- Disability, an impairment that substantially affects a person's life activities, and may be present at birth or arise later in life
- Self-handicapping, a psychological method for preserving self-esteem

== Biology ==
- Handicap principle, an evolutionary theory (also known as handicap theory)
