= Child vehicular heat stroke deaths =

Children left in hot cars

Children left in cars can die of heat stroke; when it is the result of a caregiver inadvertently leaving them in the car, it is often called in the press forgotten baby syndrome or fatal distraction. Incidents have occurred in multiple countries. Laws have been passed to help prevent such incidents in Italy and Israel.

== Background ==
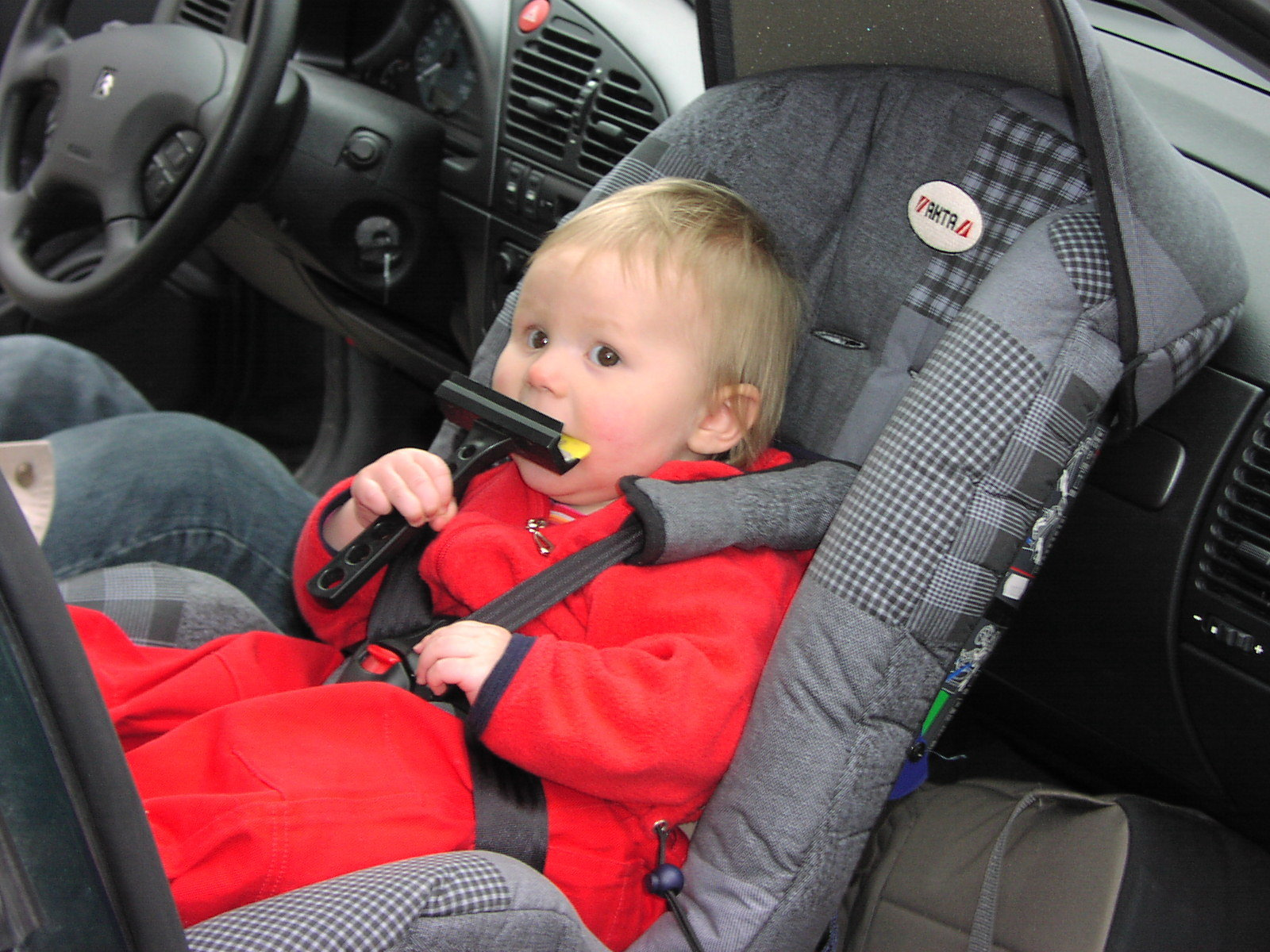
Child in a rear-facing car seat in the front passenger seat, beside the driver

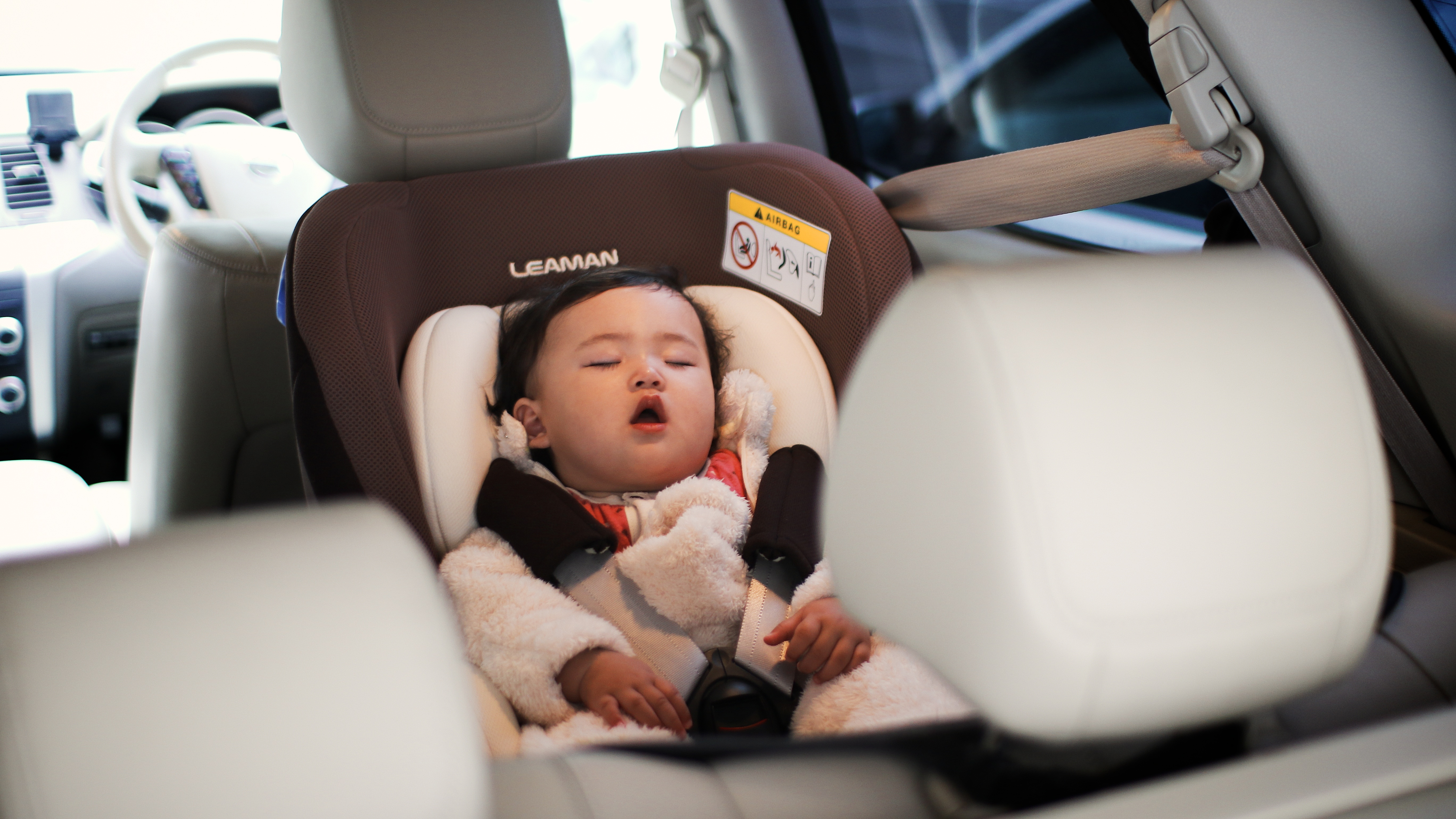
Child asleep in a rear-facing car seat behind the driver's seat, likely not visible to the driver

Until the 1970s, child passenger safety was not a focus of legislation or a concern for manufacturers in the US. In the 1980s, states began to develop child-safety laws. In the 1990s, the Academy of Pediatrics and the National Highway Institute created child-passenger safety guidelines which included requiring children under a certain age or weight be in a car seat. Most car seats for babies were rear-facing seats that could be strapped into the front passenger seat, which meant a parent or caregiver was constantly aware of the child's presence in the seat. In the mid-1990s, concerns developed about the safety of rear-facing car seats when airbags deployed, and the recommendations changed to placing all car seats into the back seat. For rear-facing car seats in particular, this meant that a parent would see the same thing -- the back of a car seat -- from the driver's seat, whether that car seat had a child in it or not.

According to Erika Breitfeld, writing in the Berkeley Journal of Criminal Law, "Amplifying the problem, children frequently fall asleep during car rides...Not surprisingly, more than half of the children who die from vehicular heatstroke are under the age of two and in rear-facing car seats." Breitfeld's 2020 analysis concluded that "more children died from hyperthermia than ever died due to front-seat airbags" and that there was a direct correlation between the recommendations to place rear-facing child seats into back seats and children being inadvertently left in cars.

== Causes ==
Each year, around the world, dozens of children die of vehicle-related hyperthermia. Because these numbers began to rise after the popularization of air bags and rear-facing child safety seats, researchers began to suspect that memory may be the culprit. According to Consumer Reports, inadvertently leaving a child in a car could happen to any parent or caregiver.

According to David M. Diamond, a psychology professor at the University of South Florida who has been studying the phenomenon since 2004, the phenomenon is a consequence of tension between the brain's habit-memory and prospective-memory systems, which is resolved when basal ganglia "habit memory" suppresses the "prospective memory" system of the hippocampus and the prefrontal cortex, resulting in a false memory and what he calls "autopilot". Other psychologists have suggested the phenomenon is functionally similar to forgetting keys in a car or forgetting to send a letter.

Diamond has identified "stress, sleep deprivation, and change in routine" as common causes. Almost inevitably a child requiring a rear-facing child seat represents a change in routine for its caregivers. It also almost inevitably represents stress and sleep deprivation for the same reasons. Stephen Cowen, a psychology professor at the University of Arizona, has said that stress can render a person "more attentive to the immediate sensory stimuli or threats in your environment but not as attentive to your more distant memory of leaving your children in the car".

== Public reactions ==
According to Safe Kids Worldwide, nearly 1 in 4 parents admit to having forgotten their child, age three or younger, was in the car. According to Diamond, over 25% of parents with children under 3 have lost awareness of the child being present in the car at some point during a drive; however many people believe they themselves could not forget a child in the car with them.

Typical reactions from those hearing about such incidents are condemnation of the parent or caregiver, suspicion of their motives, and a belief that a competent and loving parent or caregiver could never forget they had a child in the car with them. Ed Hickling, a clinical psychologist, theorizes that people want to believe bad things do not happen to good people, and that the universe or that a just God would not allow such horrific things to happen. According to Breitfeld, "we have a visceral response to blame someone".

== Prevention efforts ==
In 2019 Italy required all child car seats be equipped with an alarm. In 2021 Israel enacted laws requiring such safety systems be installed in cars. No such laws have been implemented in other countries.

There are multiple products available that can help solve the problem through technology, including alarms that go off if a back door was opened before starting the car and is not opened again after the car is turned off, car-seat alarms (which detect whether a child is buckled in), and end-of-trip reminders. Research suggests people will not buy and use such products because they do not believe they could make such a mistake themselves.

There is a bracelet called WeeMind, designed to make drivers remember that there is a child with them in the car.

In 2001, General Motors announced that by 2004, all models would be equipped with sensors, but by 2020 that had not happened. In 2019, the Association of Global Automakers and the Alliance of Automobile Manufacturers committed to the standardization of rear-seat-occupant alert systems by 2025.

In the United States, the Infrastructure Investment and Jobs Act included a mandate for action by the Department of Transportation to propose rules. The National Highway Traffic Safety Administration estimated rules would be proposed in April 2025.

== Incidence ==
A study of Brazilian incidents examining 31 cases (including 21 fatalities) from 2006 to 2015 found that 71% of cases involved a parent inadvertently leaving a child in a car. A study of Italian incidents found 8 vehicular-related hyperthermia deaths between 1998 and 2017. A study of Indian cases found 40 fatalities from 2011 to 2020. A study of Canadian incidents found one death per year, with most being a result of children being inadvertently left in the car. Between 2008 and 2016, 23 children died in Israel of heat stroke in cars. Between 2007 and 2009, there were 7 child deaths from heatstroke in France and Belgium. In Australia as of 2023 there were an average of two incidents yearly.

In the United States, around 38 children die annually after being left in vehicles. In 2018, 52 children died of hyperthermia in cars in the United States. In 2024, 40 children died in the US. In the US, more than half of the deaths are due to caregivers inadvertently leaving the child in the car, and around a quarter happen when a child gets into a car without the caregiver's knowledge. The remainder occur when a child is intentionally left in a car due to caregiver neglect or ignorance.

Children are also rescued from cars, but the data is less clear in such instances. According to Kidsafe WA, approximately 5,000 children are rescued every year from cars in Australia. According to the UK Automobile Association in 2016, they are called to get children out of cars an average of 7 times every day.

== Notable cases ==
- Death of Cooper Harris

== See also ==
- Father (2025), a film about a father forgetting his child in the car
