= Hand-in-cap =

Old English trading procedure that inspired the word handicap

Hand-in-cap is an old English trading procedure that gave rise to the modern word handicap. It was used to fairly trade items of potentially unequal value. Here's how the procedure works:

1. Appoint an umpire: An umpire is assigned who will evaluate the items being traded.
2. Place forfeit money: The players and the umpire each put a small amount of forfeit money into a cap. This serves two purposes:
  - It incentivizes the umpire to make a fair evaluation because the umpire can only collect the forfeit if certain conditions are met.
  - It discourages players from being overly stubborn, as they risk losing their forfeit money if they don't reach an agreement.
3. Offer up an item: Each player offers an item the other might want.
4. Evaluate the items: The umpire evaluates whether they are of equal value, and if not, estimates the value difference. The player who brought forth the less valuable item has to bring in the monetary difference in this case.
5. Make the decision: Both players put their hands into the cap. And then they remove their hands at the same time:
  - An open hand signals agreement with the umpire's valuation.
  - A closed hand signals disagreement.
6. Determine the outcome:
  - Both agree: The item trade occurs, and the umpire collects the forfeit money.
  - Both disagree: No trade occurs, but the umpire still collects the forfeit money.
  - One agrees, one disagrees: No trade occurs. The player who agreed with the valuation collects the forfeit money.

== History ==
This game was played in Piers Plowman, a poem from the 14th century. The concept of a neutral person evening up the odds was extended to handicap racing in the mid-18th century. In handicap racing, horses carry different weights based on the umpire's estimation of what would make them run equally. The use of the term to describe a person with a disability—by extension from handicap racing, a person carrying a heavier burden than normal—appeared in the early 20th century.
