= Laura Hershey =

American poet (1962–2010)

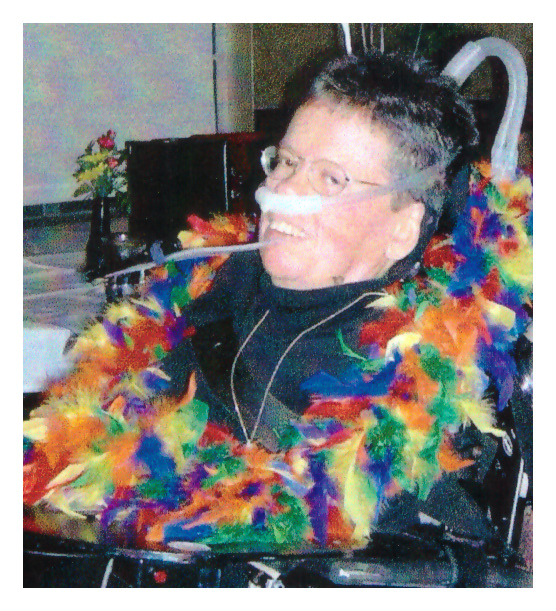
Poet and activist Laura Hershey

Laura Ann Hershey (August 11, 1962 – November 26, 2010) was a poet, journalist, popular speaker, feminist, and a disability rights activist and consultant. Known to have parked her wheelchair in front of buses, Hershey was one of the leaders of a protest against the paternalistic attitudes and images of people with disabilities inherent to Jerry Lewis's MDA Telethon. She was a regular columnist for the Christopher and Dana Reeve Foundation, and on her own website, Crip Commentary, and was published in a variety of magazines and websites. She was admired for her wit, her ability to structure strong arguments in the service of justice, and her spirited refusal to let social responses to her spinal muscular atrophy define the parameters of her life as anything less than a full human existence. She was also the mother of an adopted daughter.

== Education ==
Hershey earned a BA in history in 1983 from Colorado College, where a number of classes had to be relocated so she could attend them because some of their buildings were not accessible. On her graduation, she received a Watson Fellowship, which allowed her to travel and write and led to her involvement in the global disability rights movement. She went on to get an MFA in creative writing from Antioch University Los Angeles.

== Activism ==
"She was an intelligent, funny, active writer, activist and mother," said Robin Stephens, Hershey's partner. "She was a genius who lived with disability and lived well." Hershey wrote many books of poems, magazines, and online at a number of websites. Her works center on the battle to preserve individual dignity in a world slanted to see the debilitated as invaluable or useless. Her poem "You Get Proud By Practicing" is one of her most famous works. Hershey was famous for protesting the muscular dystrophy telethons of Jerry Lewis, which enticed the view that people with muscular dystrophy were not worth living. During a protest of the telethon in 2001, she was cited for trespassing. In an excerpt that embodies her work, Hershey further cautions people with disabilities against being constrained to feel thankful for necessities.

Hershey likewise offered workshops, discourses, readings, and different introductions to an extensive variety of associations. Some recent appearances include a workshop session on queer disabled bodies at the 2009 Creating Change conference. She was also a keynote speaker and read her poetry at the annual meeting of the Association on Higher Education and Disability (AHEAD) and facilitated a two-day meeting between disability and labor activists. She is well known for her activism and promotion for a large number of social justice issues and disability rights. Hershey has also served on a few committees related to policy on health care, guided organizations on community outreach for people with disabilities, and participated in grassroots activism with groups such as ADAPT, Not Dead Yet, and the Colorado Cross-Disability Coalition. Hershey additionally co-founded Domestic Violence Initiative for Women with Disabilities. She has also led or taken part in campaigns to confront the negative imagery from the Jerry Lewis Telethon, to advance Medicaid home and community-based services, to dismiss Social Security work disincentives, to raise awareness of LGBTQ individuals with disabilities, to advance the rights of home care specialists, and more. The Presidents on Committee on Employment of People with Disabilities and acknowledged her activism and presented the 1998 President's Award to Hershey.

She twice attended United Nations conferences on women's rights, one in Nairobi, Kenya, and one in Beijing, China. Her activism included campaigns to remove Social Security work disincentives, to challenge the negative images of the Jerry Lewis MDA Telethon, to increase visibility of LGBTQ people with disabilities, to improve Medicaid home and community-based services, and to promote the rights of home care workers. She was active in many committees, and organizations ADAPT, Not Dead Yet, and the Colorado Cross-Disability Coalition, among others.

== Writing ==
=== Books ===
- Survival Strategies for Going Abroad: A Guide for People with Disabilities (Mobility International USA, 2005)

=== Columns ===
- 1993 From Poster Child to Protester
- Aug 25, 2010 Independence and Interdependence: Equally Important Values, Huffington Post
- Nov 24, 2010 The Good and Bad of Gratitude

=== Poetry ===
- "Welcome", "Honor", "The Prostitutes of Nairobi", in On the Lawn: Poems from the Nairobi Women's Conference (chapbook, 1987)
- "In the Way", "Petunias", "You Get Proud By Practicing", in In the Way: ADAPT Poems (chapbook, 1991)
  - "You Get Proud By Practicing" was also published as a poster illustrated by Dan Wilkins
- "Reading to the Cooks", "Note from Oregon", "August", in Dreams of a Different Woman (chapbook, 1992)
- "Belly of the Bus", "Flights", "Culture Shock, Crip-Style", in Flights: Poems from the Beijing Women's Conference (chapbook, 1995)
- "Adopting a Fourteen-Year-Old in the 21st Century" (2010)
- Spark Before Dark, a collection of poems (Finishing Line Press)

Other of her poems appear in:

- Fire in the Soul: 100 Poems for Human Rights
- Bigger Than the Sky: Disabled Women on Parenting
- Pushing the Limits: Disabled Dykes Produce Culture

=== Other ===
She contributed the chapter "Rights, Realities, and Issues of Women with Disabilities" to the 2003 anthology Sisterhood Is Forever: The Women's Anthology for a New Millennium, edited by Robin Morgan.

== Awards ==
- Honorary doctorate from Colorado College
- 1998 President's Award from the President's Committee on Employment of People with Disabilities
- 2010 Lambda Poetry Fellowship
- 2016 Colorado Women's Hall of Fame

== Legacy ==
The Laura Hershey Memorial Disability Benefits Support Program was created in 2011 by the Colorado State Legislature to "provide education, direct assistance and advocacy for people with disabilities eligible for Social Security Disability Insurance, Supplemental Security Income and Long-Term Medicaid".

== Personal life ==
Born in Colorado, Hershey used a manual wheelchair and later a power chair, and was a poster child for Jerry Lewis's Muscular Dystrophy Association when young. She grew up to protest the MDA's telethons, arguing they projected an image of people with muscular dystrophy as pitiful people whose lives are not worth living.

Hershey and her partner of 20 years, Robin Stephens, had adopted a daughter. Hershey died November 26, 2010, after a short illness.
