= David M. Diamond =

American neuroscientist

David M. Diamond is a neuroscientist and professor at the University of South Florida.

== Research ==
Diamond has researched the neurological conditions that lead parents to forget their children in hot cars, a phenomenon commonly termed forgotten baby syndrome. He has also been quoted as an expert regarding the tendency for travelers to forget their belongings, and more generally for people under stress to become more forgetful.

He has explored with Kevin Kip the methodology for the selection of therapies for posttraumatic stress disorder in United States Department of Veterans Affairs and United States Department of Defense facilities.

== Education and career ==
Diamond graduated from the University of California, Irvine in 1980 and completed a PhD in biology at University of California, Irvine in 1985. After postdoctoral research at the UC Irvine Center for the Neurobiology of Learning and Memory, he joined the University of Colorado Health Sciences Center as an assistant professor in 1986. He moved to the University of South Florida in 1997, and has been the director of the university's Center for Preclinical and Clinical Research on PTSD since 2007.

== Selected publications ==
- Diamond, David M.; Bennett, M. Catherine; Fleshner, Monika; Rose, Gregory M. (October 1992), "Inverted-U relationship between the level of peripheral corticosterone and the magnitude of hippocampal primed burst potentiation", Hippocampus, 2 (4): 421–430, doi:10.1002/hipo.450020409, PMID 1308198, S2CID 8882728
- Morgan, Dave; Diamond, David M.; Gottschall, Paul E.; Ugen, Kenneth E.; Dickey, Chad; Hardy, John; Duff, Karen; Jantzen, Paul; DiCarlo, Giovanni; Wilcock, Donna; Connor, Karen; Hatcher, Jaime; Hope, Caroline; Gordon, Marcia; Arendash, Gary W. (December 2000), "Aβ peptide vaccination prevents memory loss in an animal model of Alzheimer's disease", Nature, 408 (6815): 982–985, Bibcode:2000Natur.408..982M, doi:10.1038/35050116, PMID 11140686, S2CID 4428449
- Kim, Jeansok J.; Diamond, David M. (June 2002), "The stressed hippocampus, synaptic plasticity and lost memories", Nature Reviews Neuroscience, 3 (6): 453–462, doi:10.1038/nrn849, PMID 12042880, S2CID 19013402
