= Voice Finger =

Software tool for mouse control through speech recognition

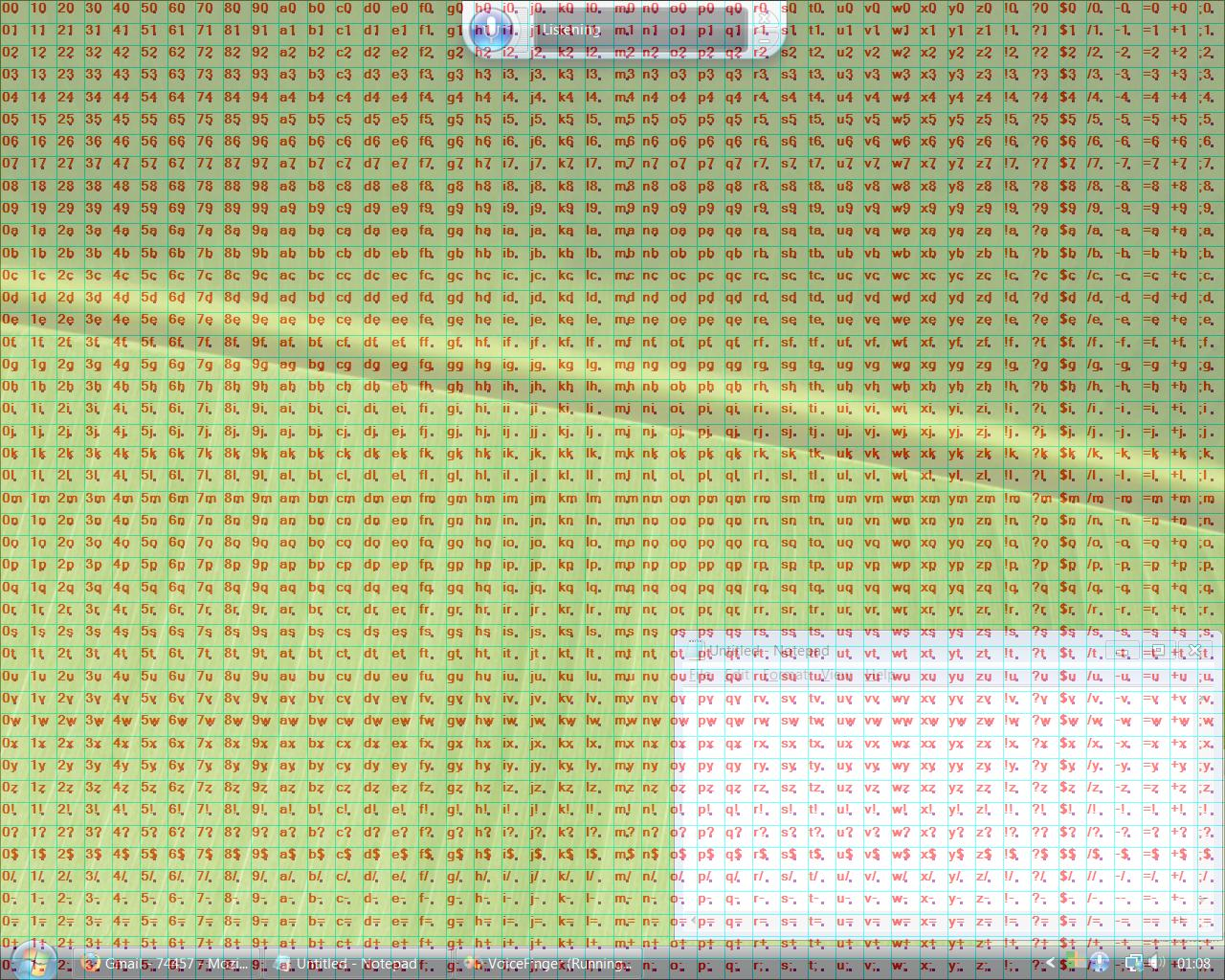
Voice Finger mouse coordinates when clicking

Voice Finger is a software tool that enables users to control the mouse cursor and keyboard through speech recognition. Voice Finger improves on the default Windows Speech Recognition tools by reducing the number or length of voice commands required to carry out various tasks.

Voice Finger uses an expandable grid to click anywhere on the screen, most of the time with just one command. As the main focus of the software is people with disabilities and computer injuries, it has more features than usual in mouse and keyboard control, and leaves dictation to be handled by Windows built-in speech recognition.
