= David Diamond (theatre) =

Canadian theatre director

David Diamond is a founding member of the Vancouver based theatre company Theatre for Living (formerly known as Headlines Theatre). He is the originator of Theatre for Living techniques. He was Artistic Director of the theatre company from 1984 until 2018 when, with the support of the board of directors and Staff he decided to 'devolve' the organization. Diamond continues to offer Theatre for Living workshop processes on many issues with communities who invite him to do so and also offers training workshops in Theatre for Living techniques. He is also a keynote speaker, author and actor.

Diamond was Visiting Theatre Director at the Faculty of Medicine and Dentistry at the University of Alberta from 2015 to 2020, using Theatre for Living to help shift the culture of the learning environment, as well as Visiting Faculty of the Master of Arts Program in Peace, Development, Security and International Conflict Transformation at the UNESCO Chair for Peace Studies, University of Innsbruck, Austria since 2013.

Diamond is the author of Theatre for Living: the art and science of community-based dialogue, which has a foreword by renowned systems theorist Fritjof Capra, and was honored with the American Alliance of Theatre and Education 2008 Distinguished Book Award. In 2012 the book was published in German by Ibidem under the title Theater zum Leben and is also available in Spanish, under the title "Teatro para la Vida" published by Caligrama.

== Life and work ==
Diamond grew up in Winnipeg, Manitoba and received his BFA in acting from the University of Alberta in 1975, and immediately began working as an actor in professional theatre, radio, TV and film. He moved to Vancouver in 1976.

Diamond, along with documentary film maker Nettie Wild, was a founding member of the Vancouver Artists' Alliance. It was through this organization that he was introduced to the first members of Headlines Theatre. Headlines Theatre began by making agitprop theatre, starting with their first production Buy, Buy Vancouver in 1981, inspired by the rental housing crisis that was just starting in Vancouver.

Diamond is credited with writing many of the non-Forum Theatre works produced by Headlines Theatre over the years including The Enemy Within (1986), No’ Xya (Our Footprints) (1987), Mamu (with Kevin Finnan) (1994). and Thirsty (with Kathryn Ricketts) (2002). Also, The Dying Game (1998), which was Forum Theatre.

Diamond's theatrical practice, and the direction of Headlines' work, shifted after he was introduced to Theatre of the Oppressed (TO) by Brazilian Theatre artist Augusto Boal at TO skills sharing workshop in Paris in 1984. After producing The Enemy Within (1986) Diamond began to move the company's community work away from its roots making agitprop work in favor of what he calls a Power Play structure. Power Plays are created by invitation, deep 'in community' and utilize the tools of TO practice to build a play over a 6-day workshop. After exploring TO techniques and the creation of Power Plays for many years in the late 80s/early 90s, Diamond began to redefine the language of his work, as a response to requests to do so from communities with which he was working, creating what is now defined as Theatre for Living.

Diamond is also credited with directing almost all of the theatre company's mainstage projects, having developed a creation process that involves a week long "power play" followed by three to four weeks of creation and rehearsals with a cast and professional production team.

Diamond created Theatre for Living (TfL) through a merging of Augusto Boal's Theatre of the Oppressed, his own theatre experience and his lifelong interest in systems theory. "Theatre for Living approaches the community as a living organism and recognizes... when plays are created, they are made to help us investigate ways to change the behaviors that create the structure, not only the structure itself." He also facilitates TfL workshops around the world and pioneered the development of live, interactive Forum television and web casting.

In 2010, Diamond traveled with the Governor General of Canada Michaëlle Jean as a Canadian Delegate in Africa.

As of 2022, he has directed over 600 community-specific projects on issues such as racism, civic engagement, Indigenous land claims, violence, addiction, street youth, inter-generational conflict, homelessness, climate change, corporate messaging, reclaiming hope from a culture of fear, and reconciliation between Indigenous and non-Indigenous populations in Canada, to name just some.

Since 'devolving' the theatre company in 2018, he continues to offer Theatre for Living training workshops and to respond to project and speaking requests from around the world, as well as offering mentoring to interested individuals.

== Awards ==
Diamond is the recipient of numerous awards, including an Honorary Doctorate from the University of the Fraser Valley in 2001, the City of Vancouver's Cultural Harmony Award, the Jessie Richardson Award for Innovation in Theatre, an Honorary Doctorate from the University of the Fraser Valley and the Otto René Castillo Award for Political Theatre.

In September 2012, Diamond received the Vancouver 2012 Mayor's Arts Award for Community Engaged Art.
