= Handicap race =

Handicap race may refer to:

- Handicap (horse racing), a race in which horses carry different weights
- Handicap (greyhound racing), a race in which greyhounds start from different starting traps
- Bracket racing, in drag racing, where cars, motorcycles, or trucks start at different times based on vehicle category.
- Handicap (sailing), handicaps for sailing vessels in races
- Handicap (speedway), the Match Average calculated for every motorcycle speedway rider

== See also ==
- Handicapping, the various methods of leveling the outcome in a competitive sport or game
- Para athletics, track racing as practiced by people with disabilities
