= Jay Timothy Dolmage =

Canadian academic

Jay Timothy Dolmage is a Canadian academic in the fields of rhetoric, composition, disability studies, and critical pedagogy. As of 2025, he is the Chair of English at the University of Waterloo. He is also the founding editor of Canadian Journal of Disability Studies.

Dolmage grew up in Gravenhurst, Ontario and participated in the local Disability Rights Movement with disabled family members. He received a Bachelor of Arts in English from the University of British Columbia, a Master of Arts in creative writing from the University of Windsor, and a Doctor of Philosophy from Miami University.

Dolmage has a partner and three children.

== Books ==
- Disability Rhetoric. Syracuse University Press. 2014. ISBN 978-0-815-63445-4.
- Academic Ableism: Disability and Higher Education. University of Michigan Press. 2017. ISBN 978-0-47-205371-1.
- Disabled Upon Arrival: Eugenics, Immigration, and the Construction of Race and Disability. Ohio State University Press. 2018. ISBN 978-08142-1362-9.
