= LOMAK =

Assistive technology device

Lomak keyboards being used with a head-pointer and a hand-pointer

LOMAK is an acronym for Light Operated Mouse And Keyboard. It is an assistive technology device designed for use by people who cannot use a standard computer keyboard and mouse. The Lomak is clipped to an adjustable stand placed vertically underneath the computer screen and is operated by a small laser pointer mounted on a hat or headband. Some people who have arm movement can alternatively use the Lomak horizontally with a hand-pointer. It can be used as an additional keyboard and mouse with any desktop or laptop computer which has a spare USB port. Like many computer peripherals for people with special access needs, it is very expensive, about $1500.

== Description ==
The Lomak keyboard is a USB 1.0 device which plugs into a computer's USB port. It does not require installation of any software. When used in mouse mode, it can move the computer's mouse cursor at fast or slow speeds as selected by the user, and generate left or right clicks on command. When used in keyboard mode, it can generate any of the characters created by a standard keyboard, including Shift, Ctrl, and Alt combinations.

The keyboard has three circles of keys each surrounding a central Confirm sensor, with setup and control keys in a horizontal bar below. Each key comprises a light sensor and an associated LED indicator which turns on when the key is active. Each change of key is optionally accompanied by an audible click. Characters are selected and sent to the computer when confirmed.

The head-pointer contains a laser and operates from an internal battery for about eight hours between charges. It turns off when pointed away from the keyboard and left stationary for a time. It has an internal switch which awakes the device when it is moved.

== Notesai overlay ==
The Lomak can be set to operate with the Notesai overlay, which fastens to the top surface of the keyboard. This overlay assigns two characters to every second sensor on the central circle. Each pair of characters comprises a high-use primary character (such as 'A') and a lesser-used secondary character (such as 'B'). The effect is to double the angular space between the characters, with the lesser-used characters being selected by a shift operation.

The Notesai arrangement permits people with limited head control (such as those with cerebral palsy and similar conditions) to select characters more easily than with the closely spaced Lomak layout. The choice of layout (Lomak or Notesai) is a user-configurable option.

== Internationalization ==
In order to generate language-specific characters and accent marks, the Lomak can be user-configured to emulate keyboards used in several countries. The keys on keyboards for international users have icon graphics in place of text. The international characters are selected by a shift procedure. The Lomak currently can emulate keyboards used in the following locales:

- Belgian French
- Danish
- French
- German
- Norwegian
- Spanish
- Swedish/Finnish
- US/UK (the standard setting, which can be used in many English-speaking countries)
- US International (this setting can generate characters for most European languages)

== History ==
The keyboard had its origins in 1987 when Aucklander Mike Watling saw the limited options available for young disabled people to communicate with their teachers. In 2001 Watling, an electrician, took time out to study for a Diploma in Applied Science at the Auckland University of Technology, who provided the support to produce early prototypes prior to commercial development and launch in 2005. Final development of the keyboard firmware and quality assurance measures for manufacturing were undertaken by Industrial Research Limited.

The Lomak keyboard was awarded gold in the International Design Excellence Awards of 2007.

A Lomak keyboard is on permanent display at New York's Museum of Modern Art.
