= Supported decision making =

Decision making model for people with mental or intellectual disabilities

Supported decision-making is the idea that people with learning impairments and other significant impairments should make decisions about their own lives with the support of a team of people. Supported decision-making is an alternative to the guardianship model, where someone makes decisions for a person. Supported decision-making aims to promote self-determination and independence.

== Legal status ==
=== United Nations ===
One of the principles of the UN Convention on the Rights of Persons with Disabilities is "Respect for inherent dignity, individual autonomy including the freedom to make one’s own choices, and independence of persons." Article 12 goes into more detail about the rights of people to make their own financial decisions. Some countries that have signed the CRPD still have laws that allow guardianships. Advocates in some countries are working to change the law, including suing the government based on failure to follow the CRPD.

=== Canada ===
In addition to Canada being a signatory of the UN Convention on the Rights of Persons with Disabilities, several Canadian provinces have laws about supported decision-making. For example, British Columbia uses representative agreements, where people with disabilities name a person or group of people they trust, and those people help them make decisions. In very rare cases, the trusted person, known as a representative, is able to make decisions for the person. Yukon and Saskatchewan also have representative agreements.

=== Sweden ===
Sweden does not have a guardianship system. In Sweden, a person with a disability must ask the court for a supporter. The court appoints a legal mentor or administrator. A legal mentor can be a friend, family member, or professional supporter and helps the person make decisions. The legal mentor gives advice and can only make decisions if the person is ill. A person with a disability can cancel the arrangement at any time. The court can appoint an administrator with greater financial powers and can make decisions without the person's approval, but this does not mean that all decision-making rights are lost. A person with a disability can still vote.

=== United Kingdom ===
In England and Wales, the Mental Capacity Act of 2005 establishes both supported decision-making and guardianship as legal concepts. The act requires that supported decision-making must be tried before any guardianship arrangement. The law also establishes that no action can take away a person's right to vote, marry, have friends and relationships and place a child up for adoption.

=== United States ===
In the United States, eighteen states have comprehensive laws about supported decision-making: Alabama, Alaska, Arizona, California, Colorado, Delaware, Illinois, Indiana, Louisiana, Maryland, Nevada, New Hampshire, New York, North Dakota, Rhode Island, Texas, Washington, and Wisconsin, as well as the District of Columbia, Other states may not have laws specifically about supported decision-making, but may have laws that require alternatives to guardianship whenever possible. Some states, such as Arkansas, have narrower laws addressing supported decision-making in specific contexts, such as in decisions related to organ transplants.

The Autistic Self Advocacy Network, Arc of the United States, the American Civil Liberties Union (ACLU), and the National Disability Rights Network advocate supported decision-making as an alternative to guardianship. The position of the Autistic Self Advocacy Network is that guardianships deprive people of the right to make choices, of self-determination, and bodily autonomy; people under guardianship are not allowed to make their own decisions about where to live, how to spend their money, and what medical care they receive. Supported decision-making is endorsed by the U.S. Administration for Community Living.

In 2013, Jenny Hatch, a woman with Down syndrome, living in Newport News, Virginia, won the right to make her own decisions using supported decision-making. Hatch was previously under guardianship, where she says she was forced to live in a group home, had her cell phone and laptop taken, and was cut off from her friends. The case was decided in favor of Hatch. With support, she decided to move in with her friends.
