= Berkeley Journal of Criminal Law =

- Discipline: Criminal law
- Language: English
- Edited by: Ben Wise; Caitlin Andersen; Navdeep Bal

Publication details
- Former names: Boalt Journal of Criminal Law; California Criminal Law Review
- History: 2000–present
- Frequency: Biannual

Standard abbreviations
- Bluebook: Berkeley J. Crim. L.
- ISO 4: Berkeley J. Crim. Law

Indexing
- ISSN: 1934-9629

The Berkeley Journal of Criminal Law is a law journal published at the University of California, Berkeley School of Law. It was established in 2000 as the California Criminal Law Review. It was renamed Boalt Journal of Criminal Law in 2004, eventually acquiring the current name in 2006. The journal publishes work concerning emerging issues of both substantive and procedural criminal law, as well as "articles that discuss issues unique to California and other western states." The journal publishes a Fall Edition in January and a Spring Edition in June every year and is completely digital. The journal is ranked as the 6th criminal law and procedure journal in the Washington and Lee University School of Law's journal ranking list.
