= Keah Brown =

American disability rights activist

- Born: September 19, 1991 (age 35)
- Occupations: Disability rights activist, author, and journalist
- Known for: #DisabledAndCute
- Notable work: The Pretty One, Sam's Super Seats, The Secret Summer Promise

Keah Brown (born September 19, 1991) is an American disability rights activist, author, journalist, and writer. She is also known as the creator of the hashtag #DisabledAndCute, which first went viral in February 2017 and caught the attention of such celebrities as Sophia Bush and Brie Larson. She has also published a number of books, including her memoir The Pretty One: On Life, Pop Culture, Disability, and Other Reasons to Fall in Love, with Me.

== Publicity ==
=== #DisabledAndCute (campaign) ===
Brown "was already an accomplished freelance journalist and writer" when, on February 12, 2017, she created the hashtag #DisabledAndCute in a Twitter post that included "cute" photos of herself, a disabled black woman. Brown then invited other members of disabled communities to do the same in an act of self-love against the notion that being disabled and being cute (i.e. attractive) are mutually exclusive. #DisabledAndCute went viral within days, catching the attention of celebrities such as Sophia Bush and Brie Larson. With steadily rising popularity as a result, Brown went on to acquire an agent and book deal, which lead to the publishing in August 2019 of her first book, The Pretty One: On Life, Pop Culture, Disability, and Other Reasons to Fall in Love, with Me.

=== Media appearances ===
Brown was featured on 3rd Hour of Today on November 7, 2019, when she was interviewed by Sheinelle Jones and Dylan Dreyer. Earlier in 2019, the New York Times also named Brown as having been chosen by Brie Larson, the lead role in Captain Marvel, to profile Larson for the international magazine, Marie Claire. Handpicking Brown was part of Larsen's "[vow] to seek out more underrepresented journalists." In September 2016, Amy Poehler's Smart Girls profiled Brown in the article titled "Meet Smart Girl Keah Brown: Brilliant writer and disability activist."

== Literary work ==
=== Magazines ===
Brown's work has appeared in a number of literary magazines, such as Wildness, an online bimonthly that Poets & Writers Magazine has called one of "Nine New Lit Mags You Need to Read." Poets & Writers reviews Wildness: "Launched in December 2015, Wildness features formally inventive work by both established and emerging writers that embraces the mysteries of the self and the outside world. Issue Five, Tranquility, features new poetry from Cynthia Arrieu-King and Christopher Citro, fiction from Renee Bibby and Wyl Villacres, an essay by Keah Brown, and more."

Brown's writings have covered a range of genres and subjects, from fiction and nonfiction, blogging, interviews, and essays to pieces pertaining to movies and TV, beauty and fashion, sports, and other popular culture, as well as to body positivity and her relationship to body image as a black woman having grown up with cerebral palsy. She has written for Cosmopolitan, Teen Vogue, Harper's Bazaar, Refinery29, and Bustle, among others, as well as online women's organizations and under-represented communities' media outlets, such as Essence, Disability Visibility Project, DIVERSEability, Amy Poehler's Smart Girls, Bitch Magazine, The Establishment, and Gay Mag (a partnership between Roxane Gay and Medium).

Brown contributed an essay for the literary magazine Catapult called "Love, Disability, and Movies," on how "my black disabled body is not the body reflected on screen," in the romantic comedies and dramas to which she relates.

=== Books ===
==== The Pretty One ====
Brown's first book, The Pretty One: On Life, Pop Culture, Disability, and Other Reasons to Fall in Love, with Me, published by Atria Publishing Group, is a collection of personal essays/stories in which she relates to popular culture, beauty and body image, romantic love, and physical pain as a black woman with both cerebral palsy (a physical disability) and invisible disabilities. Brown also writes about her relationship with her non-disabled identical twin.

==== Sam's Super Seats ====
Brown's picture book debut Sam's Super Seats was published in 2020, being illustrated by Sharee Miller. The book follows Sam, a young girl with cerebral palsy who goes back-to-school shopping with her best friends.

==== The Secret Summer Promise ====
Keah's next book, a young adult novel titled The Secret Summer Promise, was published June 6, 2023 via Levine Querido. It follows Andrea, a teen girl with cerebral palsy who struggles with a crush on her female best friend.

== Activism ==
As a disabled black woman and activist, Brown has been known as a critic of the entertainment industry. In June 2016, Brown wrote the article, "Season Four of 'Orange Is the New Black' Has a Race Problem," which would be cited later in the peer-reviewed Canadian Review of American Studies, in 2017.

In September 2016, Amy Poehler's Smart Girls did an interview with Brown that reflected some of Brown's other writings when she said she wanted "to see more women of color with disabilities, specifically black women" acting in lead roles on film and TV.

In 2018, following the death of Stephen Hawking, Brown was one of multiple activists who "took to social media to protest the portrayal of Hawking in death as 'freeing,' and a meme of him standing, having walked away from his wheelchair, looking up at the stars." Brown had stated that that kind of representation signified "to other disabled people that we should be excited for the opportunity to be 'free' of our bodies, but it also reduces Stephen Hawking, one of the greatest intellectuals ever, to his disability and nothing more."

Brown also questioned in 2018 the entertainment industry's use of remakes, tweeting: "Instead of rebooting shows, why not try letting black and brown people share our ideas for brand new shows where we exist?"

Bitch Magazine has described Brown as "on a mission to change how disabled people are perceived in pop culture, in fashion, and in our everyday lives."

== Personal life ==
Brown is bisexual.

== Publications ==
=== Books ===
- The Pretty One: On Life, Pop Culture, Disability, and Other Reasons to Fall in Love with Me. Atria Publishing Group / Simon and Schuster. August 6, 2019. ISBN 978-1982100544.
- Sam's Super Seats. Illustrated by Sharee Miller. Kokila. August 23, 2022. ISBN 978-0593323892.
- The Secret Summer Promise. Levine Querido. June 6, 2023. ISBN 978-1646141739.

=== Anthology Contributions ===
- Nijkamp, Marieke, ed. (September 18, 2018). "Mother Nature's Youngest Daughter". Unbroken: 13 Stories Starring Disabled Teens. Farrar, Straus and Giroux. ISBN 978-0-374-30650-2.
- Bethany C., Morrow, ed. (October 1, 2019). "I Am The Revolution: A Poem". Take the Mic: Fictional Stories of Everyday Resistance. Arthur A. Levine Books. ISBN 978-1338343724.
- Wong, Alice, ed. (June 30, 2020). "Nurturing Black Disabled Joy". Disability Visibility: First-Person Stories from the Twenty-First Century. Vintage Books / Knopf Doubleday Publishing Group. ISBN 978-1-984-89942-2.

== See also ==
- Imani Barbarin

== Sources ==
- Andrews, Erin E. (December 2019). Disability as diversity : developing cultural competence. New York, NY: Oxford University Press. ISBN 978-0-19-065231-9. OCLC 1112281713.
- Brown, Keah (2019). The pretty one: on life, pop culture, disability, and other reasons to fall in love with me. Simon and Schuster. ISBN 978-1-9821-0054-4. OCLC 1056742657.
