= A Face for Picasso =

2021 memoir by Ariel Henley

- Author: Ariel Henley
- Genre: Memoir
- Publisher: Farrar, Straus and Giroux
- Publication date: November 2, 2021
- Pages: 400
- Award: Golden Kite Award - Nonfiction Text for Older Readers
- ISBN: 978-0-374-31407-1

A Face for Picasso: Coming of Age with Crouzon Syndrome is a 2021 memoir by Ariel Henley, covering her life with Crouzon syndrome.

== Background ==
Both Ariel Henley and her twin sister Zan were born with Crouzon syndrome, a genetic disorder affecting the shape of their skull and requiring them to undergo multiple surgeries starting at a very young age, as well as causing them to have various disabilities, including a visible difference.

The book's title comes from an article that compared the features of Crouzon syndrome to the artstyle of Pablo Picasso. It covers topics such as beauty standards, ableism, fatphobia, and the life of Picasso.

== Reception ==
The book was reviewed by School Library Journal, Publishers Weekly, and Kirkus Reviews. Kirkus Reviews noted how the episodic sequences in the book were connected together by themes of Picasso's work and cubism, while Publishers Weekly described the book as a "compelling meditation on identity as well as a much-needed challenge to an ableist system".

Michelle Quirk, a writer with Moebius syndrome for Psychology Today, highlighted Henley's decision to aim the book at young adults, citing it as a particularly difficult time for people with visible differences from her research and her own experiences, and hoped the book would lead to discussions around the concepts of beauty and face equality.

=== Accolades ===
| Year | Award/Honor | Result | Ref. |
|---|---|---|---|
| 2022 | Schneider Family Book Award | Honored | |
| 2022 | Golden Kite Award - Nonfiction Text for Older Readers | Won | |
| 2023 | YALSA Award for Excellence in Nonfiction | Shortlisted | |

== See also ==
- Disability Visibility: First-Person Stories from the Twenty-First Century - essay collection that Henley wrote in
