= Ellen Samuels =

US disability scholar

- Occupations: Professor, Academic, Poet, Writer, Activist

Academic background
- Education: Oberlin College (BA); Cornell University (MFA); University of California, Berkeley (PhD)

Academic work
- Discipline: Gender studies, Disability studies, LGBT studies, English
- Sub-discipline: Feminist theory, queer theory, body theory, 19th-21st century American literature, creative writing, African American studies
- Institutions: University of Wisconsin, Madison

Ellen Samuels is a gender studies professor, disability studies scholar, academic, poet, and writer. She won two LAMDA Literary Awards the anthology Out of the Ordinary: Essays on Growing Up with Gay, Lesbian, and Transgender Parents.

== Career ==
Samuels worked as a Professor of Gender & Women's Studies and a Professor of English at University of Wisconsin, Madison. Some of her courses included "Gender, Women, and Cultural Representation," "The Cultural Politics of Illness," "Feminist Disability Studies," and "The Body in 19th-Century American Literature."

While at the University of Wisconsin, Samuels founded the UW Disability Studies Initiative. She was also the director of the UW Madison Open House Gender Learning Community.

=== Writing ===
In 2000, Samuels and Noelle Howey edited the anthology Out of the Ordinary. They won the 2001 Lambda Literary Awards for Children's and Young Adult Literature and Anthology.

In 2011, Samuels won the Catharine Stimpson Prize for Outstanding Feminist Scholarship for her article "Examining Millie and Christine McKoy: Where Enslavement and Enfreakment Meet."

Samuels published her first book in disability studies, Fantasies of Identification: Disability, Gender, Race, in 2014.

In a review for MELUS, Sarah E. Chinn wrote "Ellen Samuels’s masterful first book, Fantasies of Identification: Disability, Gender, Race , begins its analytical journey in 1845, which is, in her telling, a signal year in US literature, culture, and history. ... Samuels’s purpose is to show the deep and inextricable links between and among these events, and how histories of white supremacy, medical professionalization, and the rise to dominance of the coercive ideological power of normativity intersect and cross-pollinate from the middle of the nineteenth century to the beginning of the twenty-first century."

Nevena Stojanovic, for the Canadian Journal of Disability Studies, wrote "Samuels’s incisive argumentation in “Fantasies of Measurement” illuminates cultural methods for determining degrees of disability in the twentieth and twenty-first centuries."

Sarah E. Chinn in an article in Transformations: The Journal of Inclusive Scholarship and Pedagogy wrote that "Ellen Samuels is part of the second generation of disability studies academics, a generation that has inherited these insights and built upon them. Trained in the field by established scholars, Samuels claims an intersectional analysis of disability, sexuality, race, gender, and class as foundational to her work."

In 2021, Samuels wrote Hypermobilities, a memoir written via haiku. It is about her experience with EDS treatment.

Also in 2021, Samuels co-edited the Crip Temporalities issue of South Atlantic Quarterly. Samuels and co-editor Elizabeth Freeman also wrote the introduction to the issue.

Samuels has also had her work featured in Alice Wong's anthologies Disability Visibility: First-Person Stories from the Twenty-First Century (2020) and Disability Intimacy: Essays on Love, Care, and Desire (2024), The Disability Studies Reader (vol. 4, 2013), Disability Media Studies (2017), and more.

Samuels was not informed that her work would be in the 4th or 5th editions of the Disability Studies Reader nor offered consent for it to be included. She had met the editor, Lennard J. Davis, while doing her PhD at University of California, Berkeley. She said in an interview with The Chronicle that "It’s a fine line between someone using their privilege to uplift the voices of those who have not had an institutional footing“ and taking advantage of or profiting off of their voices.”

In 2025, Samuels published Your Body Should Be a Part of the World. The book won the C&R Press Winter Soup Bowl Chapbook Award of 2024.

Alice Wong wrote that "The poems in Your Body Should Be a Part of the World by Ellen Samuels brilliantly capture the lived experience of being sick and disabled. Bodies are unruly, confounding, and inscrutable. Samuels invites us into her bodyworld sharing its infinite intimacies with us." Leah Lakshmi Piepzna-Samarasinha added that “Ellen Samuels’s Your Body Should Be a Part of the World is serious business, the poetic hospital we crips (and everyone else) need right now. Arriving right on time as fascists attempt to push us right out of the world, these delicious, finely wrought poems are the wry, contemplative, complex reflection of crip realities we need and deserve, insisting on our presence and our right to be everywhere we are.”

She is currently writing 3 books respectively titled Sick Time: What Chronic Life Tells Us, Double Meanings: Conjoined Twins at the Millennium, and Body of Mine: A Memoir in Genetic Sequence.

== Personal Life ==
Samuels has Classic Ehlers-Danlos Syndrome.

Samuels has a Bachelor of Arts from Oberlin College where she majored in English and Women’s Studies. She then went on to complete a Master of Fine Arts in Creative Writing at Cornell University and a PhD in English at University of California, Berkeley. Samuels was awarded the Ed Roberts Postdoctoral Fellowship in Disability Studies.

She is currently based in Madison, Wisconsin.

== Bibliography ==
=== Books ===
- Out of the Ordinary: Essays on Growing Up with Gay, Lesbian, and Transgender Parents. Howey, Noelle; Samuels, Ellen, eds. 2000.
- Fantasies of Identification: Disability, Gender, Race. 2014.
- Hypermobilities. 2021.
- Crip temporalities. South Atlantic Quarterly. Samuels, Ellen; Freeman, Elizabeth, eds. 2021.
- Your Body Should Be a Part of the World. 2025.

=== Selected Chapters ===
- "Even My Hair Won't Grow Straight". Lesbians, Levis and Lipstick: The Meaning of Beauty in Our Lives. 2012. pp. 103–105.
- "My body, my closet: Invisible disability and the limits of coming out". The Disability Studies Reader. Vol. 4. 2013. pp. 316–332.
- "Prosthetic Heroes: Curing Disabled Veterans in Iron Man 3 and Beyond". Disability Media Studies. 2017. pp. 129–151.
- "Passing". Keywords for Disability Studies. 2020. pp. 135–137.
- "Six Ways of Looking at Crip Time". Disability Visibility: First-Person Stories from the Twenty-First Century. Wong, Alice, ed. 2020. pp. 189–196.
- "Twenty-Seven Ways of Looking at Crip Autotheory". Crip Authorship: Disability as Method. Mills, Mara; Sanchez, Rebecca, eds. 2023. pp. 203–209.
- "Body Workers". Placing Disability: Personal Essays of Embodied Geography. 2024. pp. 149–152.
- "Poem: Elegy for a Mask Mandate". Disability Intimacy: Essays on Love, Care, and Desire. Wong, Alice, ed. 2024.

=== Selected Articles ===
- "Critical divides: Judith Butler's body theory and the question of disability". National Women's Studies Association Journal. 14 (3): 58–76. 2002.
- ""A Complication of Complaints": Untangling Disability, Race, and Gender in William and Ellen Craft's Running A Thousand Miles for Freedom". Melus. 31 (3): 15–47. 2006.
- "Examining Millie and Christine McKoy: Where Enslavement and Enfreakment Meet". Signs: Journal of Women in Culture and Society. 37 (1). 2011. doi:10.1086/660176.
- "Six Ways of Looking at Crip Time". Disability Studies Quarterly. 37 (3). 2017. doi:10.18061/dsq.v37i3.5824.
- "How Do Early Americans with Disabilities Act?". Early American Literature. 52 (1). 2017.
- "Passing, coming out, and other magical acts". Negotiating disability: Disclosure and higher education: 15–24. 2017.
- "Sick and Well Time". Brevity (65). 2020.
- “Slow Time, Slow Futurity,” in “Exploring Indisposability: The Entanglements of Crip Art,” Colloquium, Panorama: Journal of the Association of Historians of American Art. 8 (1). 2022. doi:10.24926/24716839.13275.
