= 13th Lambda Literary Awards =

2001 literary awards ceremony

The 13th Lambda Literary Awards were held in 2001 to honour works of LGBT literature published in 2000.

== Special awards ==
| Category | Winner |
|---|---|
| Pioneer Award | Astraea Foundation |

== Nominees and winners ==
| Category | Winner | Nominated |
|---|---|---|
| Anthologies/Fiction | David Bergman and Karl Woelz, eds., Men on Men 2000 | Michael Rowe, Queer Fear; Robert Drake and Terry Wolverton, Circa 2000: Lesbian Fiction at the Millennium; Ruth Vanita and Saleem Kidwai, Same Sex Love in India; Lawrence Schimel, Kosher Meat |
| Anthologies/Non-Fiction | Noelle Howey and Ellen Samuels, eds., Out of the Ordinary | Victoria Brownworth, Coming Out of Cancer; Jess Wells, Home Fronts; Dean Kostos, Mama's Boy; Amy Sonnie, Revolutionary Voices |
| Children's/Young Adult | Noelle Howey and Ellen Samuels, eds., Out of the Ordinary | Nancy Garden, Holly's Secret; Amy Sonnie, Revolutionary Voices; Benjie Nycum, The XY Survival Guide; Jean Ferris, Eight Seconds |
| Drama | John Cameron Mitchell and Stephen Trask, Hedwig and the Angry Inch | Paul Rudnick, The Most Fabulous Story Ever Told; Lisa Kron, Maureen Angelos, Dominique Dibbell, Peg Healey and Babs Davy, Five Lesbian Brothers; Tom Donaghy, The Beginning of August; Alina Troyano, I, Carmelita Tropicana |
| Gay Biography/Autobiography | Douglas Murray, Bosie: A Biography of Lord Alfred Douglas | Jean-Yves Tadié, Marcel Proust; David Mixner, Brave Journeys; Jay Quinn, The Mentor; Ned Rorem, Lies |
| Gay Fiction | K. M. Soehnlein, The World of Normal Boys | Christopher Bram, The Notorious Dr. August; Edmund White, The Married Man; Bernard Cooper, Guess Again; Erasmo Guerra, Between Dances |
| Gay Mystery | John Morgan Wilson, The Limits of Justice | Christopher Rice, A Density of Souls; Michael Craft, Name Games; Krandall Kraus, Love's Last Chance; Casey Nelson, Nothing Gold Can Stay |
| Gay Poetry | Carl Phillips, Pastoral | Thom Gunn, Boss Cupid; Michael Lassell and Elena Georgiou, The World in Us; Timothy Liu, Word of Mouth; David Trinidad, Plasticville |
| Gay Studies | James J. Berg and Chris Freeman, The Isherwood Century | Martin Duberman, Left Out: The Politics of Exclusion; John D'Emilio, William B. Turner and Urvashi Vaid, Creating Change; Samuel R. Delany, Shorter Views: Queer Thoughts and the Politics of the Paramilitary; Kerwin Kay, Male Lust |
| Humor | David Sedaris, Me Talk Pretty One Day | Michael Thomas Ford, It's Not Mean if It's True; Bruce Vilanch, Bruce!; Alison Bechdel, Post-Dykes to Watch Out For; Shar Rednour, The Femme's Guide to the Universe |
| Lesbian Biography/Autobiography | Judith Barrington, Lifesaving | Joan Schenkar, Truly Wilde; Amber Hollibaugh, My Dangerous Desires; June Jordan, Soldier: A Poet's Childhood; Carole Maso, The Room Lit by Roses |
| Lesbian Fiction | Michelle Tea, Valencia | Sarah Waters, Affinity; Stacey D'Erasmo, Tea; Jeanette Winterson, The Powerbook; Shay Youngblood, Black Girl in Paris |
| Lesbian Mystery | Jean Marcy, Mommy Deadest | Barbara Wilson, The Case of the Orphaned Bassoonists; Val McDermid, Booked for Murder; Therese Szymanski, When Evil Changes Face; Claire McNab, Death Understood |
| Lesbian Poetry | Elena Georgiou, Mercy Mercy Me | Robin Becker, The Horse Fair; Joy Harjo, A Map to the Next World; Nancy Boutilier, And on the Eighth Day Adam Slept Alone; Leslea Newman, Signs of Love |
| Lesbian Studies | Harmony Hammond, Lesbian Art in America | Esther Newton, Margaret Mead Made Me Gay; Diana McLellan, The Girls: Sappho Goes to Hollywood; Bonnie J. Morris, Girl Reed; Amber Hollibaugh, My Dangerous Desires |
| Science fiction, fantasy or horror | Jim Grimsley, Kirith Kirin | Michael Rowe, Queer Fear; Anne Rice, Merrick; Perry Brass, Angel Lust; David Gerrold, Jumping Off the Planet |
| Small press | Lauren Sanders, Kamikaze Lust; Erasmo Guerra, Between Dances | Douglas A. Martin, Outline of My Lover; Randy Boyd, Bridge Across the Ocean; Amy Schutzer, Undertow |
| Spirituality | Toby Johnson, Gay Spirituality; Krandall Kraus and Paul Borja, It's Never About What It's About | Mark Jordan, The Silence of Sodom; Gloria E. Anzaldúa, Interviews/Entrevistas; Catherine Lake, ReCreations |
| Transgender | David Ebershoff, The Danish Girl | John Colapinto, As Nature Made Him; Chris Bohjalian, Trans-Sister Radio; Noelle Hawley and Ellen Samuels, Out of the Ordinary; Karleen Pendleton Jiménez, Are You a Boy or a Girl? |
| Visual Arts | Keri Pickett, Faeries | Harmony Hammond, Lesbian Art in America; Don Bachardy, Stars in My Eyes; James Spada, Black and White Men; Greg Gorman, As I See It |
