= Face equality =

Social movement

Face equality is a social movement that seeks to normalize and de-stigmatize facial disfigurement (FD), and, by extent, lessen prejudice towards individuals with facial disfigurements. The term and corresponding movement was founded in 2008 by UK-based charity Changing Faces.

== Awareness dates ==
Face Equality Week, which Changing Faces also launched, is held annually in May. Themes for the week have included "Stop the Stare" (2022), and "We Will Not Hide" (2023). Face Equality Week was recognized by South Carolina In 2024.

The Sunshine Social Welfare Foundation in Taiwan also holds a Facial Equality Day in May.

== Goals ==
Goals of face equality include:

- Normalizing and de-stigmatizing FD, therefore lessening societal pressure to hide FD
- Addressing discrimination based on FD in employment and the workplace
- Addressing stereotypes that conflate FD with villainy
- Improving representation of individuals with FD in television and film
- Addressing and preventing the censorship of individuals with FD when posting photos and videos online
- Addressing how facial recognition technology has excluded people with FD

== Organizations ==
Face Equality International (FEI), founded in 2018 by James Partridge, is a coalition of "NGOs, charities, and support groups," which promote face equality. Groups which have joined FEI include Changing Faces (UK), the European Cleft Organisation, FACES (US), the Phoenix Society for Burn Survivors (US), the Smile Foundation (South Africa), and Smile Train.
