= AboutFace =

Canadian charity

AboutFace is a Canadian registered charity founded in 1985. AboutFace is the only Canadian charity dedicated to providing support and programs to individuals with facial disfiguration, and their families.

Since its creation, AboutFace has aided individuals with a facial disfigurement via a network of cleft, craniofacial and specialty teams and clinics. Following initial treatment, it offers an ongoing system of speakers, presenters and camps for youth, ages 10 to 18, who have a facial difference. The overall educational program was created by Paul Stanley, of the rock band Kiss, who was born with an ear deformity.

AboutFace has since gained chapters and is mentioned in US government resource lists.
