= The Girls: Sappho Goes to Hollywood =

2000 book by Diana McLellan

- Author: Diana McLellan
- Language: English
- Subject: Hollywood, Gay and Lesbian, Politics, Greta Garbo, Marlene Dietrich, Tallulah Bankhead
- Publisher: St. Martin's Press
- Publication date: October 2000
- Publication place: United States
- Media type: Hardcover
- Pages: 440
- ISBN: 978-0-312-24647-1
- Preceded by: Ear On Washington

The Girls: Sappho Goes To Hollywood is a 2000 book by Diana McLellan that speculates on a romance between Greta Garbo and Marlene Dietrich. The Observer found it "purely speculative" and "uncorroborated". Kirkus found it "lively". Publishers Weekly was more approving, saying McLellan was able to "bring a broader context and new sense of scholarship to the subject". The Houston Chronicle praised "exhaustive" research and found the book far from salacious.

It was nominated in the Lesbian Studies category for the 13th Lambda Literary Awards.

== Synopsis ==
Diana McLellan reveals the complex and intimate connections that roiled behind the public personae of Greta Garbo, Marlene Dietrich, Tallulah Bankhead, and the women who loved them. Private correspondence, long-secret FBI files, and troves of unpublished documents reveal a chain of lesbian affairs that moved from the theater world of New York City, through the heights of chic society, to embed itself in the power structure of the movie business. The Girls serves up a rich stew of film, politics, sexuality, psychology, and stardom.

— Via Goodreads

== Notable media mentions ==
- The Girls: Sappho Goes to Hollywood by Norah Vincent, The Baltimore Sun, September 24, 2000
- The Girls: Sappho Goes To Hollywood Publishers Weekly, October 2, 2000
- "Screen Sirens" by Dawn Trouard, The Washington Post, November 12, 2000
- "Secret Sirens: Fresh dirt on the lesbian amours of Garbo, Dietrich, and Hollywood's golden girls" by Michele Kort, The Advocate, December 5, 2000
- "Closet Hollywood" by David Freeman, The New York Times, January 7, 2001
- "Ladies who lie together..." by William Langley, The Telegraph, January 9, 2001
- "'I Want to Try Everything Once' / Tallulah Bankhead's bisexual braggadocio stands up to scrutiny" by Nancy Warren, The San Francisco Chronicle / SF Gate, January 26, 2001
- "Marlene, she's making eyes at me" by Gaby Wood, The Guardian, April 7, 2001
- "New in Paperback" by The Washington Post, October 7, 2001
- "Wild Girls" by Molly Haskell, The Guardian, January 8, 2004
