= The Secret Summer Promise =

2023 novel by Keah Brown

- Author: Keah Brown
- Audio read by: Tamika Katon-Donegal
- Genre: Young adult; Romance; LGBTQ
- Publisher: Levine Querido
- Publication date: June 6, 2023
- Pages: 336
- ISBN: 978-1646141739

The Secret Summer Promise is a 2023 young adult romance novel by Keah Brown. It follows Andrea, a teen girl with cerebral palsy who deals with feelings for both her female best friend and a new crush. The book is Brown's first young adult novel.

== Plot ==
While embarking on a list of summer plans, seventeen-year-old Andrea "Drea" Williams, who is Black and has cerebral palsy, realizes she is bisexual and that her feelings for her best friend Hailee are romantic. Desperate to rid herself of the crush, both out of fear of wrecking their friendship and her own internalized ableism, Andrea starts hanging out with George, a boy who develops his own crush on her, only to strain her relationship with Hailee further.

== Reception ==
Kirkus Reviews, while critical of the dialogue which they described as "often stilted and unnatural," expressed appreciation of the portrayal of Andrea's relationship with Hailee and the rest of their friend group and how Andrea's race, disability, and sexuality were not portrayed as hindrances but rather as important parts of her identity. They closed the review by saying "for fans of messy queer romance, some realistically complicated representation." A separate review on Kirkus Reviews of the audiobook adaption narrated by Tamika Katon-Donegal described Katon-Donegal's performance as "a lot of fun" and "a great summer listen," though they argued it could be difficult to tell the different characters apart at times. Publishers Weekly wrote "lighthearted romance that's sure to gratify and meaningful conversations surrounding friendship and first love drive this earnest treat from Brown."

Allison Staley of School Library Journal gave a more mixed review, arguing that the characters behaved immaturely for their age, likening them to tweens, and criticizing the reliance on miscommunication between characters; however, Staley positively commented on the depiction of Andrea's disability and the romance between her and Hailee, concluding that "young teens who want a lighthearted, queer, friends-to-lovers summer romp filled with authentic representation will find plenty to love in this debut." Booklist compared the book to works by Camryn Garrett and Becky Albertalli, with the reviewer also commenting on the deconstruction of the love triangle trope and the diversity among the cast.
