= Disability Visibility: First-Person Stories from the Twenty-First Century =

2020 essay collection edited by Alice Wong

- Editor: Alice Wong
- Audio read by: Alejandra Ospina, Alice Wong
- Language: English
- Subject: Disability
- Genre: Non-fiction anthology
- Publisher: Vintage Books / Knopf Doubleday Publishing Group
- Publication date: June 30, 2020
- Pages: 336
- ISBN: 978-1-984-89942-2

Disability Visibility: First-Person Stories from the Twenty-First Century is a 2020 anthology edited and curated by American disability justice advocate and MacArthur Fellow Alice Wong. The anthology was based on Wong's Disability Visibility Project (DVP), an online community and oral history centered on promoting and amplifying disabled stories, media and culture. The anthology is a collection of essays by a variety of disabled authors about identity/identities, personal experiences, legislation, history, communication access, disability solidarity, justice and more.

== Release ==
A plain-language summary of the book written by Sara Luterman was published on the Disability Visibility Project website in June 2020. The audiobook of Disability Visibility was read by Alejandra Ospina and Alice Wong. An infographic and discussion guide were released alongside the book.

An adapted version of the anthology designed for young adult and adolescent readers was published by Delacorte Press the following year.

== Background ==
A Disability Visibility newsletter was published multiple times a month on Substack alongside the book releases and Disability Visibility Project.

Included authors Talila Lewis, Stacey Milbern and Maysoon Zayid all had work in Wong's prior 2018 anthology Resistance and Hope: Essays by Disabled People. Naomi Ortiz, who designed the book's discussion guide, was also in Resistance and Hope.

Ellen Samuels and Harriet McBride Johnson both have pieces in the Disability Studies Reader, a core text for disability studies.

Wong followed up Disability Visibility with a 2022 memoir, Year of the Tiger: An Activist's Life and a 2024 anthology Disability Intimacy: Essays on Love, Care, and Desire. Wong died in 2025 at the age of 51.

== Included authors ==
- Zipporah Arielle
- Patty Berne
- Keah Brown
- Diana M. Cejas
- Rebecca Cokley
- Sky Cubacub
- Jen Deerinwater
- Wanda Díaz-Merced
- June Eric-Udorie
- Karolyn Gehrig
- Haben Girma
- Eugene Grant
- Ariel Henley
- Jamison Hill
- Sandy Ho
- Shoshana Kessock
- Talila A. Lewis
- Harriet McBryde Johnson
- Reyma McCoy McDeid
- Lateef McLeod
- Stacey Milbern
- Liz Moore
- Leah Lakshmi Piepzna-Samarasinha
- Mari Ramsawakh
- A.H. Reaume
- Keshia Scott
- Ellen Samuels
- Alice Sheppard
- Elsa Sjunneson
- Jessica Slice
- s.e. smith
- Ricardo T. Thornton, Sr.
- Jillian Weise
- Britney Wilson
- Jeremy Woody
- Maysoon Zayid
- Harriet Tubman Collective

== Reception ==
Disability Visibility had a positive critical reception upon its release. The Chicago Tribune named it one of the "best books published in summer 2020". The Progressive Magazine columnist Mike Ervin named Disability Visibility his favorite book of 2020. The anthology was included in Entropy's Best of Nonfiction. Porchlight Books highlighted Disability Visibility as a "book to watch" and Karla J. Strand for Ms. Magazine included the anthology in their list of "June 2020 Reads for the Rest of Us" as the month's required reading.

Shondaland named Disability Visibility one of "10 Books Set to Become the New Feminist Classics," writing that "Roughly 15 percent of people around the world have a disability, and yet their stories are often never told. Alice Wong's anthology, Disability Visibility, brings their narratives front and center with the goal of showcasing the wide range of modern disability experiences."

Disability Visibility was included in the National Library of Medicine's Reading Club.

The book was included on the American Library Association's Rise: A Feminist Book Project's Top Ten list of 2022.

The audiobook is a Perspectives on Disability Bestseller on Libro.fm.
