= Sunshine Social Welfare Foundation =

- 陽光社會福利基金會
- Formation: 1981
- Headquarters: Zhongshan, Taipei, Taiwan
- Website: www.sunshine.org.tw

Sunshine Social Welfare Foundation (Chinese: 陽光社會福利基金會; pinyin: Yángguāng Shèhuì Fúlì Jījīn Huì) is a charity established in 1981 in Taiwan to provide comprehensive services for burn survivors and people with facial disfigurement.

Inspired by the book written by burn survivor SHEN Xiao-Ya entitled People Who Shun the Sun, a group of public-minded individuals from the media, business, medical and NPO sectors, joined people with facial disfigurement to launch a fundraising campaign in 1981. Small donations raised with the public were the basis for the establishment of Sunshine Social Welfare Foundation.

Sunshine has for mission to provide “comprehensive services for burn survivors and people with facial disfigurement; to assist them in their physical, psychological and social rehabilitation; to uphold their human rights and dignity.”

Clients of the Foundation include burn survivors, oral cancer survivors, people with hemangioma, neurofibromatosis, cleft lip and palate, and other types of disfigurement that are the result of accident or disease.

The Foundation helps burn survivors and people with facial disfigurement by offering physical rehabilitation services in its Rehabilitation Center, financial aid, psychological counseling, school re-entry counseling and vocational counseling. The Foundation also operates carwash centers in the greater Taipei area, which serve as a training platform to facilitate return to work of burn survivors and oral cancer survivors.

The Foundation also works towards changing society's perception of people with facial disfigurement and overcoming stigma. Through social education in schools and communities, and through advocacy, Sunshine seeks greater respect and equal rights for people with facial disfigurement.

Sunshine won second place in the 2005 Asia Pacific NGO Awards organized by Resource Alliance and Citigroup. The Foundation also won the 2011 Presidential Culture Award (總統文化獎) in the philanthropy category.
