= Noelle Howey =

American writer

Noelle Howey (born 1971/1972) is an American writer and executive. She won the 2003 Lambda Literary Award for Transgender Literature for Dress Codes (2002), a memoir inspired in part by her experiences with her father's transitioning, as well as two Lambda Literary Awards for the essay anthology Out of the Ordinary (2000). She has also worked as a senior magazine editor, including for Glamour, Time Out, and Real Simple.

== Biography ==
Howey was born in Ohio, and raised in an Ohio suburb. She is the daughter of Dinah Howey-Mouat, an advertising executive and Meals on Wheels director, and Christine Howey, a transgender woman who worked as an advertising executive, poet, and actor in Cleveland. She had learned about Christine's cross-dressing from Dinah as a teenager, and as a young adult went to Belgium when Christine had gender reassignment surgery there. She obtained her BA from Oberlin College in 1994. She worked as a reporter and producer for NPR.

In 2000, Howey and Ellen Samuels edited Out of the Ordinary, an anthology of essays from the children of LGBT parents, focusing on their relationship with them; they won both the 2001 Lambda Literary Award for Anthologies and Nonfiction and Children's and Young Adult Literature for the book. She was a 2001 New York Foundation for the Arts Fellow.

In 2002, Howey released Dress Codes, a memoir about her personal experiences with her parents, including her mother's transitioning. It was featured on Good Morning America's Read This! book club segment in 2002. She won the 2003 Lambda Literary Award for Transgender Literature for Dress Codes, as well as a 2003 Stonewall Book Award in Non-Fiction.

Howey has also worked in journalism, including as a senior editor for Glamour, editor-in-chief for Time Out New York Kids, and deputy editor for Real Simple. She has written articles for Dame, Ms. Magazine, Daily Beast, Mother Jones, the New York Times, and more. She also wrote book reviews for the Cleveland Free Times.

She published the blog My Fearless Year in 2015.

She also worked as an Cultural Engagement & Advocacy executive for Everytown for Gun Safety, leading the #WearOrange Campaign. In 2024, she joined Blue State Digital as Managing Director of Strategic Communications and Creative Director.

Howey has one daughter and one son. Howey currently lives in New Jersey.

== Bibliography ==
- Out of the Ordinary (2000)
- Dress Codes (2002)
- 50 Years of Ms.: The Best of the Pathfinding Magazine That Ignited a Revolution (2023)
