= James Partridge =

British businessman

- Born: 30 October 1952; Chipping Sodbury, Gloucestershire, England
- Died: 16 August 2020 (aged 67)
- Occupation: Founder of Changing Faces

James Richard John Partridge OBE (30 October 1952 – 16 August 2020) was the founder and chief executive of the charity Changing Faces.

== Early and personal life ==
Born in Chipping Sodbury, Gloucestershire, and educated at Clifton College, Bristol, Partridge sustained 40% burns to his face, upper body, arms, and hands in a car accident at the age of 18 in 1970. A year later, he went to University College, Oxford, from where he graduated with a degree in politics, philosophy, and economics in 1975. After studying for a master of science in medical demography at the London School of Hygiene and Tropical Medicine, he became a health economist in the National Health Service.

He married Caroline Schofield in 1978 and moved to her native Guernsey, where he became a dairy farmer and later worked as an economics teacher. They have three children.

Partridge died on 16 August 2020, at the age of 67.

== Changing Faces charity ==
Partridge wrote 'Changing Faces: the Challenge of Facial Disfigurement' about his experience, which was published by Penguin Books in 1990. A series of meetings over the following two years led him to found Changing Faces in 1992.

Changing Faces is a British charity supporting and representing children, young people, and adults who have disfigurements to the face, hands, or body, whether present from birth or caused by accident, injury, or illness or medical episode. It campaigns to change public opinion and combat discrimination, and to help and support those with a visual difference.

== Channel 5 ==
On 16 November 2009, Partridge fronted the lunchtime bulletin for a week for Channel Five in an attempt to try to break down prejudice.

== Awards ==
- One of eight RADAR 'People of the Year' (1992)
- Honorary Doctor of Science, University of the West of England (1999)
- Appointed Officer of the Order of the British Empire (2002)
- Human Rights Lifetime Achievement Award, RADAR (2003)
- Honorary Fellow of the Royal College of Surgeons of Edinburgh (2005)
- Honorary Doctor of Science, University of Bristol (2005)
- Third Sector award for Most Admired Charity Chief Executive (2010)
- Beacon Prize for Leadership (2010)
- Lifetime Achievement Award, the National Diversity Awards (2013)
