= Diana M. Cejas =

Pediatric neurologist, author and disability advocate

Diana Mercedes Cejas
- Born: 1981 (age 44–45); Norfolk, Virginia, U.S.
- Education: Appalachian State University, BS, Biology, 2003 University of North Carolina at Charlotte, BA, Physics, 2005 Howard University, MD, 2010 Pediatric Residency Program, Tulane University School of Medicine, 2013 Masters of Public Health, Maternal and Child Health, George Washington University, 2014 Child Neurology Residency Training Program, University of Chicago, 2017
- Awards: Broyhill Research Award in Child Neurology, 2020 Finalist, PEN Center USA Award for Creative Nonfiction, 2023 Elected Board Member of the Child Neurology Society 2022-2024
- Scientific career
- Workplaces: University of North Carolina, Chapel Hill

Diana M. Cejas is an American pediatric neurologist, author and disability advocate, currently working at the University of North Carolina and the Carolina Institute of Developmental Disabilities.

== Early life, medical school and disability ==
Cejas was born in Virginia, but grew up in Rougemont, North Carolina.

While Cejas was a medical student at Howard University, she found a lump on her neck. Dismissed by her medical providers, she was not diagnosed with cancer until her second year of residency. After the second surgery for her cancer, she had a stroke, which left her with residual dysarthria and hemiparesis. She struggled during her residency due to lack of accommodations for disabled physicians.

== Career ==
Cejas works at the University of North Carolina as a pediatric neurologist and assistant professor. She has a dual appointment at the Carolina Institute of Developmental Disabilities where she sees children with developmental disabilities.

She is a member of the American Academy of Neurology and was selected for the Diversity Leadership Program in 2022. She co-created the Diversity, Equity, and Inclusion Task Force of the Child Neurology Society in 2021 and was elected to the board as the Councilor from the South for 2022–2024.

Cejas is on the advisory committee for the Docs with Disabilities Initiative. She also sits on the advisory panel of the Patient-Centered Outcomes Research Institute (PCORI) on Healthcare Delivery and Disparities Research.

Her work has been published in literary magazines including The Iowa Review, Ecotone, and Passages North; and anthologies including Disability Visibility: First-Person Stories from the Twenty-First Century and A Measure of Belonging: Twenty-One Writers of Color on the New American South. She is currently working on a collection of essays describing her life as a physician and a patient.

== Honors, societies, and awards ==
- Broyhill Research Award in Child Neurology, 2020
- MacDowell Literary Fellowship, 2024

== Selected works ==
=== Peer-reviewed articles ===
- Kim Y-M, Cejas DM. Empowering differences: Disability in child neurology training. Annals of the Child Neurology Society. 2023 16 August 2023 https://onlinelibrary.wiley.com/doi/full/10.1002/cns3.20036
- Cejas DM. Changing views of disability. Lancet Neurol. 2023 Sep;22(9):781. doi: 10.1016/S1474-4422(23)00276-4. PMID 37596003. https://www.thelancet.com/journals/laneur/article/PIIS1474-4422(23)00276-4/fulltext
- Brumback AC, Wilson RB, Augustine EF, Bass NE, Bassuk AG, Cejas DM, Shellhaas RA, Strober JB, Tilton AC, Pearl PL. Introducing the Child Neurology Society Leadership, Diversity, Equity, and Inclusion Task Force. Ann Neurol. 2021 Oct;90(4):537-538. doi: 10.1002/ana.26176. Epub 2021 Aug 4. PMID 34288089. https://onlinelibrary.wiley.com/doi/10.1002/ana.26176
- Houtrow A, Martin AJ, Harris D, Cejas D, Hutson R, Mazloomdoost Y, Agrawal RK. Health Equity for Children and Youth With Special Health Care Needs: A Vision for the Future. Pediatrics. 2022 Jun 1;149(Suppl 7):e2021056150F. doi: 10.1542/peds.2021-056150F. PMID 35642875. https://pubmed.ncbi.nlm.nih.gov/35642875/

=== Creative nonfiction ===
- Convalescence Triptych https://losangelesreview.org/convalescence-triptych-diana-cejas/
- Human Growth and Development Passages North https://www.passagesnorth.com/passagesnorthcom/2019/6/7/human-growth-and-development-by-diana-cejas
- I Have a Disability Too, I Told My Patient. Medpage Today, June 30, 2021 https://www.medpagetoday.com/opinion/second-opinions/93361
- Taking Charge of My Story as a Cancer Patient at the Hospital Where I Work. https://catapult.co/stories/taking-charge-of-my-story-as-a-cancer-patient-at-the-hospital-where-i-work
- The First Thing I Wrote. MedHumChat. https://www.medhumchat.com/medhumchat-blog/2019/11/22/the-first-thing-i-wrote
- To struggling medical students: Meet the physician who conquered the “no’s” https://www.kevinmd.com/2019/06/to-struggling-medical-students-meet-the-physician-who-conquered-the-nos.html
- My story isn't Serena Williams’ story, but some things sound the same https://www.kevinmd.com/2018/08/my-story-isnt-serena-williams-story-but-some-things-sound-the-same.html
- Welcome to your intern year breakdown https://www.kevinmd.com/2018/06/welcome-to-your-intern-year-breakdown.html
- Cejas DM. Meat slurry and my particular brand of optimism. Neurology. March 6, 2018. 90 (10) 479-480 https://www.neurology.org/doi/10.1212/wnl.0000000000005078
- Cejas DM. A PIECE OF MY MIND. Every Little Anniversary. JAMA. 2015 Dec 1;314(21):2237. doi: 10.1001/jama.2015.12385. PMID 26624822. https://jamanetwork.com/journals/jama/article-abstract/2473497

=== Selected work on disability and advocacy ===
- "Expanding Diversity in Neurology, Inclusive Communication and Accessibility: Diana M. Cejas, MD, MPH" Neurology Live,19 May 2023 https://www.neurologylive.com/view/expanding-diversity-neurology-inclusive-communication-accessibility-diana-cejas
- Docs with Disabilities Podcast, Episode 22, Part 2: https://medicine.umich.edu/dept/family-medicine/programs/mdisability/transforming-medical-education/docs-disabilities-podcast/docswithdisabilities-podcast-ep-22-diana-cejas-alice-wong
- The Society to Improve Diagnosis in Medicine. "The Lingering Lump" https://www.improvediagnosis.org/stories_posts/the-lingering-lump-diana-cejas-story/
