= Visible difference =

Distinguishable physical characteristic

A visible difference refers to a physical characteristic, such as a scar, mark, disfigurement, or condition on the face or body that distinguishes an individual from what is conventionally considered to be the societal norm. These visible differences can arise due to a multitude of factors including but not limited to congenital conditions, accidents, diseases, or surgical procedures. Such differences can carry significant psychological, social, and sometimes physical implications for the affected individual.

== Terminology ==
While the terms visible difference and disfigurement are sometimes used interchangeably, they are not synonymous. The term visible difference is a more neutral, encompassing descriptor for any physical characteristic that sets an individual apart from what is generally considered the societal norm. This could be due to congenital conditions, acquired conditions, diseases, or even personal choices like tattoos or piercings. The critical element is that the difference is visible, but the term does not inherently imply any impairment, disadvantage, or negative valuation.

Disfigurement is a term that has traditionally been used in both legal and medical contexts to refer to physical alterations that are often perceived as impairing the appearance of an individual in a significant way. Disfigurement generally carries a more negative connotation and often implies a level of severity or permanence to the condition that may result in social, emotional, or functional difficulties for the affected individual.

== Background and history ==
=== Early perceptions ===
In many ancient cultures, visible differences were often attributed to supernatural causes or seen as a sign of divine intervention. For example, birthmarks were sometimes viewed as omens or indicators of future events, both positive and negative.

=== Modern medicine ===
In the 19th and early 20th centuries, significant strides were made in dermatology and plastic surgery, which allowed for a more nuanced comprehension and treatment of these conditions. The latter half of the 20th century saw further research into the psychological and emotional impact of visible differences, paralleling the rise of psychology as a distinct scientific discipline.

=== Activism and milestones ===
The latter part of the 20th century also saw the rise of activism aimed at destigmatizing visible differences and advocating for legal protections. Landmark legislation, such as the Americans with Disabilities Act (ADA) in the United States and the Equality Act in the United Kingdom, have created legal protections for people with visible differences.

Changing Faces is a UK-based organization that advocates for people living with visible differences.

== Types of visible differences ==
Visible differences

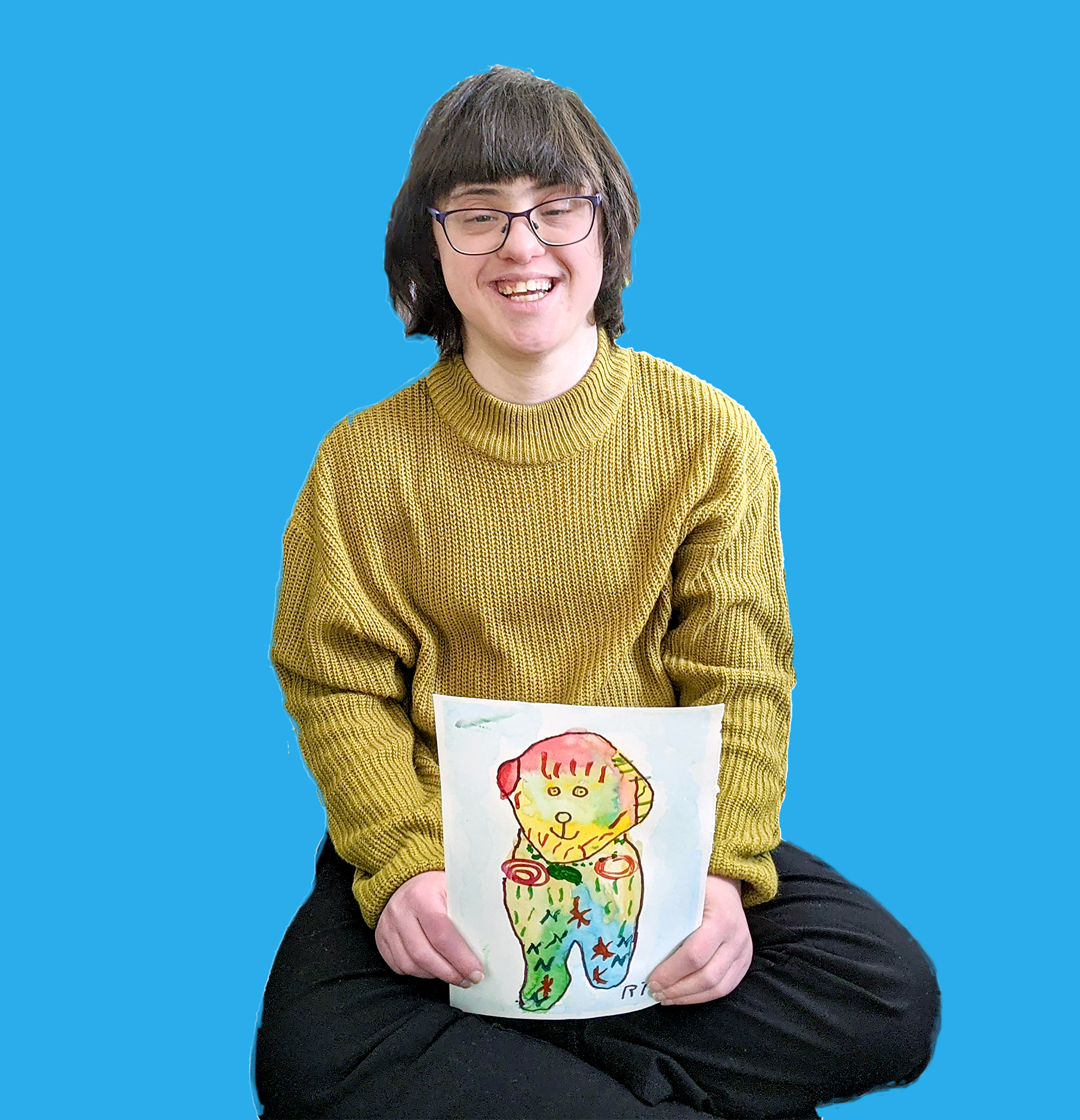
Down syndrome (Rita Winkler)

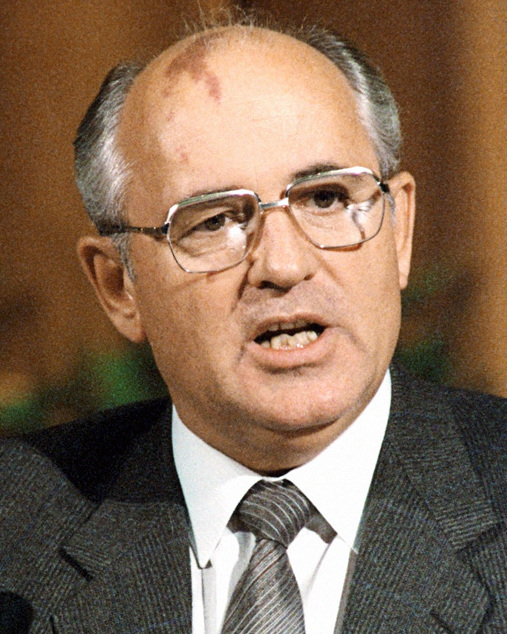
Birthmarks (Mikhail Gorbachev)

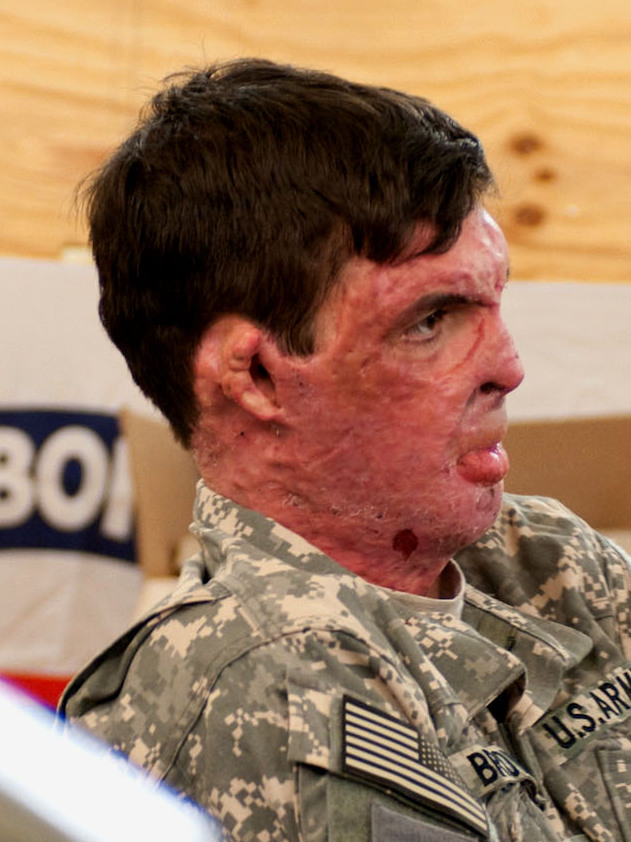
Burn scars (Sam Brown)

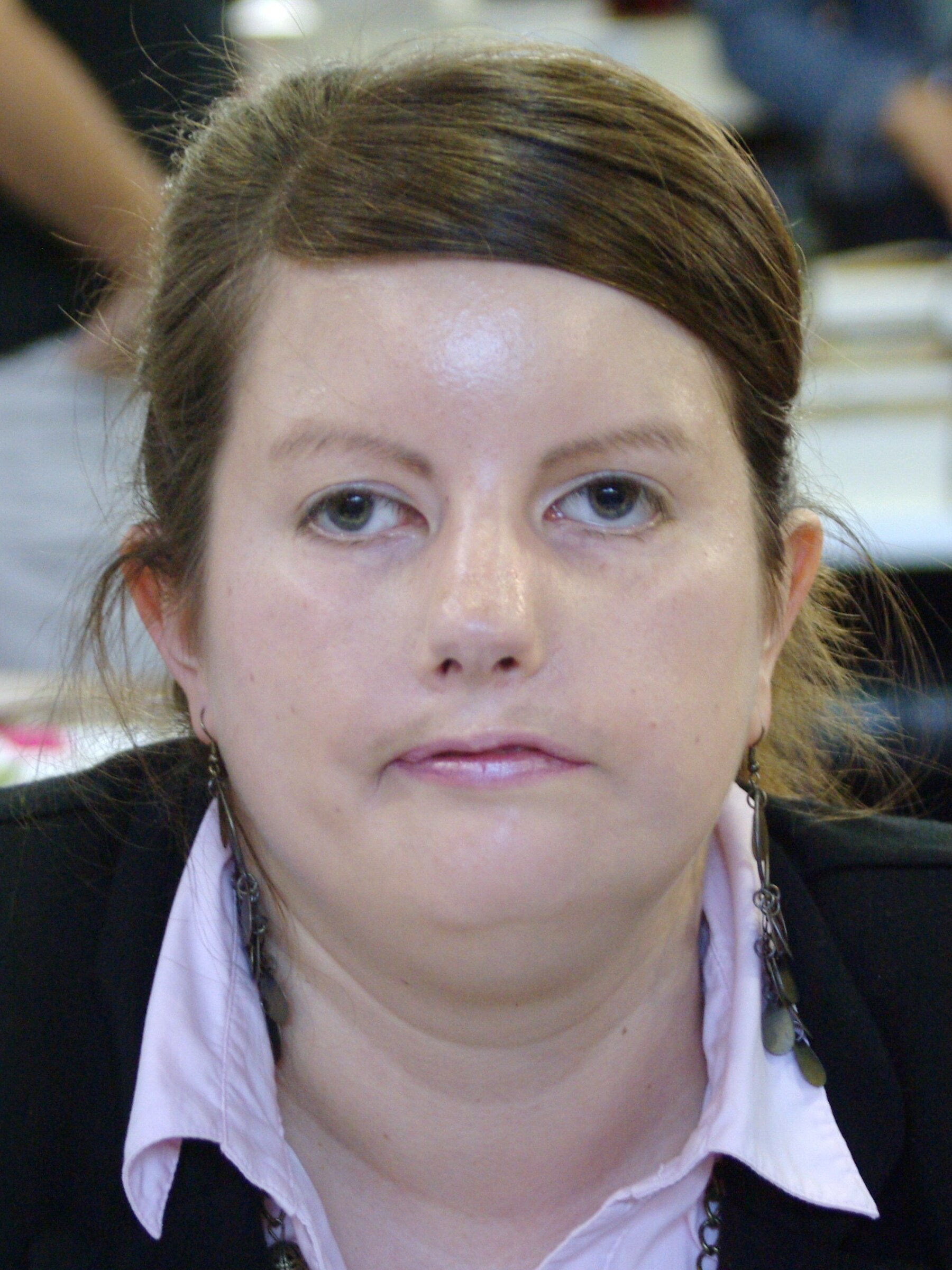
Moebius syndrome (Ana María Haebig)

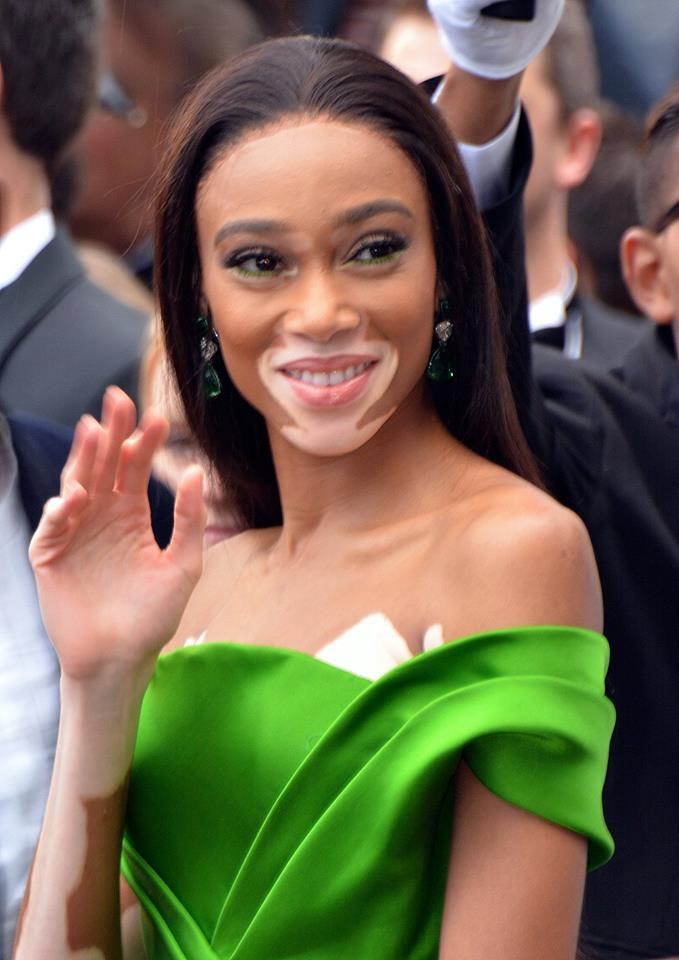
Vitiligo (Winnie Harlow)

Visible differences can be categorized based on origin, location, and impact.

=== Congenital conditions ===
These are visible differences present from birth and are often the result of genetic factors or prenatal influences.

- Birthmark: Size, shape, and color can vary.
- Cleft lip or palate: A condition with an opening in the upper lip and/or palate.
- Port-wine stain: Reddish or purplish marks that usually occur on the face.

=== Acquired conditions ===
These visible differences arise due to external factors, such as accidents or medical treatments.

- Scar: Can result from injuries, surgeries, or severe acne.
- Vitiligo: This condition causes patches of skin to lose their pigment.
- Burn: Severe burns can lead to scarring and discoloration of the skin.
- Amputation: Removal of a limb, often due to injury or infection.

=== Diseases ===
Certain diseases can cause visible differences either directly or as a side effect of treatment.

- Acne: Often associated with adolescence but can persist into adulthood, leading to scarring or pigmentation.
- Psoriasis: Characterized by red, scaly patches on the skin.
- Autoimmune disease: Diseases like lupus can cause visible skin rashes or facial flushing.
- Alopecia areata: Leads to hair loss, commonly on the scalp.

== Psychological impact ==
=== Self-esteem and body image ===
People with a visible difference often face self-esteem and body image challenges. Concerns about appearance can dominate their self-perception, which may lead to feelings of inadequacy or unattractiveness. This can be particularly challenging during adolescence.

Studies have shown that individuals with visible differences are at a higher risk of developing anxiety disorders and depression. The constant awareness of being different and the fear of being judged or rejected can increase anxiety levels. Chronic feelings of isolation or stigmatization can lead to depression.

The social implications of having a visible difference can sometimes lead to withdrawal or isolation. Avoidance behavior, such as skipping social events or avoiding public places, can exacerbate feelings of loneliness and perpetuate a cycle of emotional distress.

In some cases, individuals with a visible difference may develop body dysmorphic disorder, a mental health condition characterized by obsessive focus on perceived flaws in physical appearance. Importantly, these perceived flaws may be minor and not very noticeable to others.

=== Coping mechanisms ===
Individuals may employ various coping mechanisms, both adaptive and maladaptive, to deal with the psychological impact. While some may resort to avoidance or denial, others may seek social support or engage in constructive problem-solving.

Contrary to common assumptions, the psychological distress associated with having a visible difference does not necessarily correlate with the visibility or severity of the condition. Factors such as personal resilience, availability of social support, and pre-existing mental health conditions often play a more significant role in determining the level of psychological impact.

== See also ==
- Changing Faces (charity)
- Face equality
