= James J. Berg =

American writer, scholar, editor

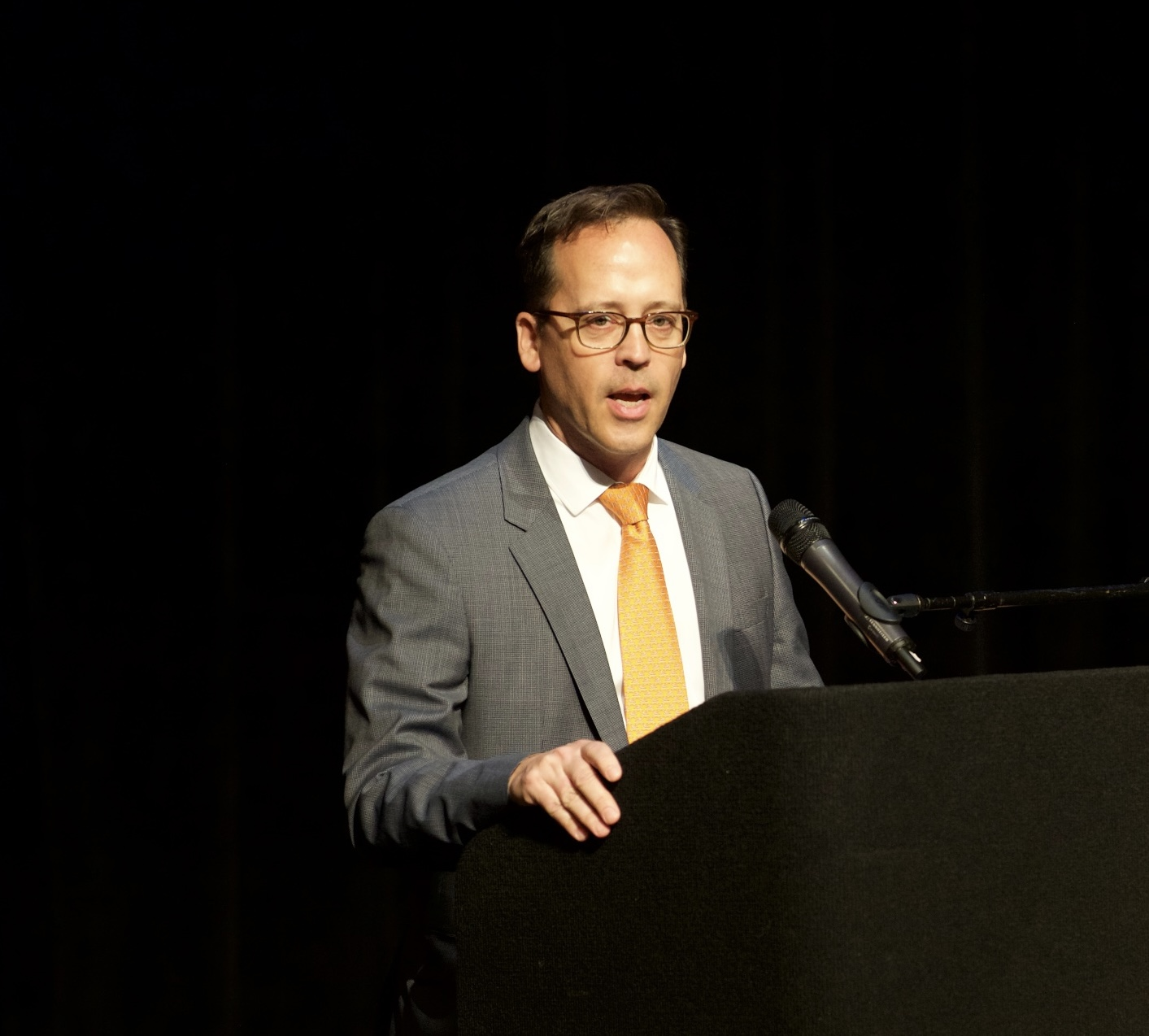
James J. Berg 2016 BMCC MEOC Address

James J. Berg (born July 1, 1964, Superior, Wisconsin) is an American writer, scholar, and editor. He is known primarily for his academic publications on Christopher Isherwood. He is also known for his work as a developmental editor working with writers on academic and nonacademic projects. His noted academic work includes The Isherwood Century (U Wisconsin Press), edited with Chris Freeman. Other works with Freeman include Conversations with Christopher Isherwood (University Press of Mississippi), The American Isherwood, and Isherwood in Transit. His most recent book is Isherwood on Writing (U Minnesota Press, 2008, 2022).

== Early life and education ==
Berg attended the University of Minnesota, studying English and Theater, where earned a Bachelor of Arts in 1986. He studied in London in 1985, where he first encountered Isherwood's works. He continued his studies and earned a Master of Arts in English from the University of Minnesota in 1992. In 1997, Berg earned his Doctor of Philosophy at the University of Minnesota, where he wrote a dissertation on E. M. Forster under Peter Edgerly Firchow and Toni McNaron.

== Career ==
Berg's professional career began in Minneapolis as a Post-Doctoral Visiting Lecturer at the University of Minnesota. He then worked for the Collaboration for the Advancement of College Teaching & Learning, St. Paul, MN. At the University of Maine, Berg was a founding Director of the Center for Teaching Excellence.

He went on to become the Dean of Liberal Arts & Sciences at Lake Superior College, Duluth, MN 2004-2007 where he led the general education division. From there, Berg moved to Palm Desert, CA as the Dean of Arts & Sciences at the College of the Desert, Palm Desert. After nine years, he moved across the country, accepting the role of Associate Dean of Faculty at the Borough of Manhattan Community College. in New York City. While there, he led faculty development for teaching and research in a college with over 1500 full- and part-time educators from 2016 to 2021. Berg is now executive Director of LGBTQ Leaders in Higher Education.

Simultaneously, Berg began his scholarly writing on Christopher Isherwood. He was first published in 2000 and wrote numerous books over the following decades. "Indeed, Berg and Freeman have shaped Isherwood studies through their interventions, and Isherwood in Transit extends that work in truly exciting ways." Janine Utell, Widener University

For Isherwood's centenary, Berg was interviewed by The New York Times. He appears in the documentary Chris and Don: a Love Story directed by Guido Santi and Tina Mascara. Berg lectures internationally on Isherwood.

Berg has also taught literature, writing and higher education courses at Teachers College, Columbia University (New York, NY), California State University, San Bernardino (Palm Desert Campus, CA), University of Maine (Orono, ME), and University of Minnesota (Minneapolis, MN).

=== Selected publications ===
- The Isherwood Century: Essays on the Life and Work of Christopher Isherwood Co-edited and introduced with Chris Freeman. University of Wisconsin Press, 2000.
- Isherwood on Writing. Edited with an introduction. University of Minnesota Press, 2008 (paperback 2022)
- Love, West Hollywood. Co-edited and introduced with Chris Freeman. Alyson Publications. 2008.
- The American Isherwood. Co-edited and introduced with Chris Freeman. University of Minnesota Press, 2015.
- Isherwood in Transit Co-edited and introduced with Chris Freeman. University of Minnesota Press, 2020.
- Article: Isherwood the Multiculturalist, 2010.
- Essay: Seven things you didn't know about Christopher Isherwood, 2015.
- Essay: Geraldo Rivera Outed Me, 2023.

=== Selected Presentations and Workshops ===
- "Writing for Publication," Guttman Community College, City University of New York. 2023
- "Getting Started: Workshop for New Faculty Developers," invited presenter. POD Network Conference, "Leading in Times of Change." 2018, 2019, 2021.
- "Remote and Obscure: Isherwood in Los Angeles," invited keynote, Significations Conference, California State University, Los Angeles. 2016.
- "The American Isherwood," Invited address at Huntington Library, 2008.

== Awards ==
• Lambda Literary Award for Gay Studies, for The Isherwood Century. 2000.

• Christopher Isherwood Foundation Fellowship, Huntington Library, San Marino, CA, 2002–2003.

• Scholars Work-in-Progress Grant, Minnesota Humanities Commission, 2002–2003.

• Lambda Literary Award for LGBLQ Anthology – Finalist, for Love, West Hollywood 2008.
