= Changing Faces (charity) =

United Kingdom charity

- Pronunciation: /ˈtʃeɪndʒɪŋˈfeɪsɪz/ CHAYN-jing-FAY-siz
- Formation: 1992
- Founder: Dr James Partridge OBE
- Founded at: London
- Registration no.: 1011222
- Purpose: To help those who suffer from facial or other physical disfigurement to covercome social, physical, psychological, and emotional disadvantage
- Location: United Kingdom
- Services: Skin camouflage services, support line, support sessions, workshops, advocacy
- Key people: Heather Blake (Chief Executive), David Clayton (Chair of the Trustees)
- Revenue: £1,238,012 (2022)
- Expenses: £1,926,541 (2022)
- Staff: 48 (2022)
- Volunteers: 30 (2022)
- Website: ChangingFaces.org.uk

Changing Faces is a UK-based charity that advocates for individuals with a visible difference to the face, hands, or body, offering support and representation. The organization provides guidance for those with an unusual appearance caused by congenital conditions, accidents, injuries, illnesses, or medical treatments.

== History ==
The charity was founded in 1992 by James Partridge OBE, who sustained severe burns in a car fire when he was 18 years old. He wrote about the experience in a book, Changing Faces, in the late 1980s, and was persuaded to set up the charity after speaking about it with doctors from University College Hospital in London.

== Operations ==
The charity provides psychological support for people with visible differences, including disfigurements, by providing advice, information, counselling, and workshops across the UK. It also provides advice to health professionals, teachers, and employers, by running training courses and study days that enable professionals to develop effective clinical services, inclusive school curricula, and equal-opportunities policies.

While modern reconstructive surgery and other medical treatments can make disfigurement less noticeable, some scarring, asymmetry, or change in complexion usually remains. Changing Faces complements medical and surgical interventions by addressing the psychological and social challenges posed by disfigurement. Its services are based on academic research and informed by service users, including a Young People's Council.

In 2012, the British Red Cross transferred its Skin Camouflage Service to Changing Faces. The service "helps individuals to regain self-confidence and independence", and now operates at more than 120 locations throughout the UK.

=== Campaigns ===
The charity's Face Equality campaign (currently Face Equality Week) aims to ensure that people with disfigurement are treated without prejudice or discrimination. The campaign targets employers, schools, health care professionals, the media, policy makers, and the general public, and has used posters featuring adults and children with facial disfigurement. In November 2009, Partridge presented the lunchtime news bulletins on UK television channel Five.

The What Success Looks Like campaign seeks to transform the treatment of disfigurement in the workplace. Through employers and industry bodies, it aims to inform business leaders and human-resource managers about disfigurement. It also serves to help people living with a visual difference to overcome barriers.

In 2017, the charity released a set of educational resources to help school teachers raise the topic of facial disfigurement among pupils. These resources were launched to coincide with the UK release of the movie Wonder, which tells the story of a boy born with a craniofacial condition. In the same year, the charity collaborated on a series of portraits taken by photographer Rankin, to challenge conventions of beauty in the fashion industry.

In 2017, the charity released Disfigurement in the UK, a report into the experience of people who live with a condition, mark, or scar affecting their appearance, with consideration of the issue against school, work, relationships, health care, and crime. The report was released on the charity's Face Equality Day.

In 2018, the charity launched its I Am Not Your Villain campaign, which seeks to achieve better representation of visible difference in the film industry. In Autumn 2021, they released a new video in the campaign - called I Am More Than Just Your Villain, in which the charity's campaigners appeared as the main characters from major films, such as Dorothy from The Wizard of Oz and James Bond from the 007 franchise.

Other campaigns active in 2021 include Pledge To Be Seen, which calls on brands to better represent visible difference, Visible Hate, which seeks to raise awareness of hate crime against people with visible differences, and You're Not Alone, which raises awareness of the impacts on men with visible difference.

== People ==
The chief executive is Heather Blake and chairman is David Clayton.

Patrons have included actor Michelle Dockery, Rory Bremner, William Simons, Lord Fellowes of West Stafford, Simon Weston OBE, poet Benjamin Zephaniah, and comedian and actor Jan Ravens.
