= Disability Visibility Project =

American disability organization

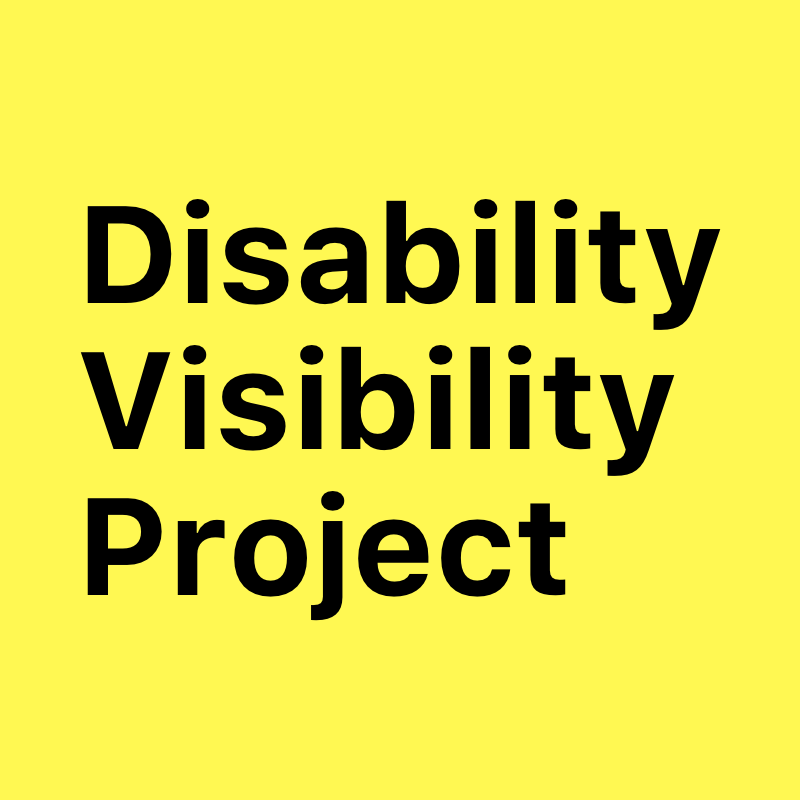
Disability Visibility Project (yellow background with black text)

The Disability Visibility Project (DVP) is an online community dedicated to creating, recording, sharing and amplifying disability culture, stories and media.

The DVP is a community partnership with StoryCorps, an American oral history organization dedicated to preserving and sharing stories through interviews. Interviews recorded with StoryCorps are archived at the American Folklife Center at the Library of Congress with the permission of the interviewer.

The DVP platform consists mainly of blog posts and podcast episodes, also disability media collected from oral histories in the form of tweets, radio stories, audio clips and images.

== History ==
The DVP was founded by disability activist Alice Wong in 2014, who remains the sole creator and director of the project. There are around 61 million people living with disabilities in America, most of who are never represented in mainstream media. DVP hopes to create a body of history and knowledge about the lives and experiences of those who are disabled. It was created to preserve the experiences of this underrepresented group.

The project was originally a year-long campaign that would end in 2015 to celebrate 25 years since passage of the Americans with Disabilities Act of 1990 (ADA). Despite the law requiring specific parking spaces and ramps for disabled people, Wong believed that these efforts did not actually protect the disabled community. Wong remained critical of the ADA's progress and achievements, especially concerning disparities in healthcare, education and economic security, limiting the ability to fully participate in every aspect of society. DVP was launched as a way for the disabled community to take back control of their own narrative and dismantle the idea that living with a disability is either pitiful or inspirational. Because Wong believed that the disabled community was missing a documented history, she worked with StoryCorps to create the DVP and raise awareness of everyday people living with physical, mental and/or learning disabilities.

== Aims ==
The DVP works with StoryCorps to encourage disabled people to record their own oral histories and to share their lived experiences of disability. It to create intersectional, multimodal and accessible disabled media. The platform serves as a space for disabled people and people with disabilities to make their voices heard. Participants who share their interviews and stories contribute to an archive of powerful stories that are available to future generations.

== Archive ==
The Disability Visibility Project is an ongoing effort. The podcast, launched in 2017, includes over 80 episodes, each with an open and honest reflection of the experiences of the disability community. Topics range from video games, climate change, poetry, immigration, intersectionality, design, violence, mental health, to entrepreneurship.

A list of all DVP Interviews can be found on their website. Interviews are organized alphabetically by the interviewee's last name. Each interview page features an edited audio clip, image description and text transcript produced by the DVP team. The collection of interviews serves as an archive of disability culture and history.

The DVP blog publishes reports, news, blog posts, Q&A posts and original essays written by Wong, guest writers, and disabled people who are engaged with culture at every level. Topics include ableism, intersectionality, culture, media and politics from the perspective of disabled people.

Copies of oral history interviews are archived at the American Folklife Center at the Library of Congress if given permission by the interviewer.

== See also ==
- Disability Visibility: First-Person Stories from the Twenty-First Century - related anthology
