= Amy Poehler's Smart Girls =

Website aimed at helping young women

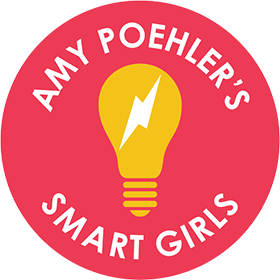

Amy Poehler's Smart Girls is an organization and website aimed at helping young women with life's problems in a funny and informative way. It was founded by actress Amy Poehler, Executive Director Meredith Walker, who was the former senior producer for Nick News and the head of talent for Saturday Night Live, and recording artist Amy Miles, who is involved in the musical content on the site. Smart Girls was purchased by Legendary Entertainment in 2014.

== Smart Girls at the Party ==
Amy Poehler's Smart Girls was originally Smart Girls at the Party, a YouTube channel dedicated to encouraging women and men to express themselves. Smart Girls at the Party was started around 2007 by Poehler and Walker and their first video was posted on YouTube in 2008.

Amy Poehler was quoted on Feminist.com talking about how she and her co founders came up with the idea for Smart Girls.

"The idea came out of us wishing we had a time machine so we could go back to the younger versions of ourselves and let them know it was gonna be ok. We wanted to do a show that we would have wanted to watch at that age. And we knew we wanted to have a dance party at the end. We basically started with the dance party and worked backwards."

The YouTube channel has since been changed to "Amy Poehler's Smart Girls" YouTube channel.

== YouTube channel ==
Smart Girls was started through YouTube and continues there today. Currently they have over 135,000 subscribers and over 8,475,000 views. The earliest video on their YouTube channel today is labeled The Feminist: Smart Girls W/ Amy Poehler, was posted in 2012 and features a young girl named Ruby explaining what feminism is. Smart Girls has grown especially in the last 3 years, they post several new videos through several different segments at least once a month.
