= Jean-Yves Tadié =

French academic, writer and biographer (born 1936)

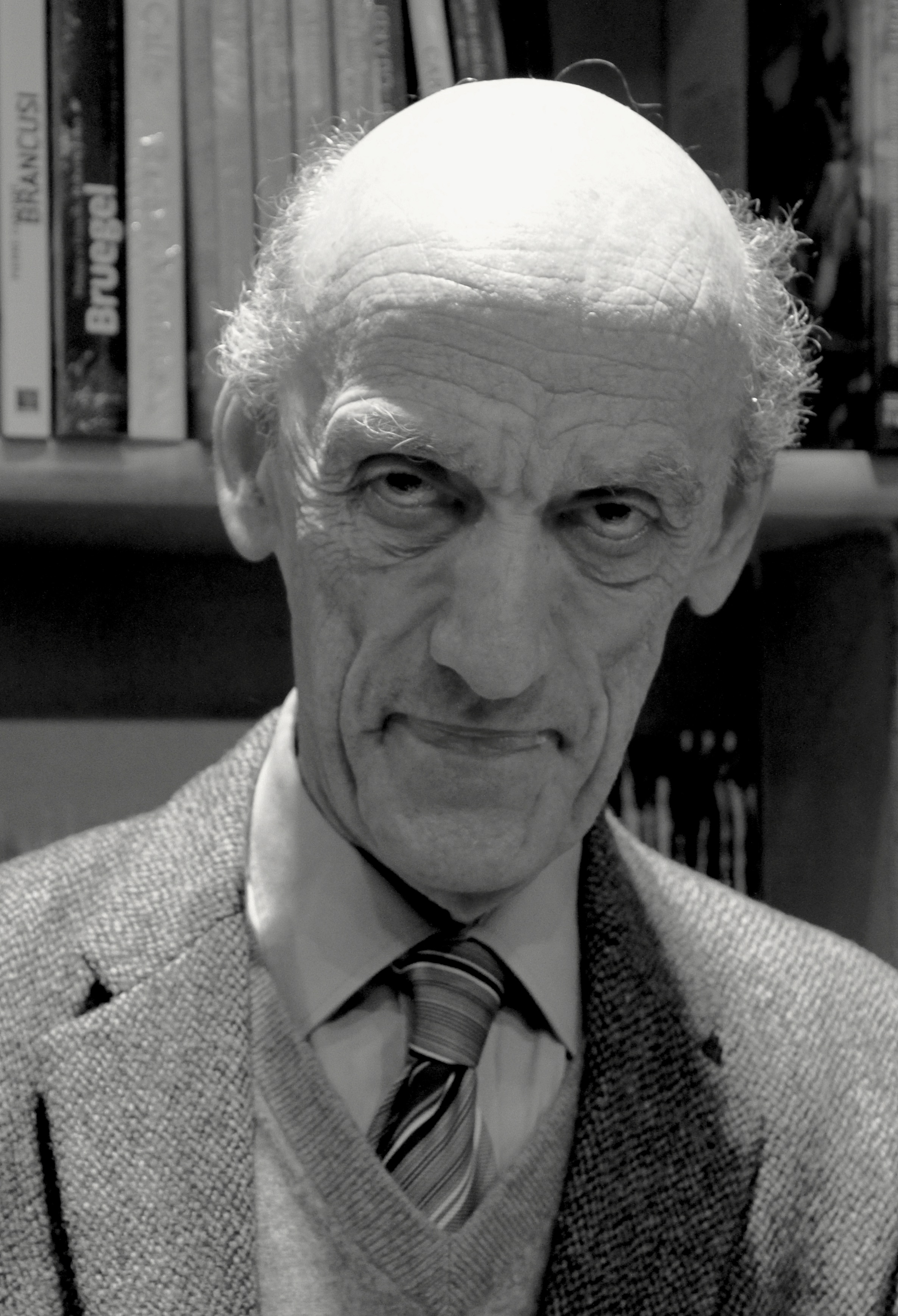
Tadié in 2013

Jean Yves Marie "Jean-Yves" Tadié (French pronunciation: [ʒɑ̃iv tadje]; born 7 September 1936) is a French writer, biographer, and academic, noted particularly for his work on Marcel Proust.

== Biography ==
A native of Boulogne-Billancourt, Tadié studied at the École normale supérieure in Paris, graduating in 1956. He began to publish his studies on Proust in 1959. He edited the 1987–1989 four-volume Pléiade edition of In Search of Lost Time (À la recherche du temps perdu), which includes sketches and variants. His study of À la recherche du temps perdu stands as one of the most revealing literary criticisms of Proust's novel. He explores the subtlety and distance of Proust's narrator, the circularity of the narrative and the sudden judgments on some of the characters later in the narrative. He published his biography of Proust in 1996 (English translation published in 2000).

Tadié was a professor at Paris-Sorbonne University (Paris-IV) and director of the collections "Folio classique" and "Folio théâtre". He is now professor emeritus at Paris-Sorbonne University.

Tadié has served as director of the "Folio Classique" and "Folio Théâtre" collections at Gallimard. For Gallimard and the Bibliothèque de la Pléiade edition, Tadié also worked on literature by Nathalie Sarraute and André Malraux.

Outside of France, Tadié was a director of the French Institute in London, a fellow at All Souls' College, Oxford (1988–1991) and faculty member of the Faculty of Medieval and Modern Languages at Oxford, as well as universities in Yaoundé, Alexandria, and Cairo. He has been a Commander in the Order of Arts and Letters since 2011 and Vice-President of the Société des Amis de Marcel Proust.

Tadié and his wife Arlette Khoury-Tadié have three children, Alexis, Benoît and Jérôme.

== Honours ==
- Knight of the Legion of Honour (2002)
- Commander of the Ordre des Arts et des Lettres (2011)

== Selected bibliography ==
- Introduction à la vie littéraire du XIXe siècle, Bordas, 1971.
- Lectures de Proust, Colin, 1971.
- Proust et le Roman, Gallimard, 1971.
- Le Récit poétique, PUF, 1978; Gallimard, 1994.
- Le Roman d’aventures, PUF, 1982.
- Proust, Belfond, 1983.
- La Critique littéraire au XXe siècle, Belfond, 1987.
- Études proustiennes I à VI, Gallimard, 1973–1988.
- Le Roman au XXe siècle, Belfond, 1990.
- Portrait de l’artiste, Oxford University Press, 1991.
- Marcel Proust, biographie, Gallimard, 1996 (English translation ISBN 0-14-100203-4).
- Le Sens de la mémoire (with Marc Tadié), Gallimard, 1999.
- Proust, la cathédrale du temps, Gallimard, coll. "Découvertes Gallimard" vol. 381, 1999.
- Regarde de tous tes yeux, regarde ! Gallimard, 2005.
- De Proust à Dumas, Gallimard, 2006.
- Le lac inconnu, entre Proust et Freud, Gallimard, 2012.
- Marcel Proust: Croquis d'une épopée, Gallimard, 2019.
