= Eugene Grant =

Eugene Grant may refer to:

- Eugene M. Grant, American real estate investor, philanthropist and civic leader
- Eugene L. Grant, American civil engineer and educator
