= Disfigurement =

State of having one's appearance injured or changed

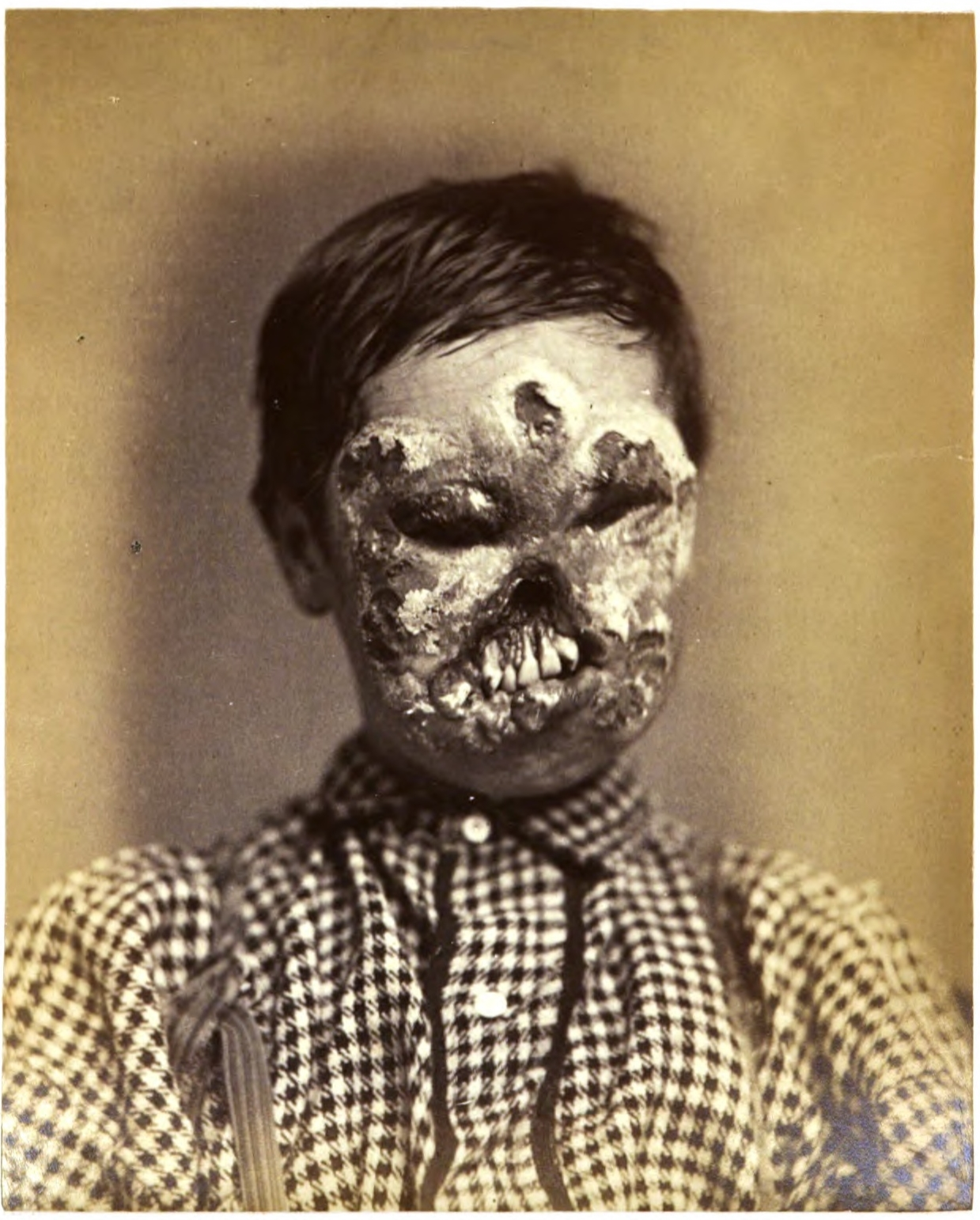
Face disfigured by syphilis

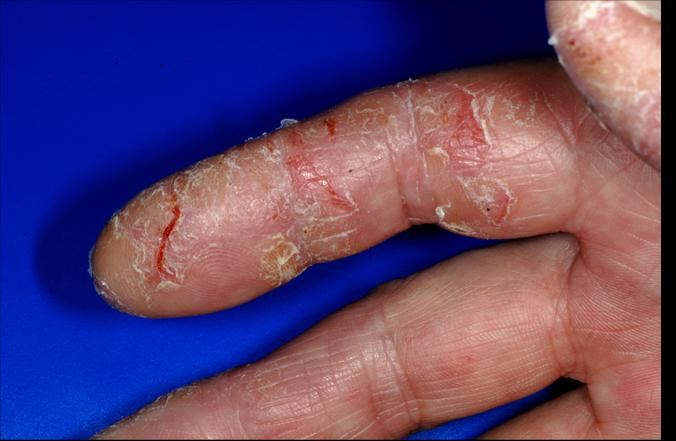
This individual has hand eczema, which causes significant harm to the skin.

Disfigurement is the state of having one's appearance deeply and persistently harmed medically, such as from a disease, birth defect, or wound. General societal attitudes towards disfigurement have varied greatly across cultures and over time, with cultures possessing strong social stigma against it often causing psychological distress to disfigured individuals. Alternatively, many societies have regarded some forms of disfigurement in a medical, scientific context where someone having ill will against the disfigured is viewed as anathema. In various religious and spiritual contexts, disfigurement has been variously described as being a punishment from the divine for sin (such as Yahweh's defacement of Cain for Abel's murder in Judaism), as being caused by supernatural forces of hate and evil against the good and just (such as Paul of the New Testament's arguments about Christ's sufferings), which will be later atoned for, or as being without explanation per se with people just having to endure.

The topic has been frequently commented on and referred to in a great many forms of fictional media as well. Villainous examples include the iconic fiend The Joker from various DC Comics and the mysterious figure with a "red right hand" from the song of the same name by the band Nick Cave and the Bad Seeds. Heroic examples include Daredevil, a crime-fighter who was rendered blind (from Marvel Comics), and the compassionate character Edward Scissorhands from the film of the same name. Antiheroic examples include Deadpool, a mercenary whose healing factor gives his skin a scarred appearance, and The Punisher, who has facial disfigurement, also from Marvel Comics.

== Overview ==
Disfigurement, whether caused by a benign or malignant condition, often leads to severe psychosocial problems such as negative body image; depression; difficulties in one's social, sexual, and professional lives; prejudice; and intolerance. This is partly due to how the individual copes with looking 'visibly different', though the extent of the disfigurement rarely correlates with the degree of distress the patient feels. An additional factor which affects people with a disfigurement is the reaction they get from other people. The general population responds to people with a disfigurement with less trust and respect, and often try to avoid making contact or having to look at the disfigurement. Disfigurements affecting visible areas, such as the face, arms, and hands, are thought to present greater difficulty for affected people to cope with than do other disfigurements.

Deliberate mutilation resulting in physical disfigurement has also been practiced by many cultures throughout human history for religious or judicial purposes. During the Byzantine Empire, the emperor was considered God's viceregent on Earth, and as such, the physical wholeness of his person was an essential complement to the perfection of Heaven. For this reason, many deposed emperors were blinded, had their noses cut off, or their tongues split by their successors, as these permanent disfigurements disqualified them from ever reclaiming the throne.

A case of voluntary disfigurement is that of St. Æbbe the Younger and the nuns of Coldingham Monastery in Scotland. When the monastery was attacked by Vikings, she and the other nuns cut off their own noses and upper lips, fearing rape. In response, the Vikings burned down the building with the nuns inside.

Some cases of disfigurement may also result from animal attacks, like Charla Nash, whose face and hands were disfigured in an attack by her friend's pet chimpanzee, Travis.

== Causes ==
Conditions that can cause disfigurement include:

- severe or mismanaged acne
- acromegaly
- amniotic band constriction
- alopecia
- amputation
- argyria
- birthmarks
- burns
- cancer
- cataracts
- circumcision
- cleft lip
- eczema
- elephantiasis
- erysipelas
- frostbite
- gangrene
- gigantomastia
- gynecomastia
- keloids
- leprosy
- necrosis
- McCune–Albright syndrome
- Moebius syndrome
- neurofibromatosis
- noma
- paralysis
- proteus syndrome
- radiation poisoning
- scalping
- scars
- smallpox
- severe strabismus
- synkinesis
- syphilis
- vitiligo
- severe warts
- Psoriasis

Plastic surgery or reconstructive surgery is available in many cases to disfigured people. Some health insurance companies and government health care systems cover plastic surgery for these problems when they do not generally cover plastic surgery for what is labeled as "cosmetic purposes".

The term "disfigurement" is sometimes used pejoratively to describe the results of intentional body modification. Scarification and other forms of such modification are sometimes referred to as such by neutral parties or by advocates of the processes, as well. Many types of body modification are subject to strong social debate as such.

== Society and culture ==
People with disfigurement are often treated poorly.

=== In fiction ===
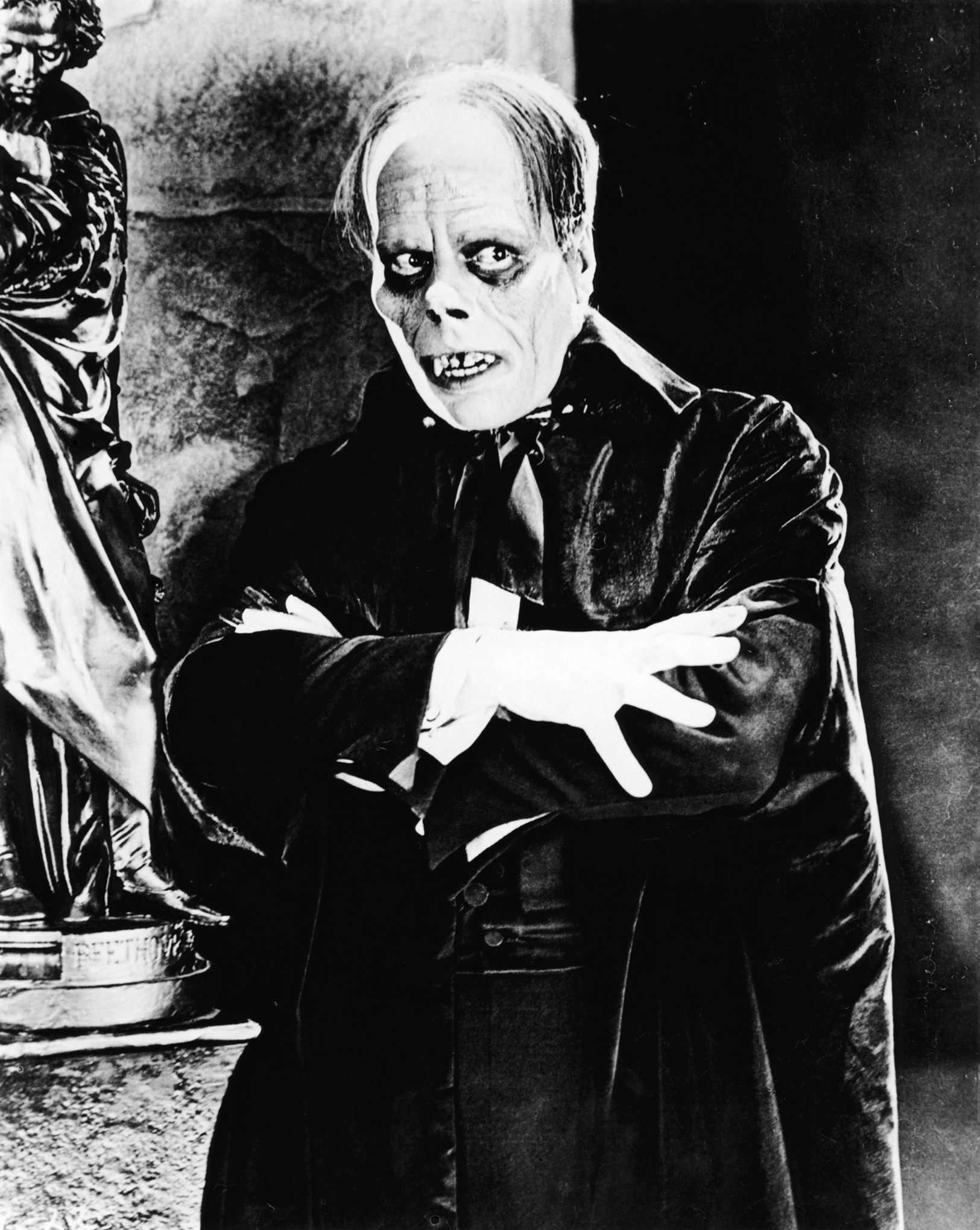
Lon Chaney's version of "Erik" in the 1925 film The Phantom of the Opera had pervasive facial disfigurements, including jagged teeth and sunken-in eyes.

- In most adaptations (literary, stage, film, or otherwise) of The Phantom of the Opera, the title character (known as "Erik" or "The Phantom") wears either a full- or half-face mask to conceal a disfigurement. Some adaptations infer that his disfigurement was present from birth, such as in the Andrew Lloyd Webber musical, whereas others infer or show it to be the result of a horrible accident such as burning from fire or chemicals. The Phantom's disfigured face is usually described as having caused him anguish and despair, thus influencing him to adopt the enigmatic "phantom" persona.
- The DC Comics character the Joker, often a foe of Batman, possesses a clown-like grin and a grotesque combination of bleached skin, red lips, and green hair that are typically described or inferred to be the result of injuries and disfigurement in most media. A common origin of his skin and hair colors revolve around chemical burns as the result of the Joker character either falling into, jumping into, or being thrown into a vat of noxious chemicals. In Tim Burton's 1989 film adaptation of Batman, the Joker character, in this version a criminal originally known as "Jack Napier", receives his distinct rictus grin as the result of a botched plastic surgery that he received after a ricocheted bullet that Napier intended to harm Batman badly injured the Joker's face. In most media, the Joker's mania and insanity begin as a result of him seeing his own disfigurement, the 1989 film being an example.
- Several enemies of fictional British secret agent James Bond have been known for their distinctive facial features. An example is the North Korean criminal and terrorist Zao from the film Die Another Day. Played by Rick Yune, the terrorist has partly translucent skin with thick veins shown on his face and numerous diamonds embedded into his skin.
- The Punisher, an antihero appearing in various Marvel Comics-related works, has confronted several enemies known for their drastic facial disfigurement. A prominent example is Jigsaw, a sadist and psychopath with incredible stamina, while having no superhuman powers that has a deeply mutilated face somewhat similar to a jigsaw puzzle. Perhaps the Punisher's most iconic nemesis, he was played in 2008's Punisher: War Zone by Dominic West.
- Deadpool, an antihero also appearing in Marvel Comics-related works, was disfigured from a healing factor that gives his skin a scarred appearance.
- Nick Cave and the Bad Seeds' popular alternative rock song "Red Right Hand", first released in 1994's Let Love In, describes a nightmarish figure with a blood-red, disfigured hand (as referred to in the title).

== See also ==
- AboutFace – Canadian charitable organization
- Changing Faces (charity) – British charitable organization
- Dermatology
- Face transplant – experimental treatment for severe facial disfigurement
- Corporal punishment, of which disfigurement is the most permanent type
