= Alice Wong (activist) =

American disability rights activist (1974–2025)

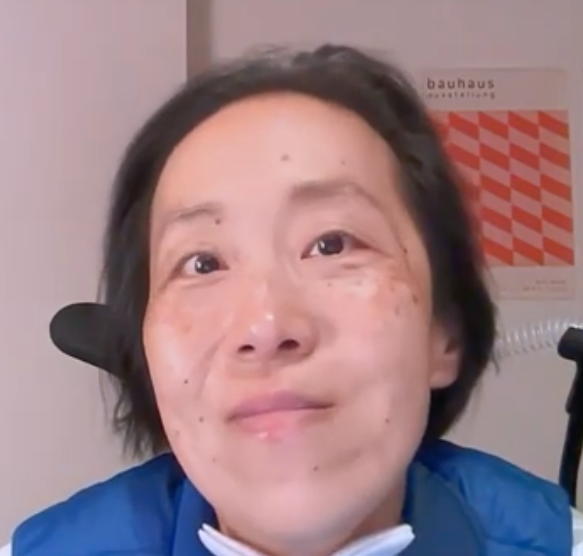
- Accepting a Northern California Book Award in 2023
- Born: March 27, 1974; Indianapolis, Indiana, U.S.
- Died: November 14, 2025 (aged 51); San Francisco, California, U.S.
- Education: Indiana University–Purdue University Indianapolis (BA); University of California, San Francisco (MA)
- Occupations: Activist; writer
- Organization: Disability Visibility Project
- Notable work: Year of the Tiger: An Activist's Life (2022), Disability Visibility: First-Person Stories from the Twenty-First Century (ed., 2020), Disability Intimacy: Essays on Love, Care, and Desire (ed., 2024)
- Awards: MacArthur Fellow

Alice Wong (March 27, 1974 – November 14, 2025) was an American disability rights activist and writer based in San Francisco, California. Dedicated to amplifying the voices and experiences of the disabled community, her career focused on challenging systemic ableism through storytelling, advocacy, and community organizing. A 2024 MacArthur Fellow and 2013 Obama appointee to the National Council on Disability, Wong founded the Disability Visibility Project, an oral history project with StoryCorps. She authored a memoir, Year of the Tiger: An Activist's Life (2022), and edited several collected works on disability, including Disability Visibility: First-Person Stories from the Twenty-First Century (2020) and Disability Intimacy: Essays on Love, Care, and Desire (2024). During the Gaza genocide, she co-founded the "Crips for eSims for Gaza" project which has raised millions of dollars to support internet and phone connectivity for Palestinians in Gaza.

== Early life and education ==
Alice Wong was born March 27, 1974, in the suburbs of Indianapolis, Indiana, to parents Henry and Bobby (Li) Wong who had immigrated to the US from Hong Kong. She had two sisters, Emily and Grace. She was born with spinal muscular atrophy, a neuromuscular disorder. Wong stopped walking at the age of seven or eight.

After graduating from high school, Wong initially enrolled at Earlham College in Indiana, autonomy facilitated by Medicaid support of personal care services; however subsequent cuts to the program as well as an episode of respiratory failure obliged her to transfer so she could return to living with her parents. She graduated from Indiana University–Purdue University Indianapolis with a BA in English and sociology in 1997. She received a master's degree from the University of California, San Francisco, in medical sociology in 2004. After graduating, Wong worked at the University of California, San Francisco as a Staff Research Associate for more than ten years, serving from 2006 to 2009 as the vice chair of the UCSF Chancellor's Advisory Committee on Disability Issues.

== Career and impact ==
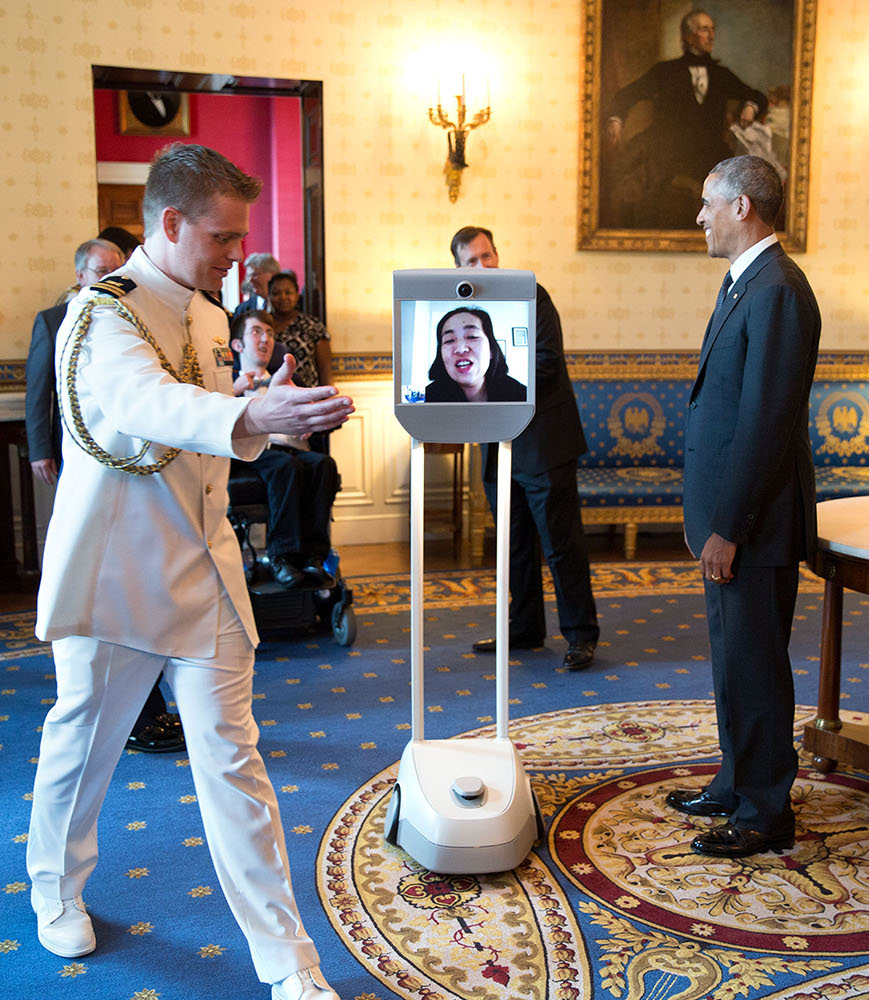
Wong at the White House via robot in 2015

Alice Wong was the founder and Project Coordinator of the Disability Visibility Project (DVP), a project collecting oral histories of people with disabilities in the US that is run in coordination with StoryCorps. The Disability Visibility Project was created in 2014 before the 25th anniversary of the Americans with Disabilities Act of 1990. As of 2018, the project had collected approximately 140 oral histories. The DVP has since expanded to include a podcast, a blog, social media, arts projects, and spaces for connection and community building.

Wong worked the Disabled Writers project, which is funded by a grant from Wong and The Disability Project. Disabled Writers is a resource to help editors connect with disabled writers and journalists. #CripLit, is a series of Twitter chats for disabled writers with novelist Nicola Griffith, and #CripTheVote, a nonpartisan online movement encouraging the political participation of disabled people. She discusses her activism in Narrabase.

Wong served as an advisory board member for Asians and Pacific Islanders with Disabilities of California (APIDC). In 2013, she became an Obama presidential appointee to the National Council on Disability, an independent federal agency which advises the president, Congress, and other federal agencies on disability policies, programs, and practices, where she served until 2015.

In 2015, Wong attended the reception at the White House for the 25th anniversary of the Americans With Disabilities Act via telepresence robot. She was the first person to visit the White House and the President by robot presence.

Wong's work with Long Covid advocacy, including her viral #PodSaveJon campaign, was credited with catalyzing Senator Bernie Sanders to host the first Senate hearing on Long Covid, the first time he had ever mentioned Long Covid publicly.

In 2022, Wong authored a memoir, Year of the Tiger: An Activist's Life. In a Washington Post review, Anna Leahy said that in Wong's writing, "incisive critiques, humor, practicality and optimism become compellingly inseparable." In a review for the Los Angeles Review of Books, Laura Mauldin called Wong "at once brilliant and accessible—a storyteller above all—and a leader who knows she has to say what needs to be said, and then rest."

In December 2023 with Jane Shi and Leah Lakshmi Piepzna-Samarasinha, Wong cofounded Crips for eSims for Gaza, a disabled-led crowdfunding effort raising over three million dollars to support phone and internet access for Palestinians in Gaza during the Gaza genocide amid the Gaza war.

Wong also funded a Long Covid birding club in the San Francisco Bay Area called the Spoonbill Club, started by Pulitzer-Prize winning science writer and Long Covid advocate Ed Yong.

In 2024, Wong founded a journalistic series with The Sick Times, titled The Color of Long Covid, featuring stories from people living with Long Covid.

Wong also played a fictionalized version of herself on the second season of the Netflix adult animated sitcom, Human Resources.

After her death, Making Contact republished work from an episode Wong produced in 2015, titling it "Disability Visibility: Celebrating the Voice of Alice Wong."

== Personal life and death ==
Wong resided with her parents for many years before moving into an apartment of her own in San Francisco, where she lived with her cats Bert and Ernie beginning in 2024.

Wong died of an infection in a San Francisco hospital, on November 14, 2025, at the age of 51. Her final message, shared by her friend Sandy Ho, included reflections on her life and hopes for the future of the disability community, saying she believed it will "light the way". She concluded: "Don't let the bastards grind you down. I love you all."

== Awards ==
For her leadership on behalf of the disability community, Wong received the San Francisco Mayor's Disability Council Beacon Award in 2010, the first-ever UCSF Chancellor's Disability Service Award in 2010, and the 2007 Martin Luther King Jr. Award at her alma mater of UCSF. In 2016, Wong received the 2016 American Association of People with Disabilities Paul G. Hearne Leadership Award, an award for emerging leaders with disabilities who exemplify leadership, advocacy, and dedication to the broader cross-disability community. Wong was selected as a Ford Foundation Disability Futures Fellow in 2020. The same year, Wong was on the list of the BBC's 100 Women announced on November 23, 2020, as well as the Time list of 16 notable people fighting for equality in America. In 2021 Alice Wong won "Best Supporting Actor" at the New Jersey Web Fest for her performance in Someone Dies In This Elevator.

In 2024, Wong was named a MacArthur Fellow.

== Bibliography ==
- 2018: Resistance and Hope: Essays by Disabled People. Ed.
- 2020: Disability Visibility: First-Person Stories from the Twenty-First Century. Knopf Doubleday Publishing Group. Ed.
- 2021: Disability Visibility (Adapted for Young Adults): 17 First-Person Stories for Today. Delacorte Press.
- 2022: Year of The Tiger: An Activist's Life. Vintage.
- 2024: Disability Intimacy: Essays on Love, Care, and Desire. Knopf Doubleday Publishing Group. Ed.
