= Connectedness locus =

In one-dimensional complex dynamics, the connectedness locus of a parameterized family of one-variable holomorphic functions is a subset of the parameter space which consists of those parameters for which the corresponding Julia set is connected.

== Examples ==
Without doubt, the most famous connectedness locus is the Mandelbrot set, which arises from the family of complex quadratic polynomials :

$$f_c(z) = z^2+c\,$$

The connectedness loci of the higher-degree unicritical families,

$$z\mapsto z^d+c\,$$

(where $d\geq 3\,$) are often called 'Multibrot sets'.

For these families, the bifurcation locus is the boundary of the connectedness locus. This is no longer true in settings, such as the full parameter space of cubic polynomials, where there is more than one free critical point. For these families, even maps with disconnected Julia sets may display nontrivial dynamics. Hence here the connectedness locus is generally of less interest.
