= Bifurcation locus =

In complex dynamics, the bifurcation locus of a parameterized family of one-variable holomorphic functions informally is a locus of those parameterized points for which the dynamical behavior changes drastically under a small perturbation of the parameter. Thus the bifurcation locus can be thought of as an analog of the Julia set in parameter space. Without doubt, the most famous example of a bifurcation locus is the boundary of the Mandelbrot set.

Parameters in the complement of the bifurcation locus are called J-stable.

== See also ==
- Connectedness locus
