= Tan Lei =

Mathematician (1963-2016)

Tan Lei 谭蕾
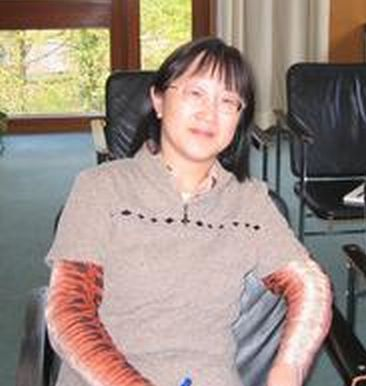
- Tan Lei in Oberwolfach, 2008
- Born: 18 March 1963; Pingxiang, Jiangxi, China
- Died: 1 April 2016 (aged 53)
- Education: Wuhan University (BA); University of Paris-Sud, Orsay (MA); University of Paris-Sud, Orsay (PhD)
- Spouse: Hans Henrik Rugh
- Children: 2
- Scientific career
- Fields: Mathematics
- Thesis: Accouplements des polynômes quadratiques complexes (1986)
- Doctoral advisor: Adrien Douady
- Website: www.math.univ-angers.fr/~tanlei/

Tan Lei (Chinese: 谭蕾; 18 March 1963 – 1 April 2016) was a mathematician specialising in complex dynamics and functions of complex numbers. She is most well-known for her contributions to the study of the Mandelbrot set and Julia set.

== Career ==
After gaining her PhD in Mathematics in 1986 at University of Paris-Sud, Orsay, Tan worked as an assistant researcher in Geneva. She then conducted postdoctoral projects at the Max Planck Institute for Mathematics and University of Bremen until 1989, when she was made a lecturer at Ecole Normale Superieure de Lyon in France. Tan held a research position at University of Warwick from 1995 to 1999, before becoming a senior lecturer at Cergy-Pontoise University. She was made professor at University of Angers in 2009.

== Mathematical work ==
Tan obtained important results about the Julia and Mandelbrot sets, in particular investigating their fractality and the similarities between the two. (Note: Local properties of The Mandelbrot set M, Similarity between M and Julia sets, Proceedings of the seventh European Women in Mathematics (EWM) meeting, Madrid, 1995, S. 71-82.) For example she showed that at the Misiurewicz points these sets are asymptotically similar through scaling and rotation. (Note: Similarity between the Mandelbrot set and Julia Sets, Communications in Mathematical Physics 134 (1990), pp. 587-617.) She constructed examples of polynomials whose Julia sets are homeomorphic to the Sierpiński carpet (Note: A Sierpinski carpet as Julia set, Appendix to: J. Milnor, Geometry and dynamics of quadratic rational maps, Exp. Math., volume 2, 1993, pp. 78-81) and which are disconnected. (Note: With K. Pilgrim: Rational maps with disconnected Julia set, Astérisque, volume 261, 2000, pp. 349-384) She contributed to other areas of complex dynamics. (Note: With G.-Zh. Cui: A characterization of hyperbolic rational maps, Invent. math., Band 183, 2011, S. 451-516.) (Note: With Xavier Buff: The quadratic dynatomic curves are smooth and irreducible, in: Araceli Bonifant, Misha Lyubich, Scott Sutherland (eds.), Frontiers in Complex Dynamics: In Celebration of John Milnor's 80th Birthday, Princeton University Press, 2014, S. 49-72.) She also wrote some surveys and popularisation work around her research topics. (Note: With Xavier Buff and G.-Zh. Cui: Teichmüller spaces and holomorphic dynamics, in: Athanase Papadopoulos (ed.), Handbook of Teichmüller Theory, Volume 4, EMS 2014) (Note: With Arnaud Chéritat: Si nous faisons danser les racines? Un hommage à Bill Thurston, Images des mathématiques CNRS, 7 Nov. 2012)

== Legacy ==
A conference in Tan's memory was held in Beijing, China, in May 2016.

== Publications ==
=== Thesis ===
- Tan, Lei (1986). Accouplements des polynômes quadratiques complexes. Comptes Rendus de l'Académie des Sciences (PhD). Vol. 302. Paris.

=== Books ===
- Tan, Lei, ed. (2000). The Mandelbrot Set, Theme and Variations. London Mathematical Society Lecture Note Series. Vol. 274. Cambridge: Cambridge University Press. ISBN 9780521774765.
