= Misiurewicz point =

Parameter in the Mandelbrot set

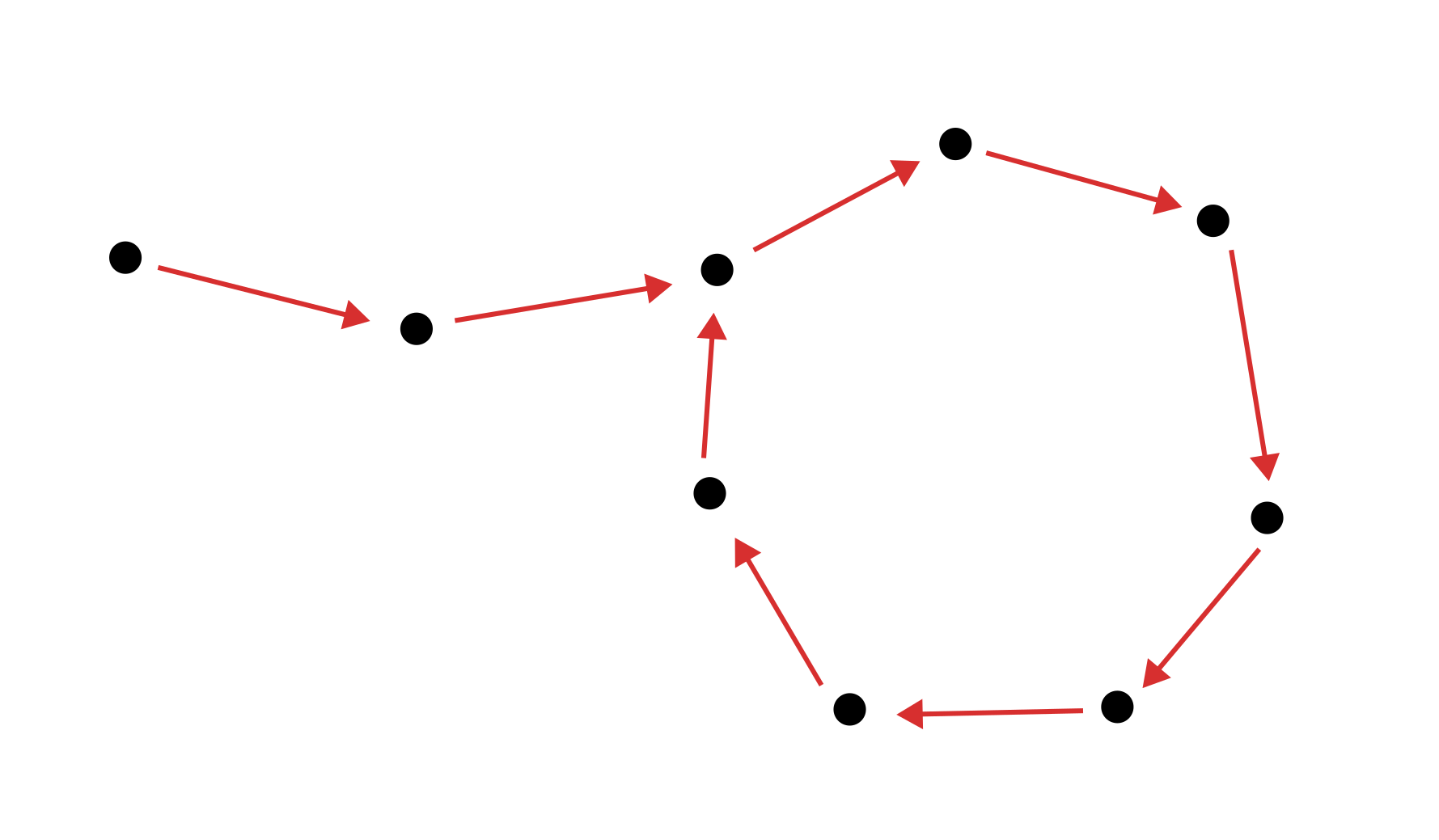
A preperiodic orbit.

In mathematics, a Misiurewicz point is a parameter value in the Mandelbrot set (the parameter space of complex quadratic maps) and also in real quadratic maps of the interval for which the critical point is strictly pre-periodic (i.e., it becomes periodic after finitely many iterations but is not periodic itself). By analogy, the term Misiurewicz point is also used for parameters in a multibrot set where the unique critical point is strictly pre-periodic. This term makes less sense for maps in greater generality that have more than one free critical point because some critical points might be periodic and others not. These points are named after the Polish-American mathematician Michał Misiurewicz, who was the first to study them.

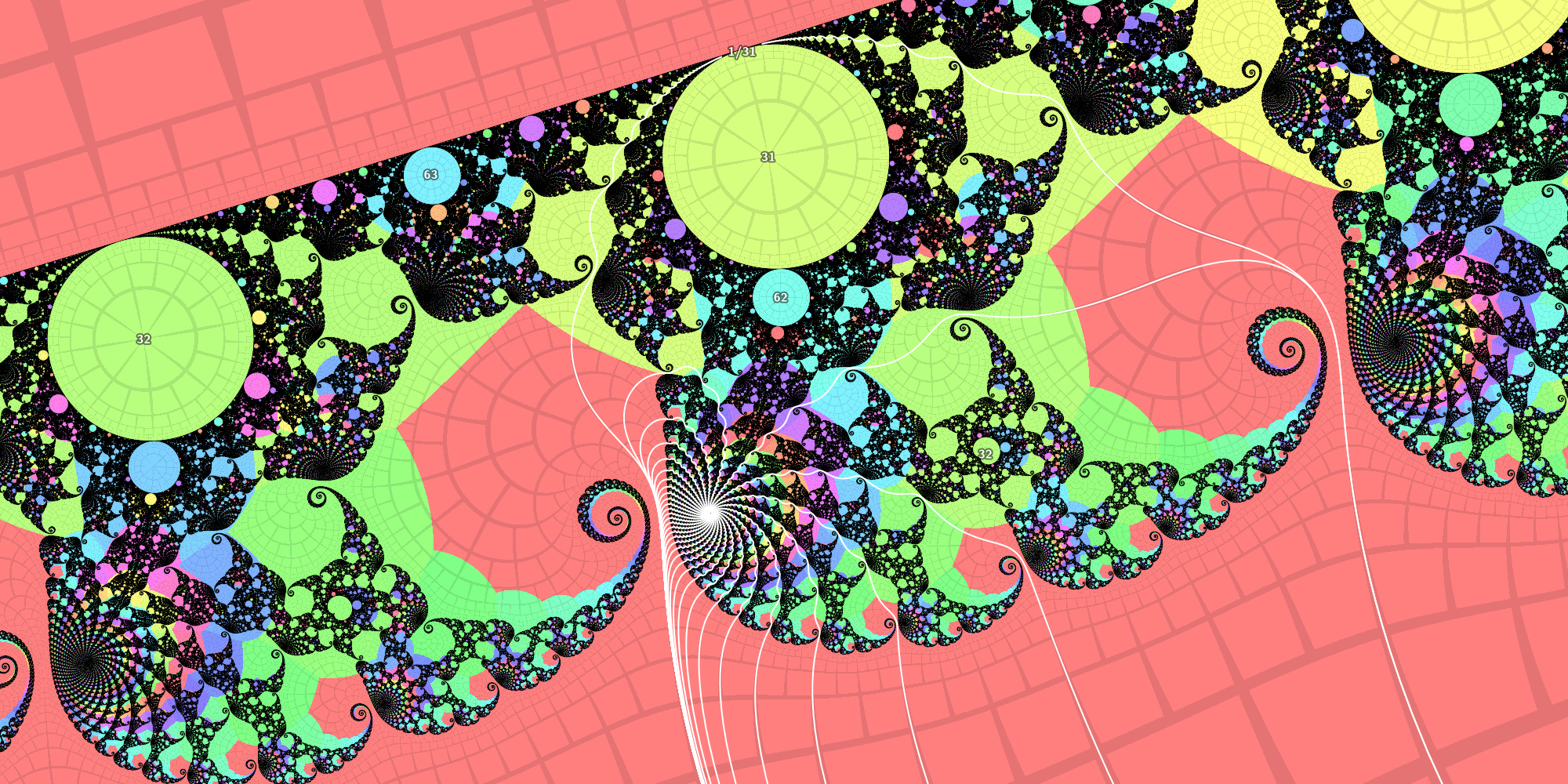
Principal Misiurewicz point of the wake 1/31

== Mathematical notation ==
A parameter $c$ is a Misiurewicz point $M_{k,n}$ if it satisfies the equations:

$$f_c^{(k)}(z_{cr}) = f_c^{(k+n)}(z_{cr})$$

and:

$$f_c^{(k-1)}(z_{cr}) \neq f_c^{(k+n-1)}(z_{cr})$$

so:

$$M_{k,n} = c : f_c^{(k)}(z_{cr}) = f_c^{(k+n)}(z_{cr})$$

where:

- $z_{cr}$ is a critical point of $f_c$,
- $k$ and $n$ are positive integers,
- $f_c^{(k)}$ denotes the $k$-th iterate of $f_c$.

== Name ==
The term "Misiurewicz point" is used ambiguously: Misiurewicz originally investigated maps in which all critical points were non-recurrent; that is, in which there exists a neighbourhood for every critical point that is not visited by the orbit of this critical point. This meaning is firmly established in the context of the dynamics of iterated interval maps. Only in very special cases does a quadratic polynomial have a strictly periodic and unique critical point. In this restricted sense, the term is used in complex dynamics; a more appropriate one would be Misiurewicz–Thurston points (after William Thurston, who investigated post-critically finite rational maps).

== Quadratic maps ==
A complex quadratic polynomial has only one critical point. By a suitable conjugation any quadratic polynomial can be transformed into a map of the form $P_c(z)=z^2+c$ which has a single critical point at $z = 0$. The Misiurewicz points of this family of maps are roots of the equations:

$$P_c^{(k)}(0) = P_c^{(k+n)}(0),$$

Subject to the condition that the critical point is not periodic, where:

- k is the pre-period
- n is the period
- $P_c^{(n)} = P_c ( P_c^{(n-1)})$ denotes the n-fold composition of $P_c(z)= z^2+c$ with itself i.e. the n^{th} iteration of $P_c$.

For example, the Misiurewicz points with k= 2 and n= 1, denoted by M_{2,1}, are roots of:

$$\begin{align}
& P_c^{(2)}(0) = P_c^{(3)}(0)\\
\Rightarrow {} & c^2+c = (c^2+c)^2+c \\
\Rightarrow {} & c^4+2c^3 = 0.
\end{align}$$

The root c= 0 is not a Misiurewicz point because the critical point is a fixed point when c= 0, and so is periodic rather than pre-periodic. This leaves a single Misiurewicz point M_{2,1} at c = −2.

=== Properties of Misiurewicz points of complex quadratic mapping ===
Misiurewicz points belong to, and are dense in, the boundary of the Mandelbrot set.

If $c$ is a Misiurewicz point, then the associated filled Julia set is equal to the Julia set and means the filled Julia set has no interior.

If $c$ is a Misiurewicz point, then in the corresponding Julia set all periodic cycles are repelling (in particular the cycle that the critical orbit falls onto).

The Mandelbrot set and Julia set $J_c$ are locally asymptotically self-similar around Misiurewicz points.

==== Types ====
Misiurewicz points in the context of the Mandelbrot set can be classified based on several criteria. One such criterion is the number of external rays that converge on such a point. Branch points, which can divide the Mandelbrot set into two or more sub-regions, have three or more external arguments (or angles). Non-branch points have exactly two external rays (these correspond to points lying on arcs within the Mandelbrot set). These non-branch points are generally more subtle and challenging to identify in visual representations. End points, or branch tips, have only one external ray converging on them. Another criterion for classifying Misiurewicz points is their appearance within a plot of a subset of the Mandelbrot set. Misiurewicz points can be found at the centers of spirals as well as at points where two or more branches meet. According to the Branch Theorem of the Mandelbrot set, all branch points of the Mandelbrot set are Misiurewicz points.

Most Misiurewicz parameters within the Mandelbrot set exhibit a "center of a spiral". This occurs due to the behavior at a Misiurewicz parameter where the critical value jumps onto a repelling periodic cycle after a finite number of iterations. At each point during the cycle, the Julia set exhibits asymptotic self-similarity through complex multiplication by the derivative of this cycle. If the derivative is non-real, it implies that the Julia set near the periodic cycle has a spiral structure. Consequently, a similar spiral structure occurs in the Julia set near the critical value, and by Tan Lei's theorem, also in the Mandelbrot set near any Misiurewicz parameter for which the repelling orbit has a non-real multiplier. The visibility of the spiral shape depends on the value of this multiplier. The number of arms in the spiral corresponds to the number of branches at the Misiurewicz parameter, which in turn equals the number of branches at the critical value in the Julia set. Even the principal Misiurewicz point $M_{4,1}$ in the 1/3-limb, located at the end of the parameter rays at angles 9/56, 11/56, and 15/56, is asymptotically a spiral with infinitely many turns, although this is difficult to discern without magnification.

==== External arguments ====
External arguments of Misiurewicz points, measured in turns are:

- Rational numbers
- Proper fractions with an even denominator
  - Dyadic fractions with denominator $= 2^b$ and finite (terminating) expansion:
    $$\frac{1}{2}_{10} = 0.5_{10} = 0.1_2$$
  - Fractions with a denominator $= a \cdot 2^b; a, b \in \mathbb{N}; 2 \nmid b$ and repeating expansion:
    $$\frac{1}{6}_{10} = {\frac{1}{2 \times 3}}_{10}=0.16666..._{10} = 0.0(01)..._2.$$

The subscript number in each of these expressions is the base of the numeral system being used.

=== Examples of Misiurewicz points of complex quadratic mapping ===
==== End points ====
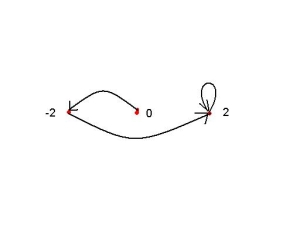
Orbit of critical point $z =0$ under $f_{-2}$

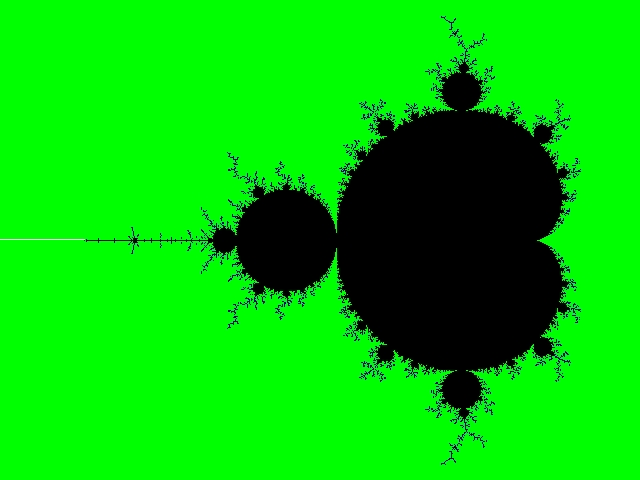
$c = M_{2,1}$

Point $c = M_{2,1} = -2$ is considered an end point as it is the tip of the main antenna of the Mandelbrot set. and the landing point of only one external ray (parameter ray) of angle 1/2. It is also considered an end point because its critical orbit is $\{ 0 , -2, 2, 2, 2, ... \}$, following the Symbolic sequence = C L R R R ... with a pre-period of 2 and period of 1.

Point $c = M_{2,2} = i$ is considered an end point as it is the tip of one of two main branches of the 1/3 limb, and the landing point of the external ray for the angle 1/6. Its critical orbit is $\{0, i, i-1, -i, i-1, -i...\}$.

Point $c = -0.228155493653962... + i \, 1.115142508039937... = M_{3,1}$ is the tip of the other main branch of the 1/3 limb. Like all other end points, it is the landing point of only one external ray. It has a pre-period of 3 and a period of 1.

==== Branch points ====
Zoom around principal Misiurewicz point for periods from 2 to 1024

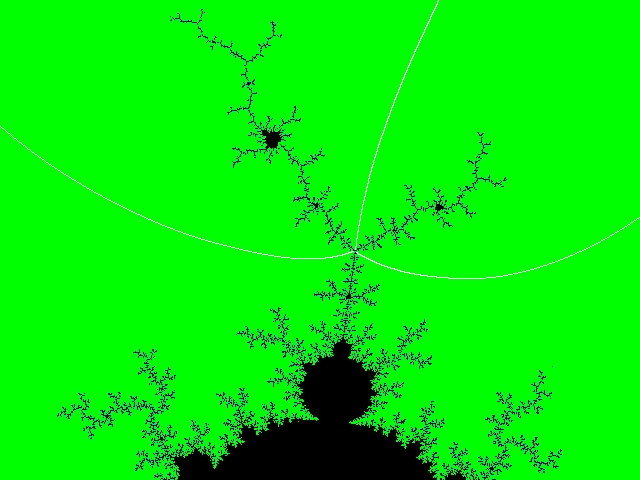
$c = M_{4,1}$

Point $c = -0.10109636384562... + i \, 0.95628651080914... = M_{4,1}$ is considered a branch point because it is a principal Misiurewicz point of the 1/3 limb and is the landing point of 3 external rays: 9/56, 11/56 and 15/56. It has a pre-period of 4 and a period of 1.

==== Other points ====
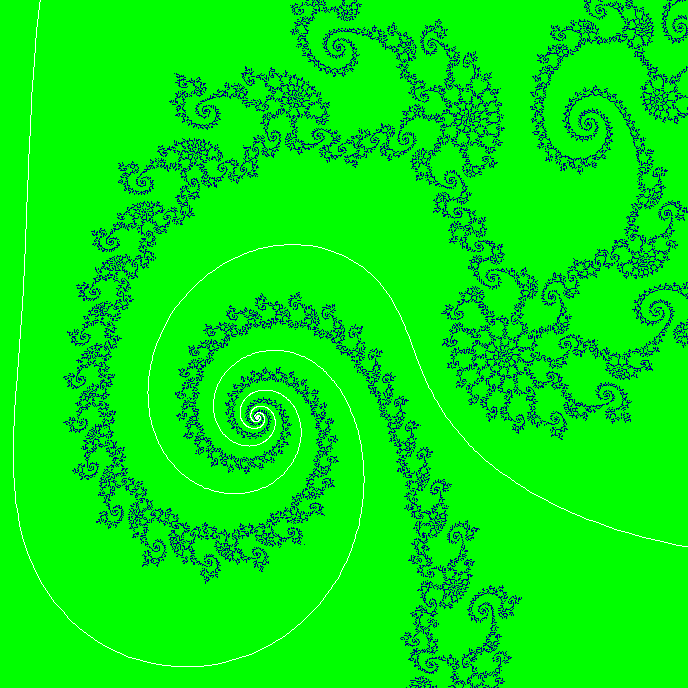
$c = M_{23,2}$

Point $c = -1.54368901269208... = M_{3,1}$ is a principal Misiurewicz point of the main antenna of the Mandelbrot set. It is the landing point for two external rays: $\frac{5}{12}$, $\frac{7}{12}$, and has pre-period $k = 3$ and period $n = 1$.

Point $c = -0.77568377... + i \, 0.13646737... = M_{23,2}$ may be recognized as the center of a two-arms spiral located in the so-called "Seahorse Valley" of the Mandelbrot set. It is the landing point of 2 external rays with angles: $\frac{8388611}{25165824}$ and $\frac{8388613}{25165824}$ where the denominator is $3*2^{23}$, and has pre-period $k = 23$ and period $n = 2$.

== See also ==
- Arithmetic dynamics
- Feigenbaum point
- Dendrite (mathematics)
