= Leconte Prize =

French prize for discoveries in science

The Leconte Prize (French: Prix Leconte) is a prize created in 1886 by the French Academy of Sciences to recognize important discoveries in mathematics, physics, chemistry, natural history or medicine. In recent years the prize has been awarded in the specific categories of mathematics, physics, and biology. Scientists and mathematicians of all nationalities are eligible for the award. The value of the award in the late 19th and early 20th century was F50,000 (at the time equivalent to £2,000, or US$10,000), about five times as much as the annual salary of the average professor in France. The award was F22,000 (Note: The new Franc, introduced in 1960, was worth 100 old Francs.) in 1984, F20,000 in 2001, €3,000 in 2008, €2,500 in 2010, €2,000 in 2014, and €1,500 in 2019.

The Leconte Prize was established with a donation from a businessman, Victor Eugene Leconte, to the academy. The donation specified that a F50,000 prize would be awarded every three years for outstanding past work, and that up to 1/8th of the interest earned by the fund each year could be awarded as encouragements, i.e., support for ongoing and future research. The academy did not award any large (F50,000) prizes between 1905 and 1916, but did award a total of F30,000 in encouragements during that period.

== Recipients ==
| Year | Recipient | Field | Amount | Notes |
|---|---|---|---|---|
| 1889 | Paul Marie Eugène Vieille | Mechanics | | |
| 1891 | M. Douliot | | | Encouragement award. |
| 1892 | Philbert Maurice d'Ocagne | Mathematics | | |
| 1892 | Jean Antoine Villemin | Medicine | F50,000 | Posthumously. |
| 1895 | William Ramsay and John Strutt, 3rd Baron Rayleigh | Physics | F50,000 | |
| 1898 | no award | | | |
| 1901 | Fernand Foureau | Exploration | | |
| 1904 | Prosper-René Blondlot | Physics | F50,000 | |
| 1907 | no award | | | |
| 1909 | Walter Ritz | Physics | F2,000 | Encouragement award. |
| 1910 | Arthur Robert Hinks | Astronomy | | Encouragement award. |
| 1911 | no award | | | |
| 1912 | Charles Tellier | | F8,000 | Encouragement award. |
| 1912 | M. Forest | | F12,000 | Encouragement award. |
| 1915 | Almroth Wright | Medicine | | Encouragement award. |
| 1921 | Georges Claude | Mechanics | F50,000 | |
| 1924 | André-Louis Debierne | Chemistry | | |
| 1927 | Alexandre Yersin | Medicine | | |
| 1930 | Élie Cartan | Mathematics | | |
| 1936 | Julien Constantin | | | Posthumously. "For the whole of his work." |
| 1955 | Lucien Bull | Mechanics | | |
| 1960 | Marguerite Perey | Physics | | |
| 1975 | Pierre Buser | Medicine | | |
| 1978 | Marcel Berger | Mathematics | | |
| 1984 | Michel Duflo and Luc Tartar | Mathematics | F22,000 | |
| 1993 | Georg Maret | Physics | | |
| 1996 | Sergiu Klainerman | Mathematics | | |
| 1997 | Raoul Ranjeva | Biology | | |
| 1998 | Philippe Biane | Mathematics | | |
| 1999 | Hervé Nifenecker | Physics | | |
| 2001 | Thierry Gaude | Biology | F20,000 | |
| 2002 | Christian Gérard | Mathematics | | |
| 2004 | Rémi Monasson | Physics | | |
| 2006 | Arnaud Cheritat and Xavier Buff | Mathematics | | |
| 2007 | Alain Pugin | Biology | | |
| 2008 | Marie-Noëlle Bussac | Physics | €3,000 | |
| 2010 | David Lannes | Mathematics | €2,500 | |
| 2011 | Olivier Loudet | Biology | €2,500 | |
| 2012 | Laurent Sanchez-Palencia | Physics | €2,500 | |
| 2013 | Zoé Chatzidakis | Mathematics | | |
| 2014 | Teva Vernoux | Biology | €2,000 | |
| 2015 | Jean-Claude Garreau | Physics | €2,000 | |
| 2017 | Nikolay Tzvetkov | Mathematics | | |
| 2019 | Michaël Le Bars | Physics | €1,500 | |
| 2020 | Phillipe Eyssidieux, Vincent Guedj and Ahmed Zeriahi | Mathematics | €1,500 | |
| 2021 | Emmanuelle Bayer | Biology | €1,500 | |

== See also ==
- List of biology awards
- List of mathematics awards
- List of physics awards
