= Barbara Hubbard =

Barbara Hubbard may refer to:

- Barbara Marx Hubbard (1929–2019), American futurist, author, and public speaker
- Barbara Burke Hubbard (born 1948), American science journalist, mathematics popularizer, and author
- Barbara Follett (politician) (born 1942), née Hubbard, British politician
