= Arnaud Chéritat =

French mathematician (born 1975)

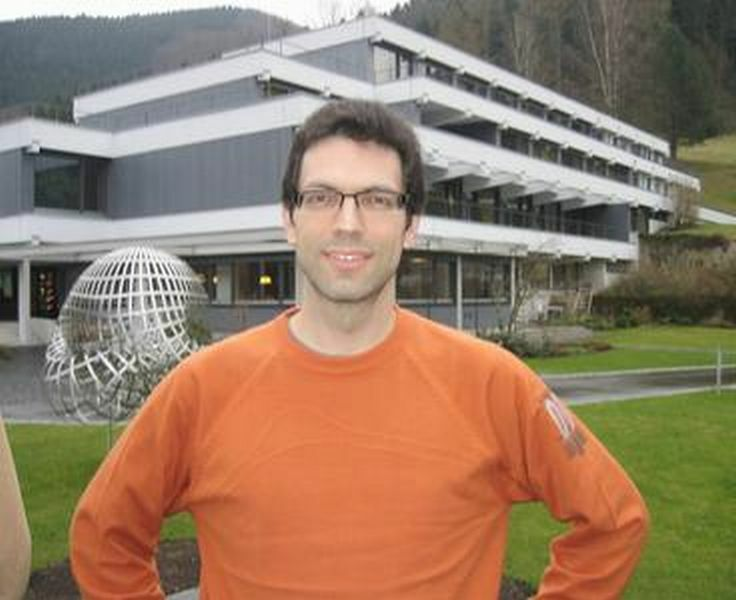
- Born: June 7, 1975 (age 51)

Academic work
- Discipline: Mathematics

Arnaud Chéritat (born June 7, 1975) is a French mathematician who works as a director of research at the Institut de Mathématiques de Toulouse. His research concerns complex dynamics and the shape of Julia sets.

Chéritat earned a licenciate in mathematics in 1995 from the École Normale Supérieure, a diplôme d'études approfondies in pure mathematics in 1996 from the University of Paris-Sud, and a master's degree in pure and applied mathematics and informatics in 1998 from the École Normale Supérieure. He defended his doctoral thesis in 2001 from the University of Paris-Sud, under the supervision of Adrien Douady, and completed his habilitation in 2008 from the University of Toulouse. He worked as a maître de conférences at the University of Toulouse from 2002 until 2007, when he moved to the Institut de Mathématiques de Toulouse.

In 2006, Chéritat won the Leconte Prize of the French Academy of Sciences. He was an invited speaker at the International Congress of Mathematicians in 2010. In 2012, he became one of the inaugural fellows of the American Mathematical Society.

== Selected publications ==
- with Artur Avila and Xavier Buff: Avila, Artur; Buff, Xavier; Chéritat, Arnaud (2004). "Siegel disks with smooth boundaries". Acta Mathematica. 193 (1): 1–30. doi:10.1007/BF02392549.
- with Xavier Buff: Buff, Xavier; Chéritat, Arnaud (2004). "Upper bound for the size of quadratic Siegel disks". Inventiones Mathematicae. 156 (1): 1–24. Bibcode:2004InMat.156....1B. doi:10.1007/s00222-003-0331-6. S2CID 41612832.
- with Xavier Buff: Buff, Xavier; Chéritat, Arnaud (2006). "The Brjuno function continuously estimates the size of quadratic Siegel disks". Annals of Mathematics. 164 (1): 265–312. arXiv:math/0401044. doi:10.4007/annals.2006.164.265. JSTOR 20159990. S2CID 55781012.
