= John H. Hubbard =

American mathematician

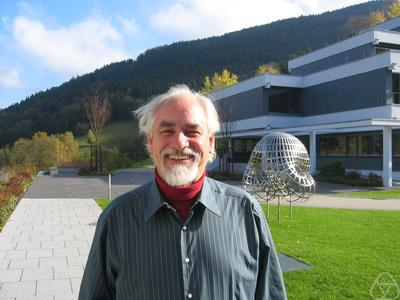
- Hubbard in 2011
- Born: October 6, 1945 (age 80)
- Education: Université de Paris-Sud (Dr.E.); Harvard University (B.S.)
- Scientific career
- Workplaces: Cornell University (current), Harvard University
- Thesis: Sur Les Sections Analytiques de La Courbe Universelle de Teichmüller (1973)
- Doctoral advisor: Adrien Douady
- Doctoral students: Sarah Koch
- Website: pi.math.cornell.edu/~hubbard/

John Hamal Hubbard (born October 6 or 7, 1945) is an American mathematician and professor at Cornell University and the Université de Provence. He is known for the mathematical contributions he made with Adrien Douady in the field of complex dynamics, including a study of the Mandelbrot set. One of their most important results is that the Mandelbrot set is connected.

== Education ==
Hubbard graduated with a Doctorat d'État from Université de Paris-Sud in 1973 under the direction of Adrien Douady; his thesis was entitled Sur Les Sections Analytiques de La Courbe Universelle de Teichmüller and was published by the American Mathematical Society.

== Writing ==
Hubbard and his wife Barbara Burke Hubbard wrote the book Vector Calculus, Linear Algebra, and Differential Forms: A Unified Approach.

He has also published three volumes of a book on Teichmüller theory and its applications to four revolutionary theorems of William Thurston.

== Personal life ==
Hubbard is married to Barbara Burke Hubbard, a science writer. Together they have a son and three younger daughters.
