= Sarah Koch =

American mathematician (born 1979)

Sarah Colleen Koch
- Born: 1979 (age 46–47)
- Education: Cornell University & University of Provence (Ph.D.); Rensselaer Polytechnic Institute
- Scientific career
- Fields: Mathematics
- Workplaces: University of Michigan (2013–); Harvard University (2010–2013)
- Thesis: A New Link between Teichmüller Theory and Complex Dynamics (2008)
- Doctoral advisor: John H. Hubbard
- Other academic advisors: Curtis T. McMullen

Sarah Colleen Koch (born 1979) is an American mathematician, the Arthur F. Thurnau Professor of Mathematics at the University of Michigan. Her research interests include complex analysis, complex dynamics, and Teichmüller theory.

== Education and career ==
Koch was born and educated in Concord, New Hampshire, with summers in Wilmington, Vermont. She went to the Rensselaer Polytechnic Institute, initially studying chemistry but soon switching to mathematics; she graduated in 2001. Next, she went to Cornell University for graduate study in mathematics, earning a master's degree in 2005, and completed her studies with a double Ph.D., supervised by John H. Hubbard: a doctorate from the University of Provence in 2007 with the dissertation La Théorie de Teichmüller et ses applications aux endomorphismes de $\mathbb{P}^n$, and a doctorate from Cornell in 2008 with the dissertation A New Link between Teichmüller Theory and Complex Dynamics.

She became a postdoctoral researcher as a National Science Foundation postdoctoral fellow at the University of Warwick and Harvard University; at Harvard, her postdoctoral mentor was Curtis T. McMullen. She stayed at Harvard as Benjamin Peirce Assistant Professor from 2010 to 2013. She moved to the University of Michigan in 2013, became an associate professor in 2016, and was promoted to full professor in 2021, at the same time being named as the Arthur F. Thurnau Professor.

== Recognition ==
The University of Michigan gave Koch the 2016 Class of 1923 Memorial Teaching Award in 2016 and the 2020 Harold R. Johnson Diversity Service Award.

Koch was the recipient of the 2021 Distinguished University Teaching of Mathematics Award of the Michigan Section of the Mathematical Association of America. She was a 2023 recipient of one of the Deborah and Franklin Haimo Awards for Distinguished College or University Teaching of Mathematics, recognizing her classroom teaching, her support of mathematics students from underrepresented groups, and her efforts to bring mathematics to middle schoolers from underserved African-American communities in Ypsilanti, Michigan.
