= Autofrettage =

Process to increase pressure-carrying capacity

Autofrettage is a work-hardening process in which a thick-walled pressure vessel is subjected to enormous pressure, causing internal portions of the part to yield plastically, resulting in internal compressive residual stresses once the pressure is released.

== Overview ==
The goal of autofrettage is to increase the pressure-carrying capacity of the final product. Inducing residual compressive stresses into materials can also increase their resistance to stress corrosion cracking; that is, non-mechanically-assisted cracking that occurs when a material is placed in a corrosive environment in the presence of tensile stress. The technique is commonly used in manufacture of high-pressure pump cylinders, warship and gun barrels, and fuel-injection systems for diesel engines. Due to work hardening, it also enhances wear life of the barrel marginally. While autofrettage will induce some work hardening, that is not the primary mechanism of strengthening.

The tube (a) is subjected to internal pressure past its elastic limit (b), leaving an inner layer of compressively stressed metal (c).

The start point is a single steel tube of internal diameter slightly less than the desired calibre. The tube is subjected to internal pressure of sufficient magnitude to enlarge the bore; in the process, the inner layers of the metal are stretched in tension beyond their elastic limit. This means that the inner layers have been stretched to a point where the steel is no longer able to return to its original shape once the internal pressure has been removed. Although the outer layers of the tube are also stretched, the degree of internal pressure applied during the process is such that they are not stretched beyond their elastic limit. The reason why this is possible is that the stress distribution through the walls of the tube is non-uniform. Its maximum value occurs in the metal adjacent to the source of pressure, decreasing markedly towards the outer layers of the tube. The strain is proportional to the stress applied within the elastic limit; therefore, the expansion at the outer layers is less than at the bore. Because the outer layers remain elastic, they attempt to return to their original shape; however, they are prevented from doing so completely by the now-permanently-stretched inner layers. The effect is that the inner layers of the metal are put under compression by the outer layers in much the same way as though an outer layer of metal had been shrunk on as with a built-up gun. This can be better understood by imagining the thick-walled tube as a multilayer tube.

The next step is to subject the compressively strained inner layers to a low-temperature treatment (LTT) which results in the elastic limit being raised to at least the autofrettage pressure employed in the first stage of the process. Finally, the elasticity of the barrel can be tested by applying internal pressure once more, but this time care is taken to ensure that the inner layers are not stretched beyond their new elastic limit. The end result is an inner surface of the gun barrel with a residual compressive stress able to counterbalance the tensile stress induced when the gun is discharged. In addition, the material has a higher tensile strength due to work hardening.

== History ==
Early in the history of artillery, people observed that, after firing a small number of rounds, the bore of a new gun slightly enlarges and hardens. Historically, the first type of autofrettage (before the process was recognized as such) was mandrelling bronze gun barrels, invented and patented in 1869 by Samuel B. Dean of the South Boston Iron Company. But it found no use on the American continent and was copied without a license by Franz von Uchatius in mid-1870s. It found some use in several European countries lacking steel industry, but was quickly displaced by cast steel everywhere except Austro-Hungary, which stuck to the obsolete technology until WWI and therefore had their artillery handicapped.

The problem of strengthening steel gun barrels using the same principle was tackled by French colonial artillery colonel Louis Frédéric Gustave Jacob, who suggested in 1907 to pressurize them hydraulically and coined the term "autofrettage". In 1913, Schneider-Creusot made a 14 cm L/50 naval gun by such a method and applied for a patent. However, implementing such a technique on an industrial scale required numerical methods to approximate the solutions of transcedental equations of plastic deformation, which were developed in France during WWI by math professor Maurice d'Ocagne and Schneider engineer Louis Potin.

In modern practice, a slightly oversized die is pushed slowly through the barrel by a hydraulic ram. The amount of initial underbore and oversize of the die are calculated to strain the material around the bore past its elastic limit into plastic deformation. A residual compressive stress remains on the barrel's inner surface, even after final honing and rifling.

The technique has been applied to the expansion of tubular components down-hole in oil and gas wells. The method has been patented by the Norwegian oil service company Meta, which uses it to connect concentric tubular components with sealing and strength properties outlined above.

The term autofrettage is also used to describe a step in manufacturing of composite overwrapped pressure vessel where the liner is expanded (by plastic deformation), inside the composite overwrap.

== See also ==
- Shot peening, which also induces compressive residual stresses
- Built-up gun, an older method for strengthening gun barrels
