= Douady rabbit =

Fractal related to the mandelbrot set

A Douady rabbit is a fractal derived from the Julia set of the function $f_c(z) = z^2+c$, when parameter $c$ is near the center of one of the period three bulbs of the Mandelbrot set for a complex quadratic map.

It is named after French mathematician Adrien Douady.

An example of a Douady rabbit. The colors show the number of iterations required to escape.

== Background ==
The Douady rabbit is generated by iterating the Mandelbrot set map $z_{n+1}=z_n^2+c$ on the complex plane, where parameter $c$ is fixed to lie in one of the two period three bulb off the main cardioid and $z$ ranging over the plane. The resulting image can be colored by corresponding each pixel with a starting value $z_0$ and calculating the amount of iterations required before the value of $z_n$ escapes a bounded region, after which it will diverge toward infinity.

It can also be described using the logistic map form of the complex quadratic map, specifically

$$z_{n+1} = \mathcal M z_n := \gamma z_n \left(1 - z_n\right).$$

which is equivalent to

$w_{n+1}=w_n^2+c$.

Irrespective of the specific iteration used, the filled Julia set associated with a given value of $\gamma$ (or $\mu$) consists of all starting points $z_0$ (or $w_0$) for which the iteration remains bounded. Then, the Mandelbrot set consists of those values of $\gamma$ (or $\mu$) for which the associated filled Julia set is connected. The Mandelbrot set can be viewed with respect to either $\gamma$ or $\mu$.

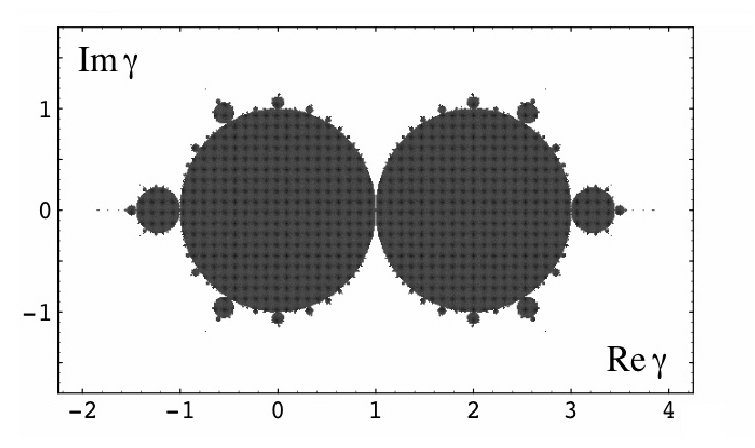
The Mandelbrot set in the $\gamma$ plane

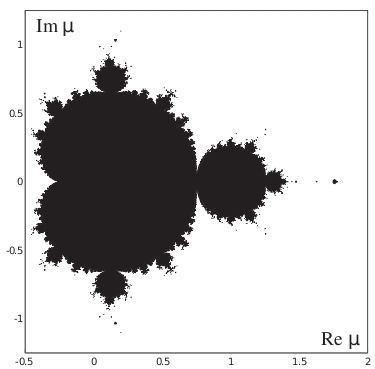
The Mandelbrot set in the $\mu$ plane

Noting that $\mu$ is invariant under the substitution $\gamma \to 2 - \gamma$, the Mandelbrot set with respect to $\gamma$ has additional horizontal symmetry. Since $z$ and $w$ are affine transformations of one another, or more specifically a similarity transformation, consisting of only scaling, rotation and translation, the filled Julia sets look similar for either form of the iteration given above.

== Detailed description ==
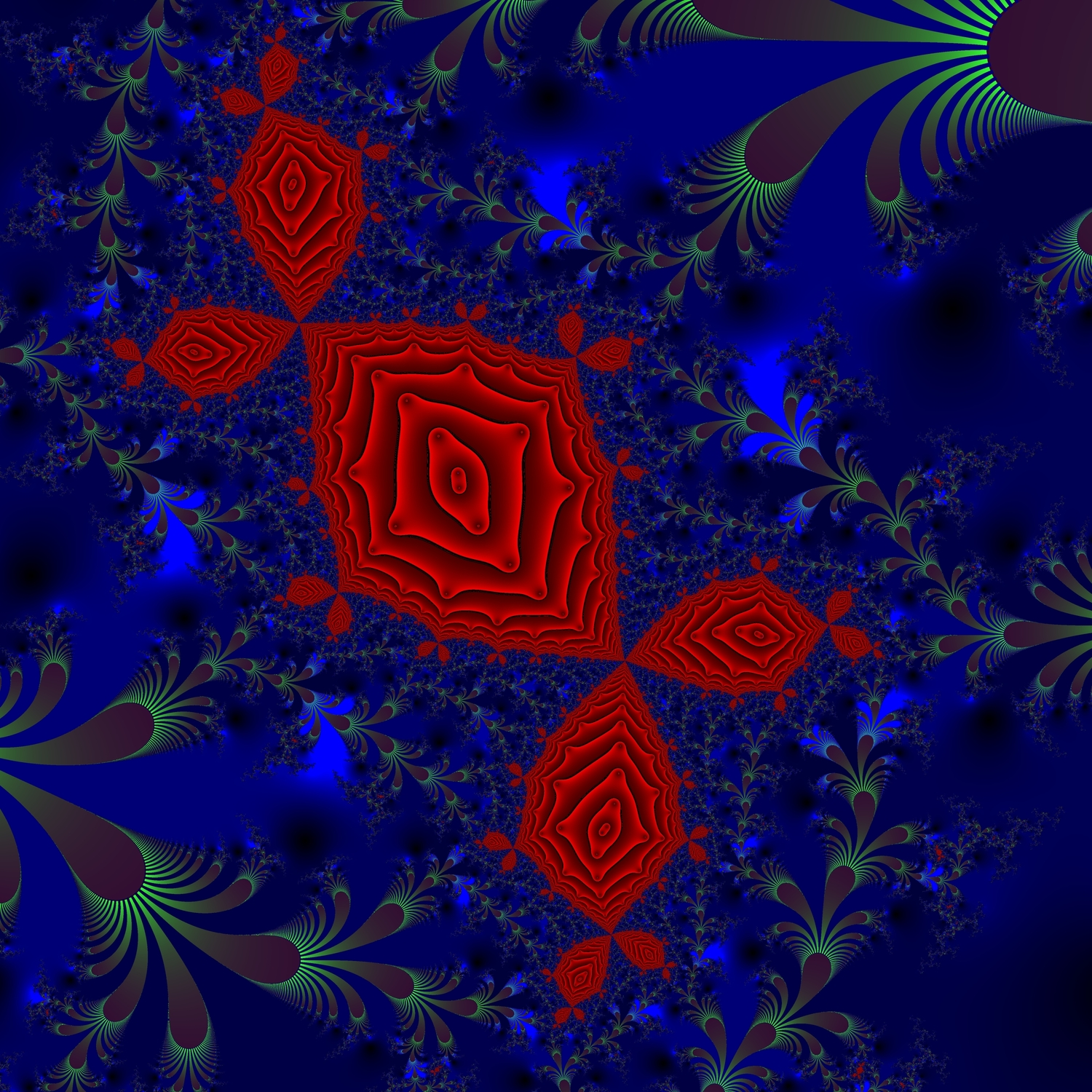
Douady rabbit in an exponential family

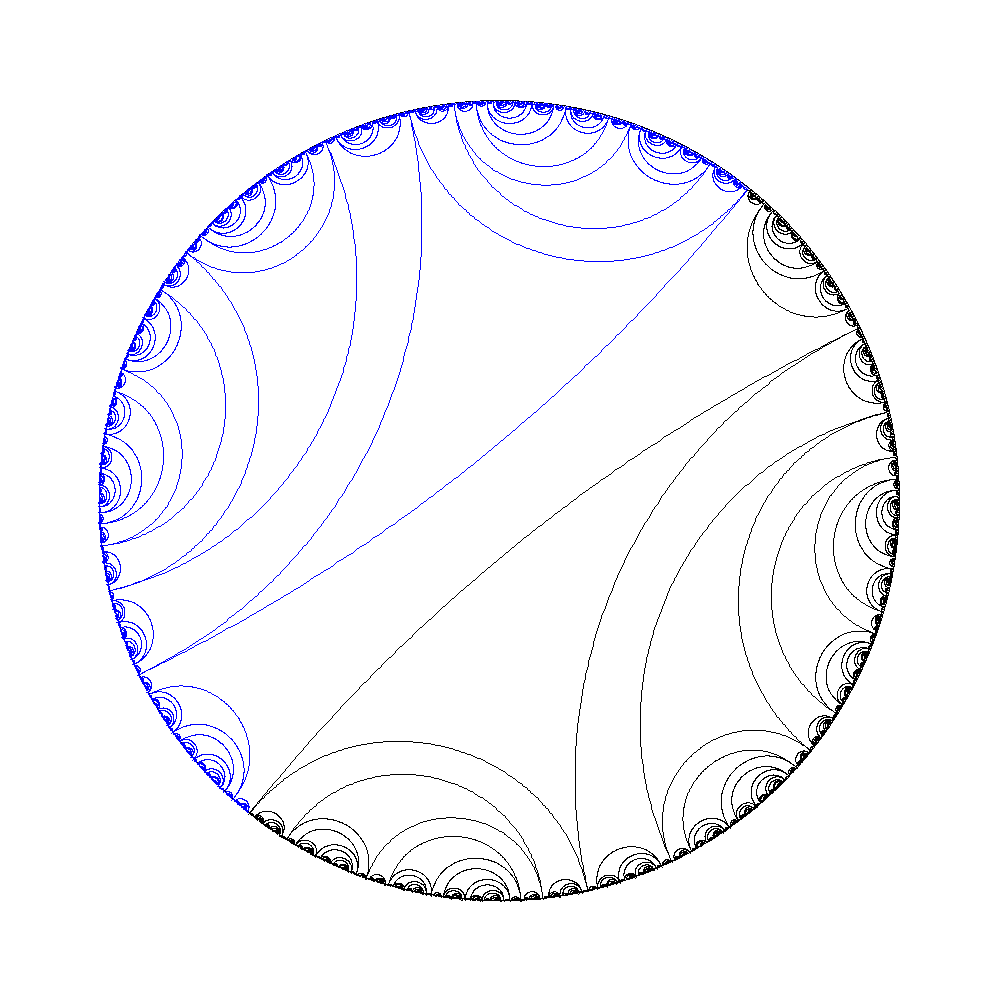
Lamination of the rabbit Julia set

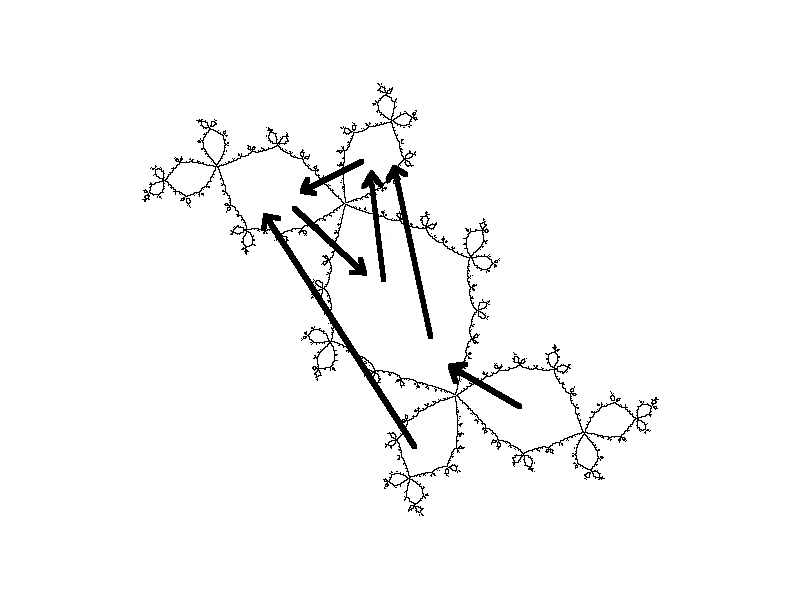
Representation of the dynamics inside the rabbit

You can also describe the Douady rabbit utilising the Mandelbrot set with respect to $\gamma$ as shown in the graph above. In this figure, the Mandelbrot set superficially appears as two back-to-back unit disks with sprouts or buds, such as the sprouts at the one- and five-o'clock positions on the right disk or the sprouts at the seven- and eleven-o'clock positions on the left disk. When $\gamma$ is within one of these four sprouts, the associated filled Julia set in the mapping plane is said to be a Douady rabbit. For these values of $\gamma$, it can be shown that $\mathcal M$ has $z=0$ and one other point as unstable (repelling) fixed points, and $z=\infty$ as an attracting fixed point. Moreover, the map ${\mathcal{M}}^3$ has three attracting fixed points. A Douady rabbit consists of the three attracting fixed points $z_1$, $z_2$, and $z_3$ and their basins of attraction.

For example, Figure 4 shows the Douady rabbit in the $z$ plane when $\gamma=\gamma_D=2.55268-0.959456i$, a point in the five-o'clock sprout of the right disk. For this value of $\gamma$, the map $\mathcal M$ has the repelling fixed points $z=0$ and $z=.656747-.129015i$. The three attracting fixed points of ${\mathcal M}^3$ (also called period-three fixed points) have the locations

$$\begin{align}
z_1 &= 0.499997032420304 - (1.221880225696050\times10^{-6})i{\;}{\;}{\mathrm {(red)}},\\
z_2 &= 0.638169999974373 - (0.239864000011495)i{\;}{\;}{\mathrm {(green)}},\\
z_3 &= 0.799901291393262 - (0.107547238170383)i{\;}{\;}{\mathrm {(yellow)}}.
\end{align}$$

The red, green, and yellow points lie in the basins $B(z_1)$, $B(z_2)$, and $B(z_3)$ of ${\mathcal M}^3$, respectively. The white points lie in the basin $B(\infty)$ of $\mathcal M$.

The action of $\mathcal M$ on these fixed points is given by the relations ${\mathcal M}z_1=z_2$, ${\mathcal M}z_2=z_3$, and ${\mathcal M}z_3=z_1$.

Corresponding to these relations there are the results

$$\begin{align}
{\mathcal M}B(z_1)&=B(z_2) {\;} {\mathrm {or}} {\;} {\mathcal M}{\;}{\mathrm {red}}\subseteq{\mathrm {green}},\\
{\mathcal M}B(z_2)&=B(z_3) {\;} {\mathrm {or}} {\;} {\mathcal M}{\;}{\mathrm {green}}\subseteq{\mathrm {yellow}},\\
{\mathcal M}B(z_3)&=B(z_1) {\;} {\mathrm {or}} {\;} {\mathcal M}{\;}{\mathrm {yellow}}\subseteq{\mathrm {red}}.
\end{align}$$

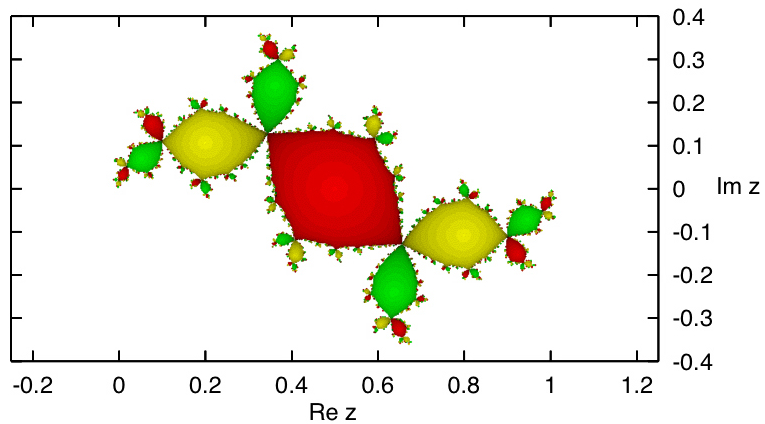
Figure 4: Douady rabbit for $\gamma=2.55268-0.959456i$ or $\mu=0.122565-0.744864i$

As a second example, Figure 5 shows a Douady rabbit when $\gamma=2-\gamma_D=-.55268+.959456i$, a point in the eleven-o'clock sprout on the left disk ($\mu$ is invariant under this transformation). This rabbit is more symmetrical in the plane. The period-three fixed points then are located at

$$\begin{align}
z_1&= 0.500003730675024 + (6.968273875812428 \times 10^{-6})i {\;}{\;} ({\mathrm {red}}),\\
z_2&=-0.138169999969259 + (0.239864000061970)i {\;}{\;} ({\mathrm {green}}),\\
z_3&= -0.238618870661709 - (0.264884797354373)i {\;}{\;} ({\mathrm {yellow}}).
\end{align}$$

The repelling fixed points of $\mathcal M$ itself are located at $z=0$ and $z=1.450795 + 0.7825835i$. The three major lobes on the left, which contain the period-three fixed points $z_1$,$z_2$, and $z_3$, meet at the fixed point $z=0$, and their counterparts on the right meet at the point $z=1$. It can be shown that the effect of $\mathcal M$ on points near the origin consists of a counterclockwise rotation about the origin of $\arg(\gamma)$, or very nearly $120^\circ$, followed by scaling (dilation) by a factor of $|\gamma|=1.1072538$.

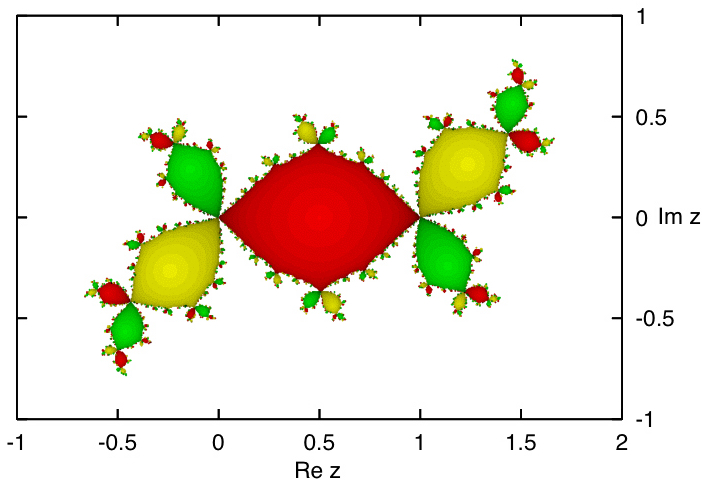
Figure 5: Douady rabbit for $\gamma=-0.55268+0.959456i$ or $\mu=0.122565-0.744864i$

== Variants ==
A twisted rabbit is the composition of a rabbit polynomial with $n$ powers of Dehn twists about its ears.

The corabbit is the symmetrical image of the rabbit. Here parameter $c \approx -0.1226 -0.7449i$. It is one of 2 other polynomials inducing the same permutation of their post-critical set are the rabbit.

=== 3D ===
The Julia set has no direct analog in three dimensions.

=== 4D ===
A quaternion Julia set with parameters $c = -0.123 + 0.745i$ and a cross-section in the $xy$ plane. The Douady rabbit is visible in the cross-section.

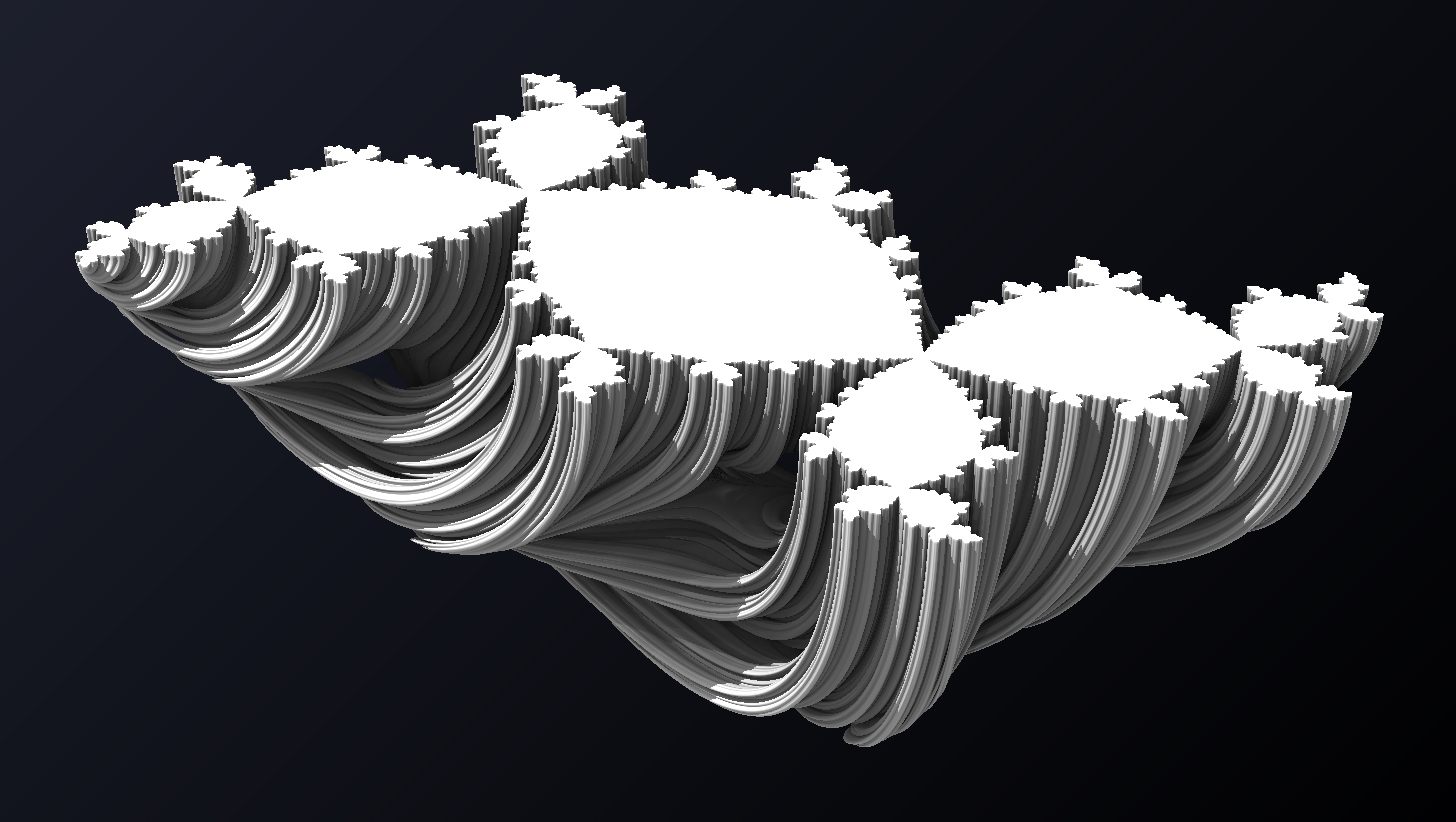

=== Embedded ===
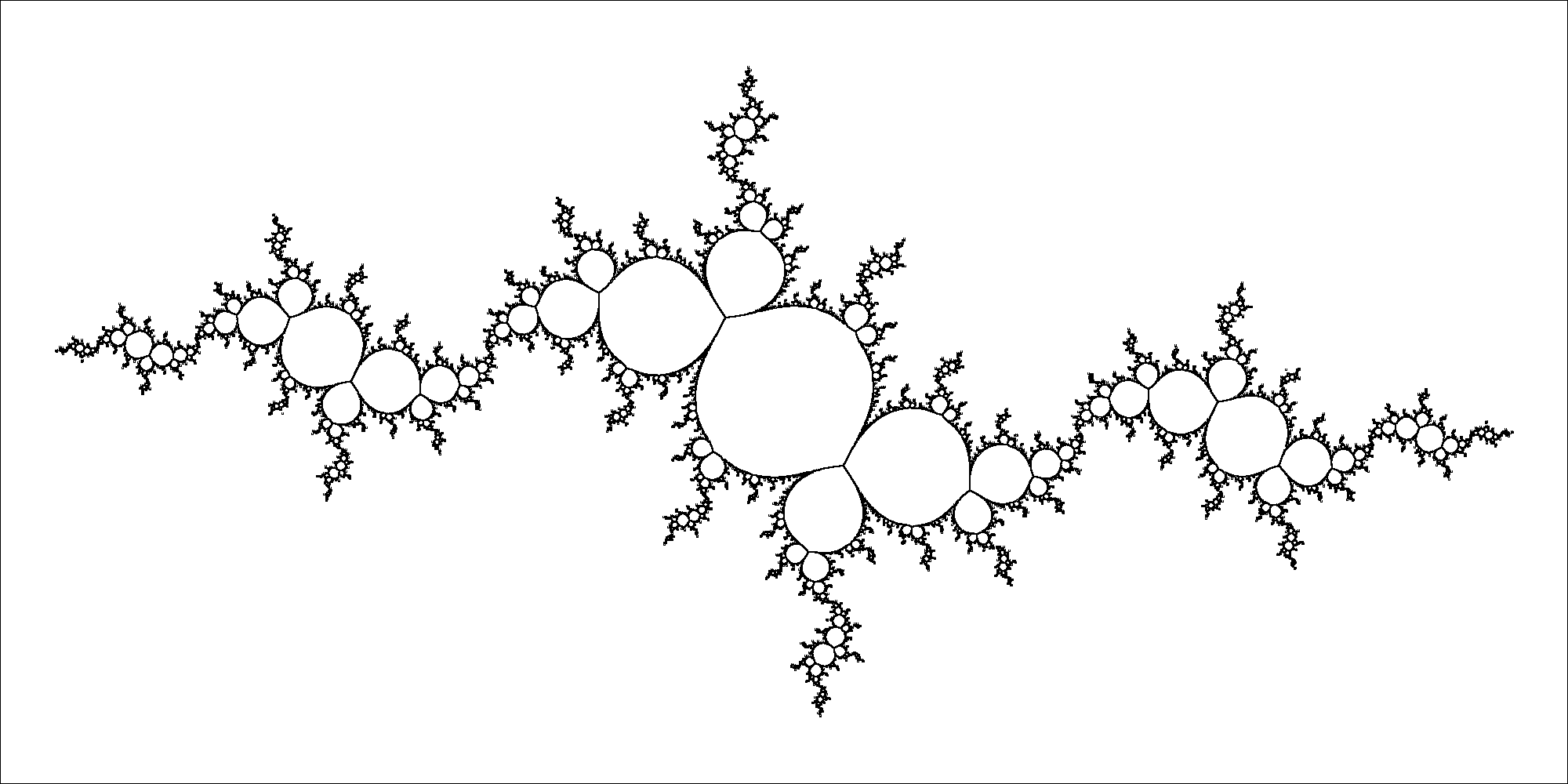

A small embedded homeomorphic copy of rabbit in the center of a Julia set

=== Fat ===
The fat rabbit or chubby rabbit has c at the root of the 1/3-limb of the Mandelbrot set. It has a parabolic fixed point with 3 petals.

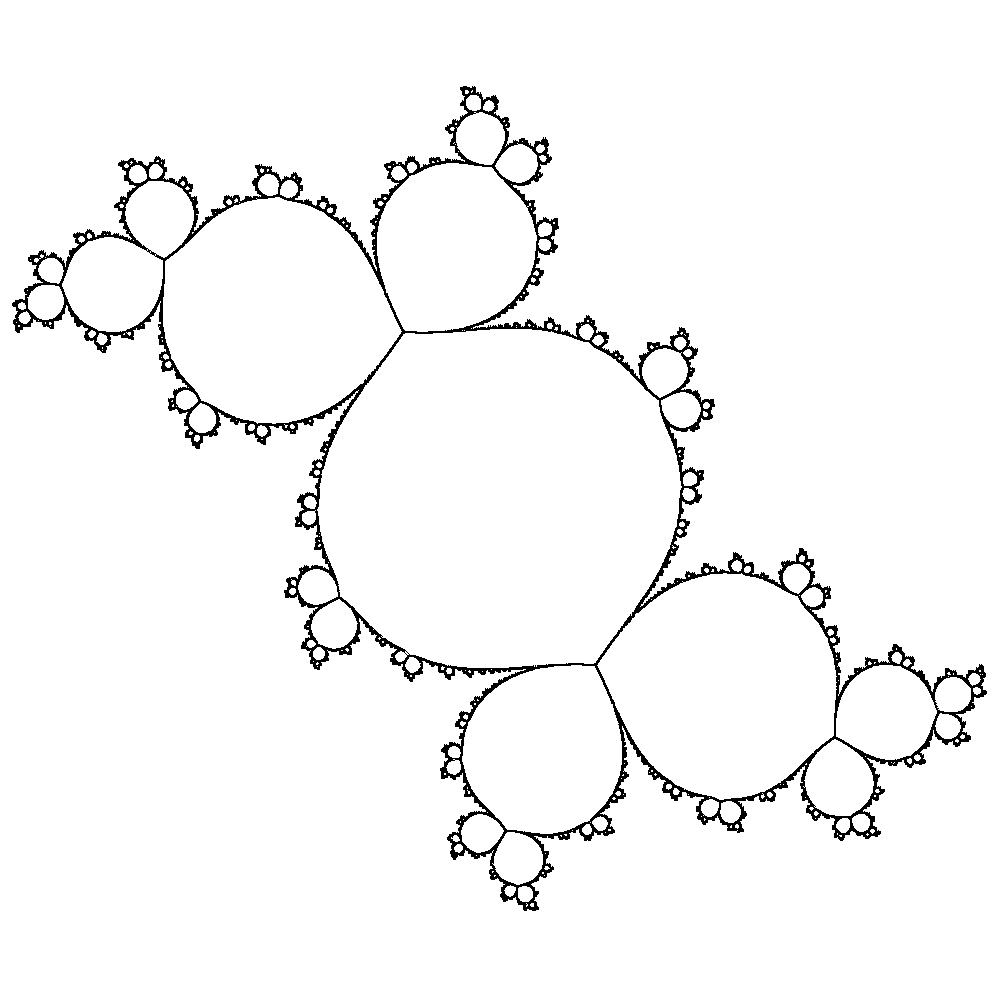
Fat rabbit

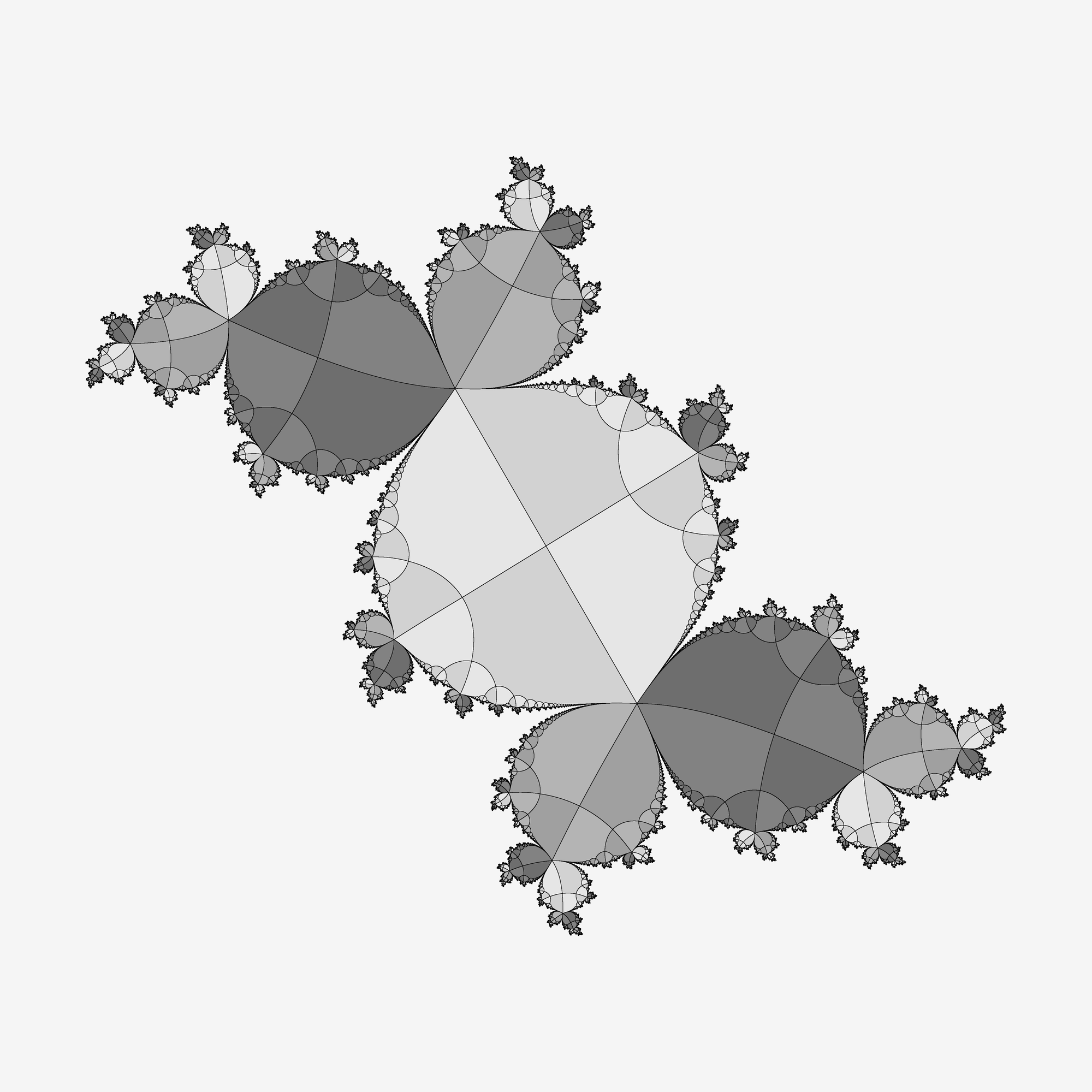
Parabolic chessboard

=== n-th eared ===
In general, the rabbit for the $period-(n+1)$th bulb of the main cardioid will have $n$ ears For example, a period four bulb rabbit has three ears.

=== Perturbed ===
Perturbed rabbit

Perturbed rabbit

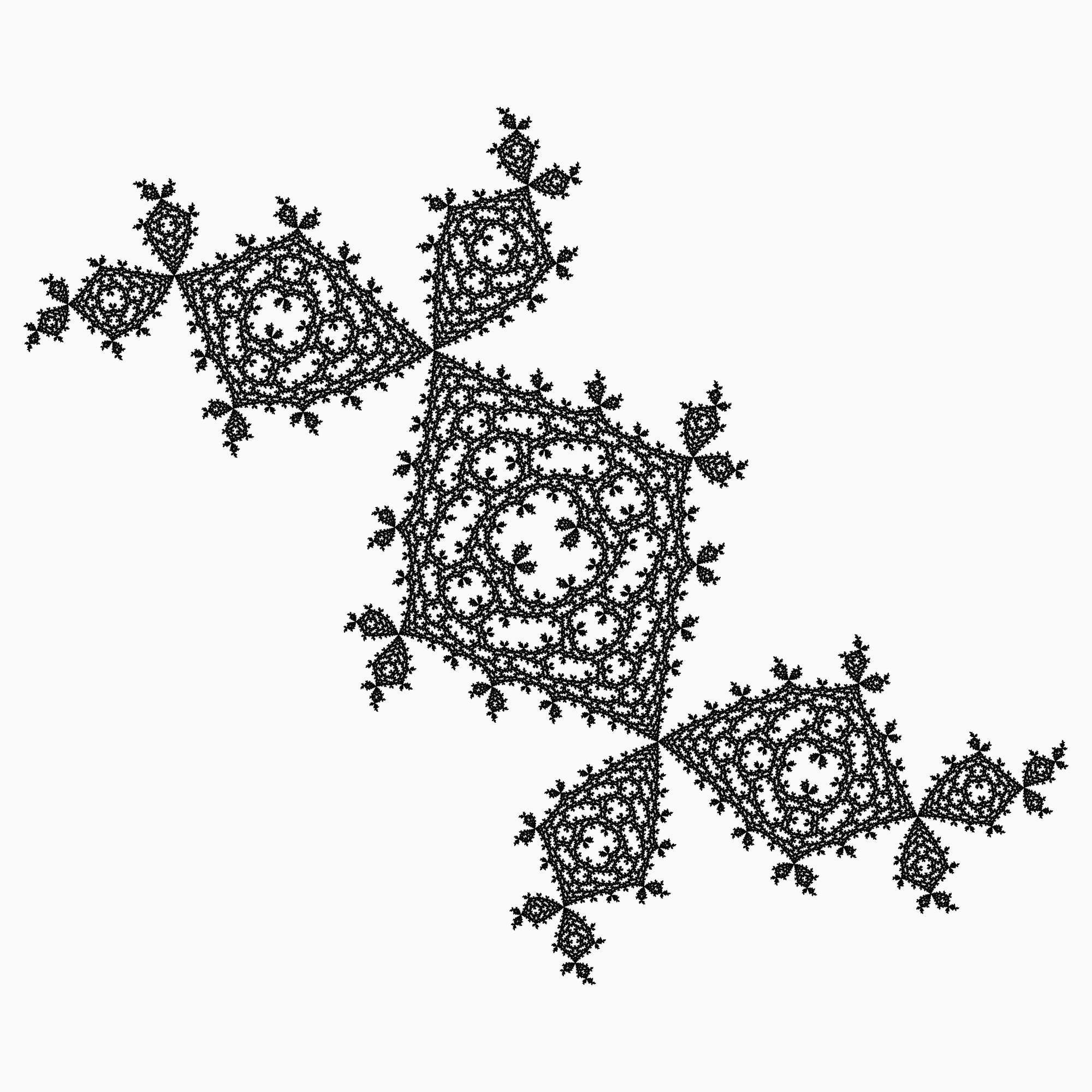
Perturbed rabbit

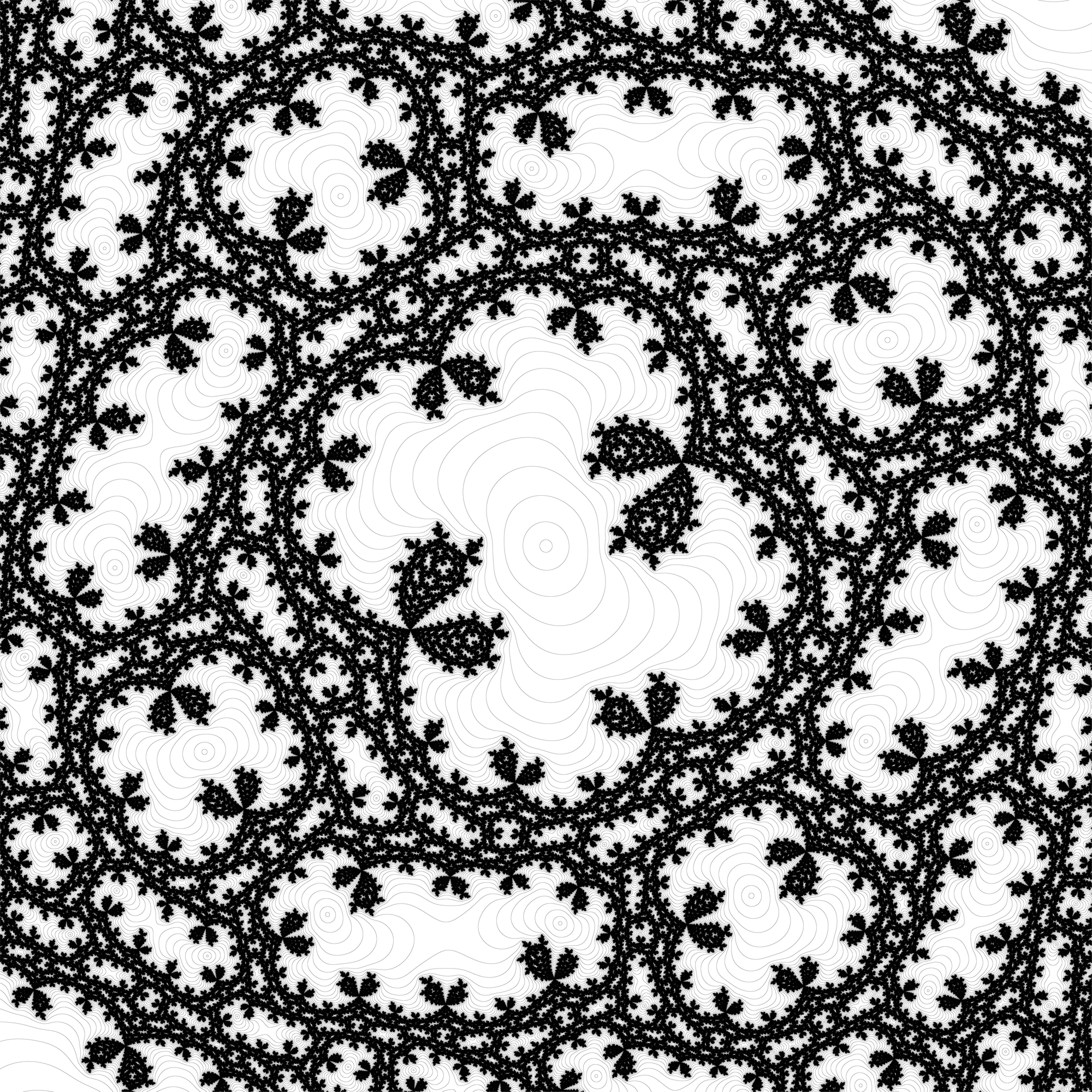
Perturbed rabbit zoom

== Twisted rabbit problem ==
In the early 1980s, Hubbard posed the so-called twisted rabbit problem, a polynomial classification problem. The goal is to determine Thurston equivalence types of functions of complex numbers that usually are not given by a formula (these are called topological polynomials):

- given a topological quadratic whose branch point is periodic with period three, determining which quadratic polynomial it is Thurston equivalent to
- determining the equivalence class of twisted rabbits, i.e. composite of the rabbit polynomial with nth powers of Dehn twists about its ears.

The problem was originally solved by Laurent Bartholdi and Volodymyr Nekrashevych using iterated monodromic groups. The generalization of the problem to the case where the number of post-critical points is arbitrarily large has been solved as well.

== Gallery ==
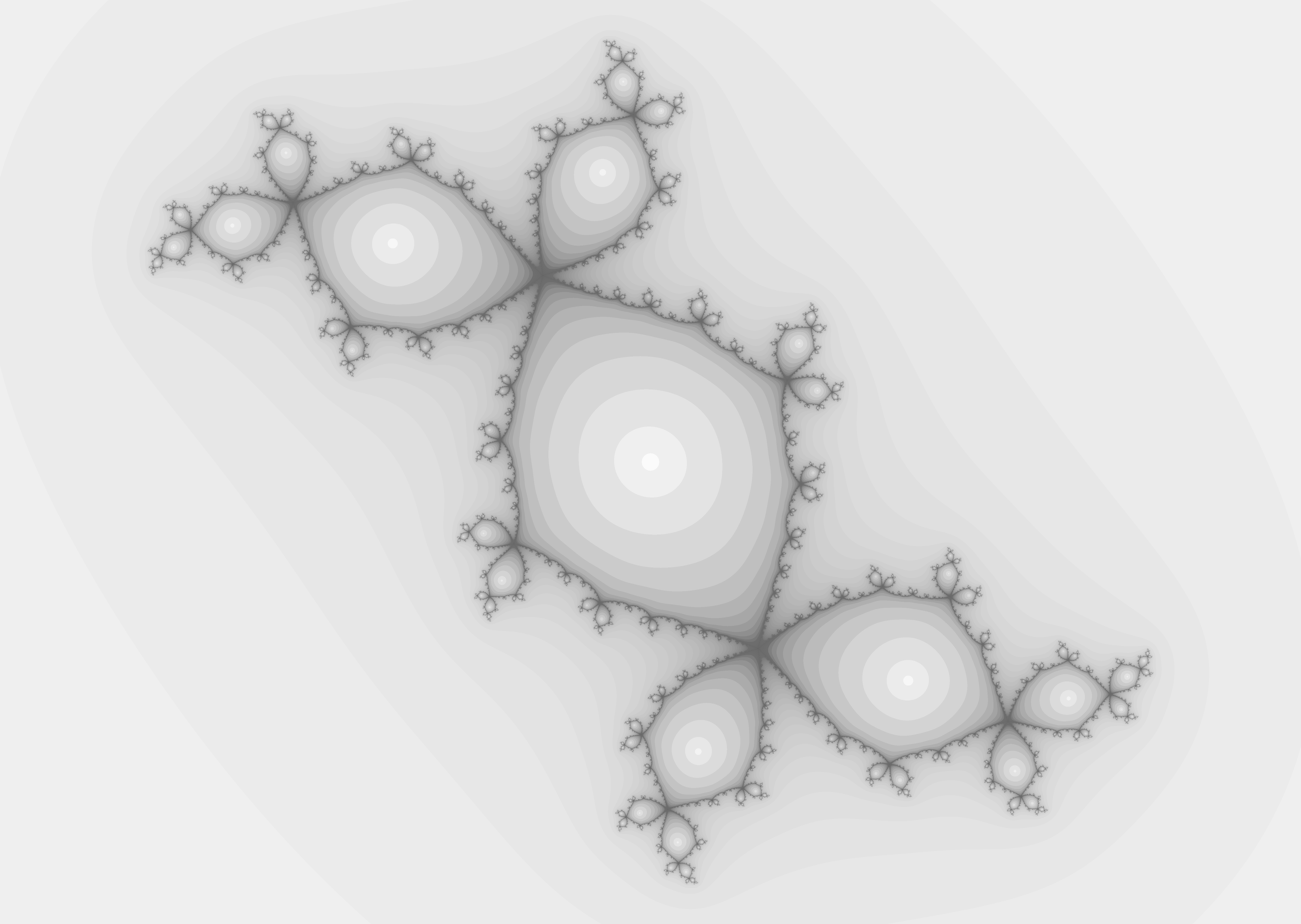
Gray levels indicate the speed of convergence to infinity or to the attractive cycle

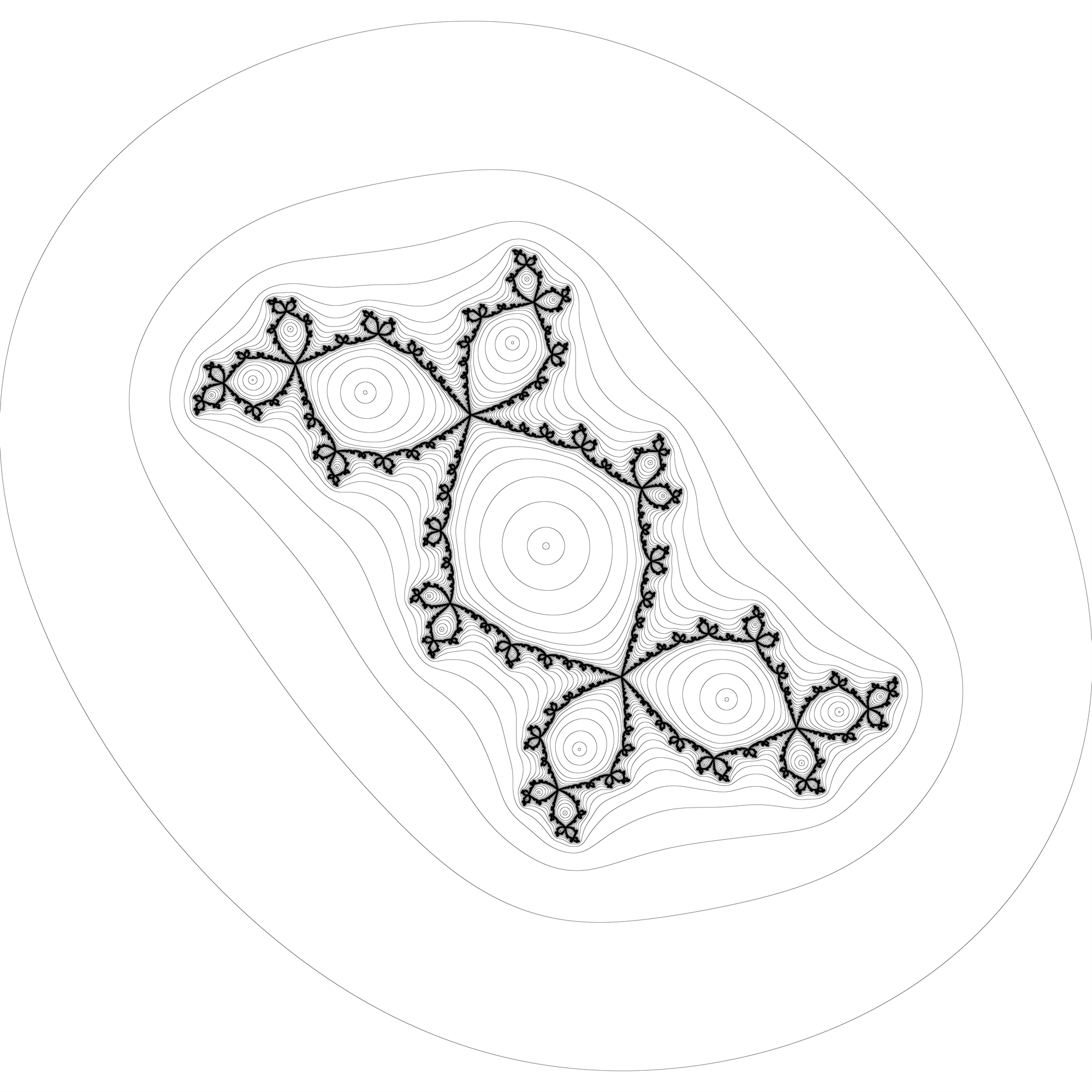
Boundaries of level sets

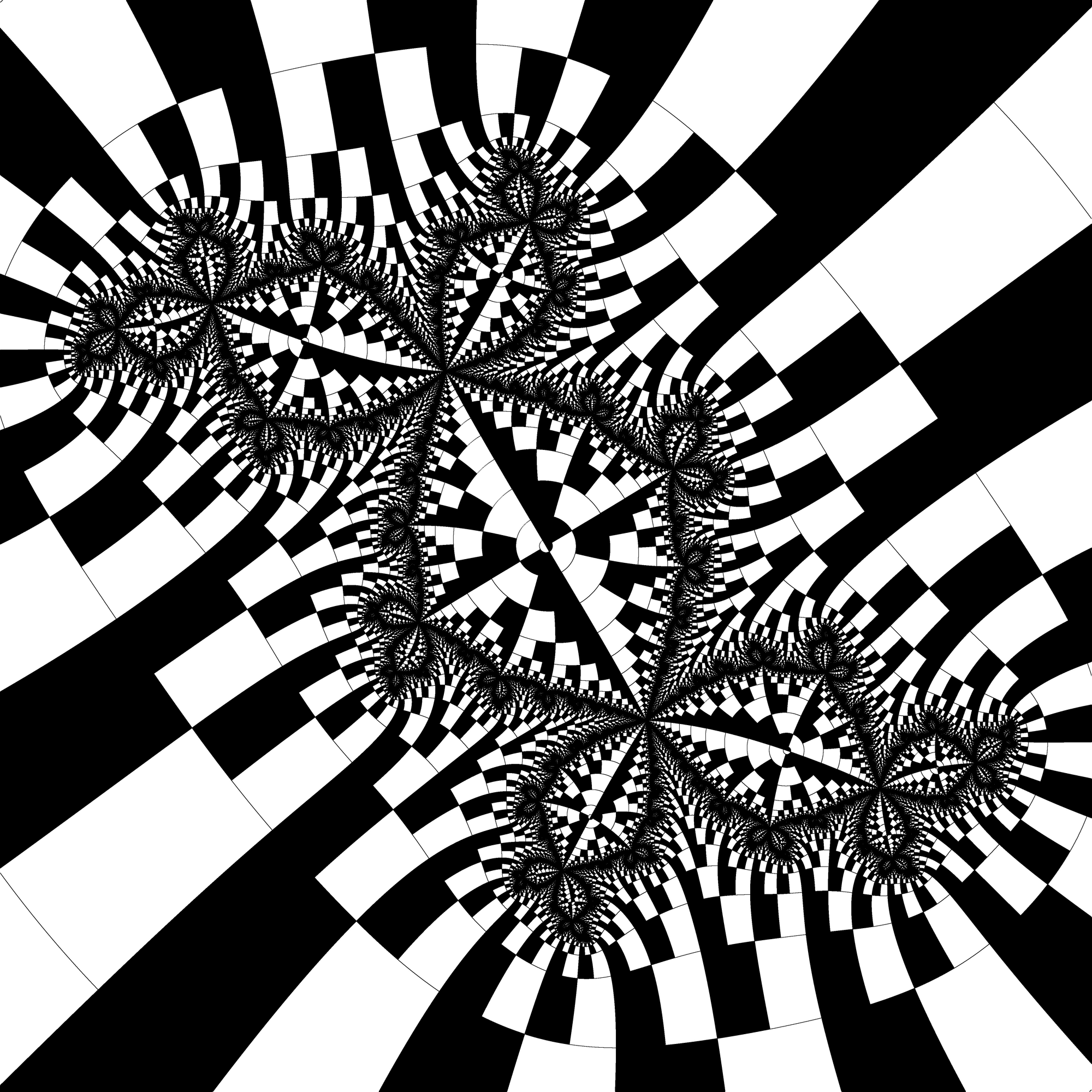
Binary decomposition

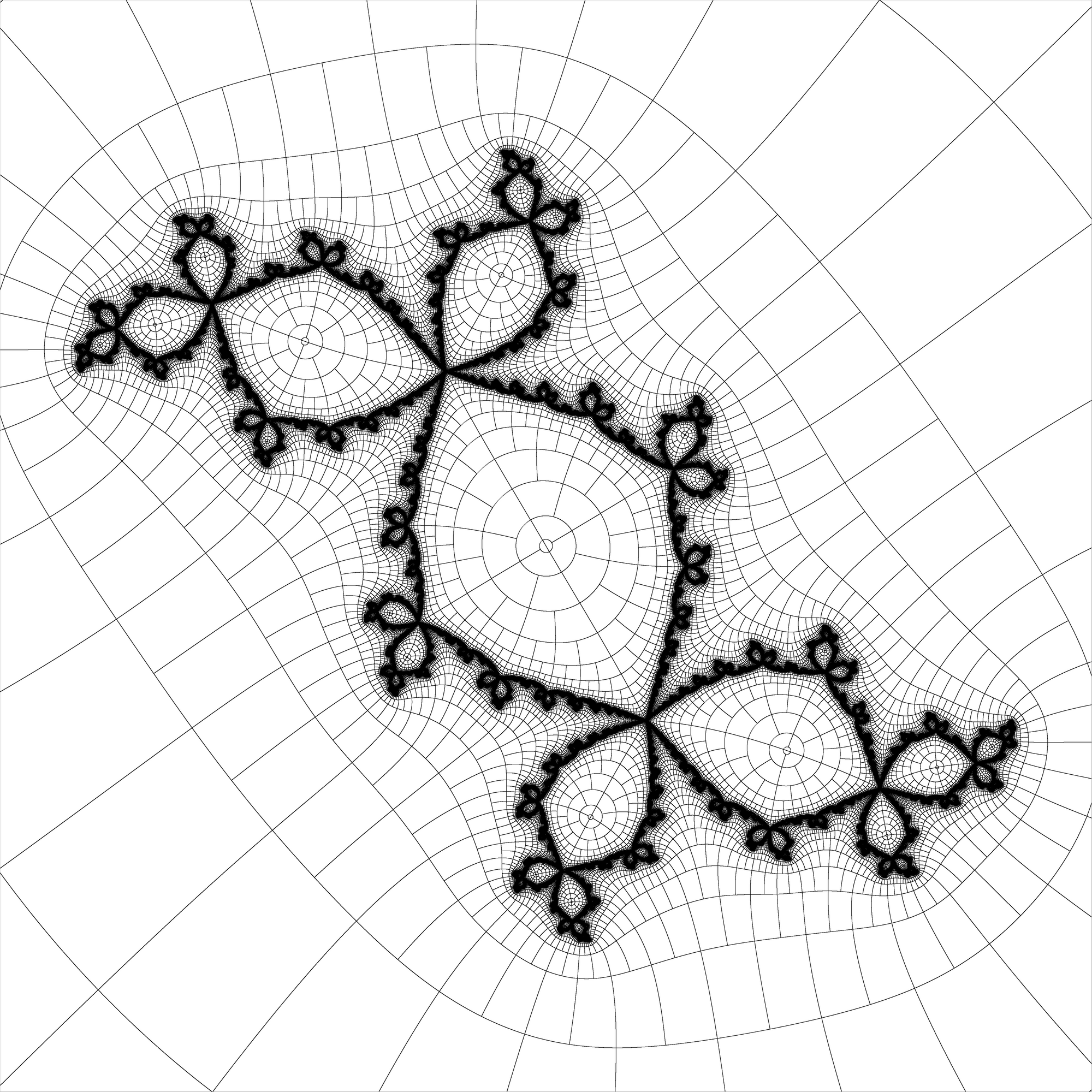

With spine

With external rays

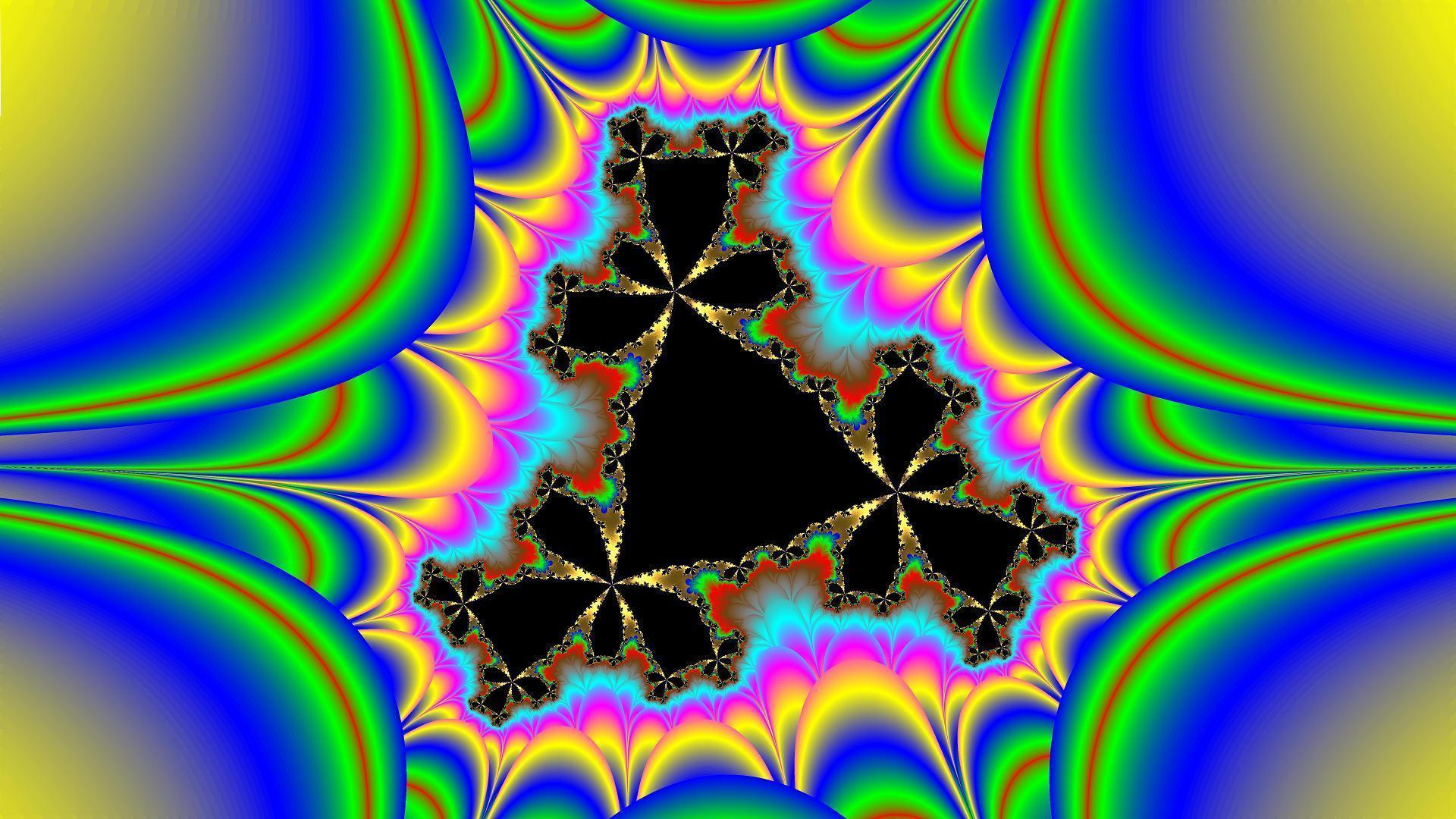
Multibrot-4 Douady rabbit

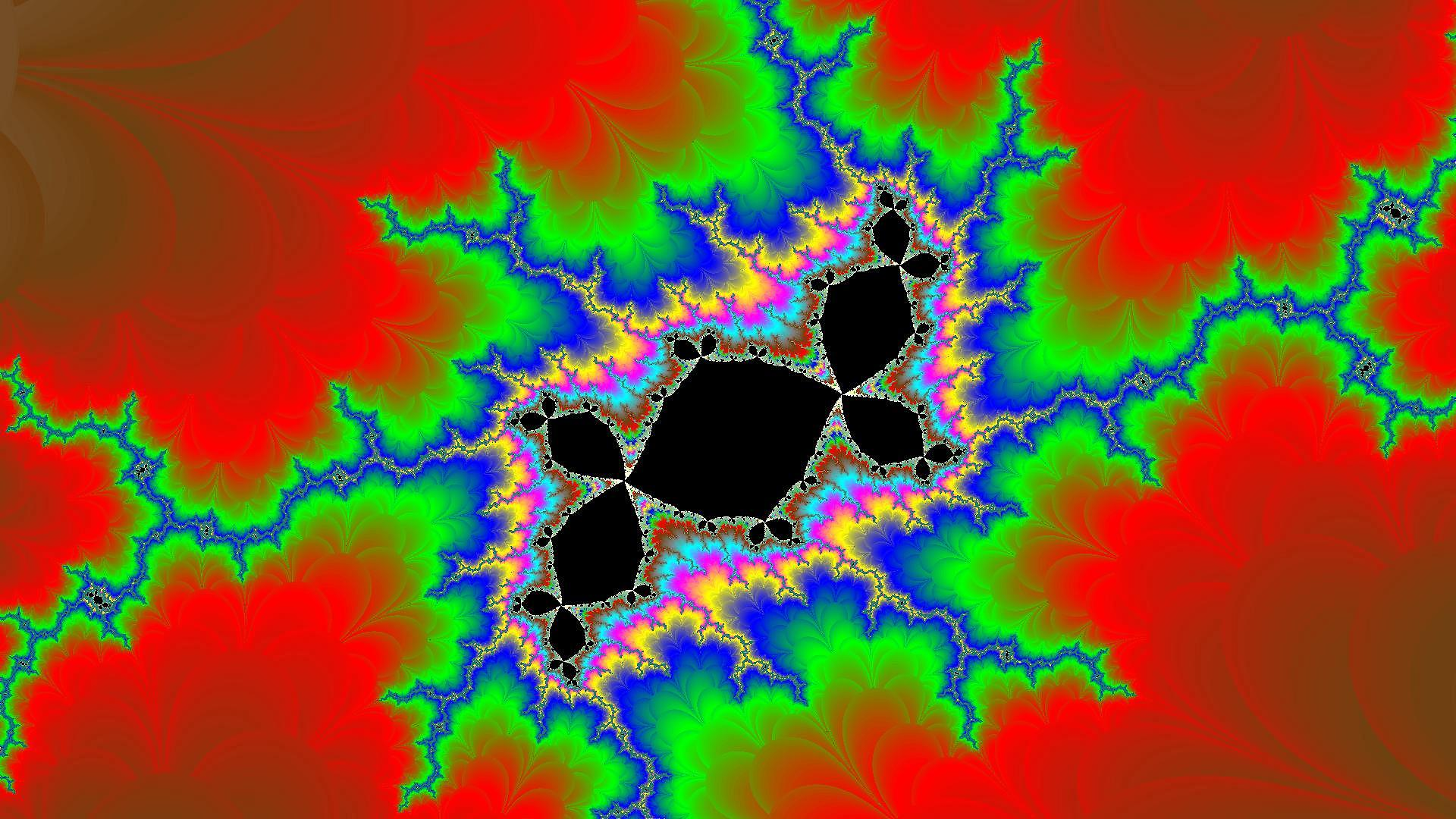
A Douady rabbit on a red background

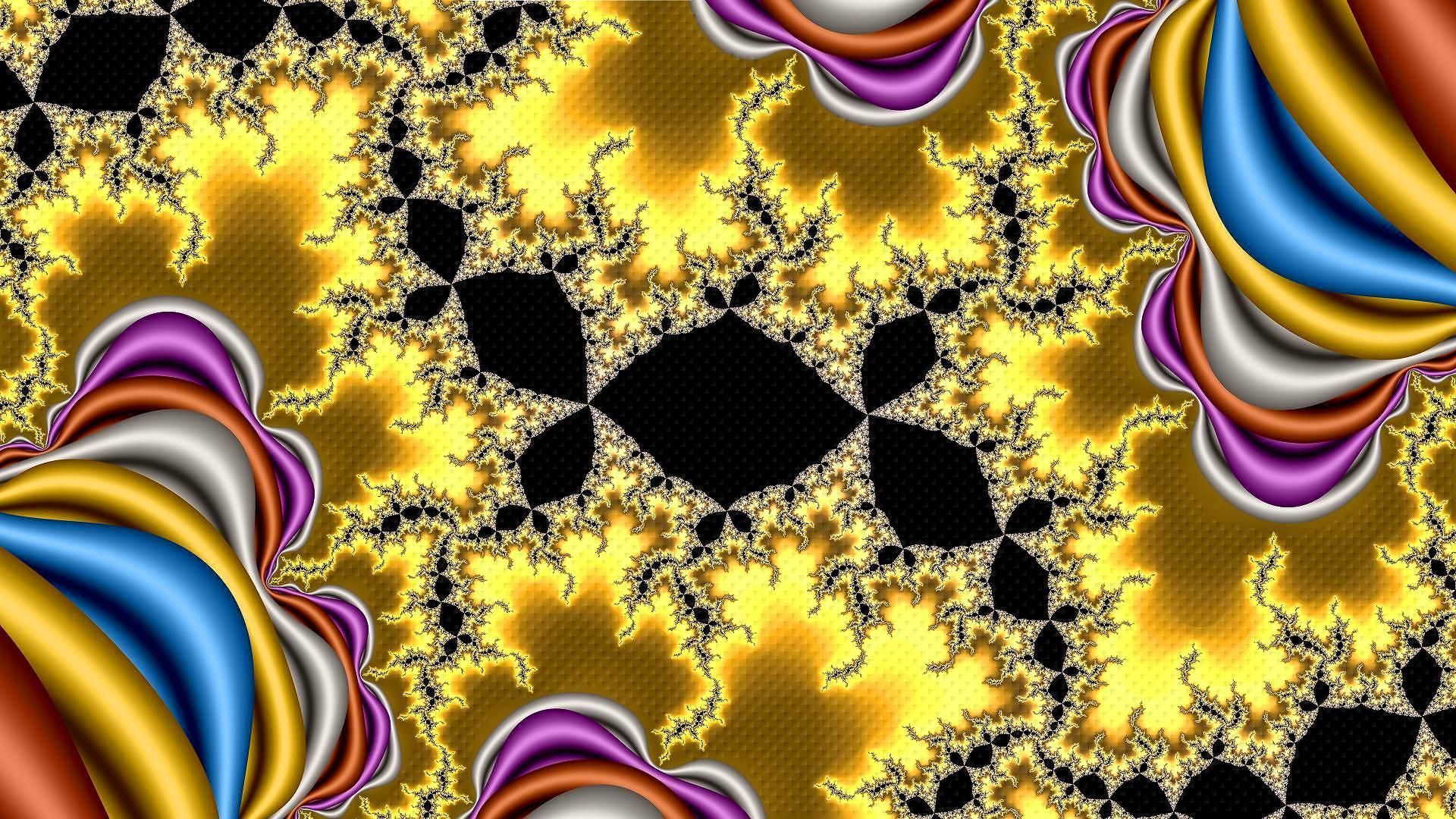
A chain of Douady rabbits

== See also ==
- Dragon curve
- Herman ring
- Siegel disc
