= Filled Julia set =

Complex Set that does not escape under iteration of a given function

The filled-in Julia set $K(f)$ of a polynomial $f$ is the union of a Julia set and its interior, non-escaping set.

== Formal definition ==
The filled-in Julia set $K(f)$ of a polynomial $f$ is defined as the set of all points $z$ of the dynamical plane that have bounded orbit with respect to $f$
$$K(f) \overset{\mathrm{def}}{{}={}} \left \{ z \in \mathbb{C} : f^{(k)} (z) \not\to \infty ~ \text{as} ~ k \to \infty \right\}$$
where:

- $\mathbb{C}$ is the set of complex numbers
- $f^{(k)} (z)$ is the $k$ -fold composition of $f$ with itself = iteration of function $f$

== Relation to the Fatou set ==
The filled-in Julia set is the (absolute) complement of the attractive basin of infinity.
$$K(f) = \mathbb{C} \setminus A_{f}(\infty)$$

The attractive basin of infinity is one of the components of the Fatou set.
$$A_{f}(\infty) = F_\infty$$

In other words, the filled-in Julia set is the complement of the unbounded Fatou component:
$$K(f) = F_\infty^C.$$

== Relation between Julia, filled-in Julia set and attractive basin of infinity ==
The Julia set is the common boundary of the filled-in Julia set and the attractive basin of infinity
$$J(f) = \partial K(f) = \partial A_{f}(\infty)$$
where: $A_{f}(\infty)$ denotes the attractive basin of infinity = exterior of filled-in Julia set = set of escaping points for $f$

$$A_{f}(\infty) \ \overset{\underset{\mathrm{def}}{}}{=} \ \{ z \in \mathbb{C} : f^{(k)} (z) \to \infty\ as\ k \to \infty \}.$$

If the filled-in Julia set has no interior then the Julia set coincides with the filled-in Julia set. This happens when all the critical points of $f$ are pre-periodic. Such critical points are often called Misiurewicz points.

== Spine ==
Rabbit Julia set with spine

Basilica Julia set with spine

The most studied polynomials are probably those of the form $f(z) = z^2 + c$, which are often denoted by $f_c$, where $c$ is any complex number. In this case, the spine $S_c$ of the filled Julia set $K$ is defined as arc between $\beta$-fixed point and $-\beta$,
$$S_c = \left [ - \beta , \beta \right ]$$
with such properties:

- spine lies inside $K$. This makes sense when $K$ is connected and full
- spine is invariant under 180 degree rotation,
- spine is a finite topological tree,
- Critical point $z_{cr} = 0$ always belongs to the spine.
- $\beta$-fixed point is a landing point of external ray of angle zero $\mathcal{R}^K _0$,
- $-\beta$ is landing point of external ray $\mathcal{R}^K _{1/2}$.

Algorithms for constructing the spine:

- detailed version is described by A. Douady
- Simplified version of algorithm:
  - connect $- \beta$ and $\beta$ within $K$ by an arc,
  - when $K$ has empty interior then arc is unique,
  - otherwise take the shortest way that contains $0$.

Curve $R$:
$$R \overset{\mathrm{def}}{{}={}} R_{1/2} \cup S_c \cup R_0$$
divides dynamical plane into two components.

== Images ==
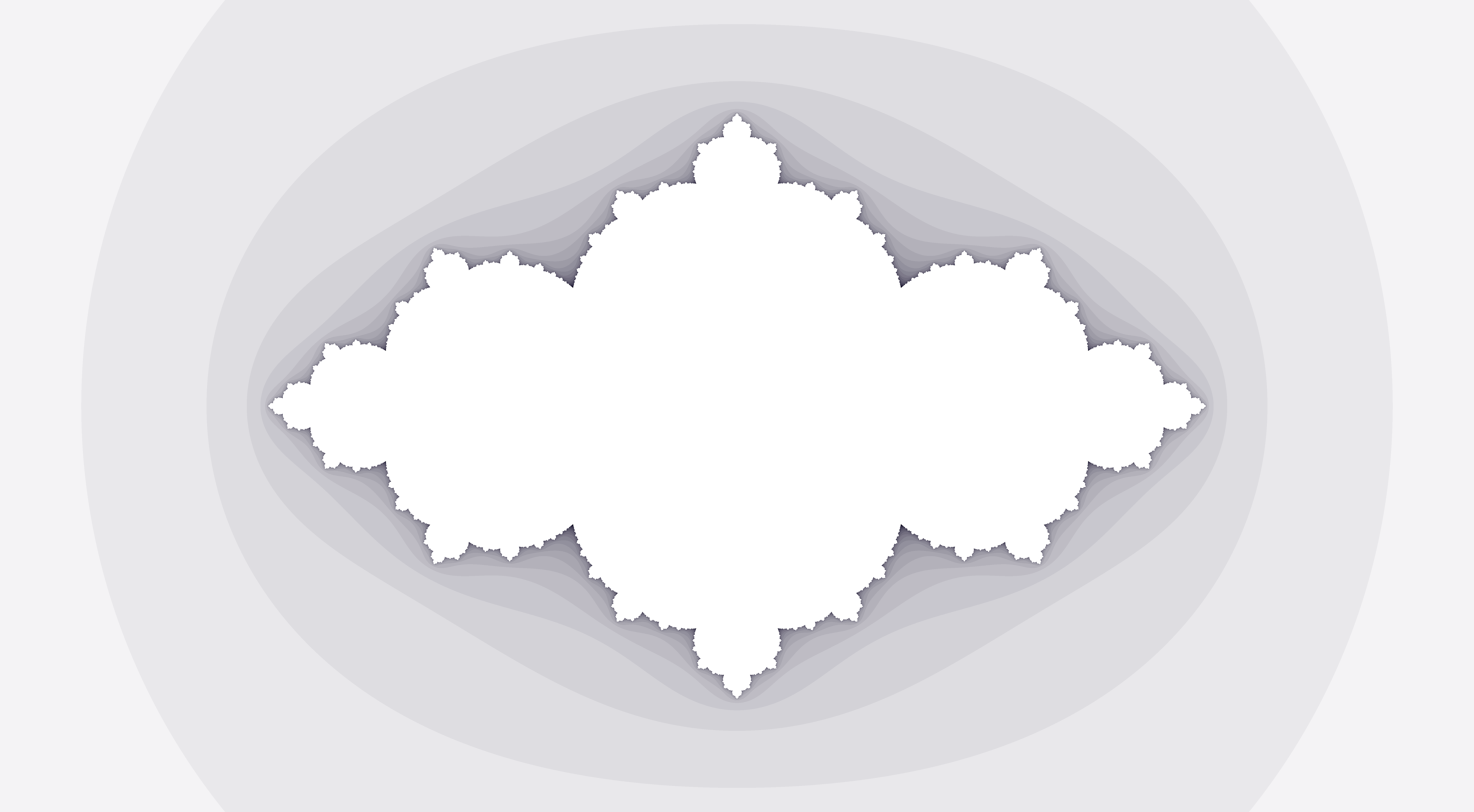
Filled Julia set for f_{c}, c=1−φ=−0.618033988749…, where φ is the Golden ratio

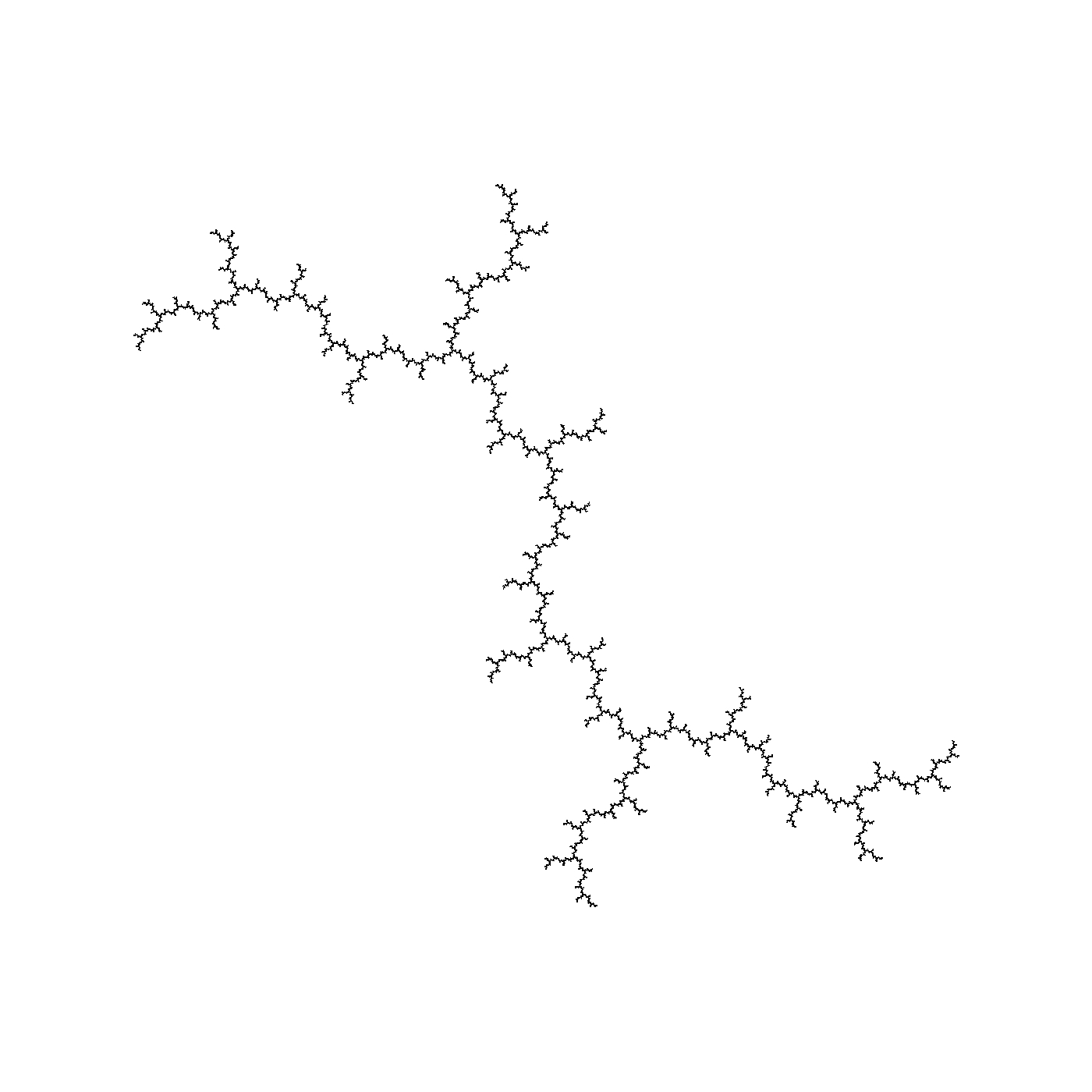
Filled Julia with no interior = Julia set. This example has c=i.

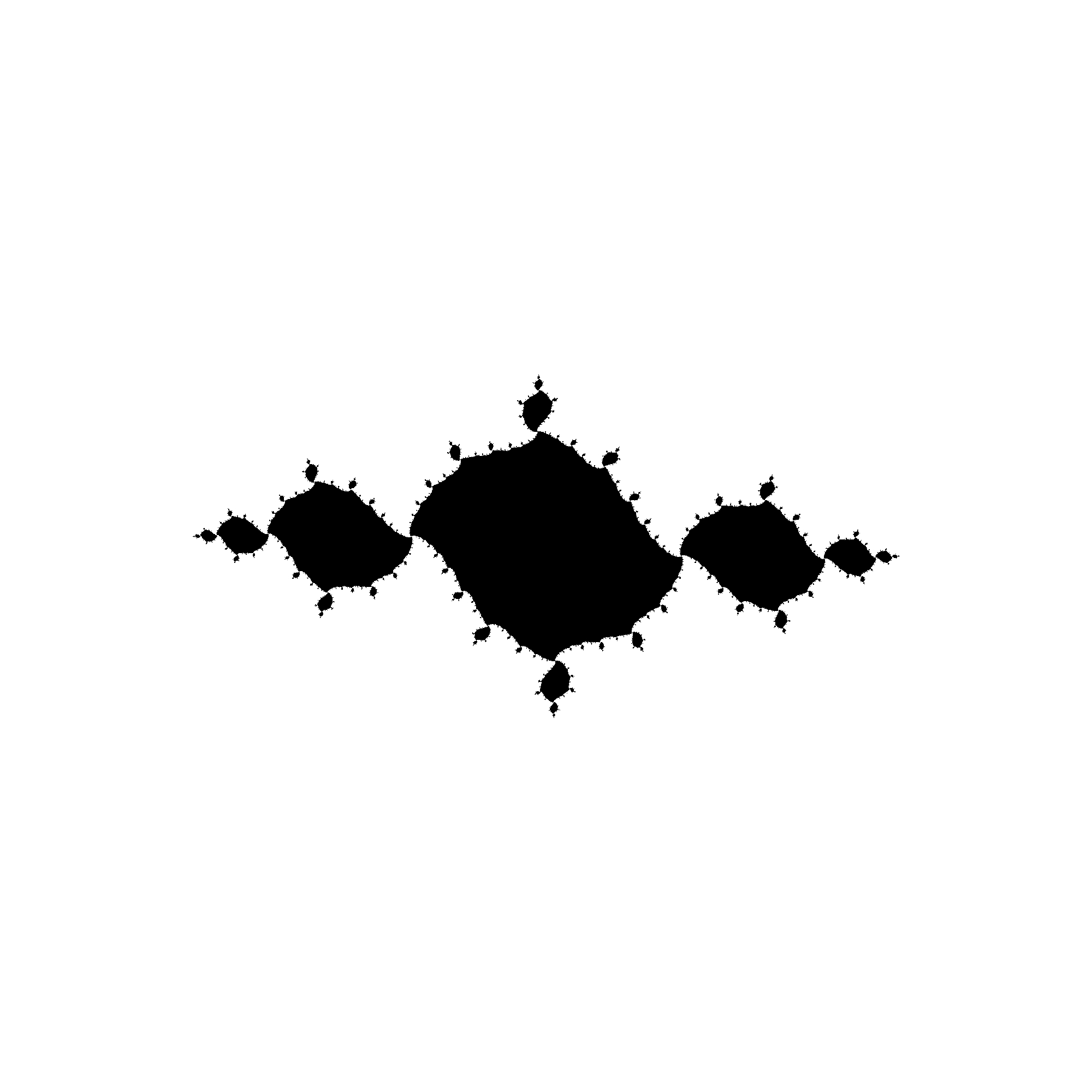
Filled Julia set for c=−1+0.1*i. Here Julia set is the boundary of filled-in Julia set.

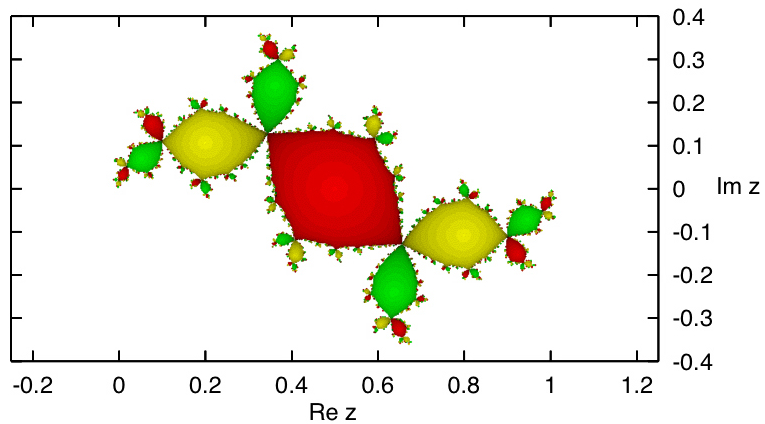
Douady rabbit

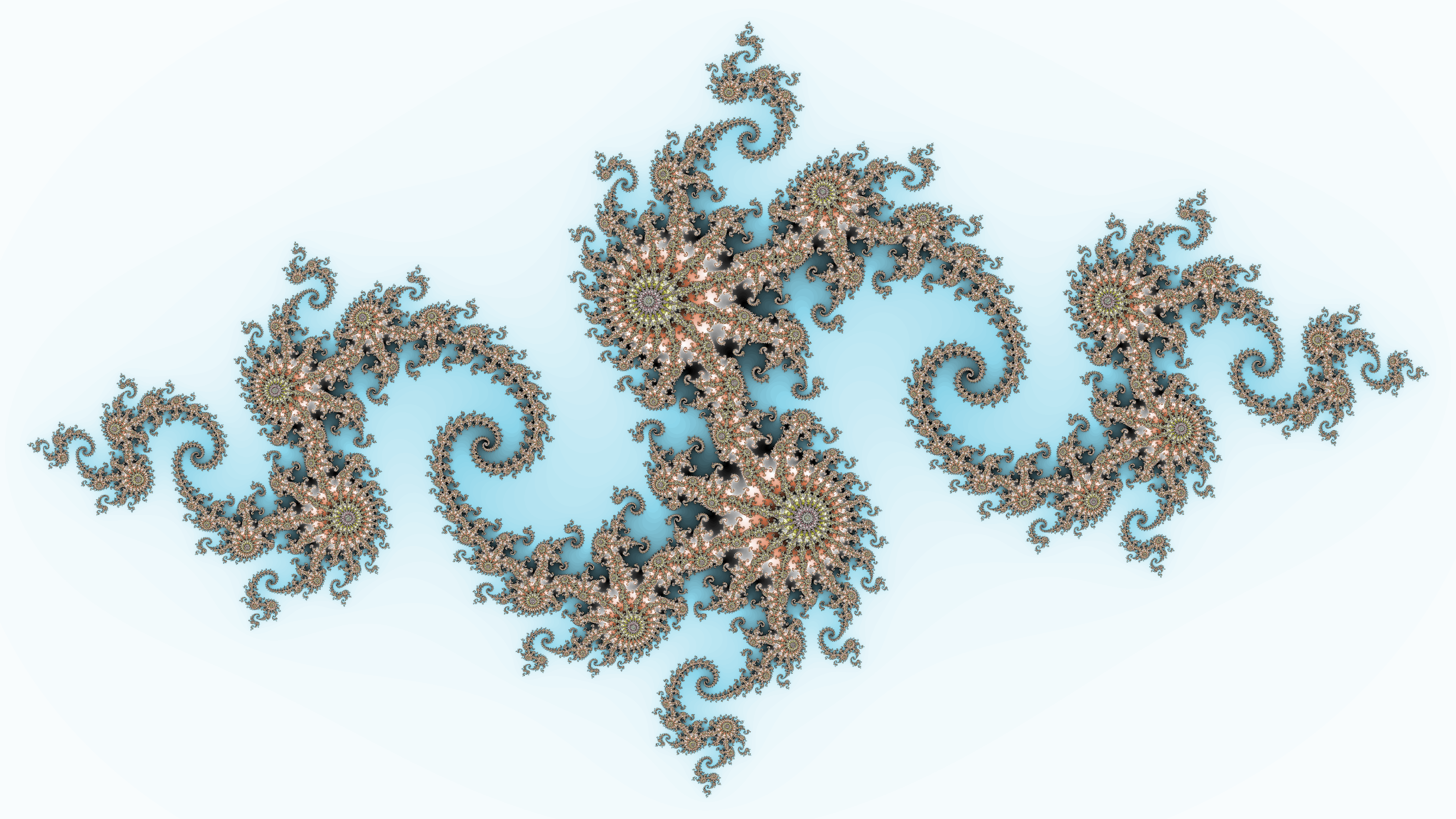
Filled Julia set for c = −0.8 + 0.156i.

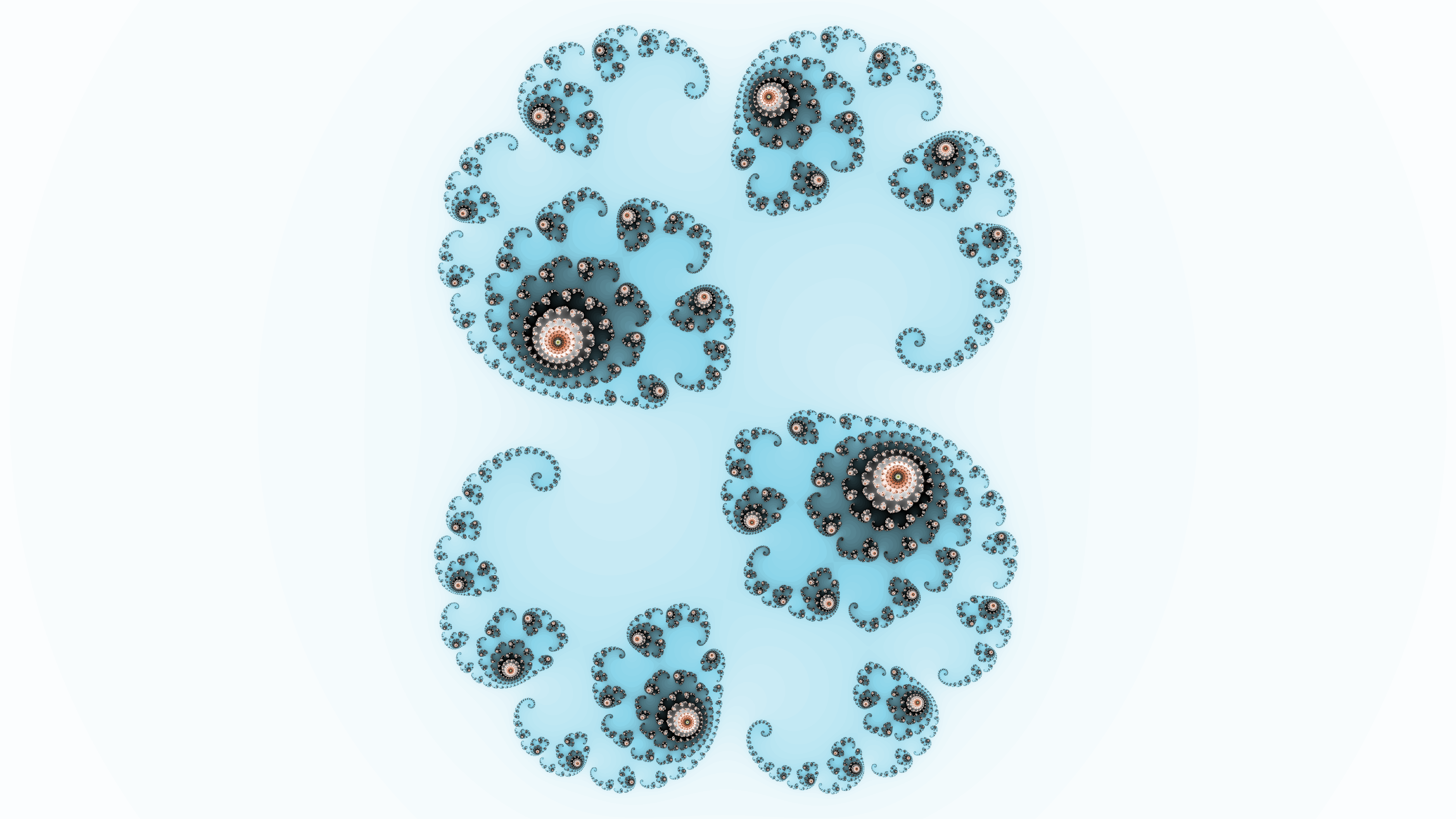
Filled Julia set for c = 0.285 + 0.01i.

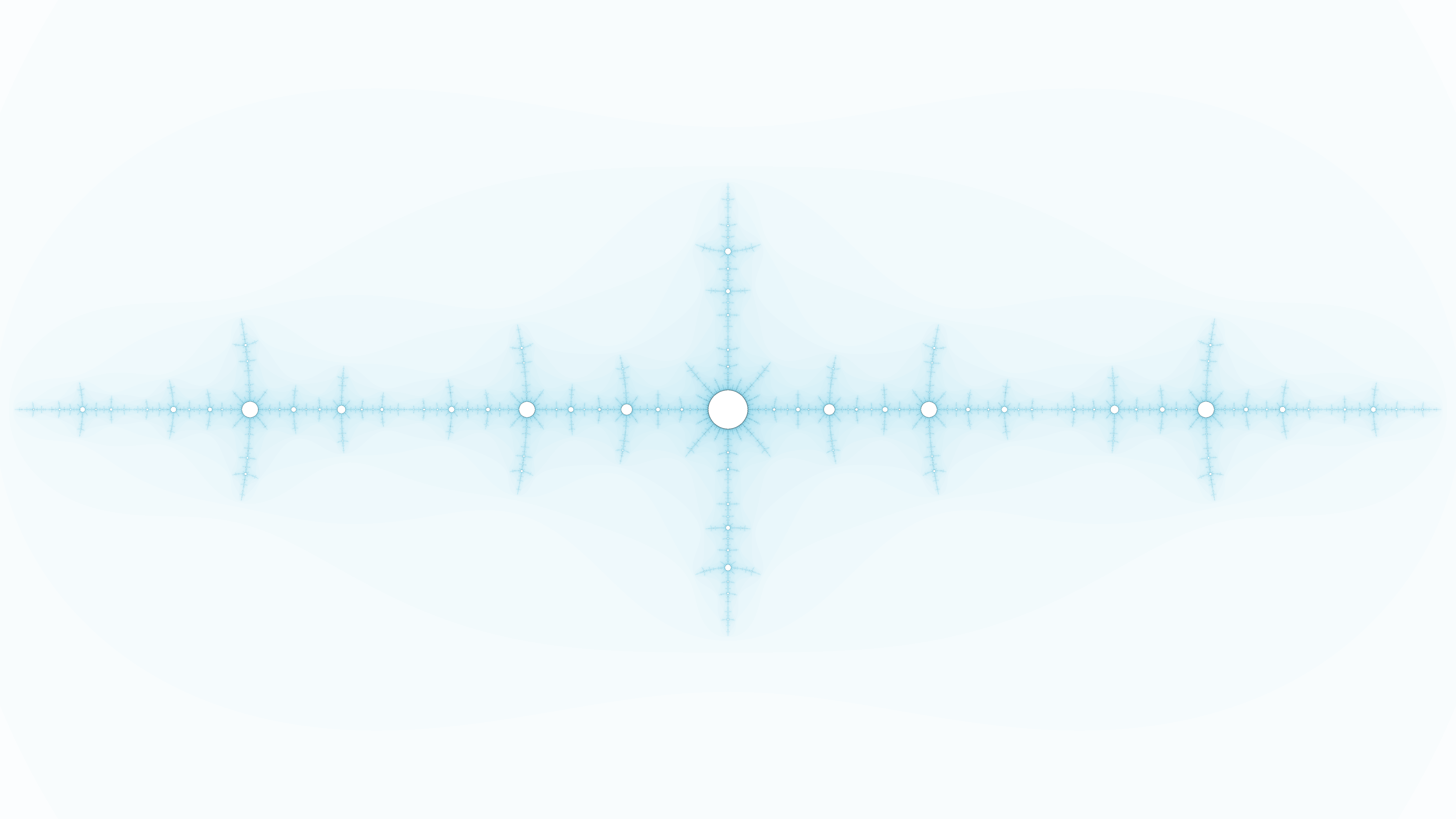
Filled Julia set for c = −1.476.

== Names ==
- airplane
- Douady rabbit
- dragon
- basilica or San Marco fractal or San Marco dragon
- cauliflower
- dendrite
- Siegel disc
