= Jean-Antoine Villemin =

French physician (1827–1892)

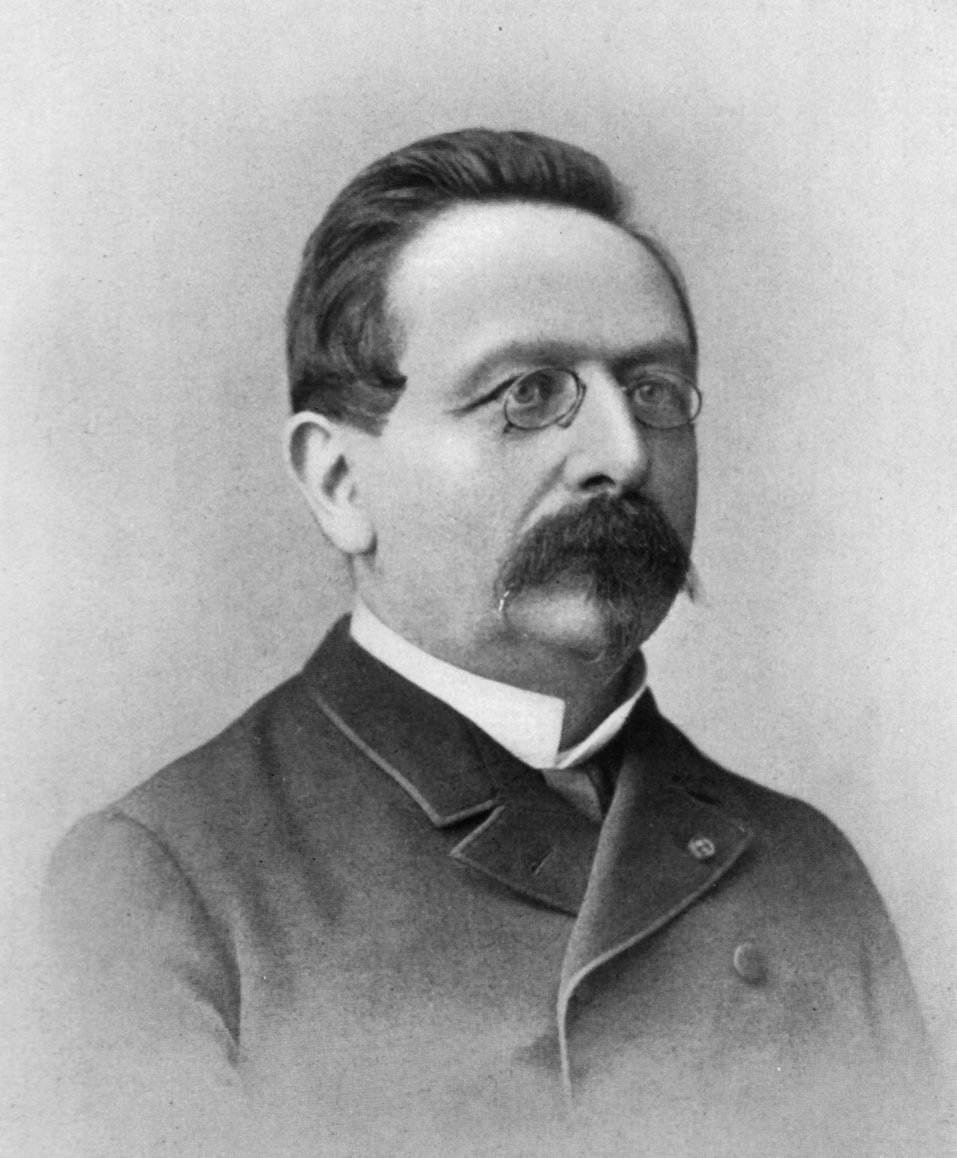
Jean-Antoine Villemin

Jean-Antoine Villemin (January 28, 1827 – October 6, 1892) was a French physician born in Prey, Vosges. In 1865 he demonstrated that tuberculosis was an infectious disease.

== Biography ==
Villemin was born in the department of Vosges, and studied medicine at the military medical school at Strasbourg, qualifying as an army doctor in 1853. Afterwards he practiced medicine at the military hospital of Val-de-Grâce in Paris. In 1874 he became a member of the French Académie Nationale de Médecine, and was its vice-president in 1891.

In 1865 Villemin proved that tuberculosis was an infectious disease by inoculating laboratory rabbits with material from infected humans and cattle. He published his results in the treatise Études sur la Tuberculose (Studies on Tuberculosis). Here he describes the transmission of tuberculosis from humans to rabbits, from cattle to rabbits, and from rabbits to rabbits. However, his findings were ignored by the scientific community at the time, and Villemin's contributions wouldn't be realized until years later when they were corroborated by other scientists. The Prix Leconte was posthumously awarded to Villemin (and its ₣50,000 presented to his heirs) in 1892 in recognition of his work.
