= Philbert Maurice d'Ocagne =

French engineer and mathematician

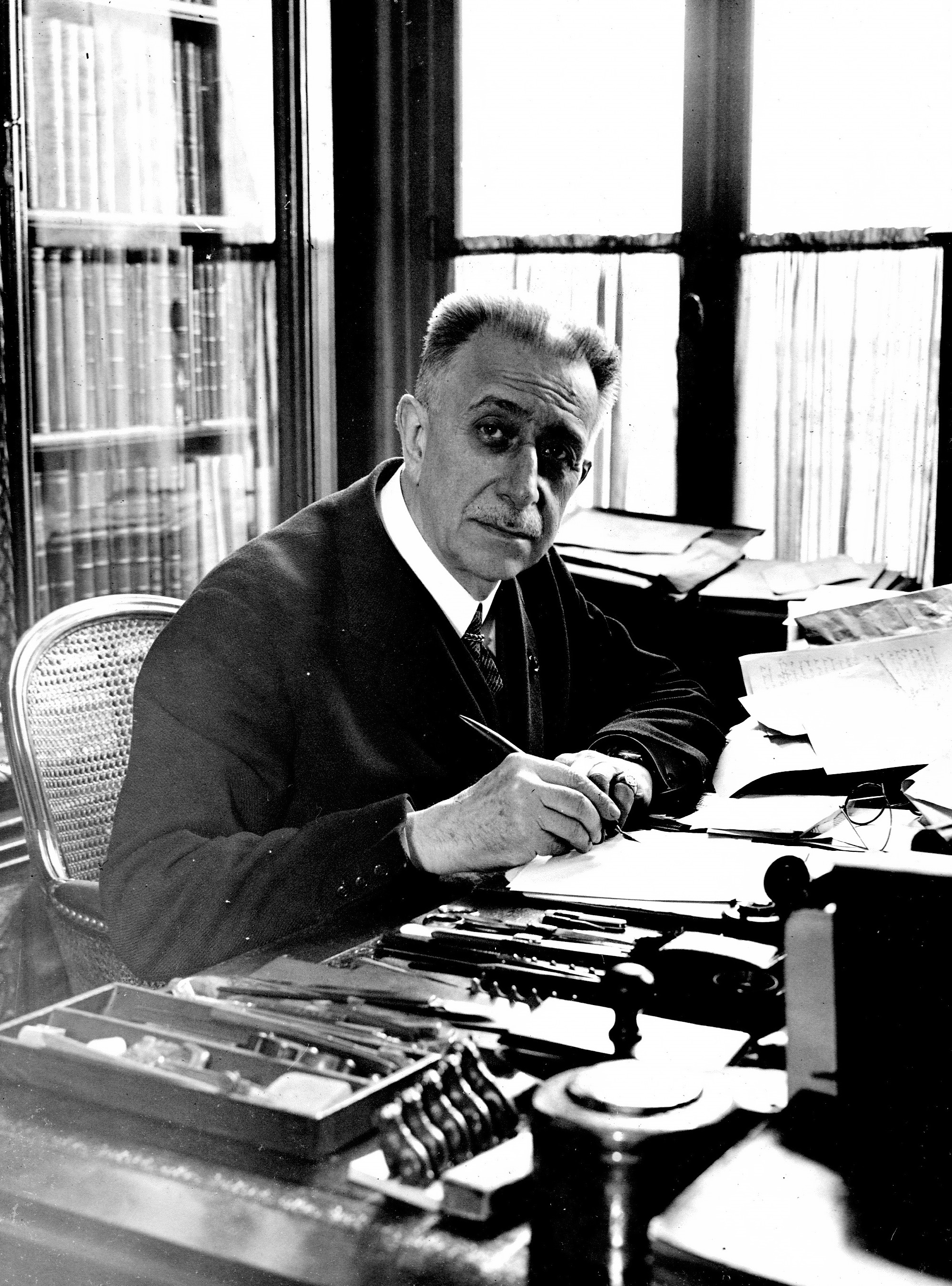
Philbert Maurice d'Ocagne, French mathematician and inventor of nomography

Philbert Maurice d'Ocagne (25 March 1862 – 23 September 1938) was a French engineer and mathematician. He founded the field of nomography, the graphic computation of algebraic equations, on charts that he called nomograms.

== Biography ==
Philbert Maurice d'Ocagne was born in Paris on 25 March 1862. He attended high school at the Lycée Fontanges school in Paris and studied at Chaptal college. In 1877, he published his first mathematical work. In 1880, he entered the École Polytechnique. He published many articles on math. Starting in 1885, he served for six years as an engineer, supporting waterworks projects in Rochefort and Cherbourg and then worked at Seine-et-Oise at the residence of Pontoise. From 1882, he continued to publish articles on mathematics in the French Academy of Sciences and major journals, including Journal of the École Polytechnique, Bulletin de la Société Mathématique de France, Acta Mathematica, Archiv der Mathematik und Physik, and American Journal of Mathematics. He became a tutor (répétiteur) at the École Polytechnique in 1893 and then in 1894 became a professor at the École Nationale des Ponts et Chaussées. In 1891, he began publishing papers on nomography.

In 1901, he was appointed deputy director of general survey of France. Ten years later, he became chief of maps and plans and precision instruments for the Ministry of Public Works. He was appointed chief engineer in 1908. In 1912 he was appointed professor of geometry at the École Polytechnique, and became Inspector General of roads and bridges in 1920. In 1893, he joined the faculty of the Polytechnic School, first as instructor of astronomy and geodesy. During WWI, his techniques for finding approximate solutions to the transcendental equations of plastic deformation allowed French gunmakers to implement autofrettage on an industrial scale and boost the output of artillery pieces. In early 1912, he became chair of geometry. In 1901, he became president of the Mathematical Society of France. In 1922, he was admitted to the Academy of Sciences.

== Family ==
Originally from the province of Alençon in Normandy, his family can be traced to the 8th century. d'Ocagne's lineage came from the du Plessis family, and he used the pseudonym Philbert du Plessis in some of his scientific publications. Mortimer d'Ocagne, Maurice's father, published widely on economic and financial topics and wrote a book on French higher education: Les Grandes Ecoles de France. He also served as the drama critic for the Revue Britannique, going to the theater every night and never missing a premiere. He served as the dean of the subscribers of the Opera. He died in 1919 at the age of 98.

== Awards ==
- Leconte Prize in 1892 for his work Nomographie
- Dalmont Prize of the Academy of Sciences (Paris) in 1894, for his mathematical work

== Selected works ==
- "Sur l'évaluation graphique des moments et des moments d'inertie des aires planes" (1884)
- Calcul graphique et nomographie, Paris, Doin (1908)

== Sources ==
- P. Humbert, "Maurice d’Ocagne (1862–1938)", Ciel et Terre, vol. 55, 1939, p. 108 http://adsabs.harvard.edu/full/1939C%26T....55..108H [archive]
