= Prey, Vosges =

Prey
- Commune
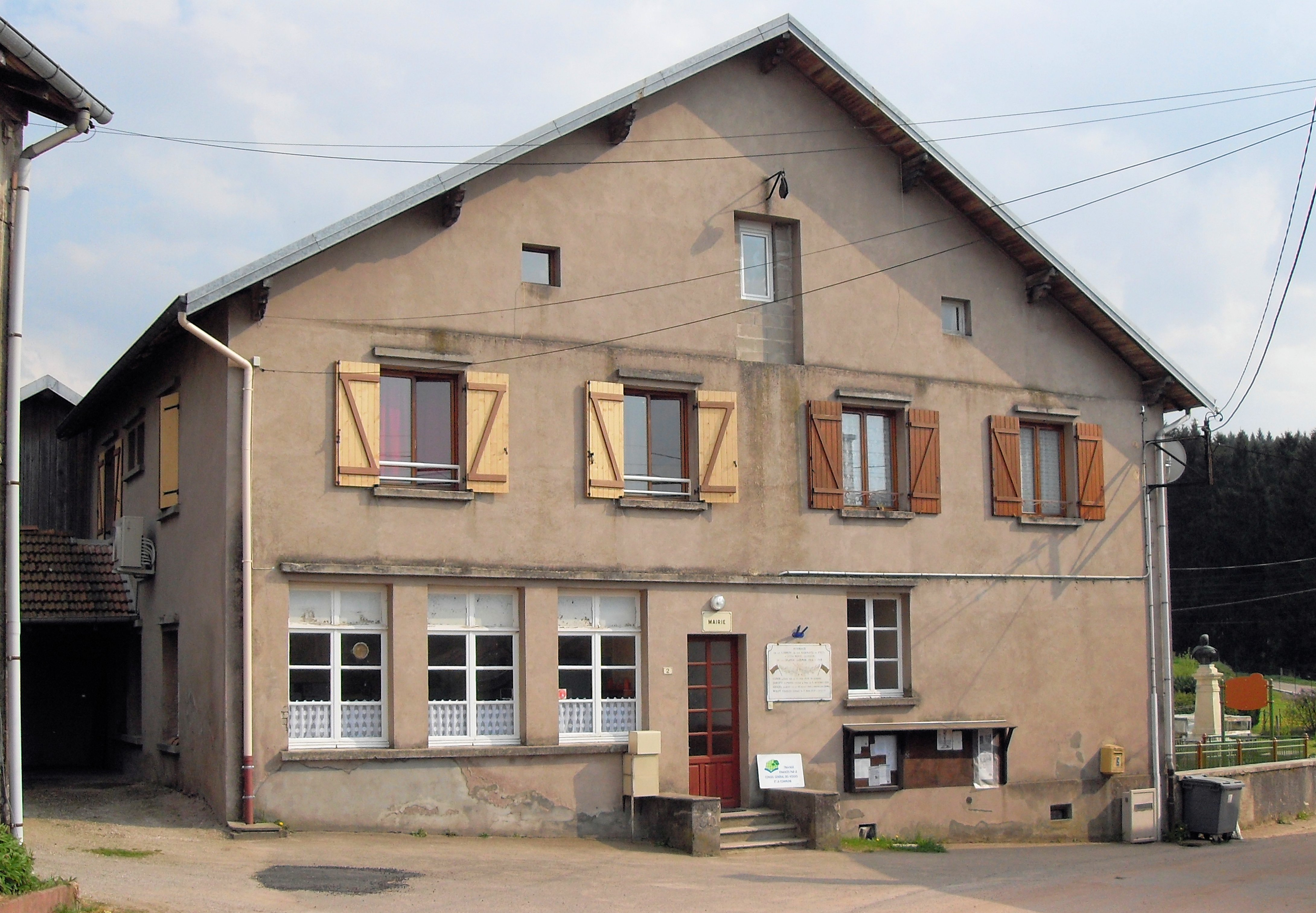
- The town hall in Prey
- Location of Prey
- Location within France Location within Grand Est
- Coordinates: 48°10′47″N 6°41′09″E
- Country: France
- Region: Grand Est
- Department: Vosges
- Arrondissement: Saint-Dié-des-Vosges
- Canton: Bruyères
- Intercommunality: CC Bruyères - Vallons des Vosges

Government
  - Mayor (2020–2026): Francis Haas
- Area^{1}: 2.13 km^{2} (0.82 sq mi)
- Highest elevation: 632 m (2,073 ft)
- Lowest elevation: 404 m (1,325 ft)
- Population (2023): 88
  - Density: 41/km^{2} (110/sq mi)
- Time zone: UTC+01:00 (CET)
  - Summer (DST): UTC+02:00 (CEST)
- INSEE/Postal code: 88359 /88600
- ^{1} French Land Register data, which excludes lakes, ponds, glaciers > 1 km^{2} (0.386 sq mi or 247 acres) and river estuaries.

Prey (French pronunciation: [pʁɛ]) is a commune in the Vosges department in Grand Est in northeastern France.

== Geography ==
Prey is a small rural commune positioned halfway between Bruyères and Docelles.

== Distinguished son ==
Jean Antoine Villemin 1827 - 1892 who identified the infectious nature of tuberculosis in his publication "études sur la tuberculose", was born at Prey. Mainstream medicine was slow to recognise the significance of Villemin's work.

Villemin is also credited with having invented the term "antibiotique" (antibiotic), though this assertion is contested by some English speakers who say the term was first coined only in the twentieth century by a Ukrainian American named Selman Waksman.

== See also ==
- Communes of the Vosges department
