= Luc Tartar =

French-American mathematician

Luc C. Tartar is a French-American mathematician currently the University Professor of Mathematics, Emeritus at Carnegie Mellon University.
