= Adrien Douady =

French mathematician (1935–2006)

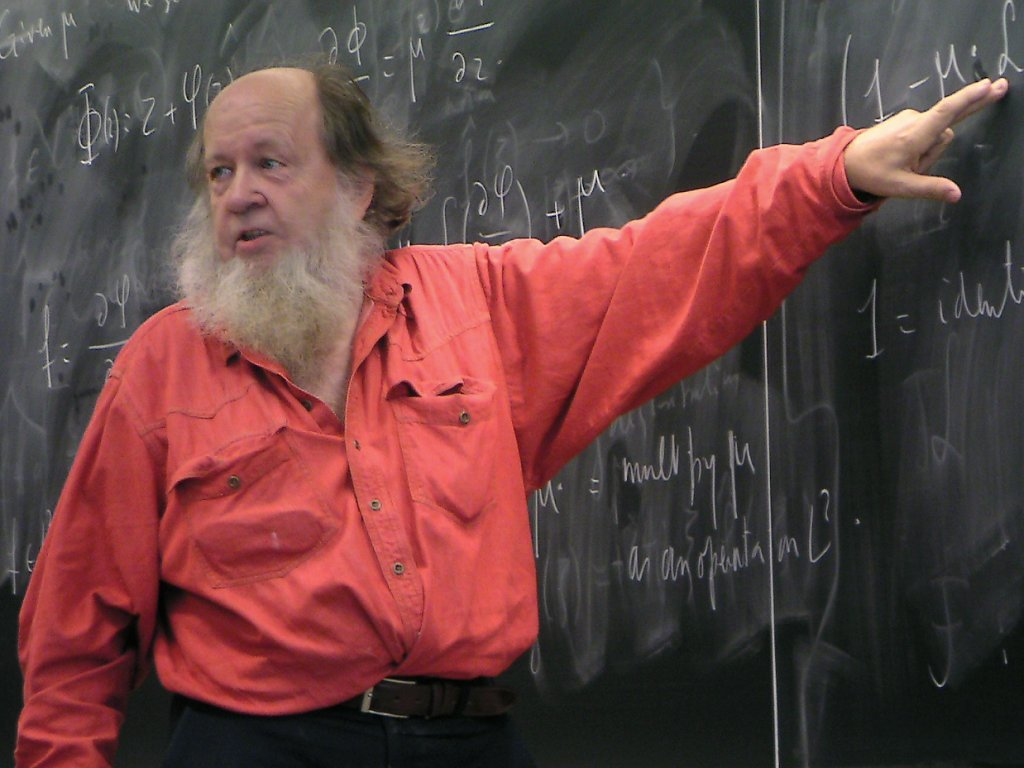
- Douady in 2003
- Born: 25 September 1935; La Tronche, Isère, France
- Died: 2 November 2006 (aged 71); Saint-Raphaël, Var, France
- Education: École normale supérieure
- Known for: Douady rabbit Douady–Earle extension Mandelbrot set
- Awards: Ampère Prize (1989)
- Scientific career
- Fields: Mathematics
- Workplaces: Paris-Sud 11 University
- Doctoral advisor: Henri Cartan
- Doctoral students: Tan Lei; Xavier Buff; John H. Hubbard

Adrien Douady (French: [adʁijɛ̃ dwadi]; 25 September 1935 – 2 November 2006) was a French mathematician born in La Tronche, Isère. He was the son of Daniel Douady and Guilhen Douady.

Douady was a student of Henri Cartan at the École normale supérieure, and initially worked in homological algebra. His thesis concerned deformations of complex analytic spaces. Subsequently, he became more interested in the work of Pierre Fatou and Gaston Julia and made significant contributions to the fields of analytic geometry and dynamical systems. Together with his former student John H. Hubbard, he launched a new subject, and a new school, studying properties of iterated quadratic complex mappings. They made important mathematical contributions in this field of complex dynamics, including a study of the Mandelbrot set. One of their most fundamental results is that the Mandelbrot set is connected; perhaps most important is their theory of renormalization of (polynomial-like) maps. The Douady rabbit, a quadratic filled Julia set, is named after him.

Douady taught at the University of Nice and was a professor at the Paris-Sud 11 University, Orsay. He was a member of Bourbaki and an invited speaker at the International Congress of Mathematicians in 1966 at Moscow and again in 1986 in Berkeley.

He was elected to the Académie des Sciences in 1997, and was featured in the French animation project Dimensions.

He died after diving into the cold Mediterranean from a favourite spot near his vacation home in the Var.

His son, Raphael Douady, is also a noted mathematician and an economist.

== See also ==
- Beltrami equation
- Jessen's icosahedron
- Kuiper's theorem
