= Barbara Burke Hubbard =

American science writer

Barbara Burke Hubbard (born 1948) is an American science journalist, mathematics popularizer, textbook author, and book publisher, known for her books on wavelet transforms and multivariable calculus.

== Life ==
Burke Hubbard is the daughter of Los Angeles Times reporter Vincent J. Burke, and spent a year in high school living in Moscow when Burke was stationed there in 1964. She was an undergraduate at Harvard University, initially majoring in biology but switching to English, and graduating in 1969. She became a science writer for the Massachusetts Institute of Technology and a journalist for The Ithaca Journal, and was the 1981 winner of the AAAS Westinghouse Science Journalism Award in the small newspaper category, for her articles on acid rain in The Ithaca Journal.

She married mathematician John H. Hubbard, with whom she has four children, and with her family has split her time between Ithaca, New York, and Marseille, France, with shorter-term stays elsewhere.

== Books ==
Burke Hubbard is the author of a popular mathematics book on wavelet transforms, originally published in French as Ondes et ondelettes: la saga d’un outil mathématique (Pour la Science, 1995). It won the Prix d'Alembert of the Société mathématique de France, and Hubbard became the first winner of this prize who was not French. The English edition of the same book, The world according to wavelets: the story of a mathematical technique in the making, was published in 1996 by A K Peters, with a second edition in 1998. It was also translated into German by M. Basler as Wavelets: Die Mathematik der kleinen Wellen (Birkhäuser, 1997). With her husband, she wrote a textbook on multivariate calculus, Vector calculus, linear algebra, and differential forms: A unified approach (Prentice Hall, 1999; 5th ed., 2015). She has also translated the book Biochronological correlations by Jean Guex from French into English.

In 2001, Burke Hubbard founded the mathematics book publisher Matrix Editions.
