= Xavier Buff =

French mathematician (born 1971)

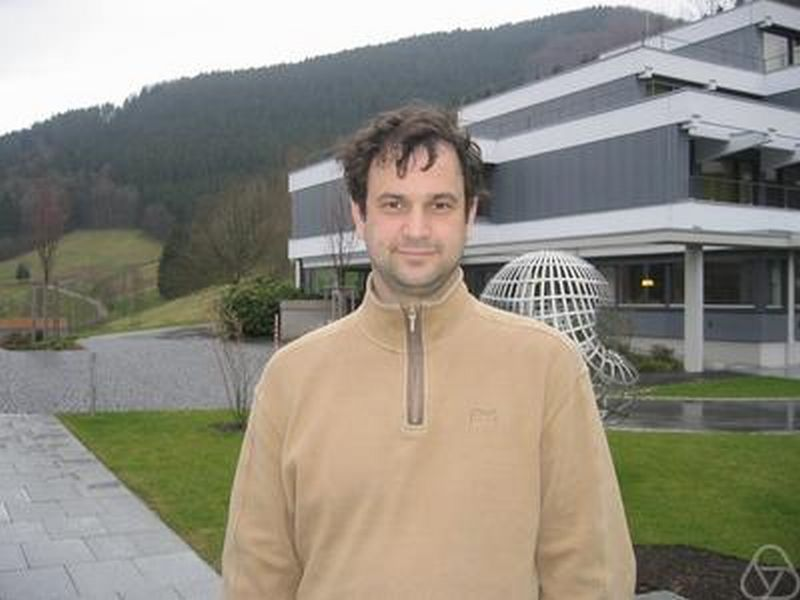
- Xavier Buff, Oberwolfach 2008
- Born: December 16, 1971 (age 54)
- Education: University of Paris-Sud
- Occupation: Mathematician

Xavier Buff (born 16 December 1971) is a French mathematician, specializing in dynamical systems.

Buff received in 1996 his Ph.D. (promotion) from the University of Paris-Sud under Adrien Douady with thesis Points fixe de renormalisation. As a postdoc he was in the academic year 1997–1998 the H. C. Wang Assistant Professor at Cornell University. At the Paul Sabatier University (Université Toulouse III) he became in 1998 a maître de conférences, achieved in 2006 his habilitation with habilitation thesis Disques de Siegel et ensembles de Julia d'aire strictement positive, and became in 2008 a full professor.

In 2010 he was an invited speaker at the International Congress of Mathematicians in Hyderabad and gave a talk Quadratic Julia Sets with Positive Area based on joint work with Arnaud Chéritat. In 2006 Buff and Chéritat received the Prix Leconte of the French Academy of Sciences for their collaborative work on Julia sets with positive mass; they proved the existence of quadratic polynomials that have positive Lebesgue measure. In 2008 Buff, Chéritat, and Pascale Roesch received a Young Researchers grant from Agence Nationale de la Recherche. In 2009 Buff became a member of the Institut Universitaire de France.

== Selected publications ==
- with A. Chéritat: Quadratic Julia sets with positive area, Annals of Mathematics, vol. 176, 2012, pp. 673–746
- with A. Chéritat: A new proof of a conjecture of Yoccoz, Annales de l’institut Fourier, vol. 61, 2011, pp. 319–350
- with A. Chéritat: The Brjuno function continuously estimates the size of quadratic Siegel disks, Annals of Mathematics, vol. 164, 2006, pp. 265–312
- with A. Chéritat: Upper Bound for the Size of Quadratic Siegel Disks, Inventiones Mathematicae, vol. 156, 2004, pp. 1–24 doi:10.1007/s00222-003-0331-6
- with C. Henriksen: Julia sets in parameter spaces, Communications in Mathematical Physics, vol. 220, 2001, pp. 333–375 doi:10.1007/PL00005568
- with A. Chéritat: Ensembles de Julia quadratiques de mesure de Lebesgue strictement positive, C. R. Acad. Sci. Paris, vol. 341, 2005, pp. 669–674 doi:10.1016/j.crma.2005.10.001
- with Leila Schneps, Jérôme Fehrenbach, Pierre Lochak, Pierre Vogel: Moduli Spaces of Curves, Mapping Class Groups and Field Theory, AMS and SMF 2003
