= Quadrat (disambiguation) =

A quadrat, in ecology and geography, is a frame used to isolate an area for study.

Quadrat may also refer to:

- Quadrat (hieroglyph block), a virtual rectangle or square in Egyptian hieroglyphic text
- Quadrat (patience), a solitaire card game
- Quad (typography), originally quadrat, a metal spacer used in letterpress typesetting

== See also ==
- Quadrate (disambiguation)
- Quadratic (disambiguation)
- Quadrant (disambiguation)
