= Quadrant =

Quadrant may refer to:

== Companies ==
- Quadrant Cycle Company, 1899 manufacturers in Britain of the Quadrant motorcar
- Quadrant (motorcycles), one of the earliest British motorcycle manufacturers, established in Birmingham in 1901
- Quadrant Private Equity, an Australian investment firm
- Quadrant Records, an independent record label
- Quadrant Televentures Ltd., a subsidiary of Videocon Telecom, India

== Geography ==
- A quadrant or section in a city street nomenclature system, see Address (geography)#Quadrants
- Quadrants of Washington, D.C.

== Mathematics ==
- Quadrant (circle), a circular sector equal to one-quarter of a circle
- Quadrant (plane geometry), a sector of a two-dimensional Cartesian coordinate system
- Quadrant (solid geometry)

== Military ==
- HMAS Quadrant (G11), a Second World War British/Australian warship
- First Quebec Conference, 1943 (codenamed "QUADRANT")
- The quadrant sight, an M203 grenade launcher assembly attachment that gets inserted on the left side of the carrying handle on M16 rifles.

== Science and technology ==
- Galactic quadrant, one out of four circular sectors in the division of the Milky Way galaxy
- Quadrant (abdomen), a division of the abdominal cavity
- Quadrant (architecture) a curve in a wall or vaulted ceiling of a building
- Quadrant (instrument), an angle or time-measuring instrument
- Quadrant (semigraphics), a 2×2 semigraphical pixel array in computing

== Places ==
- Quadrant Bus Station, Swansea Wales
- Quadrant:MK, Network Rail's headquarters campus in Milton Keynes
- Quadrant Park, a nightclub in Liverpool, Merseyside
- Quadrant Shopping Centre, Swansea, Wales
- The Quadrant, a housing estate in Kingston upon Hull, UK

== Other ==
- Quadrant (album), a 1977 album by Joe Pass and Milt Jackson
- Quadrant (college basketball), a performance measure derived from the Rating Percentage Index
- Quadrant (magazine), an Australian literary, cultural and centre-right political journal
- Triumph Quadrant, a four-cylinder motorcycle
- A division of dentition - see Glossary of dentistry
- Team Quadrant, a video content, apparel and esports team created by Formula One driver Lando Norris
