= Quadratic =

In mathematics, the term quadratic describes something that pertains to squares, to the operation of squaring, to terms of the second degree, or equations or formulas that involve such terms. Quadratus is Latin for square.

== Mathematics ==
=== Algebra (elementary and abstract) ===
- Quadratic function (or quadratic polynomial), a polynomial function that contains terms of at most second degree
  - Complex quadratic polynomials, are particularly interesting for their sometimes chaotic properties under iteration
- Quadratic equation, a polynomial equation of degree 2 (reducible to 0 = ax^{2} + bx + c)
- Quadratic formula, calculation to solve a quadratic equation for the independent variable (x)
- Quadratic field, an algebraic number field of degree two over the field of rational numbers
- Quadratic irrational or "quadratic surd", an irrational number that is a root of a quadratic polynomial

=== Calculus ===
- Quadratic integral, the integral of the reciprocal of a second-degree polynomial

=== Statistics and stochastics ===
- Quadratic form (statistics), scalar quantity ε'Λε for an n-dimensional square matrix
- Quadratic mean, the square root of the mean of the squares of the data
- Quadratic variation, in stochastics, useful for the analysis of Brownian motion and martingales

=== Number theory ===
- Quadratic reciprocity, a theorem from number theory
- Quadratic residue, an integer that is a square modulo n
- Quadratic sieve, a modern integer factorization algorithm

=== Other mathematics ===
- Quadratic convergence, in which the distance to a convergent sequence's limit is squared at each step
- Quadratic differential, a form on a Riemann surface that locally looks like the square of an abelian differential
- Quadratic form, a homogeneous polynomial of degree two in any number of variables
- Quadratic programming, a special type of mathematical optimization problem
- Quadratic growth, an asymptotic growth rate proportional to a quadratic function
- Periodic points of complex quadratic mappings, a type of graph that can be used to explore stability in control systems
- Quadratic Bézier curve, a type of Bézier curve

== Computer science ==
- Quadratic probing, a scheme in computer programming for resolving collisions in hash tables
- Quadratic classifier, used in machine learning to separate measurements of two or more classes of objects
- Quadratic time, in referring to algorithms with quadratic time complexity

== Other ==
- Quadratic (collection), a 1953 collection of science fiction novels by Olaf Stapledon and Murray Leinster

== See also ==
- Cubic (disambiguation), relating to a cube or degree 3, as next higher above quadratic
- Linear, relating to a line or degree 1, as next lower below quadratic
- Quad (disambiguation)
- Quadratic transformation (disambiguation)
