= Complex squaring map =

In mathematics, the complex squaring map, a polynomial mapping of degree two, is a simple and accessible demonstration of chaos in dynamical systems. It can be constructed by performing the following steps:

1. Choose any complex number on the unit circle whose argument (angle) is not a rational multiple of π,
2. Repeatedly square that number.

This repetition (iteration) produces a sequence of complex numbers that can be described alone by their arguments. Any choice of starting angle that satisfies (1) above will produce an extremely complicated sequence of angles, that belies the simplicity of the steps. It can be shown that the sequence will be chaotic, i.e. it is sensitive to the detailed choice of starting angle.

== Chaos and the complex squaring map ==
The informal reason why the iteration is chaotic is that the angle doubles on every iteration and doubling grows very quickly as the angle becomes ever larger, but angles which differ by multiples of 2π (radians) are identical. Thus, when the angle exceeds 2π, it must wrap to the remainder on division by 2π. Therefore, the angle is transformed according to the dyadic transformation (also known as the 2x mod 1 map). As the initial value z_{0} has been chosen so that its argument is not a rational multiple of π, the forward orbit of z_{n} cannot repeat itself and become periodic.

More formally, the iteration can be written as

$$z_{n+1} = z_n^2$$

where $z_n$ is the resulting sequence of complex numbers obtained by iterating the steps above, and $z_0$ represents the initial starting number. We can solve this iteration exactly:

$$z_n = z_0^{2^n}$$

Starting with angle θ, we can write the initial term as $z_0 = \exp(i\theta)$ so that $z_n = \exp(i2^n\theta)$. This makes the successive doubling of the angle clear. (This is equivalent to the relation $z_n = \cos(2^n\theta)+i \sin(2^n\theta)$ by Euler's formula.)

== Generalisations ==
This map is a special case of the complex quadratic map, which has exact solutions for many special cases. The complex map obtained by raising the previous number to any natural number power $z_{n+1} = z_n^p$ is also exactly solvable as $z_n = z_0^{p^n}$. In the case p = 2, the dynamics can be mapped to the dyadic transformation, as described above, but for p > 2, we obtain a shift map in the number base p. For example, p = 10 is a decimal shift map.

== See also ==
- Logistic map
- Dyadic transformation
