= Quadrate =

Quadrate may refer to:

- Quadrate bone
- Quadrate (heraldry)
- Quadrate lobe of liver
- Quadrate tubercle of femur

== See also ==
- Quadrat (disambiguation)
