= Periodic points of complex quadratic mappings =

This article describes periodic points of some complex quadratic maps. A map is a formula for computing a value of a variable based on its own previous value or values; a quadratic map is one that involves the previous value raised to the powers one and two; and a complex map is one in which the variable and the parameters are complex numbers. A periodic point of a map is a value of the variable that occurs repeatedly after intervals of a fixed length.

These periodic points play a role in the theories of Fatou and Julia sets.

== Definitions ==
Let

$$f_c(z) = z^2+c\,$$

be the complex quadratic mapping, where $z$ and $c$ are complex numbers.

Notationally, $f^{(k)} _c (z)$ is the $k$-fold composition of $f_c$ with itself (not to be confused with the $k$th derivative of $f_c$)—that is, the value after the k-th iteration of the function $f _c.$ Thus

$$f^{(k)} _c (z) = f_c(f^{(k-1)} _c (z)).$$

Periodic points of a complex quadratic mapping of period $p$ are points $z$ of the dynamical plane such that

$$f^{(p)} _c (z) = z,$$

where $p$ is the smallest positive integer for which the equation holds at that z.

We can introduce a new function:

$$F_p(z,f) = f^{(p)} _c (z) - z,$$

so periodic points are zeros of function $F_p(z,f)$: points z satisfying

$$F_p(z,f) = 0,$$

which is a polynomial of degree $2^p.$

== Number of periodic points ==
The degree of the polynomial $F_p(z,f)$ describing periodic points is $d = 2^p$ so it has exactly $d = 2^p$ complex roots (= periodic points), counted with multiplicity.

== Stability of periodic points (orbit) - multiplier ==
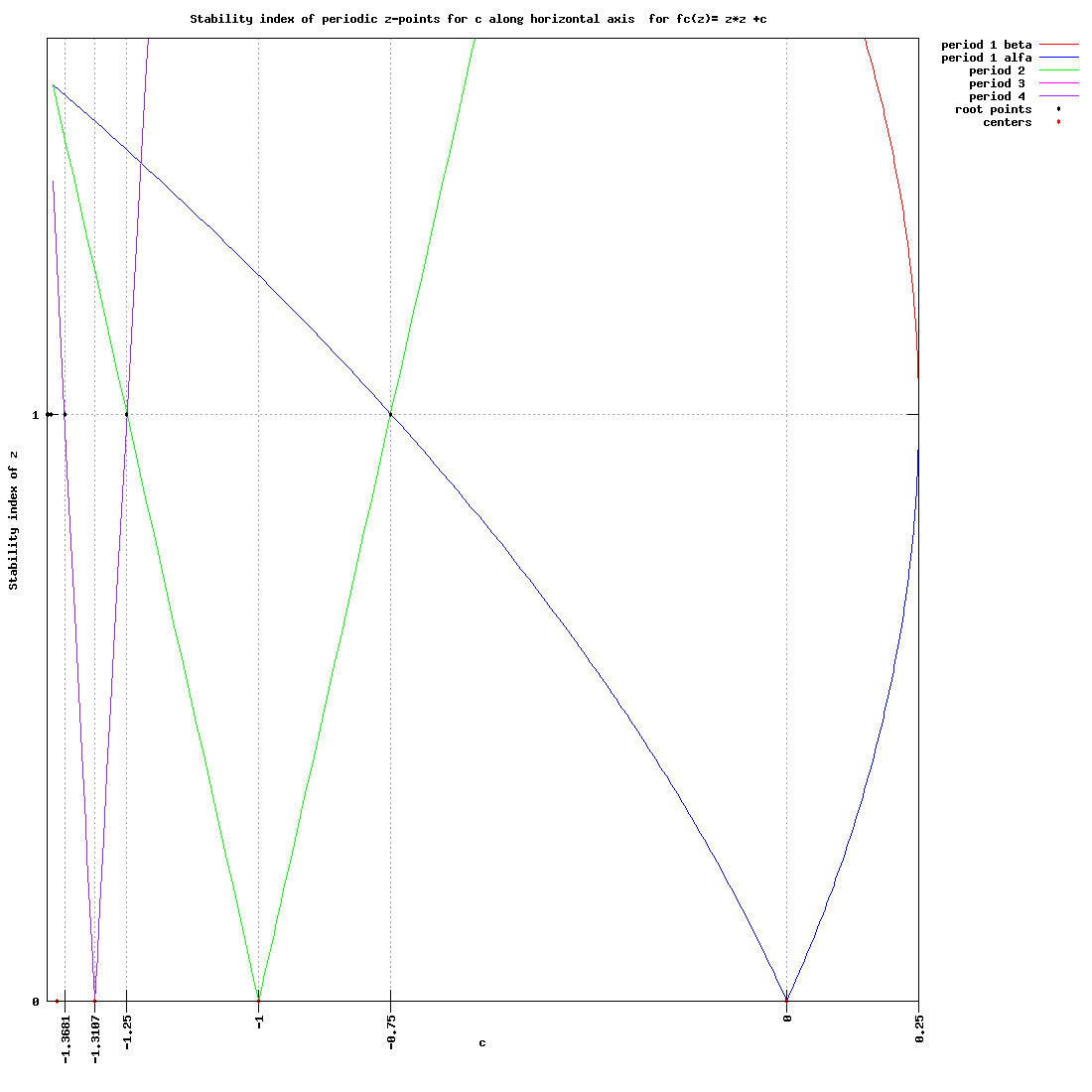
Stability index of periodic points along horizontal axis

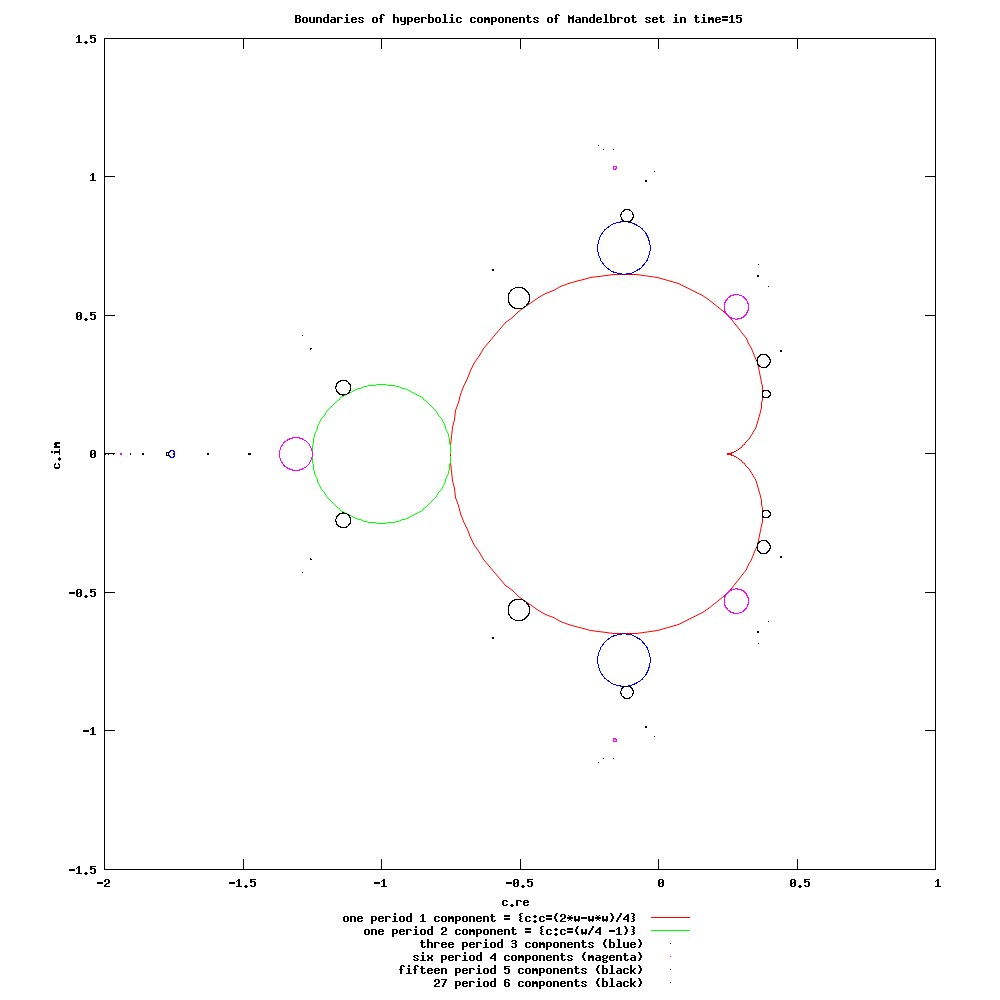
boundaries of regions of parameter plane with attracting orbit of periods 1-6

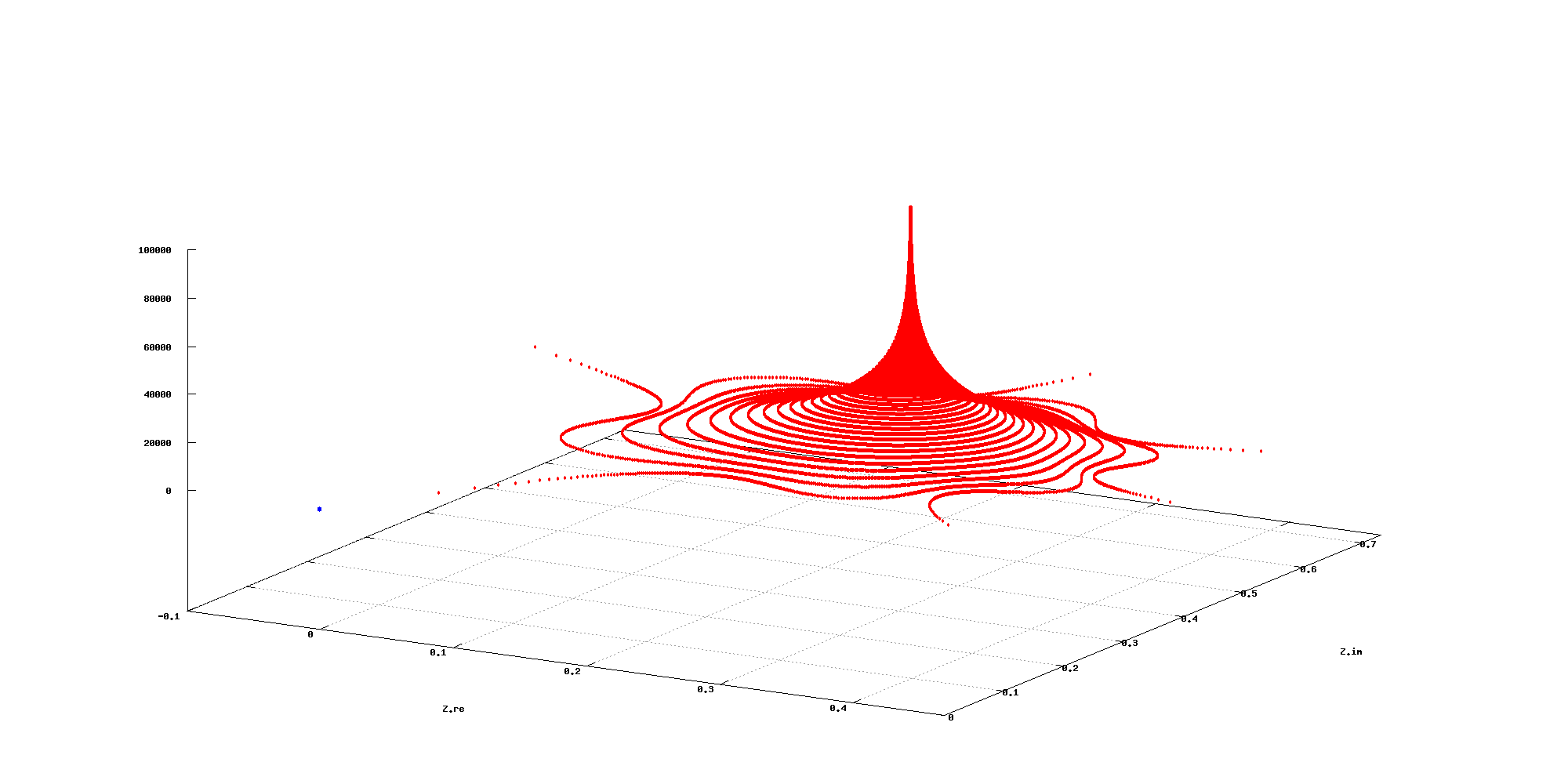
Critical orbit of discrete dynamical system based on complex quadratic polynomial. It tends to weakly attracting fixed point with abs(multiplier) = 0.99993612384259

The multiplier (or eigenvalue, derivative) $m(f^p,z_0)=\lambda$ of a rational map $f$ iterated $p$ times at cyclic point $z_0$ is defined as:

$$m(f^p,z_0) = \lambda = \begin{cases}
f^{p \prime}(z_0), &\mbox{if }z_0 \ne \infty \\
\frac{1}{f^{p \prime} (z_0)}, & \mbox{if }z_0 = \infty \end{cases}$$

where $f^{p\prime} (z_0)$ is the first derivative of $f^p$ with respect to $z$ at $z_0$.

Because the multiplier is the same at all periodic points on a given orbit, it is called a multiplier of the periodic orbit.

The multiplier is:

- a complex number;
- invariant under conjugation of any rational map at its fixed point;
- used to check stability of periodic (also fixed) points with stability index $abs(\lambda). \,$

A periodic point is

- attracting when $abs(\lambda) < 1;$
  - super-attracting when $abs(\lambda) = 0;$
  - attracting but not super-attracting when $0 < abs(\lambda) < 1;$
- indifferent when $abs(\lambda) = 1;$
  - rationally indifferent or parabolic if $\lambda$ is a root of unity;
  - irrationally indifferent if $abs(\lambda)=1$ but multiplier is not a root of unity;
- repelling when $abs(\lambda) > 1.$

Periodic points

- that are attracting are always in the Fatou set;
- that are repelling are in the Julia set;
- that are indifferent fixed points may be in one or the other. A parabolic periodic point is in the Julia set.

== Period-1 points (fixed points) ==
=== Finite fixed points ===
Let us begin by finding all finite points left unchanged by one application of $f$. These are the points that satisfy $f_c(z)=z$. That is, we wish to solve

$$z^2+c=z,\,$$

which can be rewritten as

$$\ z^2-z+c=0.$$

Since this is an ordinary quadratic equation in one unknown, we can apply the standard quadratic solution formula:

$\alpha_1 = \frac{1-\sqrt{1-4c}}{2}$ and $\alpha_2 = \frac{1+\sqrt{1-4c}}{2}.$

So for $c \in \mathbb{C} \setminus \{1/4\}$ we have two finite fixed points $\alpha_1$ and $\alpha_2$.

Since

$\alpha_1 = \frac{1}{2}-m$ and $\alpha_2 = \frac{1}{2}+m$ where $m = \frac{\sqrt{1-4c}}{2},$

we have $\alpha_1 + \alpha_2 = 1$.

Thus fixed points are symmetrical about $z = 1/2$.

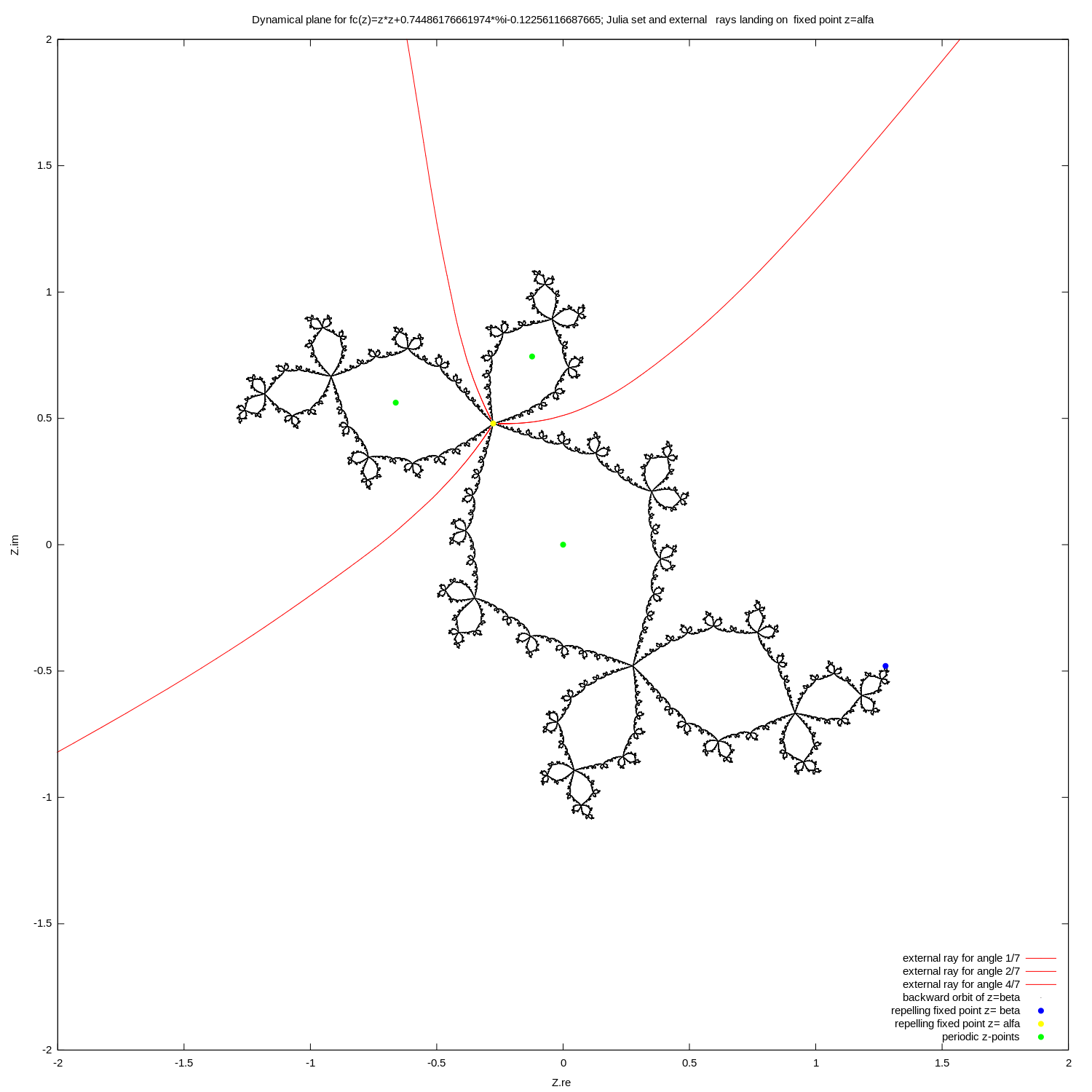
This image shows fixed points (both repelling)

==== Complex dynamics ====
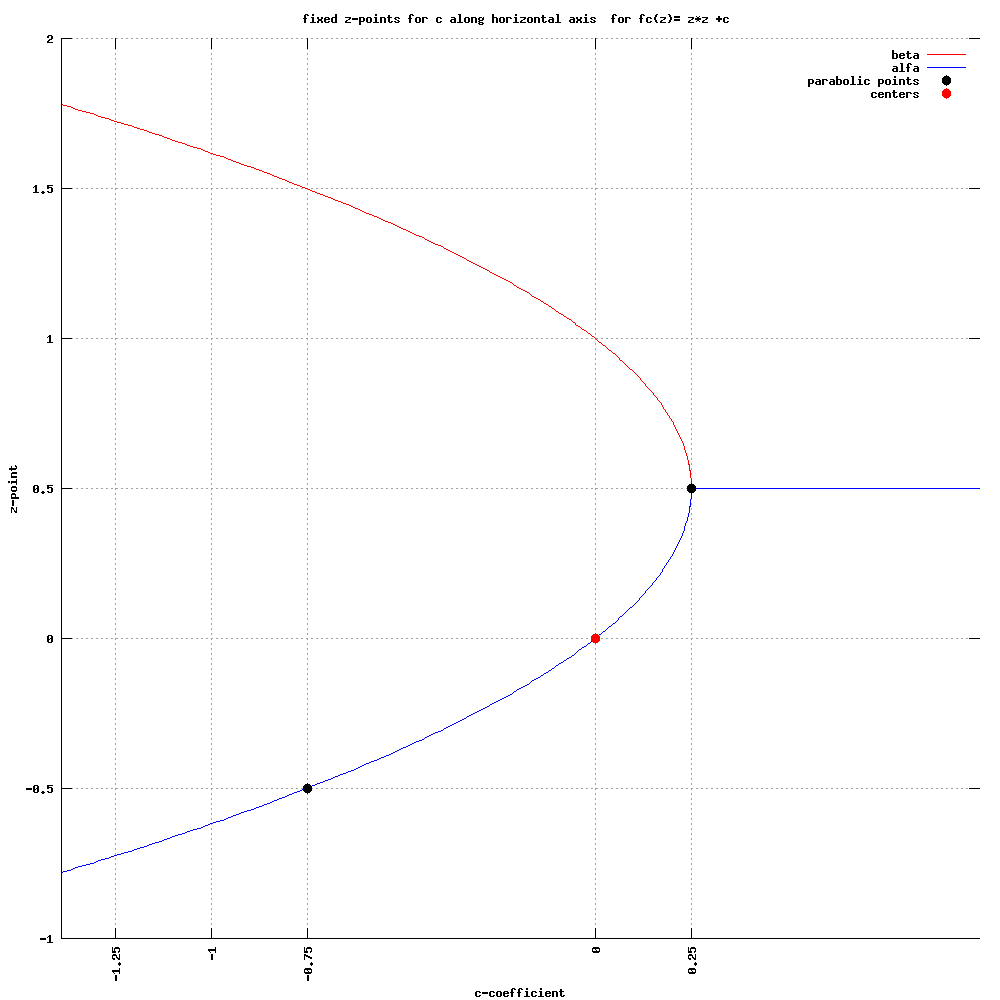
Fixed points for c along horizontal axis

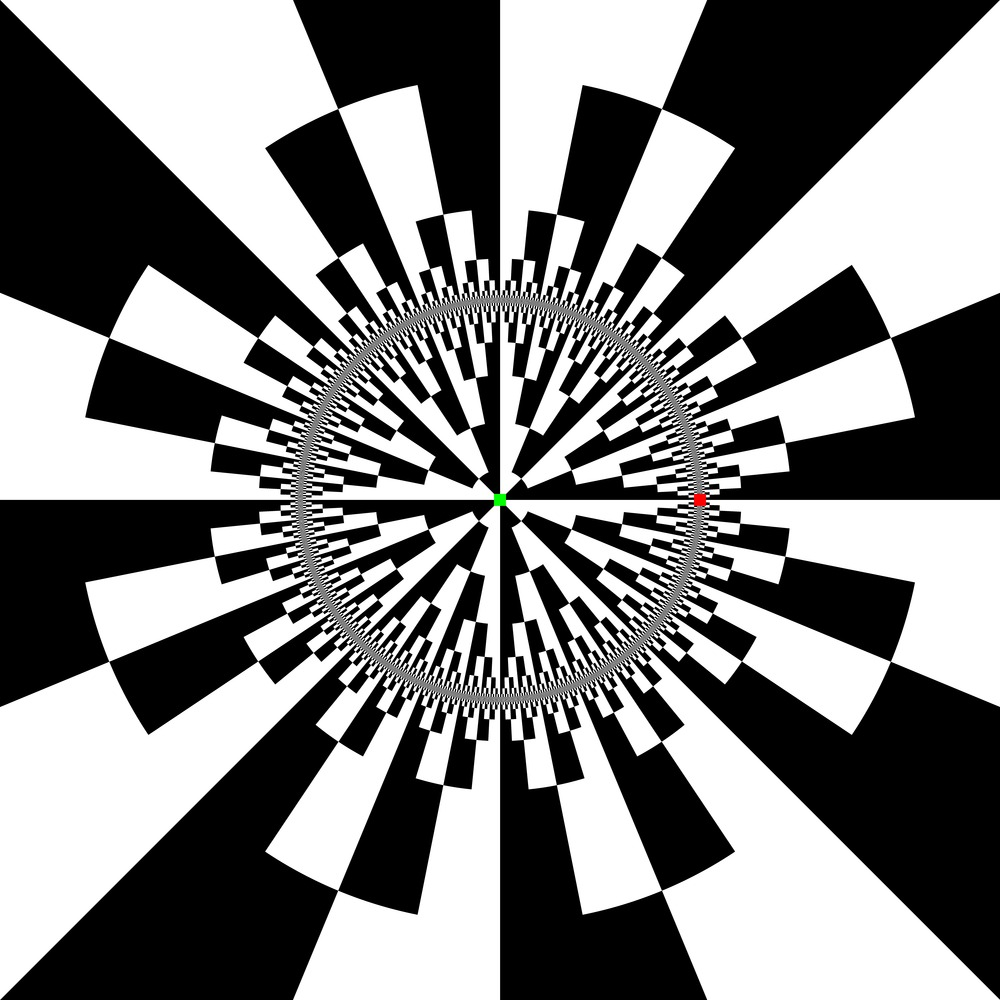
Fatou set for F(z) = z*z with marked fixed point

Here different notation is commonly used:

$\alpha_c = \frac{1-\sqrt{1-4c}}{2}$ with multiplier $\lambda_{\alpha_c} = 1-\sqrt{1-4c}$

and

$\beta_c = \frac{1+\sqrt{1-4c}}{2}$ with multiplier $\lambda_{\beta_c} = 1+\sqrt{1-4c}.$

Again we have

$$\alpha_c + \beta_c = 1 .$$

Since the derivative with respect to z is

$$P_c'(z) = \frac{d}{dz}P_c(z) = 2z ,$$

we have

$$P_c'(\alpha_c) + P_c'(\beta_c)= 2 \alpha_c + 2 \beta_c = 2 (\alpha_c + \beta_c) = 2 .$$

This implies that $P_c$ can have at most one attractive fixed point.

These points are distinguished by the facts that:

- $\beta_c$ is:
  - the landing point of the external ray for angle=0 for $c \in M \setminus \left\{ 1/4 \right\}$
  - the most repelling fixed point of the Julia set
  - the one on the right (whenever fixed point are not symmetrical around the real axis), it is the extreme right point for connected Julia sets (except for cauliflower).
- $\alpha_c$ is:
  - the landing point of several rays
  - attracting when $c$ is in the main cardioid of the Mandelbrot set, in which case it is in the interior of a filled-in Julia set, and therefore belongs to the Fatou set (strictly to the basin of attraction of finite fixed point)
  - parabolic at the root point of the limb of the Mandelbrot set
  - repelling for other values of $c$

==== Special cases ====
An important case of the quadratic mapping is $c=0$. In this case, we get $\alpha_1 = 0$ and $\alpha_2=1$. In this case, 0 is a superattractive fixed point, and 1 belongs to the Julia set.

==== Only one fixed point ====
We have $\alpha_1=\alpha_2$ exactly when $1-4c=0.$ This equation has one solution, $c=1/4,$ in which case $\alpha_1=\alpha_2=1/2$. In fact $c=1/4$ is the largest positive, purely real value for which a finite attractor exists.

=== Infinite fixed point ===
We can extend the complex plane $\mathbb{C}$ to the Riemann sphere (extended complex plane) $\mathbb{\hat{C}}$ by adding infinity:

$$\mathbb{\hat{C}} = \mathbb{C} \cup \{ \infty \}$$

and extend $f_c$ such that $f_c(\infty)=\infty.$

Then infinity is:

- superattracting
- a fixed point of $f_c$:
  $$f_c(\infty)=\infty=f^{-1}_c(\infty).$$

== Period-2 cycles ==
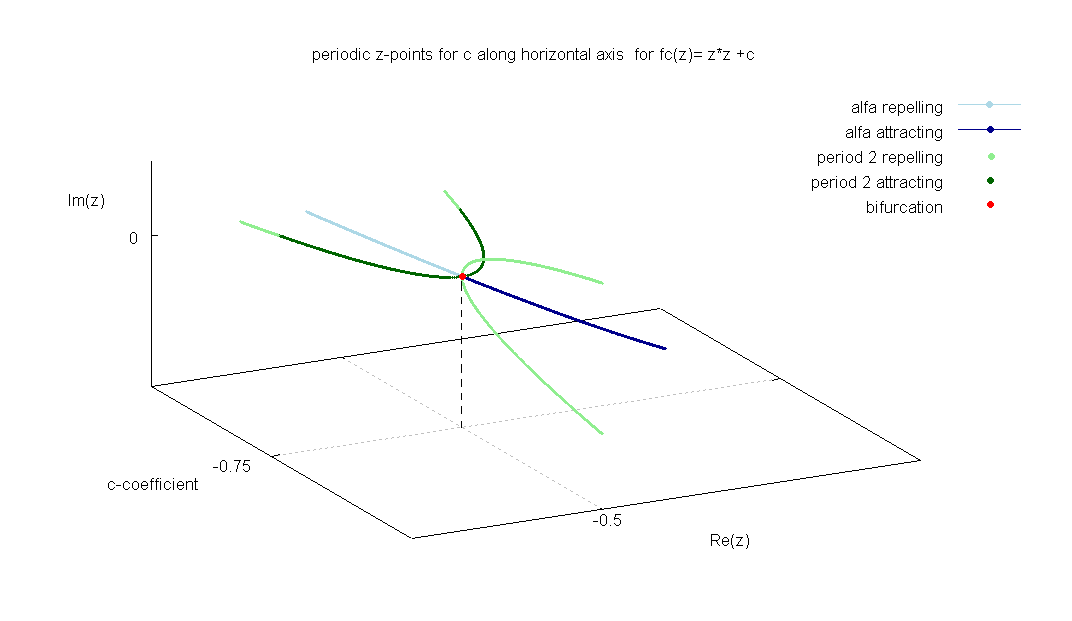
Bifurcation from period 1 to 2 for complex quadratic map

Bifurcation of periodic points from period 1 to 2 for fc(z)=z*z +c

Period-2 cycles are two distinct points $\beta_1$ and $\beta_2$ such that $f_c(\beta_1) = \beta_2$ and $f_c(\beta_2) = \beta_1$, and hence

$$f_c(f_c(\beta_n)) = \beta_n$$

for $n \in \{1, 2\}$:

$$f_c(f_c(z)) = (z^2+c)^2+c = z^4 + 2cz^2 + c^2 + c.$$

Equating this to z, we obtain

$$z^4 + 2cz^2 - z + c^2 + c = 0.$$

This equation is a polynomial of degree 4, and so has four (possibly non-distinct) solutions. However, we already know two of the solutions. They are $\alpha_1$ and $\alpha_2$, computed above, since if these points are left unchanged by one application of $f$, then clearly they will be unchanged by more than one application of $f$.

Our 4th-order polynomial can therefore be factored in 2 ways:

=== First method of factorization ===
$$(z-\alpha_1)(z-\alpha_2)(z-\beta_1)(z-\beta_2) = 0.\,$$

This expands directly as $x^4 - Ax^3 + Bx^2 - Cx + D = 0$ (note the alternating signs), where

$$D = \alpha_1 \alpha_2 \beta_1 \beta_2, \,$$

$$C = \alpha_1 \alpha_2 \beta_1 + \alpha_1 \alpha_2 \beta_2 + \alpha_1 \beta_1 \beta_2 + \alpha_2 \beta_1 \beta_2, \,$$

$$B = \alpha_1 \alpha_2 + \alpha_1 \beta_1 + \alpha_1 \beta_2 + \alpha_2 \beta_1 + \alpha_2 \beta_2 + \beta_1 \beta_2, \,$$

$$A = \alpha_1 + \alpha_2 + \beta_1 + \beta_2.\,$$

We already have two solutions, and only need the other two. Hence the problem is equivalent to solving a quadratic polynomial. In particular, note that

$$\alpha_1 + \alpha_2 = \frac{1-\sqrt{1-4c}}{2} + \frac{1+\sqrt{1-4c}}{2} = \frac{1+1}{2} = 1$$

and

$$\alpha_1 \alpha_2 = \frac{(1-\sqrt{1-4c})(1+\sqrt{1-4c})}{4} = \frac{1^2 - (\sqrt{1-4c})^2}{4}= \frac{1 - 1 + 4c}{4} = \frac{4c}{4} = c.$$

Adding these to the above, we get $D = c \beta_1 \beta_2$ and $A = 1 + \beta_1 + \beta_2$. Matching these against the coefficients from expanding $f$, we get

$D = c \beta_1 \beta_2 = c^2 + c$ and $A = 1 + \beta_1 + \beta_2 = 0.$

From this, we easily get

$\beta_1 \beta_2 = c + 1$ and $\beta_1 + \beta_2 = -1$.

From here, we construct a quadratic equation with $A' = 1, B = 1, C = c+1$ and apply the standard solution formula to get

$\beta_1 = \frac{-1 - \sqrt{-3 -4c}}{2}$ and $\beta_2 = \frac{-1 + \sqrt{-3 -4c}}{2}.$

Closer examination shows that:

$f_c(\beta_1) = \beta_2$ and $f_c(\beta_2) = \beta_1,$

meaning these two points are the two points on a single period-2 cycle.

=== Second method of factorization ===
We can factor the quartic by using polynomial long division to divide out the factors $(z-\alpha_1)$ and $(z-\alpha_2),$ which account for the two fixed points $\alpha_1$ and $\alpha_2$ (whose values were given earlier and which still remain at the fixed point after two iterations):

$$(z^2+c)^2 + c -z = (z^2 + c - z)(z^2 + z  + c +1 ). \,$$

The roots of the first factor are the two fixed points. They are repelling outside the main cardioid.

The second factor has the two roots

$$\frac{-1 \pm \sqrt{-3 -4c}}{2}. \,$$

These two roots, which are the same as those found by the first method, form the period-2 orbit.

==== Special cases ====
Again, let us look at $c=0$. Then

$\beta_1 = \frac{-1 - i\sqrt{3}}{2}$ and $\beta_2 = \frac{-1 + i\sqrt{3}}{2},$

both of which are complex numbers. We have $| \beta_1 | = | \beta_2 | = 1$. Thus, both these points are "hiding" in the Julia set. Another special case is $c=-1$, which gives $\beta_1 = 0$ and $\beta_2 = -1$. This gives the well-known superattractive cycle found in the largest period-2 lobe of the quadratic Mandelbrot set.

== Cycles for period greater than 2 ==
Periodic points of f(z) = z*z−0.75 for period =6 as intersections of 2 implicit curves

The degree of the equation $f^{(n)}(z)=z$ is 2^{n}; thus for example, to find the points on a 3-cycle we would need to solve an equation of degree 8. After factoring out the factors giving the two fixed points, we would have a sixth degree equation.

There is no general solution in radicals to polynomial equations of degree five or higher, so the points on a cycle of period greater than 2 must in general be computed using numerical methods. However, in the specific case of period 4 the cyclical points have lengthy expressions in radicals.

In the case c = –2, trigonometric solutions exist for the periodic points of all periods. The case $z_{n+1}=z_n^2-2$ is equivalent to the logistic map case r = 4: $x_{n+1}=4x_n(1-x_n).$ Here the equivalence is given by $z=2-4x.$ One of the k-cycles of the logistic variable x (all of which cycles are repelling) is

$$\sin^2\left(\frac{2\pi}{2^k-1}\right), \, \sin^2\left(2\cdot\frac{2\pi}{2^k-1}\right), \, \sin^2\left(2^2\cdot\frac{2\pi}{2^k-1}\right), \, \sin^2\left(2^3\cdot\frac{2\pi}{2^k-1}\right), \dots , \sin^2\left(2^{k-1}\frac{2\pi}{2^k-1}\right).$$
