= Quadrat (patience) =

Herz zu Herz
- A patience game
- Origin: Germany
- Type: Non-builder
- Deck: Single 32-card Skat pack or 52-card French pack
- Playing time: 1½ minutes (32 cards); 3 min (52 cards)
- Chance: High

Quadrat ("Square") or Viereck ("Rectangle") is a simple, German patience game, which is played with a French pack of 32 or 52 cards. Zudecken ("Covering") is a very similar patience with slightly altered rules.

== Rules ==
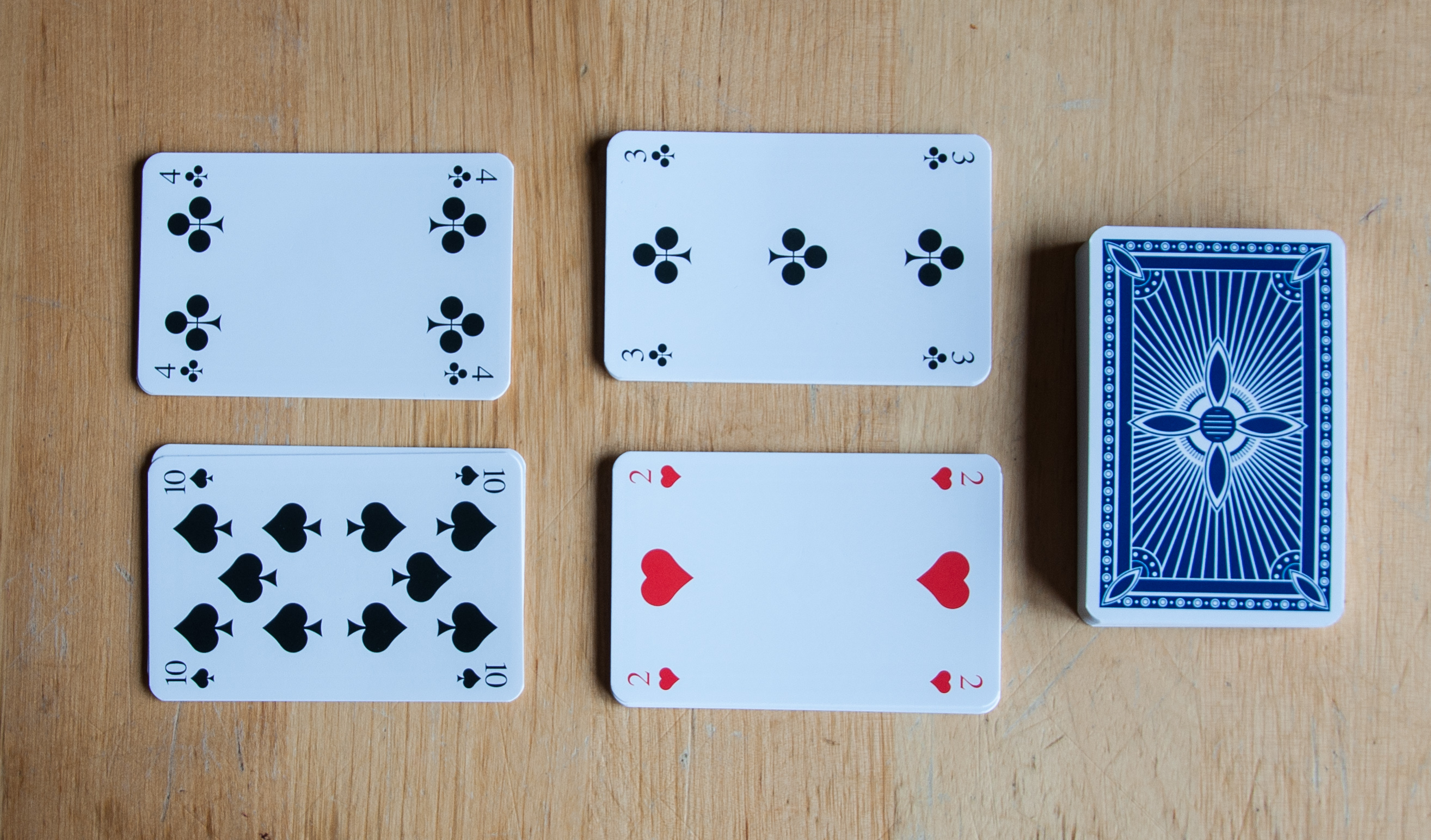
Quadrat under way: the two top cards are both in the suit of Clubs and may be covered or removed.

As with most patiences, Quadrat is a card game for one person. The cards, either a Skat pack of 32 or a single Rommé pack of 52 cards, are shuffled and placed face down as a stock in front of the player. The top four cards are picked up and placed face up on the table in a tableau the shape of a rectangle. If, in doing so, two of the cards turn out to have the same suit (clubs, spades, hearts or diamonds), the pair of cards is laid off to one side and replaced by two more cards from the stock. Alternatively the pairs may be covered by new cards. If three or four cards of the same suit surface at the same time, only two are removed; the third card remains in the tableau.

== Variant ==
The variant, Zudecken, is generally played with a 52-card deck. Here the cards are placed next to one another and, as soon as cards of the same suit or rank, e.g. two Jacks appear, they may be covered by fresh cards. In this way, three or even all four cards may be covered, if they match the other upcards in suit or rank.

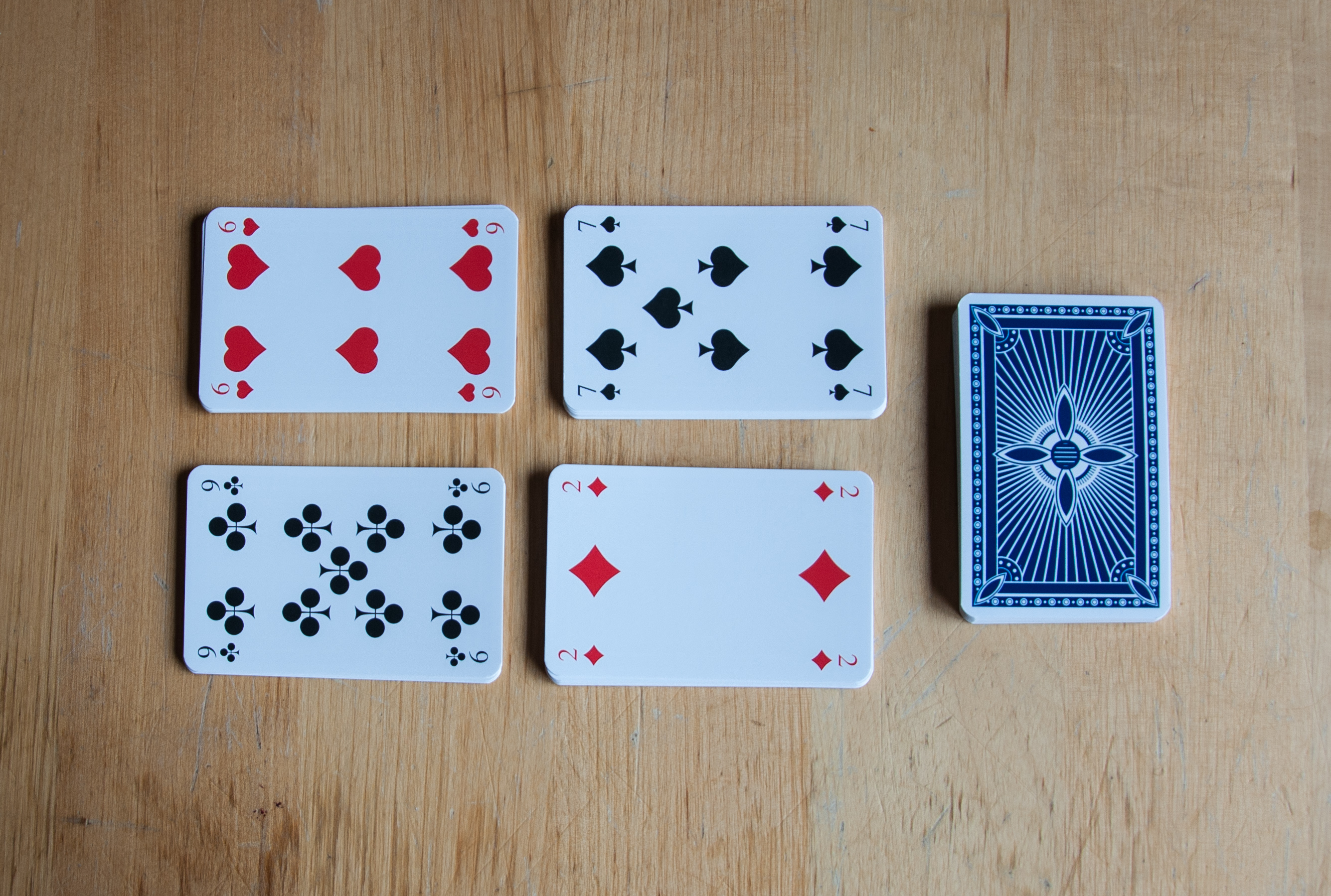
End of the game: there are no pairs left and the patience has not come out.

The game ends if there is one card of each suit in the tableau and thus no pairs can be removed or covered. In this case the game is lost; the patience has not 'come out'. The patience is only solved if the stock is completely used up and all the cards have been cleared.

== Literature ==
- Irmgard Wolter-Rosendorf: Patiencen in Wort und Bild. Falken-Verlag, 1994; pp 9. ISBN 3-8068-2003-1
- Robert E. Lembke: Das große Haus- und Familienbuch der Spiele. Lingen Verlag, Cologne; p. 193.
- Erhard Gorys: Das Buch der Spiele. Manfred Pawlak Verlagsgesellschaft, Herrsching; p. 121.
