= Orbit (dynamics) =

Set of points linked through the evolution function of a dynamical system

In mathematics, specifically in the study of dynamical systems, an orbit is a collection of points related by the evolution function of the dynamical system. It can be understood as the subset of phase space covered by the trajectory of the dynamical system under a particular set of initial conditions, as the system evolves. As a phase space trajectory is uniquely determined for any given set of phase space coordinates, it is not possible for different orbits to intersect in phase space, therefore the set of all orbits of a dynamical system is a partition of the phase space. Understanding the properties of orbits by using topological methods is one of the objectives of the modern theory of dynamical systems.

For discrete-time dynamical systems, the orbits are sequences; for real dynamical systems, the orbits are curves; and for holomorphic dynamical systems, the orbits are Riemann surfaces.

== Definition ==
Diagram showing the periodic orbit of a mass-spring system in simple harmonic motion. (Here the velocity and position axes have been reversed from the standard convention in order to align the two diagrams)

Given a dynamical system (T, M, Φ) with T a group, M a set and Φ the evolution function

$\Phi: U \to M$ where $U \subset T \times M$ with $\Phi(0,x)=x$

we define

$$I(x):=\{t \in T : (t,x) \in U \},$$

then the set

$$\gamma_x:=\{\Phi(t,x) : t \in I(x)\} \subset M$$

is called the orbit through x. An orbit which consists of a single point is called constant orbit. A non-constant orbit is called closed or periodic if there exists a $t\neq 0$ in $I(x)$ such that

$$\Phi(t, x) = x$$.

=== Real dynamical system ===
Given a real dynamical system (R, M, Φ), I(x) is an open interval in the real numbers, that is $I(x) = (t_x^- , t_x^+)$. For any x in M

$$\gamma_{x}^{+} := \{\Phi(t,x) : t \in (0,t_x^+)\}$$

is called positive semi-orbit through x and

$$\gamma_{x}^{-} := \{\Phi(t,x) : t \in (t_x^-,0)\}$$

is called negative semi-orbit through x.

=== Discrete time dynamical system ===
For a discrete time dynamical system with a time-invariant evolution function $f$:

The forward orbit of x is the set :

$$\gamma_{x}^{+} \  \overset{\underset{\mathrm{def}}{}}{=}   \     \{ f^{t}(x) : t \ge 0 \}$$

If the function is invertible, the backward orbit of x is the set :

$$\gamma_{x}^{-} \ \overset{\underset{\mathrm{def}}{}}{=}   \     \{f^{t}(x)  : t \le 0 \}$$

and orbit of x is the set :

$$\gamma_{x}  \  \overset{\underset{\mathrm{def}}{}}{=}  \  \gamma_{x}^{-} \cup \gamma_{x}^{+}$$

where :

- $f$ is the evolution function $f : X \to X$
- set $X$ is the dynamical space,
- $t$ is number of iteration, which is natural number and $t \in T$
- $x$ is initial state of system and $x \in X$

=== General dynamical system ===
For a general dynamical system, especially in homogeneous dynamics, when one has a "nice" group $G$ acting on a probability space $X$ in a measure-preserving way, an orbit $G.x \subset X$ will be called periodic (or equivalently, closed) if the stabilizer $Stab_{G}(x)$ is a lattice inside $G$.

In addition, a related term is a bounded orbit, when the set $G.x$ is pre-compact inside $X$.

The classification of orbits can lead to interesting questions with relations to other mathematical areas, for example the Oppenheim conjecture (proved by Margulis) and the Littlewood conjecture (partially proved by Lindenstrauss) are dealing with the question whether every bounded orbit of some natural action on the homogeneous space $SL_{3}(\mathbb{R})\backslash SL_{3}(\mathbb{Z})$ is indeed periodic one, this observation is due to Raghunathan and in different language due to Cassels and Swinnerton-Dyer . Such questions are intimately related to deep measure-classification theorems.

=== Notes ===
It is often the case that the evolution function can be understood to compose the elements of a group, in which case the group-theoretic orbits of the group action are the same thing as the dynamical orbits.

== Examples ==
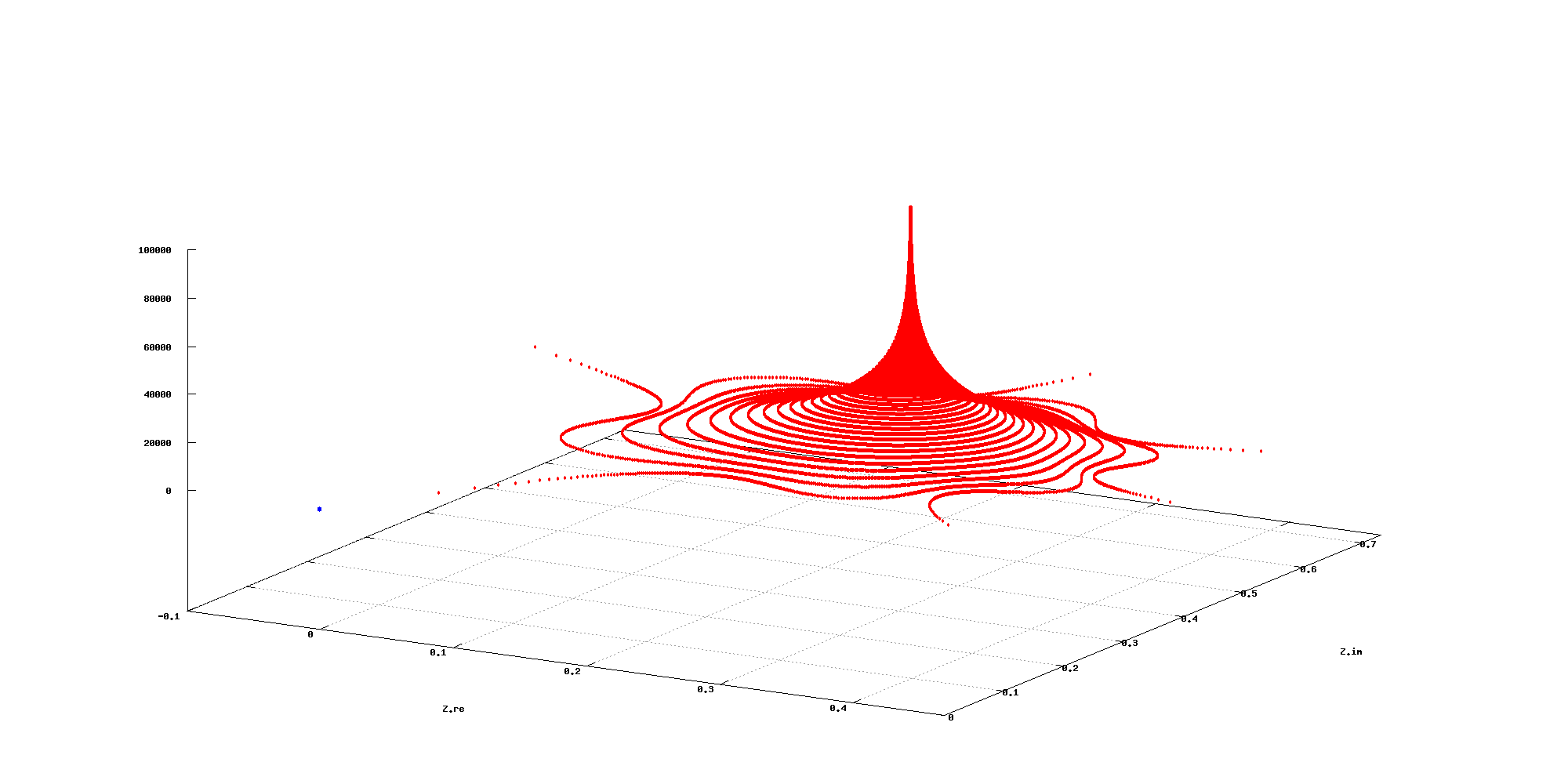
Critical orbit of discrete dynamical system based on complex quadratic polynomial. It tends to weakly attracting fixed point with multiplier=0.99993612384259

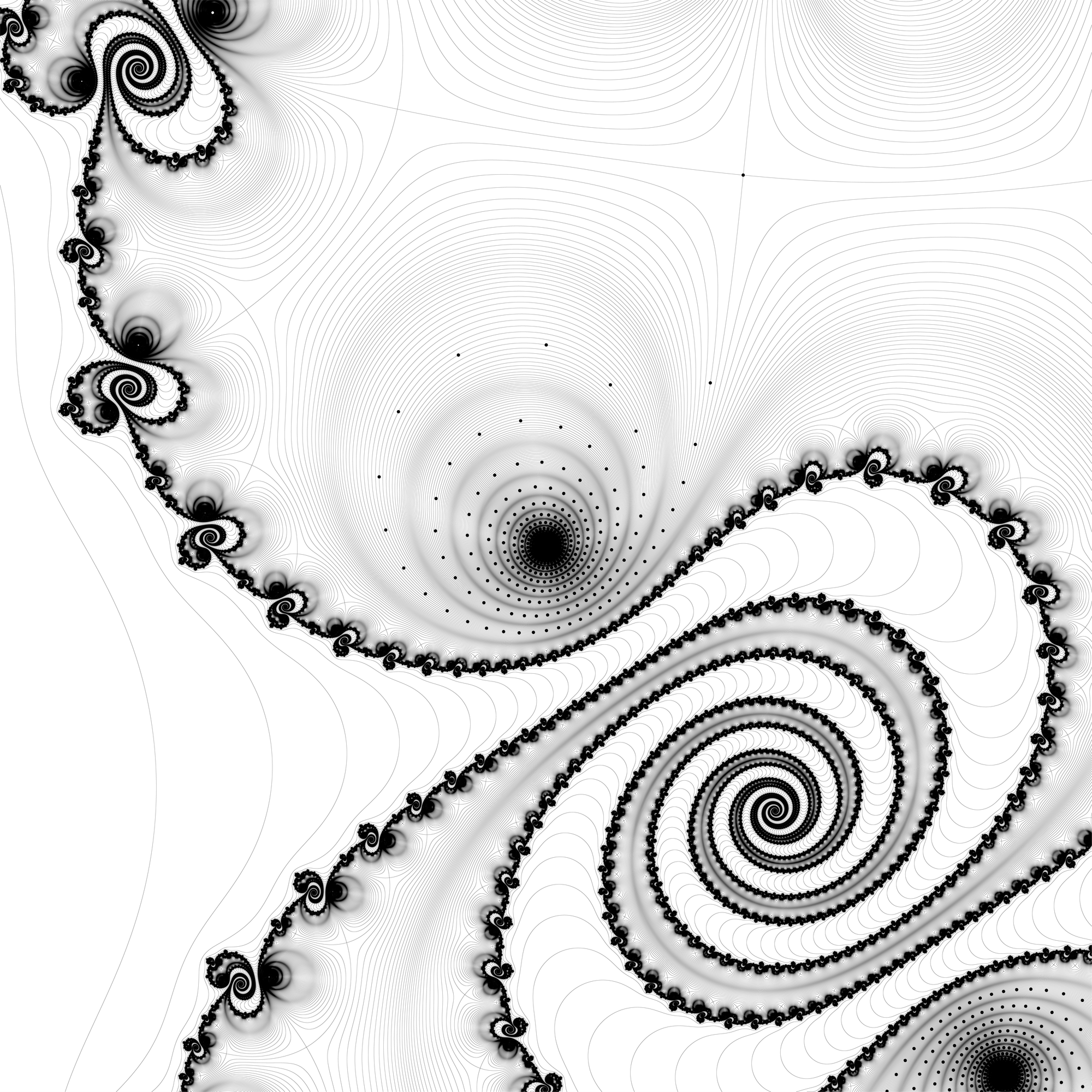
Critical orbit tends to weakly attracting point. One can see spiral from attracting fixed point to repelling fixed point ( z= 0) which is a place with high density of level curves.
- The orbit of an equilibrium point is a constant orbit.

== Stability of orbits ==
A basic classification of orbits is

- constant orbits or fixed points
- periodic orbits
- non-constant and non-periodic orbits

An orbit can fail to be closed in two ways. It could be an asymptotically periodic orbit if it converges to a periodic orbit. Such orbits are not closed because they never truly repeat, but they become arbitrarily close to a repeating orbit. An orbit can also be chaotic. These orbits come arbitrarily close to the initial point, but fail to ever converge to a periodic orbit. They exhibit sensitive dependence on initial conditions, meaning that small differences in the initial value will cause large differences in future points of the orbit.

There are other properties of orbits that allow for different classifications. An orbit can be hyperbolic if nearby points approach or diverge from the orbit exponentially fast.

== See also ==
- Wandering set
- Phase space method
- Phase space
- Cobweb plot or Verhulst diagram
- Periodic points of complex quadratic mappings and multiplier of orbit
- Orbit portrait
