= Quadratic transformation =

In mathematics, a quadratic transformation may be

- A quadratic transformation in the Cremona group
- Kummer's quadratic transformation of the hypergeometric function
