= Quadrant (motorcycles) =

British motorcycle manufacturer, 1901–1928

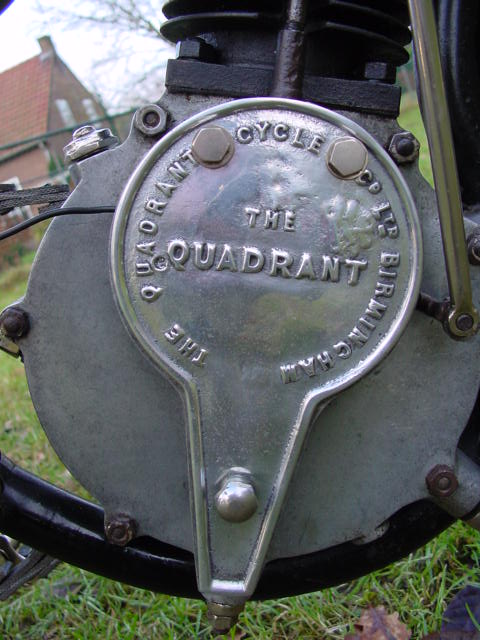
- Quadrant 1903
- Company type: Private
- Industry: Motorcycle
- Founded: 1901
- Founder: Walter and William Lloyd
- Defunct: 1928
- Fate: Wound up
- Headquarters: Birmingham, England
- Key people: Walter and William Lloyd

Quadrant was one of the earliest British motorcycle manufacturers, established in Birmingham in 1901. Famous for their big singles, Quadrant pioneered many innovations that proved important for motorcycle development but struggled after the First World War and the company was wound up in 1928.

== History ==
Founded by Walter and William Lloyd in 1883 as a company to make bicycles and tricycles, Quadrant developed some of the first motorcycles in 1901. The first Quadrant motorcycle was fitted with the then very popular Minerva "clip-on" engine. They also made powered tricycles in 1902. Walter took out a patent in 1902 for an 'all-in-one' control lever to raise the exhaust valve, control the ignition switch and operate the throttle and the ignition advance.

By 1902 the Quadrant Cycle Co was making their own engines, their advert claiming "The engine and carburettor throughout, as also the bicycle, are made in our own Works". These were ahead of their time as the engines were not just fixed on to a bicycle frame. Instead, the frame was purpose-built to properly hold the engine, and the Quadrant motorcycles also pioneered a suction inlet valve, hand oil pump and direct drive, contact breaker ignition replacing trembler ignition in 1902, as well as a spray carburetor in 1904 and magneto ignition in 1907. A famous long-distance motorcycle rider called Tom Silver was contracted by the company and gained them a lot of publicity through his success on Quadrant motorcycles in long-distance events and in 1907 he became the managing director. The arrangement was not a success, however, and the company collapsed from internal disputes in 1907, with Silver leaving to form Silver Motors.

A new company, Quadrant Motor Co Ltd, was formed in 1907 after Walter Lloyd bought Quadrant. In September 1907 they announced their new Quadrant motorcycle with a 3.5 hp single-cylinder engine with automatic inlet valve. The bore and stroke were 81mm by 88mm, the same as the 1906-1907 Quadrants, but with detailed changes. Tom Silver returned in 1909 but once again Silver was not able to get on with the new owner and left to build motorcycles under his own name. In 1911 Quadrant produced several models, including a 1129 cc V-twin and a 600 cc single.

Production was halted during the First World War as the factory switched to the manufacture of aeroplane engine parts. In an article in 1916 they outlined that they planned for their post-war models to benefit from the aeroplane engine experience with lighter cylinders and alloy pistons. Although engaged in war work they did some development on future models, and in 1916 showed a 3.5 hp "After the War" model (smaller than their normal machines with 85mm bore and 88mm stroke). This was fitted with a patented paraffin vaporiser to allow it to run on paraffin after starting on petrol (petrol being in short supply).

After the war the 1916 small capacity model did not appear, but instead they produced a range of 654 cc and 780 cc single-cylinder motorcycles, for which they became well known. However at the Olympia Motor Cycle show of 1919 they showed a 292 cc two-stroke scooter with a step-through frame and the compact engine assembly sited under the seat. This did not feature in subsequent adverts, so was presumably a prototype. In 1921 a 565cc model was available following the same general design as its predecessors. It had a three-speed Sturmey-Archer countershaft gearbox with kick-start, rear chain (as opposed to belt), Druid forks, and Amac or Senspray carburettor.

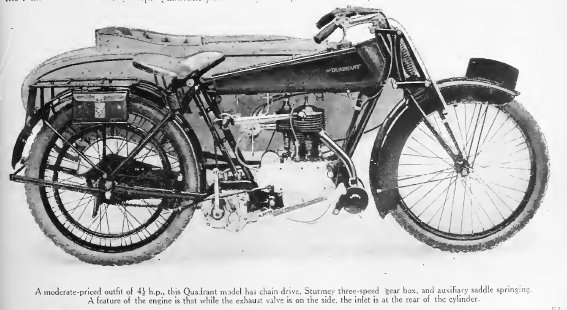
1921 565cc Quadrant Combination

There were further company changes and by December 1921 adverts for the Quadrant motorcycle listed the company name as March, Newark and Co Ltd, Quadrant Works, Birmingham. In 1922 Quadrant's London agent Clifford Wilson entered the International Six Days trial on his 654cc Quadrant, he got a gold medal, and best in class. Introduced in 1922 was a side valve 490cc single (bore 70mm, stroke 100mm), earlier models having a side exhaust, and rear inlet valve. In 1924 two models were offered, the 490 cc side-valve and a hefty 624 cc side-valve with bore and stroke of 85x110. The Quadrant range included outdated side-valve motorcycles, updated in 1927 with the launch of a 490 cc overhead-valve model, but it did not sell well and the company was wound up in 1928.

== See also ==
- Quadrant Cycle Company
