= Quadrant Cycle Company =

The Quadrant Cycle Company was a company in Birmingham, England that was established in 1890 as a bicycle manufacturer. They advanced to make motorcycles from 1899 until their demise in 1928. They also produced a tricar called "Carette" in 1899, and a small number of cars for about two years around 1906.

The company exhibited a car chassis with a four-speed Lloyd gearbox of the style known as "crossed rollers"; this allowed direct drive at all speeds. They used 14/16 or 20/22 hp engines made by White and Poppe.

== See also ==
- Quadrant (motorcycles)
