= Complex quadratic polynomial =

Quadratic polynomial

A complex quadratic polynomial is a quadratic polynomial whose coefficients and variable are complex numbers.

== Properties ==
Quadratic polynomials have the following properties, regardless of the form:

- It is a unicritical polynomial, i.e. it has one finite critical point in the complex plane, Dynamical plane consist of maximally 2 basins: the basin of infinity and basin of the finite critical point (if the finite critical point does not escape)
- It can be postcritically finite, i.e. the orbit of the critical point can be finite, because the critical point is periodic or preperiodic.
- It is a unimodal function,
- It is a rational function,
- It is an entire function.

== Forms ==
When the quadratic polynomial has only one variable (univariate), one can distinguish its four main forms:

- The general form: $f(x) = a_2 x^2 + a_1 x + a_0$ where $a_2 \ne 0$
- The factored form used for the logistic map: $f_r(x) = r x (1-x)$
- $f_{\theta}(x) = x^2 +\lambda x$ which has an indifferent fixed point with multiplier $\lambda = e^{2 \pi \theta i}$ at the origin
- The monic and centered form, $f_c(x) = x^2 +c$

The monic and centered form has been studied extensively, and has the following properties:

- It is the simplest form of a nonlinear function with one coefficient (parameter),
- It is a centered polynomial (the sum of its critical points is zero).
- It is a binomial

The lambda form $f_{\lambda}(z) = z^2 +\lambda z$ is:

- The simplest non-trivial perturbation of unperturbated system $z \mapsto \lambda z$
- "The first family of dynamical systems in which explicit necessary and sufficient conditions are known for when a small divisor problem is stable"

== Conjugation ==
=== Between forms ===
Since $f_c(x)$ is affine conjugate to the general form of the quadratic polynomial it is often used to study complex dynamics and to create images of Mandelbrot, Julia and Fatou sets.

When one wants change from $\theta$ to $c$:

$$c = c(\theta) = \frac {e^{2 \pi \theta i}}{2} \left(1 - \frac {e^{2 \pi \theta i}}{2}\right).$$

When one wants change from $r$ to $c$, the parameter transformation is

$$c = c(r) = \frac{1- (r-1)^2}{4} = -\frac{r}{2} \left(\frac{r-2}{2}\right)$$

and the transformation between the variables in $z_{t+1}=z_t^2+c$ and $x_{t+1}=rx_t(1-x_t)$ is

$$z=r\left(\frac{1}{2}-x\right).$$

=== With doubling map ===
There is semi-conjugacy between the dyadic transformation (the doubling map) and the quadratic polynomial case of c = –2.

== Notation ==
=== Iteration ===
Here $f^n$ denotes the n-th iterate of the function $f$:

$$f_c^n(z) = f_c^1(f_c^{n-1}(z))$$

so

$$z_n = f_c^n(z_0).$$

Because of the possible confusion with exponentiation, some authors write $f^{\circ n}$ for the nth iterate of $f$.

=== Parameter ===
The monic and centered form $f_c(x) = x^2 +c$ can be marked by:

- The parameter $c$
- The external angle $\theta$ of the ray that lands:
  - At c in Mandelbrot set on the parameter plane
  - On the critical value:z = c in Julia set on the dynamic plane

so :

$$f_c = f_{\theta}$$

$$c = c({\theta})$$

Examples:

- c is the landing point of the 1/6 external ray of the Mandelbrot set, and is $z \to z^2+i$ (where i^2=-1)
- c is the landing point the 5/14 external ray and is $z \to z^2+ c$ with $c = -1.23922555538957 + 0.412602181602004*i$
1/4

1/6

9/56

129/16256

=== Map ===
The monic and centered form, sometimes called the Douady-Hubbard family of quadratic polynomials, is typically used with variable $z$ and parameter $c$:

$$f_c(z) = z^2 +c.$$

When it is used as an evolution function of the discrete nonlinear dynamical system,

$$z_{n+1} = f_c(z_n)$$

it is named the quadratic map:

$$f_c : z \to z^2 + c.$$

The Mandelbrot set is the set of values of the parameter c for which the initial condition z_{0} = 0 does not cause the iterates to diverge to infinity.

== Critical items ==
=== Critical points ===
==== Complex Plane ====
A critical point of $f_c$ is a point $z_{cr}$ on the dynamical plane such that the derivative vanishes:

$$f_c'(z_{cr}) = 0.$$

Since

$$f_c'(z) = \frac{d}{dz}f_c(z) = 2z$$

implies that

$$z_{cr} = 0,$$

we see that the only (finite) critical point of $f_c$ is the point $z_{cr} = 0$.

$z_0$ is an initial point for Mandelbrot set iteration.

For the quadratic family $f_c(z)=z^2+c$ the critical point z = 0 is the center of symmetry of the Julia set Jc, so it is a convex combination of two points in Jc.

==== Extended complex plane ====
In the Riemann sphere, a complex quadratic polynomial has 2d-2 critical points. In this model, zero and infinity are critical points.

=== Critical value ===
A critical value $z_{cv}$ of $f_c$ is the image of a critical point:

$$z_{cv} = f_c(z_{cr})$$

Since

$$z_{cr} = 0$$

we have

$$z_{cv} = c$$

So the parameter $c$ is the critical value of $f_c(z)$.

=== Critical level curves ===
A critical level curve the level curve which contain critical point. It acts as a sort of skeleton of dynamical plane

Example: level curves cross at saddle point, which is a special type of critical point.

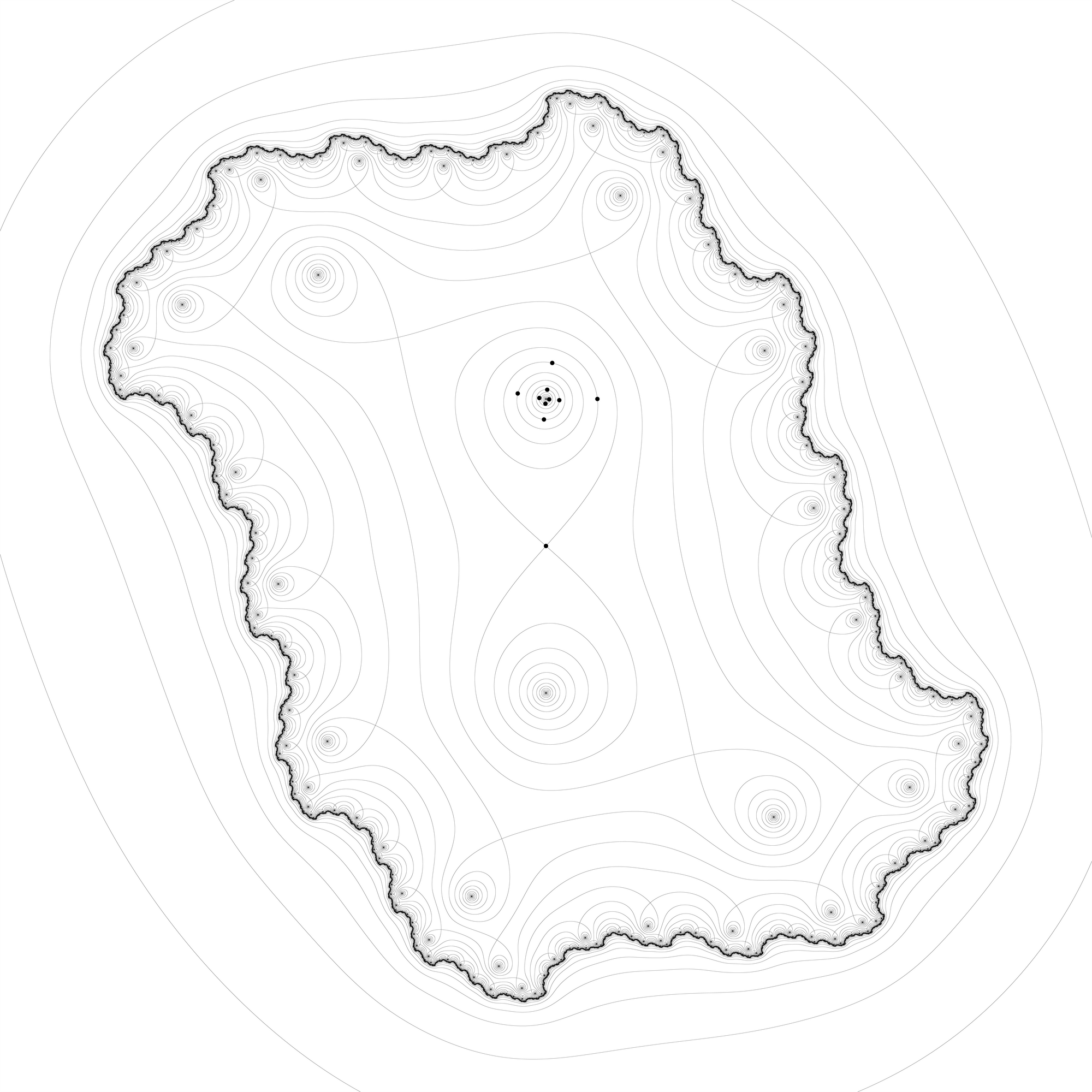
attracting

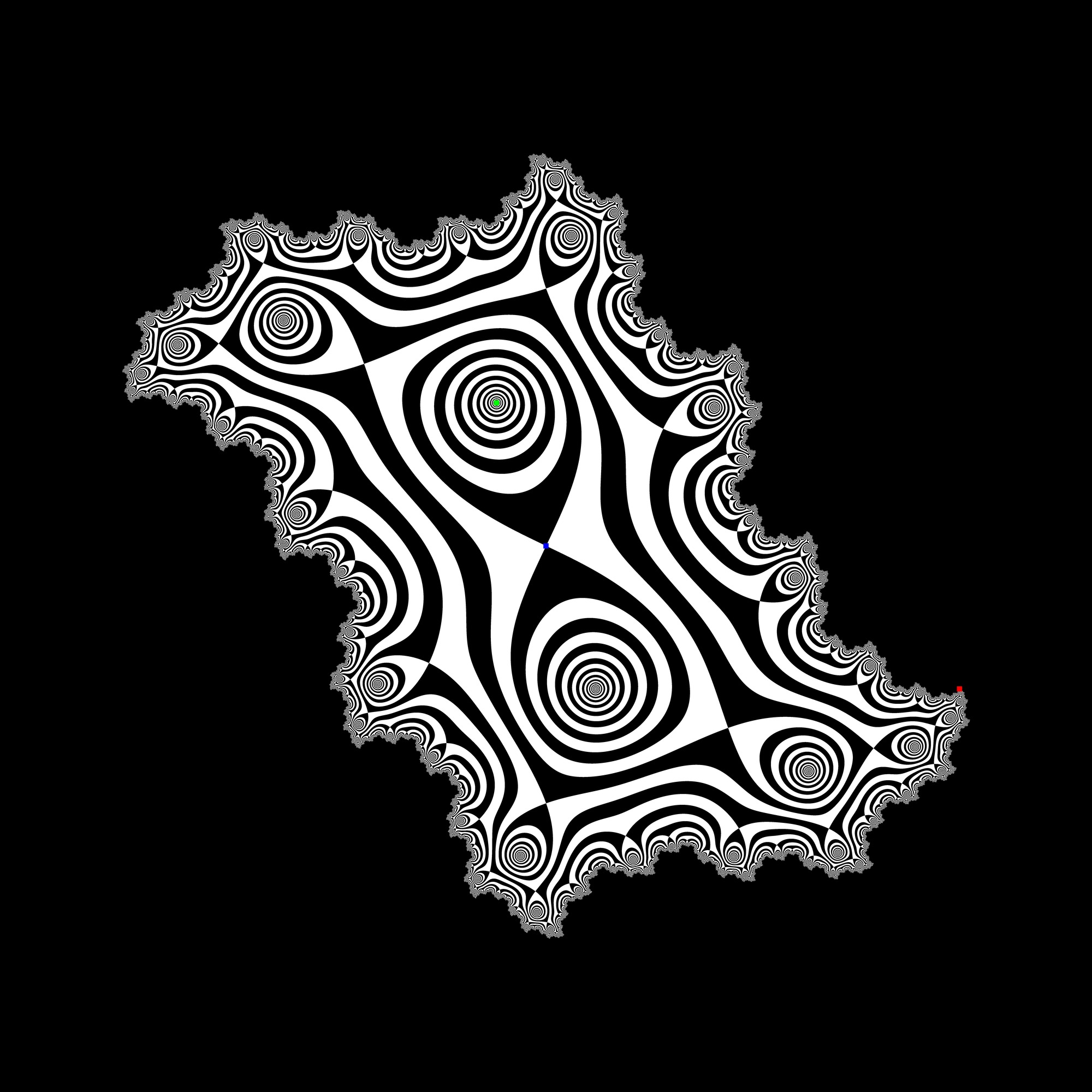
attracting

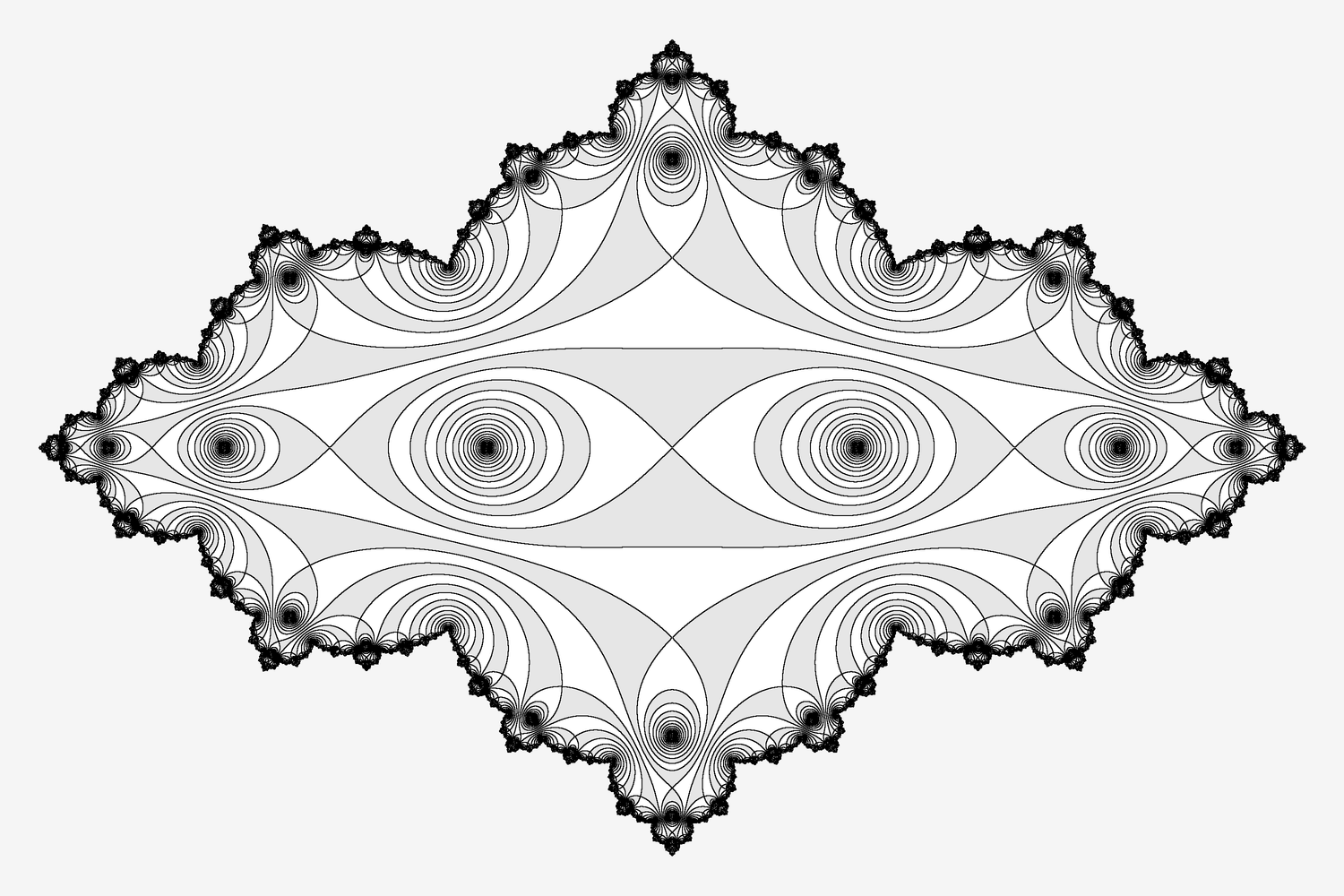
attracting

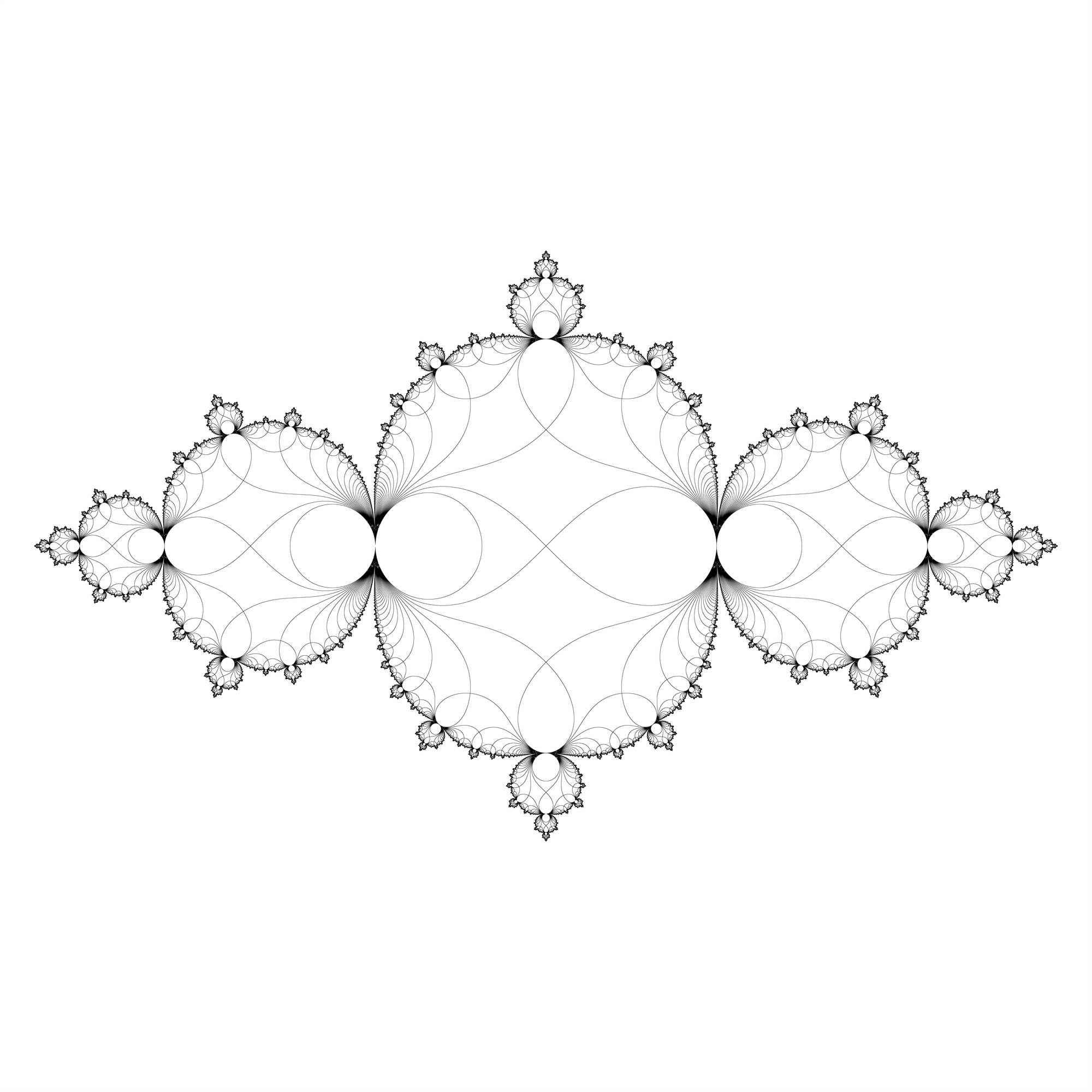
parabolic

Video for c along internal ray 0

=== Critical limit set ===
Critical limit set is the set of forward orbit of all critical points

=== Critical orbit ===
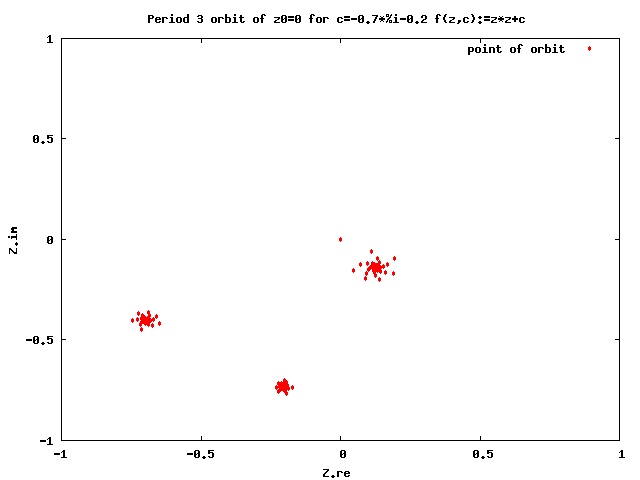
Dynamical plane with critical orbit falling into 3-period cycle

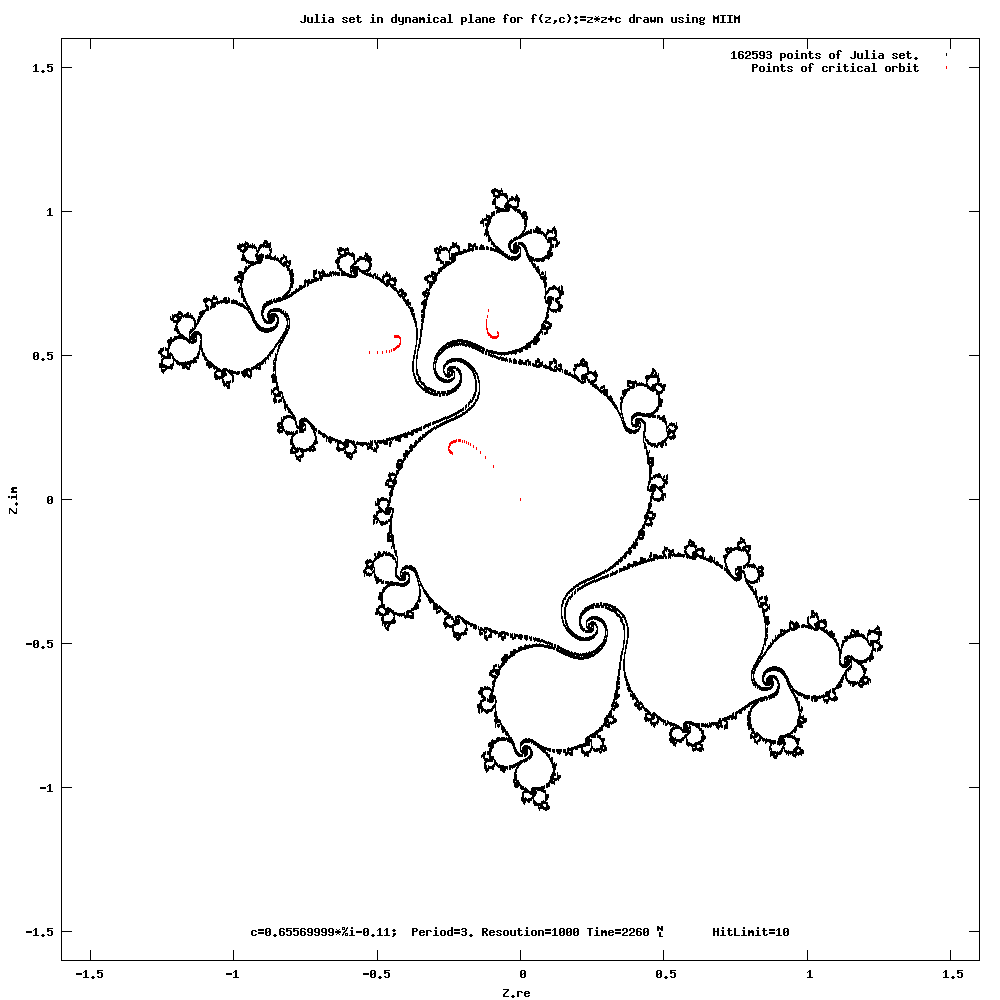
Dynamical plane with Julia set and critical orbit.

Dynamical plane : changes of critical orbit along internal ray of main cardioid for angle 1/6

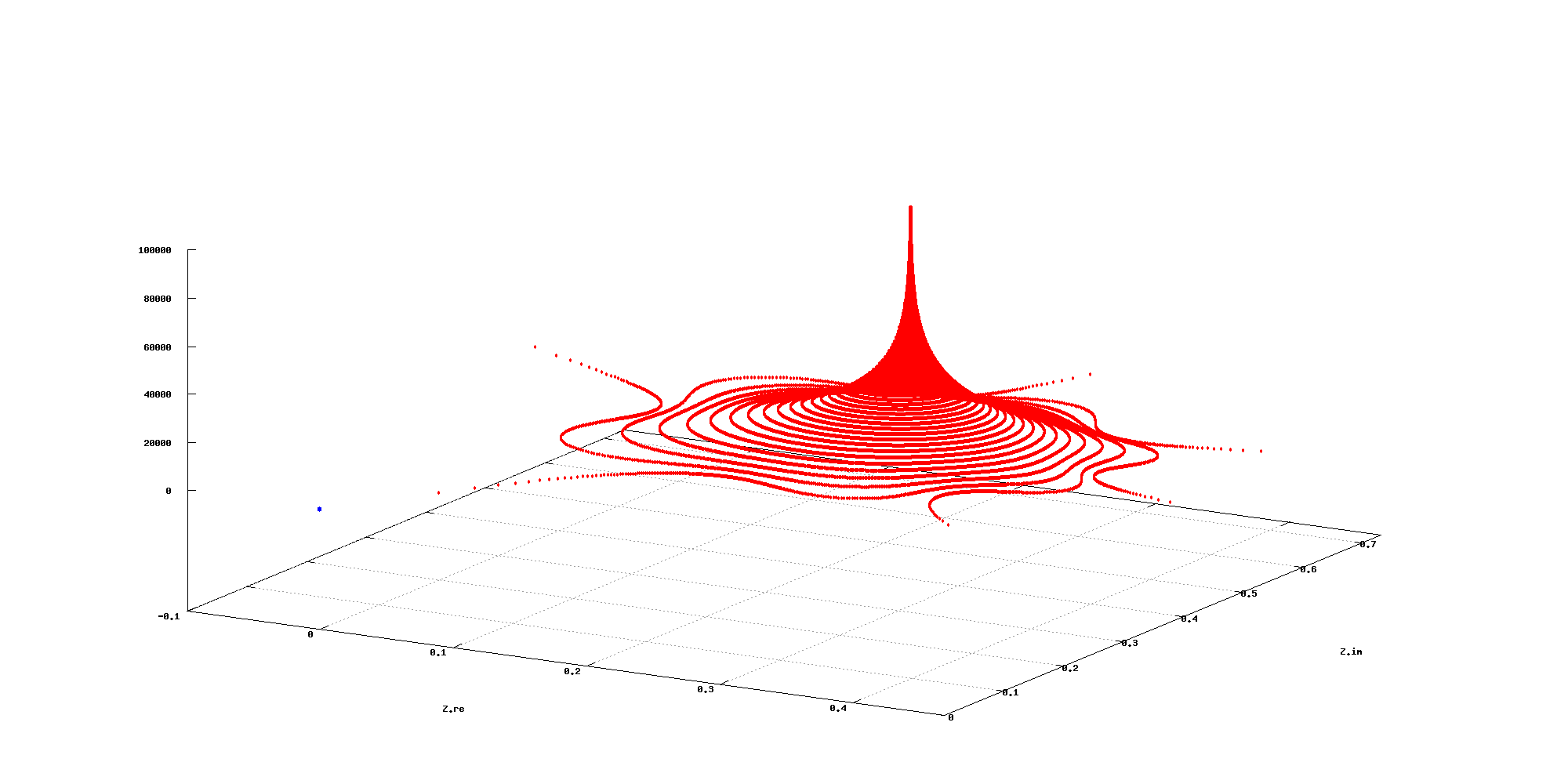
Critical orbit tending to weakly attracting fixed point with abs(multiplier) = 0.99993612384259

The forward orbit of a critical point is called a critical orbit. Critical orbits are very important because every attracting periodic orbit attracts a critical point, so studying the critical orbits helps us understand the dynamics in the Fatou set.

$$z_0 = z_{cr} = 0$$

$$z_1 = f_c(z_0) = c$$

$$z_2 = f_c(z_1) = c^2 +c$$

$$z_3 = f_c(z_2) = (c^2 + c)^2 + c$$

$$\ \vdots$$

This orbit falls into an attracting periodic cycle if one exists.

=== Critical sector ===
The critical sector is a sector of the dynamical plane containing the critical point.

=== Critical set ===
Critical set is a set of critical points

=== Critical polynomial ===
$$P_n(c) = f_c^n(z_{cr}) = f_c^n(0)$$

so

$$P_0(c)= 0$$

$$P_1(c) = c$$

$$P_2(c) = c^2 + c$$

$$P_3(c) = (c^2 + c)^2 + c$$

These polynomials are used for:

- finding centers of these Mandelbrot set components of period n. Centers are roots of n-th critical polynomials

$$\text{centers} = \{ c : P_n(c) = 0 \}$$

- finding roots of Mandelbrot set components of period n (local minimum of $P_n(c)$)
- Misiurewicz points

$$M_{n,k} = \{ c : P_k(c) = P_{k+n}(c) \}$$

=== Critical curves ===
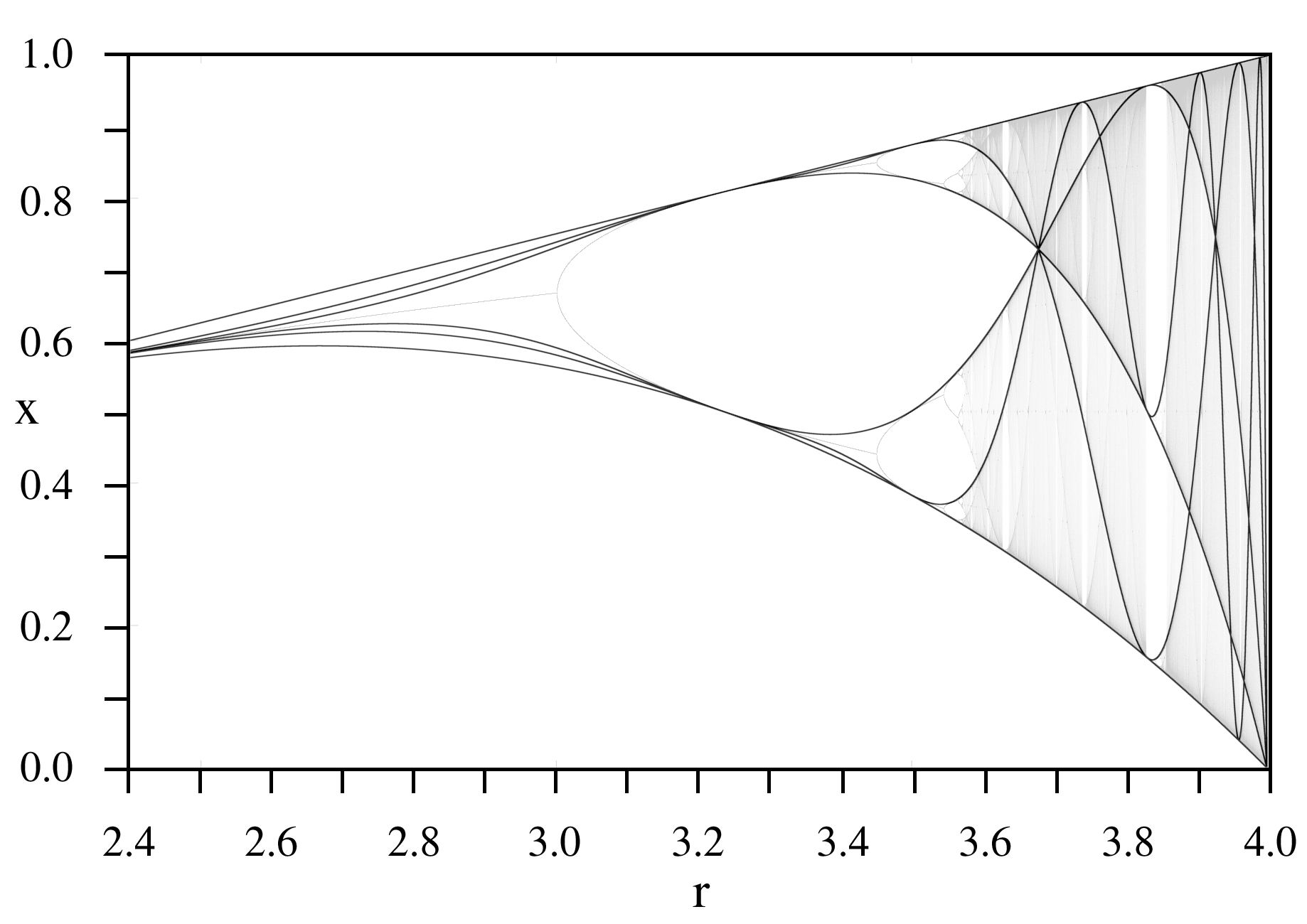
Critical curves

Diagrams of critical polynomials are called critical curves.

These curves create the skeleton (the dark lines) of a bifurcation diagram.

== Spaces, planes ==
=== 4D space ===
One can use the Julia-Mandelbrot 4-dimensional (4D) space for a global analysis of this dynamical system.

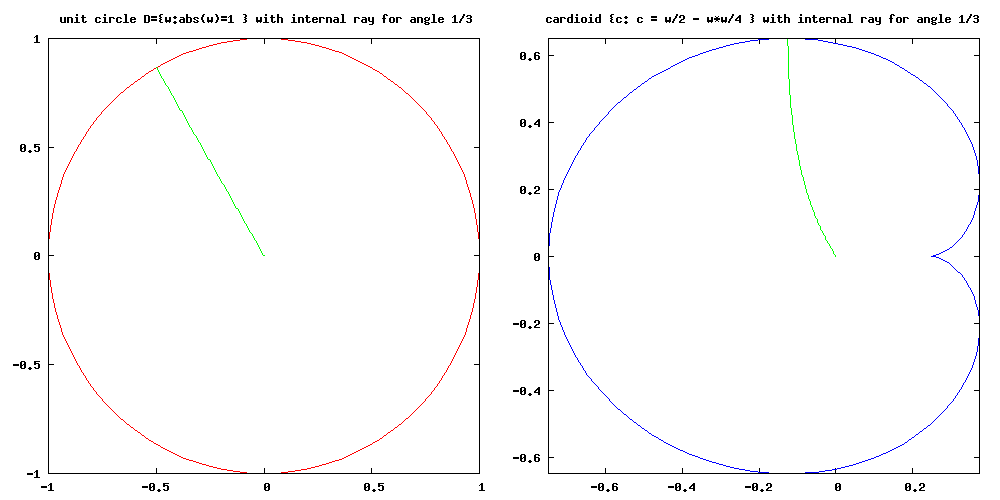
w-plane and c-plane

In this space there are two basic types of 2D planes:

- the dynamical (dynamic) plane, $f_c$-plane or c-plane
- the parameter plane or z-plane

There is also another plane used to analyze such dynamical systems w-plane:

- the conjugation plane
- model plane

==== 2D Parameter plane ====
Parameter plane types

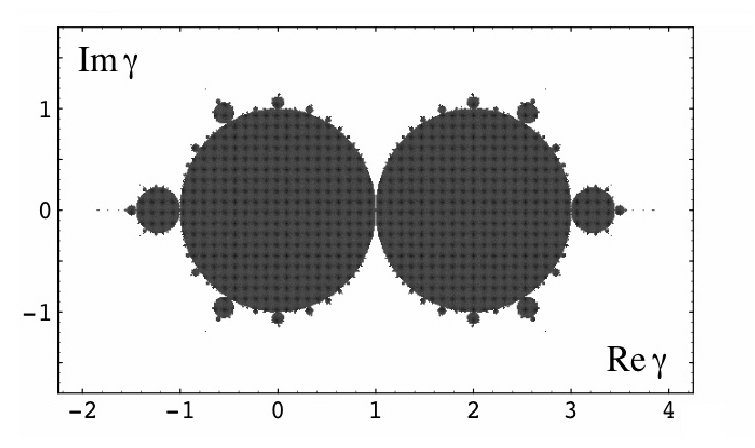
r parameter plane (logistic map)

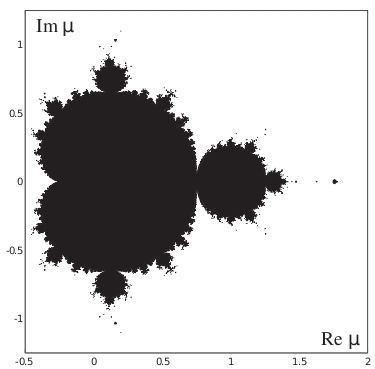
c parameter plane

The phase space of a quadratic map is called its parameter plane. Here:

$z_0 = z_{cr}$ is constant and $c$ is variable.

There are neither dynamics nor orbits on the parameter plane. However, there is a set of parameter values.

The parameter plane consists of:

- The Mandelbrot set
  - The bifurcation locus = boundary of Mandelbrot set with root points
  - Bounded hyperbolic components of the Mandelbrot set = interior of Mandelbrot set with internal rays
- Exterior of Mandelbrot set with
  - External rays
  - Equipotential lines

Besides the aforementioned set, there are many different sub-types of the parameter plane.

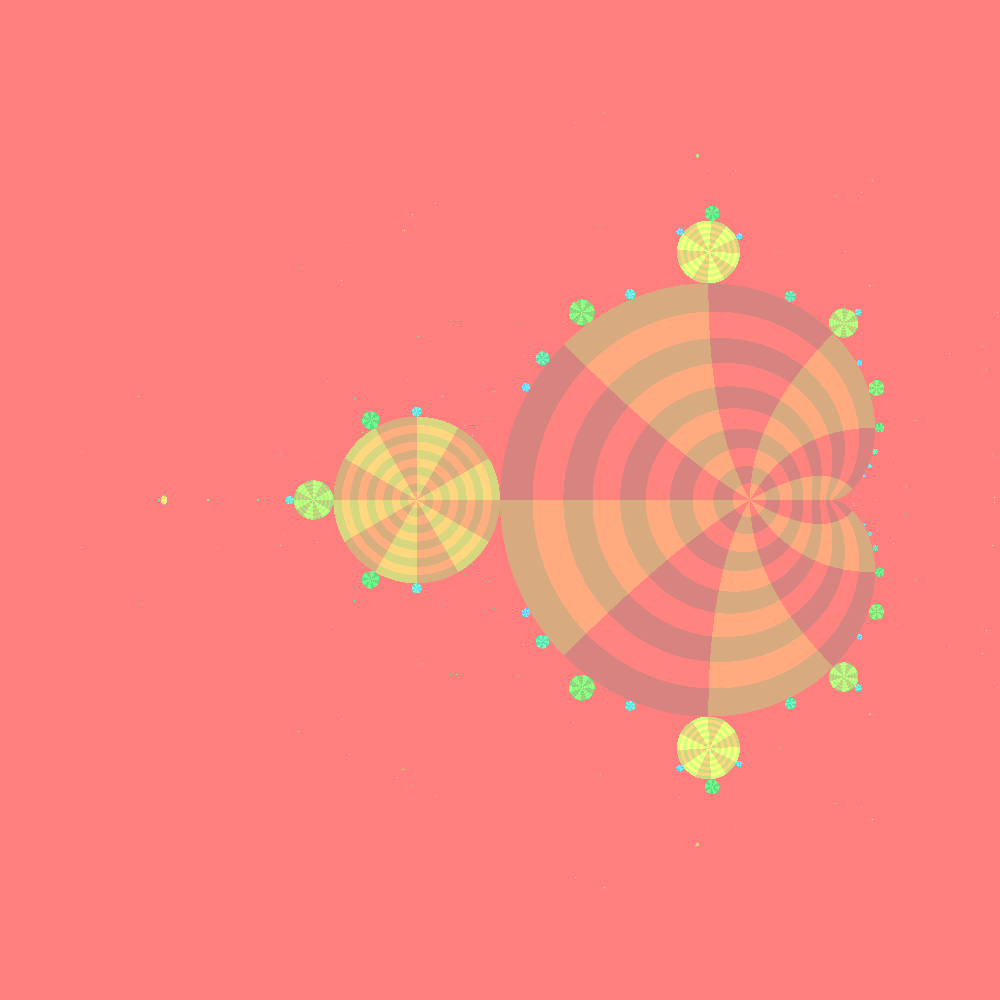
Multiplier map

See also :

- Boettcher map which maps exterior of Mandelbrot set to the exterior of unit disc
- multiplier map which maps interior of hyperbolic component of Mandelbrot set to the interior of unit disc

==== 2D Dynamical plane ====
"The polynomial Pc maps each dynamical ray to another ray doubling the angle (which we measure in full turns, i.e. 0 = 1 = 2π rad = 360°), and the dynamical rays of any polynomial "look like straight rays" near infinity. This allows us to study the Mandelbrot and Julia sets combinatorially, replacing the dynamical plane by the unit circle, rays by angles, and the quadratic polynomial by the doubling modulo one map." Virpi Kauko

On the dynamical plane one can find:

- The Julia set
- The Filled Julia set
- The Fatou set
- Orbits

The dynamical plane consists of:

- Fatou set
- Julia set

Here, $c$ is a constant and $z$ is a variable.

The two-dimensional dynamical plane can be treated as a Poincaré cross-section of three-dimensional space of continuous dynamical system.

Dynamical z-planes can be divided into two groups:

- $f_0$ plane for $c = 0$ (see complex squaring map)
- $f_c$ planes (all other planes for $c \ne 0$)

=== Riemann sphere ===
The extended complex plane plus a point at infinity

- the Riemann sphere

== Derivatives ==
=== First derivative with respect to c ===
On the parameter plane:

- $c$ is a variable
- $z_0 = 0$ is constant

The first derivative of $f_c^n(z_0)$ with respect to c is

$$z_n' = \frac{d}{dc} f_c^n(z_0).$$

This derivative can be found by iteration starting with

$$z_0' = \frac{d}{dc} f_c^0(z_0) = 1$$

and then replacing at every consecutive step

$$z_{n+1}' = \frac{d}{dc} f_c^{n+1}(z_0) = 2\cdot{}f_c^n(z)\cdot\frac{d}{dc} f_c^n(z_0) + 1 = 2 \cdot z_n \cdot z_n' +1.$$

This can easily be verified by using the chain rule for the derivative.

This derivative is used in the distance estimation method for drawing a Mandelbrot set.

=== First derivative with respect to z ===
On the dynamical plane:

- $z$ is a variable;
- $c$ is a constant.

At a fixed point $z_0$,

$$f_c'(z_0) = \frac{d}{dz}f_c(z_0) = 2z_0 .$$

At a periodic point z_{0} of period p the first derivative of a function

$$(f_c^p)'(z_0) = \frac{d}{dz}f_c^p(z_0) =  \prod_{i=0}^{p-1} f_c'(z_i) = 2^p \prod_{i=0}^{p-1} z_i = \lambda$$

is often represented by $\lambda$ and referred to as the multiplier or the Lyapunov characteristic number. Its logarithm is known as the Lyapunov exponent. Absolute value of multiplier is used to check the stability of periodic (also fixed) points.

At a nonperiodic point, the derivative, denoted by $z'_n$, can be found by iteration starting with

$$z'_0 = 1,$$

and then using

$$z'_n= 2*z_{n-1}*z'_{n-1}.$$

This derivative is used for computing the external distance to the Julia set.

=== Schwarzian derivative ===
The Schwarzian derivative (SD for short) of f is:

$$(Sf)(z) = \frac{f'''(z)}{f'(z)} - \frac{3}{2} \left ( \frac{f''(z)}{f'(z)}\right ) ^2 .$$

== See also ==
- Misiurewicz point
- Periodic points of complex quadratic mappings
- Mandelbrot set
- Julia set
- Milnor–Thurston kneading theory
- Tent map
- Logistic map
