= Triumph Quadrant =

British motorcycle

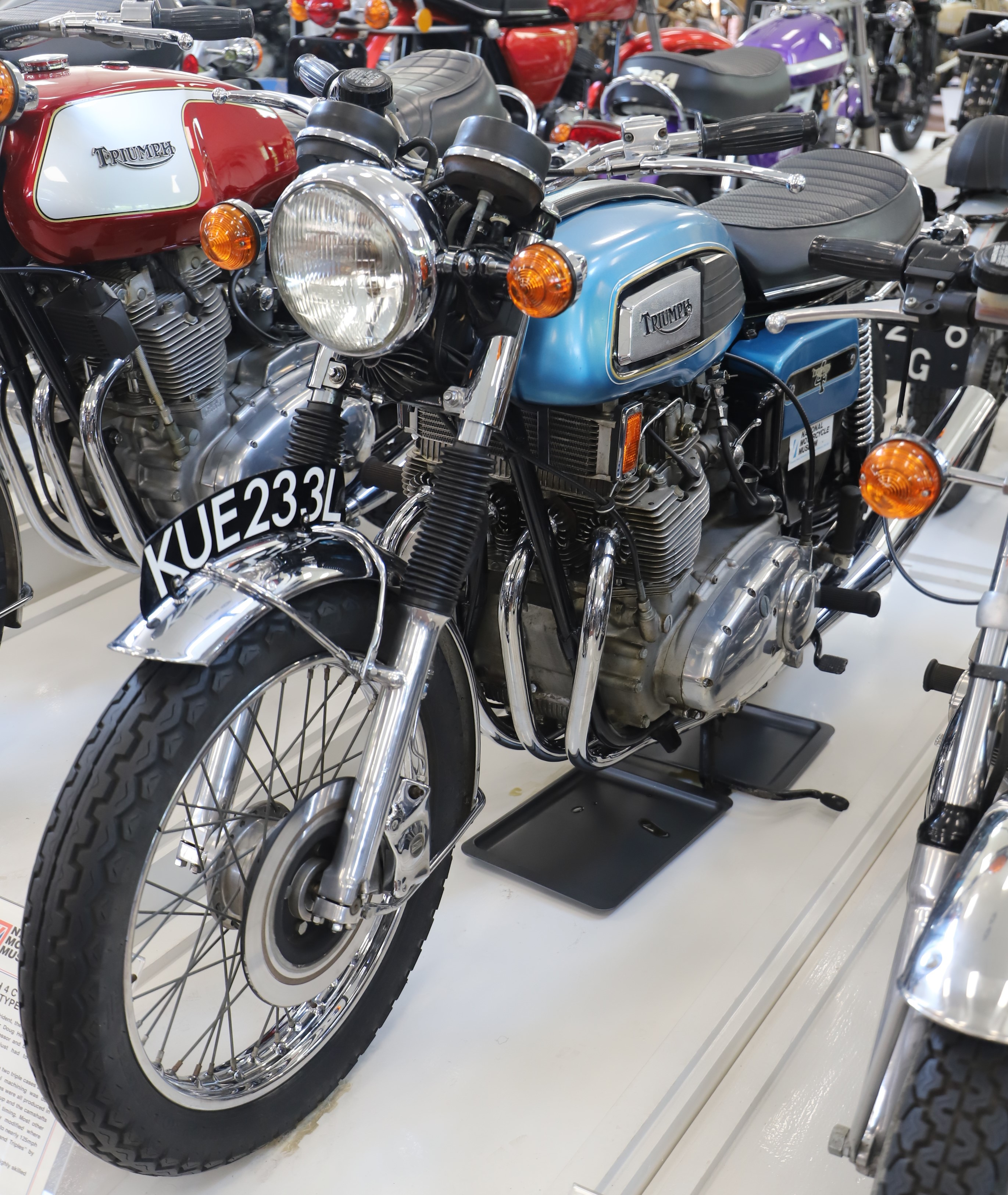
- Manufacturer: Triumph Engineering
- Class: Standard
- Engine: 1,000 cc air-cooled, ohv inline-four

The so-called Triumph Quadrant (a.k.a. "Quadrent") was a "bitsa" designed and built in secret by Doug Hele in 1973. It was a 1,000 cc four-cylinder motorcycle made up from Trident parts (although the camshaft was sourced from outside the factory). Essentially, the fourth cylinder came from grafting on an extra middle crankcase unit; but since the primary chaincase and final drive sprocket could not be relocated, the fourth cylinder protruded on the right hand side of the bike. The top speed was reputedly 125 mph.

Quite why Hele developed this motorcycle is something of a mystery, as the lopsided machine could never have reached production to compete with modern Japanese machines such as the Honda CB750 or the Kawasaki Z1. An inside view is that Hele's efforts in building the Quadrant was a waste of precious resources that (given NVT's precarious status) should have been directed elsewhere, such as getting the 900 cc triple "Thunderbird III" to market sooner.

The National Motorcycle Museum in the UK and Roy Bacon, the author of "Triumph Twins and Triples", hold a different opinion of the Triumph Quadrant prototype than the above posting:

== Triump 4-cylinder 1000cc Prototype ==
The Experimental Department under Doug Hele and based at Kitts Green, looked ahead for a successor to the Trident and built a four cylinder prototype nicknamed "The Quadrant".

The crankcase was made by machining two triple cases and then welding them together before the final machining was done. The cylinder block, the head and camboxes were all produced in the same way, but the crankshaft was built up and the camshafts specially made and carried cams with mild timing. Most other parts were from the triple or twin suitably modified where necessary. It pulled a top gear of 4.2 to 1 and ran to nearly 125mph with the mild cams. Only one example was ever made.
