= Moskowitz =

Moskowitz (also Moskovitz, Moskovits, Moscovitch, Moskovich, Moszkowicz, and other variants) is an Eastern Ashkenazic Jewish surname. A Germanized form of a Slavic patronymic of the Yiddish personal name Moshke, a pet form of Moshe. Moscovici is the Romanian form.

== People ==
=== Moscovich, Moscovitch ===
- Dylan Moscovitch (born 1984), Canadian pair skater
- Hannah Moscovitch (born 1978), Canadian female playwright
- Ivan Moscovich (1926–2023), Yugoslav-Dutch designer of games, puzzles, toys, and educational aids
- Maurice Moscovich (1871–1940), Russian-American actor
- Morris Moscovitch, psychologist

=== Moscowitz, Moskovitz ===
- Dustin Moskovitz, American businessman
- Jennie Moscowitz (1867/1868–1953), American actress

=== Moshkovich, Moshkovitz, Moschcowitz, Moschkowitz, Moshkowitz ===
- Dana Moshkovitz, Israeli computer scientist
- Eli Moschcowitz (1879–1964), Hungarian-born American doctor, Moschkowitz Syndrome
- Shulem Moshkovitz (1877–1958), Romania-born rabbi, known as the Shotzer Rebbe

=== Moskowitz ===
- Abraham Moskowitz Yiddish-language singer
- Avigdor Moskowitz (born 1953), Israeli basketball player
- Barry Ted Moskowitz (born 1950), American judge
- Belle Moskowitz, American political advisor
- Clara Moskowitz, American science journalist
- Dara Moskowitz Grumdahl, née Moskowitz, American food and wine writer
- Eva Moskowitz, American educator and politician from New York
- Eve Merriam, née Moskovitz (1916–1992), American poet
- Gilberte Marin-Moskovitz (1937–2019), French politician
- Gordon Moskowitz, social psychologist
- Hannah Moskowitz (born 1991), American author
- Henry Moskowitz, civil rights leader
- Henry Moskowitz, American real estate investor from New York
- Howard Moskowitz, American market researcher and psychophysicist
- Irving Moskowitz, American businessman and philanthropist
- Isa Chandra Moskowitz, American-born cookbook author
- Jared E. Moskowitz (born 1980), American politician from Florida
- Joel Moskowitz, American public health researcher
- Joseph Moskowitz, Romanian-born American cimbalom player and restaurateur
- Laurence Moskowitz, communications executive
- Michael A. Moskowitz, American neuroscientist
- Miriam Moskowitz. American convicted of conspiracy to obstruct justice during the McCarthy era
- Naftali Asher Yeshayahu Moscowitz (Moskowitz), Melitzer Rebbe of Ashdod
- Ohad Moskowitz (born 1974), Jewish singer
- Paul Moskowitz, American researcher
- Robert Moskowitz, American painter
- Sam Moskowitz, writer, critic, and historian
- Stacy Moskowitz, shooting victim of David Berkowitz
- Stanley Moskowitz, American CIA official
- Tobias Jacob "Toby" Moskowitz (born 1971), American financial economist

=== Moszkowicz ===
- Bram Moszkowicz (born 1960), Dutch jurist and lawyer
- Daniel Moszkowicz, aka Dawid Chone (1905–1943), Polish merchant
- Imo Moszkowicz (1925–2011), German director, writer and actor
- Martin Moszkowicz (born 1958), German film producer
- Max Moszkowicz (1926–2022), Dutch lawyer
- Ruth Handler (née Moskowicz; 1916–2002), American businesswoman and Barbie doll inventor

== Fictional characters ==
- An American Tail, American franchise of animated films where the protagonist is a mouse named Fievel Mousekewitz (word play on Moskowitz)
- "Merry Christmas, Mrs. Moskowitz", the tenth episode in season 6 of American sitcom Frasier
- Minnie and Moskowitz, a film by John Cassavetes
- Princess Diaries series of books by Meg Cabot where Moscovitz siblings, Michael and Lilly, are the oldest friends of protagonist Mia Thermopolis and important characters of the story.
- Eli "Hawk" Moskowitz, character in TV series Cobra Kai
- Sid Moscowitz, character in the 1990 film Alice
- Kevin Moskowitz better known as The Deep, one of the main superheroes in the TV series The Boys

== See also ==
- Moskvitch (disambiguation)
- Moscovici (Romanian form)
