= Moskal (surname) =

Moskal is a surname of Polish and Russian origin. The word literally means "Muscovite" and in modern days may is used as a pejorative for "Russian" in some cultures.

Notable people with the surname include:

- Edward Moskal (1924–2005), president of the Polish American Congress
- Hennadiy Moskal (born 1950), Ukrainian politician
- Jiří Moskal (born 1948), Czech racing driver
- Kazimierz Moskal (disambiguation)
- Moti Moskal (1995–1953), Israeli military commander
- Robert Mikhail Moskal (1937–2022), American Ukrainian Greek Catholic bishop
- Tomasz Moskal (born 1975), Polish footballer
- Stanisław Moskal (1935–2019), Polish scientist and writer

== See also ==
- Moskalyov
- Moskalik
- Moskalenko
- Muscal (disambiguation)
