= Biomorph =

Biomorph may refer to:

- A shape resembling that of a living organism (such as bacteria), though not necessarily of biotic origin
- One of the virtual creatures in a computer simulation described by Richard Dawkins in his book The Blind Watchmaker
- In biomorphism, shapes that derive their form from nature as with contemporary architecture art
- One of the organic creatures in the art of surrealist painters such as Salvador Dalí or Yves Tanguy
- One of the mysterious alien creatures in the book Империя Превыше Всего (Empire Above All) by Nick Perumov
- Various fractals, particularly Pickover biomorphs, which are computer generated graphics from mathematical chaos modelisation
- Biomorph (video game), a video game released in 2024
