= Moskal (disambiguation) =

Moskal literally means "Muscovite" in some Slavic languages; in modern times it is considered to be an ethnic slur.

Moskal may also refer to:

- Moskal (Muscovite), stock character of the traditional Ukrainian puppet theatre form, vertep
- Moskal (surname)

== See also ==
- Moskal-Charivnyk, a 1995 Ukrainian film
