= Claudia Moscovici =

Romanian-American novelist

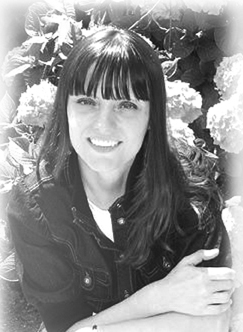
- Born: June 12, 1969 (age 57); Bucharest, Romania
- Education: Brown University (Ph.D.); Princeton University (BA)
- Occupations: Fiction writer; art critic; literary critic
- Writing career
- Language: Romanian, English, French
- Genre: Literature
- Notable work: Velvet Totalitarianism (Intre Doua Lumi) in Romania
- Movement: Postromanticism

Claudia Moscovici (born June 12, 1969) is a Romanian-American novelist and art/literary critic.

== Life ==
Moscovici was born in Bucharest, Romania. At the age of 12, she immigrated with her family to the United States where she has gone on to obtain a B.A. from Princeton University and a Ph.D. in Comparative Literature from Brown University. Moscovici taught philosophy, literature and arts and ideas at Boston University and at the University of Michigan. Born in Bucharest, Romania, she writes from her experience of life in a totalitarian regime, which marked her deeply.

== Works ==
Claudia Moscovici is the author of Velvet Totalitarianism (Rowman and Littlefield Publishing, 2009) a novel about a Romanian family's survival in an oppressive communist regime due to the strength of their love. This novel was republished in translation in her native country, Romania, under the title Intre Doua Lumi (Curtea Veche Publishing, 2011).

In 2002, she co-founded with Mexican sculptor Leonardo Pereznieto the international aesthetic movement called “Postromanticism”, devoted to celebrating beauty, passion and sensuality in contemporary art. She wrote a book on Romanticism and its postromantic survival called Romanticism and Postromanticism, (Lexington Books, 2007) and taught philosophy, literature and arts and ideas at Boston University and at the University of Michigan. Most recently, she published a nonfiction book on psychopathic seduction, called Dangerous Liaisons (Hamilton Books, 2011) and a psychological thriller called The Seducer (forthcoming in March, 2012), which tells the story of a woman lured by a dangerous psychopathic predator.

== Books ==
This bibliography is a partial list of books written by Moscovici.

Title	Publisher	Year	Genre/Subject	Length (Pages)	Notes	ISBN
Dangerous Liaisons: How to Recognize and Escape from Psychopathic Seduction	Hamilton Books	2011	Literature	230 pages	Paperback	0-7618-5569-6
What do Scott Peterson, Neil Entwistle and timeless literary seducers epitomized by Don Juan and Casanova have in common? They are charismatic, glib and seductive men who also embody the most dangerous human qualities: a breathtaking callousness, shallowness of emotion and the incapacity to love. In other words, these men are psychopaths. Unfortunately, most psychopaths don’t advertise themselves as heartless social predators. They come across as charming, intelligent, romantic and kind. Through their believable “mask of sanity,” they lure many of us into their dangerous nets. Dangerous Liaisons explains clearly what psychopaths are, why they act the way they do, how they attract us and whom they tend to target. Above all, this book helps victims find the strength to end their toxic relationships with psychopaths and move on, stronger and wiser, with the rest of their lives.
From Sex Objects to Sexual Subjects	Routledge	1996	Social science	106 pages	Paperback	0-415-91810-3
Moscovici brings together the wide-ranging discussion of subjectivity with debates about public discourse.
Romanticism and Postromanticism	Lexington Books	2007	Literary criticism and Francophone Studies	123 pages	Hardcover	0-7391-1674-6
Romanticism and Postromanticism undertakes an ambitious project: to argue for the continuing importance of Romanticism in the arts, even after modernism and postmodernism, and to support the idea of the relevance of Romanticism with an examination of a contemporary group of artists who call themselves "postromantic." Relying mainly on Gombrich's notion of there being only Romantic writers and artists (as opposed to "Romanticism") and Abrams' theory of Romanticism as an orientation rather than a unified historical movement, Moscovici sees Romanticism as a general quality that crosses time as well as typical categorizations of artists and writers.
Romanticism and Postromanticism	Lexington Books	2010	Literary criticism and Francophone Studies	123 pages (1st Edition)	Paperback	0-7391-1675-4
Romanticism and Postromanticism undertakes an ambitious project: to argue for the continuing importance of Romanticism in the arts, even after modernism and postmodernism, and to support the idea of the relevance of Romanticism with an examination of a contemporary group of artists who call themselves "postromantic." Relying mainly on Gombrich's notion of there being only Romantic writers and artists (as opposed to "Romanticism") and Abrams' theory of Romanticism as an orientation rather than a unified historical movement, Moscovici sees Romanticism as a general quality that crosses time as well as typical categorizations of artists and writers.
Velvet Totalitarianism: Post-Stalinist Romania	University Press of America	2009	Novel	403 pages	Paperback	0-7618-4693-X
Velvet Totalitarianism, addresses to any reader interested in comparing two political systems of the 80's, before and during the fall of the Iron Curtain: Eastern European totalitarianism and United States democracy. By evoking the drama of family separation and the individual lives of the characters, the author traces the general and the particular experiences of a whole category of people constrained to move between political regimes in order to find answers to the questions of their lives.
Double Dialectics: Between Universalism and Relativism in Enlightenment and Postmodern Thought	Rowman & Littlefield	2002	Philosophy	169 pages	Hardcover	0-7425-1368-8
Moscovici argues that Enlightenment philosophy has something to add to the contemporary thinking that aspires to subvert it. She grapples with the problem of truth-certainty as discussed by Kant, reformulated by d'Aembert, and critiqued by Lyotard; and examines the intersection between ethics and epistemology in Enlightenment and contemporary discourses.
Gender and Citizenship: The Dialectics of Subject-Citizenship in Nineteenth-Century French Literature and Culture	Rowman & Littlefield	2000	Literature and Francophone Studies	131 pages	Hardcover	0-8476-9694-4
Claudia Moscovici proposes a new understanding of how gender relations were reformulated by both male and female writers in nineteenth-century France.
Gender and Citizenship: The Dialectics of Subject-Citizenship in Nineteenth-Century French Literature and Culture	Rowman & Littlefield	2000	Literature and Francophone Studies	131 pages	Paperback	0-8476-9695-2
Claudia Moscovici proposes a new understanding of how gender relations were reformulated by both male and female writers in nineteenth-century France.
From Sex Objects to Sexual Subjects	Routledge	1996	Social science	106 pages	Hardcover	0-415-91810-3
Moscovici brings together the wide-ranging discussion of subjectivity with debates about public discourse.
Erotisms	University Press of America	1996	Literature and Francophone Studies	137 pages	Hardcover	0-7618-0312-2
Erotisms analyzes selected representations of women and sexual relations as they influence different aspects of life, including family relations, professional hierarchies, the field of cultural production, and artistic representations.
Erotisms	University Press of America	1996	Literature and Francophone Studies	137 pages	Paperback	0-7618-0313-0
Erotisms analyzes selected representations of women and sexual relations as they influence different aspects of life, including family relations, professional hierarchies, the field of cultural production, and artistic representations.
