= Muscal =

Muscal or Muskal may refer to:

- Muscal Mvuezolo (born 1979), Congolese-Belgian football player
- Nai (pan flute), Romanian pan flute
- Michael Muscal, American filmmaker
- Michal Yannai-Muskal (born 1972), Israeli actress and children's television host.
- Ruth Muskal (1935–2015), Israeli military commander

== See also ==
- Moskal (disambiguation), muscal in Romanian
