= Moscovici =

Moscovici is a surname, the Romanian spelling of Moskowitz. Notable people with the surname include:

- Ariel Moscovici (born 1956), Romanian-born French sculptor
- Claudia Moscovici (born 1969), Romanian-American novelist and critic
- Henri Moscovici (born 1944), Romanian-American mathematician
- Ilie Moscovici (1885–1943), Romanian socialist activist and journalist
- Josef Moscovici, an occasional alternate spelling of Joseph Moskowitz (1879–1954), Romanian-American musician and restaurateur
- Pierre Moscovici (born 1957), French politician
- Serge Moscovici (1925–2014), Romanian-born French social psychologist
- Ghiță Moscu, also known as Gelber Moscovici and Alexandru Bădulescu (1895–1938), Romanian socialist and communist activist
- Alexandru Toma, also known as Solomon Moscovici (1875–1954), Romanian poet and journalist
