= Stepan Rudansky =

Ukrainian poet

- Степан Руданський
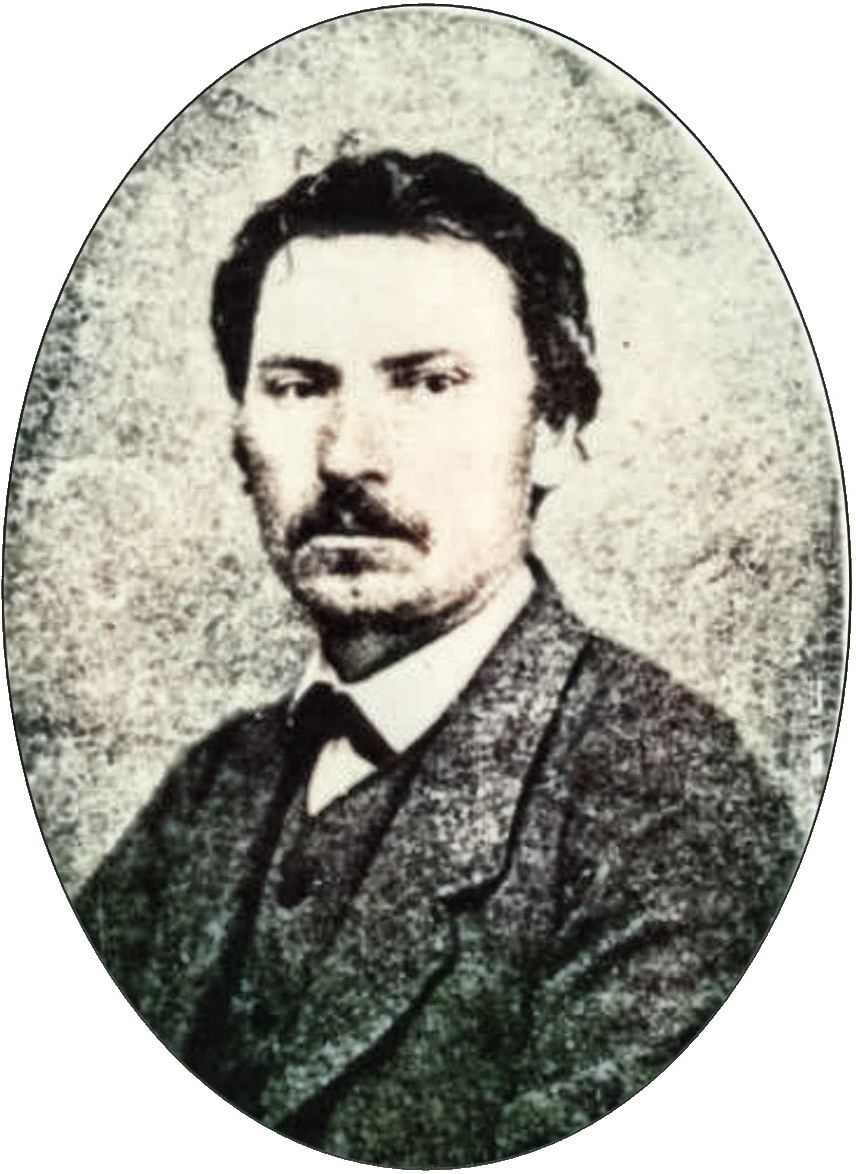
- Stepan Rudansky
- Born: 6 January 1834; Khomutyntsi, Podolia Governorate, Russian Empire (now Ukraine)
- Died: 3 May 1873 (aged 39); Yalta, Crimea
- Education: Saint-Petersburg Academy of Medicine
- Occupations: poet, physician, ethnographer, translator
- Writing career
- Language: Ukrainian
- Period: 1859-1873
- Literary movement: Romanticism, Realism

Stepan Rudansky (Ukrainian: Степан Руданський, Stepan Rudans'kyj, born 6 January 1834 - died 3 May 1873) was a Ukrainian poet. Influenced by folklore and Ukrainian authors from the previous generation, Rudansky's works transitioned from Romantic ballads to discussion of important social issues.

== Biography ==
Son of a priest, Stepan Rudansky was born on 6 January 1834 in the village of Khomutyntsi in Podolia. He began writing poetry while studying at the theological seminary in Kamianets-Podilskyi. Rudansky's first publications saw the light in 1859 during his studies in Saint-Petersburg, where he befriended a group of Ukrainian writers working in the journal Osnova. After graduation in 1861 Rudansky spent the rest of his life working as a doctor, eventually settling in Yalta, Crimea. Employed as the private medic of Prince Mikhail Semyonovich Vorontsov, he reportedly associated with his wife, Countess Elżbieta Branicka, who herself stemmed from Ukraine. Stepan Rudansky died on 3 May 1873 of tuberculosis.

== Poetry ==
Rudansky's early writings belonged to the Romantic genre and were strongly influenced by the Ukrainian folk tradition. However, under the influence of Taras Shevchenko, in his latter works he turned to more actual social topics and historical events, issuing condemnations of serfdom and calling on his colleagues and compatriots to promote Ukrainian culture. Rudansky's magnum opus is Spivomovky ("Singing Rhymes"), a compilation of various poems, jokes, proverbs and anecdotes inspired by folk culture and ridiculing different social and ethnic groups such as landlords, clerics, Gypsies, Muscovites, Poles, Jews, Germans, as well as demons, Cossacks, peasants etc. On the other hand, Rudansky's lyric poetry is filled with feelings of sadness and suffering. A number of his poems are autobiographical. Most of Rudansky's most significant works were published only posthumously, but some of his poems became so popular, that a number of them were turned into folk songs.

== Translations ==
Stepan Rudansky also engaged in translation into Ukrainian language of several classical works of literature: The Tale of Igor's Campaign, Homer's Iliad, Virgil's Aeneid, poems by Mikhail Lermontov, Heinrich Heine, Teofil Lenartowicz, Branko Radičević and others.
