= The Math Book =

Book by Clifford A. Pickover

- Author: Clifford A. Pickover
- Publisher: Sterling Publications
- Publication date: 2009

The Math Book (Sterling Publishing, 2009. ISBN 978-1-4027-5796-9) is a book by American author Clifford A. Pickover.

== Summary ==
The book contains 250 one-page articles in historical order on milestones in the history of math. Each article is followed by a related full-page color image. It also contains a bibliography for further reading.

== Reception ==
The book has consistently received good reviews although one review mentions a lack of coverage of Chinese accomplishments and another says "Alas, not all of the great mathematical milestones are included in this book ... Conversely, not all the chosen entries can be considered milestones in mathematics".

The book has been praised by Martin Gardner.

The book is the winner of the Neumann Prize.

The book has been praised by Boing Boing.
