= Paul Moskowitz =

Paul Moskowitz holding an item labeled with a Clipped Tag

Paul A. Moskowitz works at the IBM Thomas J. Watson Research Center in New York. Moskowitz is a graduate of Stuyvesant High School in New York City, received a Ph.D. in physics at New York University, and has held research and teaching positions at the Université Grenoble, Johannes Gutenberg-Universität Mainz, and at the University of Colorado Boulder. His early work in the area of nuclear physics resulted in the publication of the Moskowitz-Lombardi rule.

Moskowitz is an expert on the physics of RFID and is an inventor. He has been awarded over one hundred United States patents. He has represented IBM at the Hardware Action Group of EPCglobal. Moskowitz's area of research has centered on privacy for wireless technology, including innovation of the "Clipped Tag" for RFID consumer privacy. The Wall Street Journal has cited the Clipped Tag on its list of 2006 Technology Innovation Winners. In 2007, the RFid Gazette selected Moskowitz as one of nine individuals who are among the top 25 influencers in the RFID industry.

== The Clipped Tag for consumer privacy ==
The privacy-protecting RFID tag, the "Clipped Tag" has been suggested by IBM as a consumer privacy mechanism. The clipped tag puts the option of privacy protection in the hands of the consumer. It provides a visible means of enhancing privacy protection by allowing the transformation of a long-range tag into a proximity tag that still may be read, but only at short range – less than a few inches or centimeters. This enables later use of the tag for returns or recalls. This invention was listed among the Wall Street Journal Technology Innovation Winners for 2006. Two US patents were issued for this invention in 2007.

== Patents ==
Among Moskowitz's 140 issued US patents is United States Patent 5,528,222, "Radio frequency circuit and memory in thin flexible package". This invention forms the basis for the design of today's RFID tags for the retail supply chain. These tags are manufactured today in the hundreds of millions. The United States patent states "The elements of the package (substrate, antenna, and laminated covers) are flexible. The elements of the package are all thin. The tag is thin and flexible, enabling a unique range of applications including: RFID tagging of credit cards, passports, admission tickets, and postage stamps." This patent has been cited as a reference by over one thousand US patents. It has been the subject of litigation between some of the major players in the RFID field, e.g. between Intermec and Symbol Technologies and between Intermec and Alien Technology.

Image from US Patent 6,163,250

Another Moskowitz patent is United States Patent 6,163,250, titled "System and method for sensing objects on surface of vehicle."

According to the patent, "Typically, vehicle drivers and/or passengers place objects on, for example, the roof or hood of their vehicle. Often, the driver and/or passengers forget that they have placed the objects there, and proceed to enter the car and drive away. The objects are usually grocery or food items, or beverages such as coffee or soft drinks, etc., but may include other items. Indeed, in one reported case, a baby was placed on the top of a vehicle and the vehicle driver drove away without knowing the baby was on the roof of the vehicle. The results of this sequence of events range from the comic to the tragic."

As reported by the New York Times in 2001, the patent provides a system such that "objects adjacent or on the surface of a vehicle (e.g., on the vehicle hood, roof or trunk) can be reliably sensed and preventive measures may be taken by the driver and/or passenger."

In 2011, Google purchased the "coffee cup on the car" patent along with over one thousand other patents. According to the Wall Street Journal, "The Google spokesman declined to comment on the purchase price."

== The Moskowitz-Lombardi rule ==
While working at the University of Grenoble in France, Paul Moskowitz and French Physicist Maurice Lombardi published an empirical relation that has come to be called the Moskowitz-Lombardi rule or ML rule. The rule helps give nuclear physicists insight into the complex structure of the atomic nucleus which may contain two hundred or more individual protons and neutrons.

A charged atomic nucleus with non-zero spin produces a magnetic field whose strength may be expressed by the size of its magnetic moment μ. The magnetization may be distributed over the volume of the nucleus. The distribution of nuclear magnetization is its deviation from that of a point nucleus, and is expressed by the parameter ε. Moskowitz and Lombardi observed that for a series of ten mercury isotopes, a simple relation existed between the magnetic distribution ε and the magnetic moment μ, namely ε = α/μ, where α is a constant, "Distribution of Nuclear Magnetization in Mercury Isotopes" (Phys. Lett. 1973).

An investigation by T. Fujita and A. Arima (Nucl. Phys. 1975) found the M-L rule to yield results closer to the measured values than did calculations based upon nuclear theory. The rule has been applied to isotopes of elements including mercury, iridium, gold, thallium, platinum, tungsten, osmium, and barium. T. Asaga, et al. have proposed measuring the systematics of the nuclear properties of a series of europium isotopes to test the universality of the rule (Z. Phys. 1997). Researchers at Mainz, S. Trapp et al. (Hyperfine Interactions, 2000) have indicated that they plan to pursue experimental europium measurements. Author Clifford A. Pickover has granted permission to use information which is in his recent book, Archimedes to Hawking: Laws of Science and the Great Minds Behind Them , Oxford University Press, 2008, ISBN 978-0-19-533611-5

== Wheel of Fortune ==
According to Moskowitz's IBM web site he won $50,000 when he appeared on the popular TV game show, Wheel of Fortune.
