= Clipped tag =

Radio frequency identification tag

A clipped tag is a radio frequency identification (RFID) tag designed to enhance consumer privacy. RFID is an identification technology in which information stored in semiconductor chips contained in RFID tags is communicated by means of radio waves to RFID readers. The most simple passive RFID tags do not have batteries or transmitters. They get their energy from the field of the reader. They transfer their information to the reader by modulating the signal that is reflected back to the reader by the tag. Because tags depend on the reader for power their range is limited, typically up to 10 meters (33 ft) for UHF RFID tags.

Today, the public uses RFID tags for many applications including electronic toll collection, E-ZPass for example, or the Speedpass which is used as a credit token for the purchase of gasoline. The retail supply chain uses RFID tags to monitor the passage of pallets and cases at loading dock doors. The expectation for the future is for RFID tags to be used for the labelling of items for retail sale. Concerns for individual privacy have been raised because the RFID tags may be read by invisible radio waves without the knowledge of the holder of the tagged item.

The privacy-protecting RFID tag, the “clipped tag” has been suggested by IBM. The clipped tag puts the option of privacy protection in the hands of the consumer. After the point of sale, a consumer may tear off a portion of the tag, much like the way in which a ketchup packet is opened. This allows the transformation of a long-range tag into a proximity tag that still may be read, but only at short range – less than a few inches or centimeters. The modification of the tag may be confirmed visually. The tag may still be used later for returns, recalls, or recycling. The clipped tag was listed among The Wall Street Journal Technology Innovation Winners for 2006. Two US patents were issued for this invention in 2007.

Other mechanisms designed to protect privacy for RFID item tagging for retail use are the EPCglobal kill command and the RSA blocker tag.

== Clipped tag development ==
The concept of the clipped tag was first introduced in a paper authored by IBM researchers Paul Moskowitz and Guenter Karjoth in 2005, RFID Journal, November 7, 2005. In their paper, presented at the 2005 ACM Workshop on Privacy in the Electronic Society, the authors suggest that by providing the consumer with a means to shorten the antenna, the read range of the tag may be reduced from many meters to just a few centimeters. Several mechanisms were suggested. The mechanisms included perforating the tag like a sheet of postage stamps to allow the tearing off of a portion of the antenna. Another proposed mechanism was to manufacture the tag antenna with exposed conducting lines which could be scratched off by the consumer.

IBM teamed up with Marnlen RFiD, a manufacturer of RFID labels, and Printronix, a maker of RFID printers, to demonstrate prototypes of the Clipped Tag, Wired News, May 1, 2006. The tag took the form of a garment hang tag with v-shaped notches in the edges and perforations to direct the tearing of the tag. Reactions by RFID privacy experts were favorable to the invention. According to Wired, Robert Atkinson, president of the Information Technology and Innovation Foundation, said "The Clipped Tag shows that IBM is addressing privacy concerns, even those that are unreasonable." Subsequently, IBM and Marnlen RFiD announced that Marnlen had licensed the technology from IBM and was shipping samples to select users, RFID Update, November, 2006.
