= Wikidumper.org =

Internet blog

WikiDumper.org
- Website type: Commentary
- Owner: Clifford A. Pickover
- Creator: Clifford A. Pickover
- Website: wikidumper.org
- Commercial: No
- Launched: November 4, 2006

WikiDumper.org is a blog created by US author Clifford A. Pickover with the aim to permanently record a snapshot of the "best of the Wikipedia rejects", articles that are slated for deletion at the site.

WikiDumper was launched on November 4, 2006, and accepts user submissions. The site doesn't specify its criteria for inclusion and many of its articles don't cite their sources. The site has been criticized as likely to be less accurate than Wikipedia. Its slogan is "Knowledge's Last Chance." As of April 2021, Wikidumper was being hosted on Blogspot, with its most recent entry dating to 2013.

== See also ==
- Deletionpedia
