= Carotid–Kundalini function =

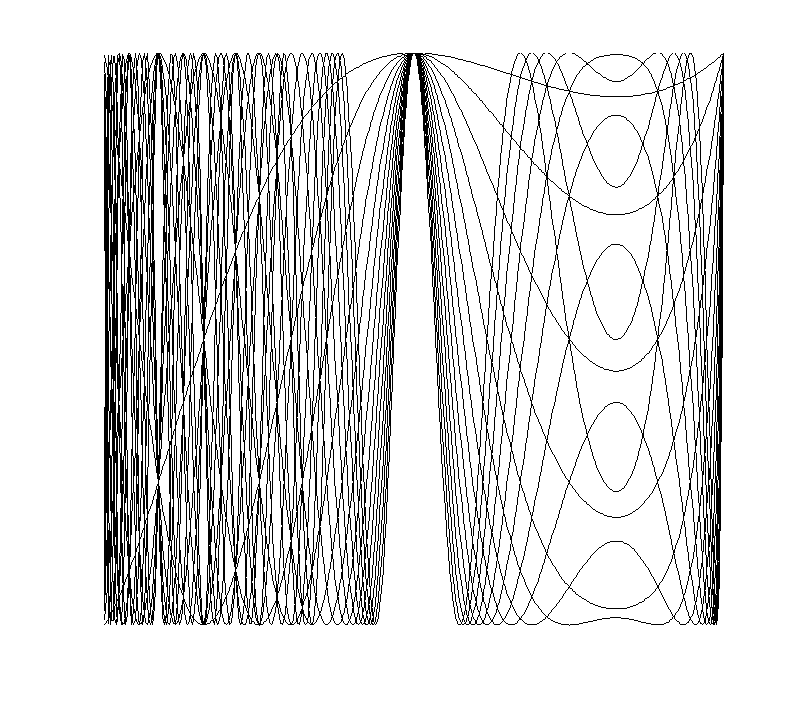
Carotid-Kundalini function

The Carotid–Kundalini function is closely associated with Carotid-Kundalini fractals coined by popular science columnist Clifford A. Pickover and it is defined as follows:

$$CK(n,x)=\cos(nx\arccos(x))$$

== See also ==
- arccos
