= Raed Bko =

Syrian footballer (born 1987)

'Raed Bko'
Personal information
- Date of birth: 8 July 1987 (age 39)
- Place of birth: Qamishli, Syria
- Height: 1.77 m (5 ft 10 in)
- Position: Defender

Team information
- Current team: Egaleo F.C.
- Number: 4

Youth career
- Al-Horriya

Senior career*
| Years | Team | Apps | (Gls) |
| 2004–2008 | Al-Horriya | 58 | (8) |
| 2008–2011 | Egaleo F.C. | 7 | |
| 2011 | Panelefsiniakos F.C. | 30 | (12) |

International career
| 2005–2006 | Syria U-20 | | |
- * Club domestic league appearances and goals as of 30 August 2010

Raed Bko (Arabic: رائد بكو; born 8 July 1987) is a Syrian football player who plays as a defender for Panelefsiniakos F.C. in the Delta Ethniki.

Bko previously played for Al-Horriya in the Syrian League.
