= Egaleo F.C. =

Men's association football team in Greece

Egaleo City
- Full name: Αθλητικός Όμιλος Αιγάλεω City; A.O. Egaleo City F.C.
- Nicknames: Το Σίτι (The City); Κυανόλευκοι (The Blue and White)
- Founded: 1931; 95 years ago
- Ground: Stavros Mavrothalassitis Stadium
- Capacity: 8,217
- Chairman: Aris Paltoglou
- Manager: Isidoros Stavrianos
- League: Gamma Ethniki
- 2025–26: Super League Greece 2 (South Group), 7th (relegated)
- Website: aoaigaleo.gr
| Home colours | Away colours |

Egaleo City F.C. (Greek: Α.Ο. Αιγάλεω City 1931) is a Greek professional football club based in Aigaleo, a suburban town in the Athens urban area, Greece. Founded in 1946, it uses all documents of previous club (Ierapolis F.C., founded in 1931). The team currently competes in the Gamma Ethniki, the third tier of Greek football and it holds home matches at Stavros Mavrothalassitis Stadium.

== History ==
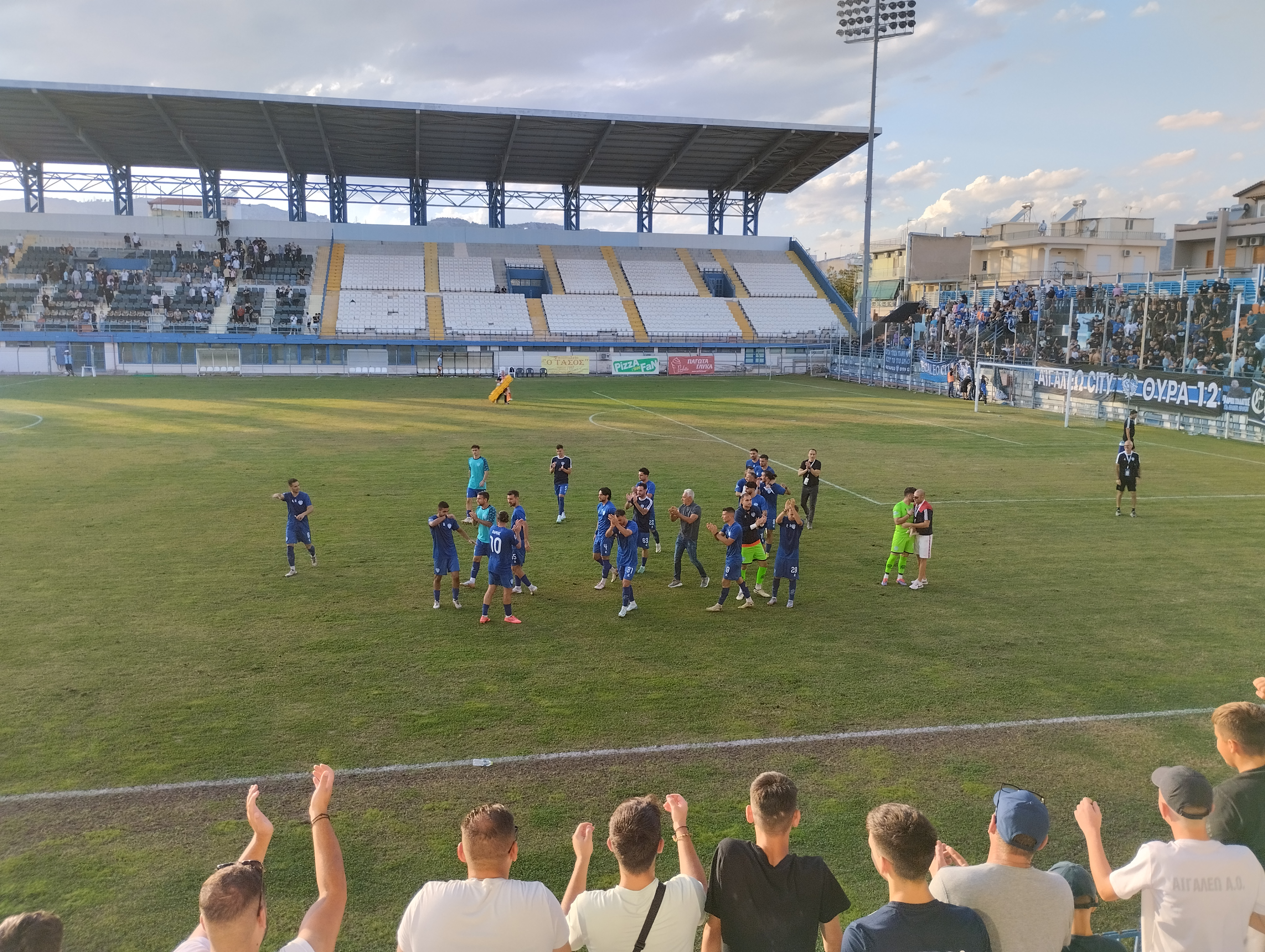
Egaleo FC players and fans during 2024/25 season.

Egaleo was founded in 1931 by Demetrios Haniotis and Georgios Aronis, as Athletic Union of Ierapolis (Αθλητική Ένωση Ιεραπόλεως – Athlitiki Enosis Ieropoleos). In 1946, three other clubs in the district merged with A.E. Ierapoleos to form Athletic Club Egaleo (Αθλητικός Όμιλος Αιγάλεω – Athlitikos Omilos Egaleo), which managed to reach for the first time the first division in 1961.

In the 2003–04 season, Egaleo managed its second better ever classification, fifth (fourth in the 1970–71 season), playing UEFA Cup for the first time in 2004–05, appearing in the group stages (after defeating Gençlerbirliği of Turkey 2–1 score on aggregate) with FK Partizan, SS Lazio, Middlesbrough and Villarreal CF, which ended with the conquest of just one point. In the league, the club finished sixth, trailing PAOK by just one point.

After a disappointing 2006–07, Egaleo was relegated back to the second level. Another relegation followed in the next year, and a third in 2008–09.

In August 2009, a merger between Egaleo and Ilisiakos F.C. took place, as the other club participated in the second division, with the purchase being made effective by Egaleo's owner Thomas Mitropoulos; the new club, which took Ilisiakos' place, was renamed Egaleo A.O.

At the end of the 2009–10 season, due to the merger being declared illegal by the Greek Council of State, Egaleo FC was relegated to the Delta Ethniki.

== Supporters ==
The ultras group Gate 12 has friendly relations with supporter groups of Bologna FC and CD Leganés The towns of Egaleo and Leganés are also sister cities, since 1980.

== Honours ==
Egaleo F.C. honours aoaigaleo.gr
| Type | Competition | Titles | Winners | Runners-up |
|---|---|---|---|---|
| Domestic | Beta Ethniki (Second-tier) | 5 | 1960–61, 1964–65, 1976–77, 1982–83, 2000–01 | |
| Domestic | Gamma Ethniki (Third-tier) | 2 | 1998–99, 2018–19 | |
| Domestic | Delta Ethniki (Fourth-tier) | 2 | 1995–96, 2012–13 | |
| Regional | Athens FCA First Division | 5 | 1959–60, 1960–61, 2014–15, 2015–16, 2016–17 | |
| Regional | Athens FCA Second Division | 2 | 1949–50, 1953–54 | |
| Regional | Athens FCA Third Division | 1 | 1947–48 | |
| Regional | Athens FCA Cup | 1 | 2014−15 | 2012−13 |

- record
- ^{S} Shared record

== European performance ==
=== Match table ===
| Season | Competition | Round | Club | Home | Away | Agg. | Qual. | Ref. |
|---|---|---|---|---|---|---|---|---|
| 2002–03 | UEFA Intertoto Cup | 3rd Round | (England) Fulham | 1–1 | 1–0 | 1–2 | | |
| 2003–04 | UEFA Intertoto Cup | 3rd Round | (Slovenia) Koper | 2–3 | 2–2 | 4–5 | | |
| 2004–05 | UEFA Cup | 1st Round | (Turkey) Gençlerbirliği | 1–0 | 1–1 | 2–1 | | |
| 2004–05 | UEFA Cup | Group Stage (Group E) | (England) Middlesbrough | 0–1 | — | 4th | | |
| 2004–05 | UEFA Cup | Group Stage (Group E) | (Serbia and Montenegro) Partizan | — | 4–0 | 4th | | |
| 2004–05 | UEFA Cup | Group Stage (Group E) | (Italy) Lazio | 2–2 | — | 4th | | |
| 2004–05 | UEFA Cup | Group Stage (Group E) | (Spain) Villarreal | — | 4–0 | 4th | | |
| 2005–06 | UEFA Intertoto Cup | 3rd Round | (Lithuania) Žalgiris | 1–3 | 2–3 | 4–5 | | |

=== Overall record ===
| Competition | Home | | | | | | | | Away | | | | | | | | Total | | | | | | | |
| Competition | Pld | W | D | L | GF | GA | GD | Win% | Pld | W | D | L | GF | GA | GD | Win% | Pld | W | D | L | GF | GA | GD | Win% |
|---|---|---|---|---|---|---|---|---|---|---|---|---|---|---|---|---|---|---|---|---|---|---|---|---|
| UEFA Cup | 3 | 1 | 1 | 1 | 3 | 3 | +0 | 33.33 | 3 | 0 | 1 | 2 | 1 | 9 | −8 | 0.00 | 6 | 1 | 2 | 3 | 4 | 12 | −8 | 16.67 |
| UEFA Intertoto Cup | 3 | 0 | 1 | 2 | 4 | 7 | −3 | 0.00 | 3 | 1 | 1 | 1 | 5 | 5 | +0 | 33.33 | 6 | 1 | 2 | 3 | 9 | 12 | −3 | 16.67 |
| Total | 6 | 1 | 2 | 3 | 7 | 10 | −3 | 16.67 | 6 | 1 | 2 | 3 | 6 | 14 | −8 | 16.67 | 12 | 2 | 4 | 6 | 13 | 24 | −11 | 16.67 |

Last updated: 4 September 2025
Source: uefa.com

=== Record by country of opposition ===
| Country | Home | | | | | | | Away | | | | | | | Total | | | | | | | |
| Country | Pld | W | D | L | GF | GA | GD | Pld | W | D | L | GF | GA | GD | Pld | W | D | L | GF | GA | GD | Win% |
|---|---|---|---|---|---|---|---|---|---|---|---|---|---|---|---|---|---|---|---|---|---|---|
| England | 2 | 0 | 1 | 1 | 1 | 2 | -1 | 1 | 0 | 0 | 1 | 0 | 1 | -1 | 3 | 0 | 1 | 2 | 1 | 3 | -2 | 00.00 |
| Italy | 1 | 0 | 1 | 0 | 2 | 2 | 0 | 0 | 0 | 0 | 0 | 0 | 0 | 0 | 1 | 0 | 1 | 0 | 2 | 2 | 0 | 50.00 |
| Lithuania | 1 | 0 | 0 | 1 | 1 | 3 | -2 | 1 | 1 | 0 | 0 | 3 | 2 | +1 | 2 | 1 | 0 | 1 | 4 | 5 | -1 | 50.00 |
| Serbia | 0 | 0 | 0 | 0 | 0 | 0 | 0 | 1 | 0 | 0 | 1 | 0 | 4 | -4 | 1 | 0 | 0 | 1 | 0 | 4 | -4 | 00.00 |
| Slovenia | 1 | 0 | 0 | 1 | 2 | 3 | -1 | 1 | 0 | 1 | 0 | 2 | 2 | 0 | 2 | 0 | 1 | 1 | 4 | 5 | -1 | 00.00 |
| Spain | 0 | 0 | 0 | 0 | 0 | 0 | 0 | 1 | 0 | 0 | 1 | 0 | 4 | -4 | 1 | 0 | 0 | 1 | 0 | 4 | -4 | 00.00 |
| Turkey | 1 | 1 | 0 | 0 | 1 | 0 | +1 | 1 | 0 | 1 | 0 | 1 | 1 | 0 | 2 | 1 | 1 | 0 | 2 | 1 | +1 | 50.00 |
| Total | 6 | 1 | 2 | 3 | 7 | 10 | -3 | 6 | 1 | 2 | 3 | 6 | 14 | -8 | 12 | 2 | 4 | 6 | 13 | 24 | -11 | 16.67 |

Last updated: 4 September 2025
Source: uefa.com

- Last entry is the match against FK Žalgiris for the 2005 UEFA Intertoto Cup third round.
- The record after the last entry is 12 matches in total (2W, 4D, 6L, GF13, GA24), with 6 home matches (1W, 2D, 3L, GF7, GA10) and 6 away matches (1W, 2D, 3L, GF6, GA14).
- Single games are considered home or away according to the team's allocation after a UEFA competition draw.

== Technical staff ==
| Name | Role |
|---|---|
| (Greece) Kostas Velitzelos | Manager |
| (Greece) Stavros Bairamis | Assistant manager |
| (Greece) Konstantinos Diallas | Fitness Coach |

== Notable former managers ==
- (Turkey) Lefter Küçükandonyadis (1965)
- (England) Les Shannon (1985)
- (Romania) Ilie Dumitrescu (2005)

== List of former players ==
Criteria

To appear in this section a player must have either:

- Played at least one season for the club.
- Set a club record or won an individual award while at the club.
- Played at least one official international match for their national team at any time.
- Performed successfully during his period in the club or at later/previous stages of his career.

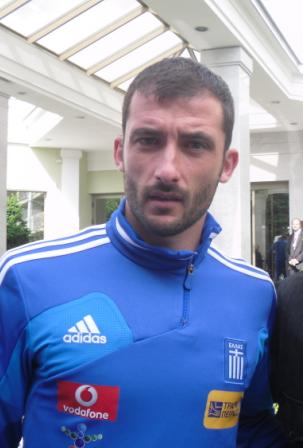
Georgios Fotakis

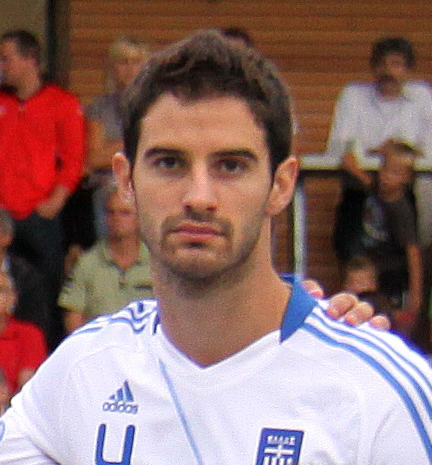
Anastasios Avlonitis

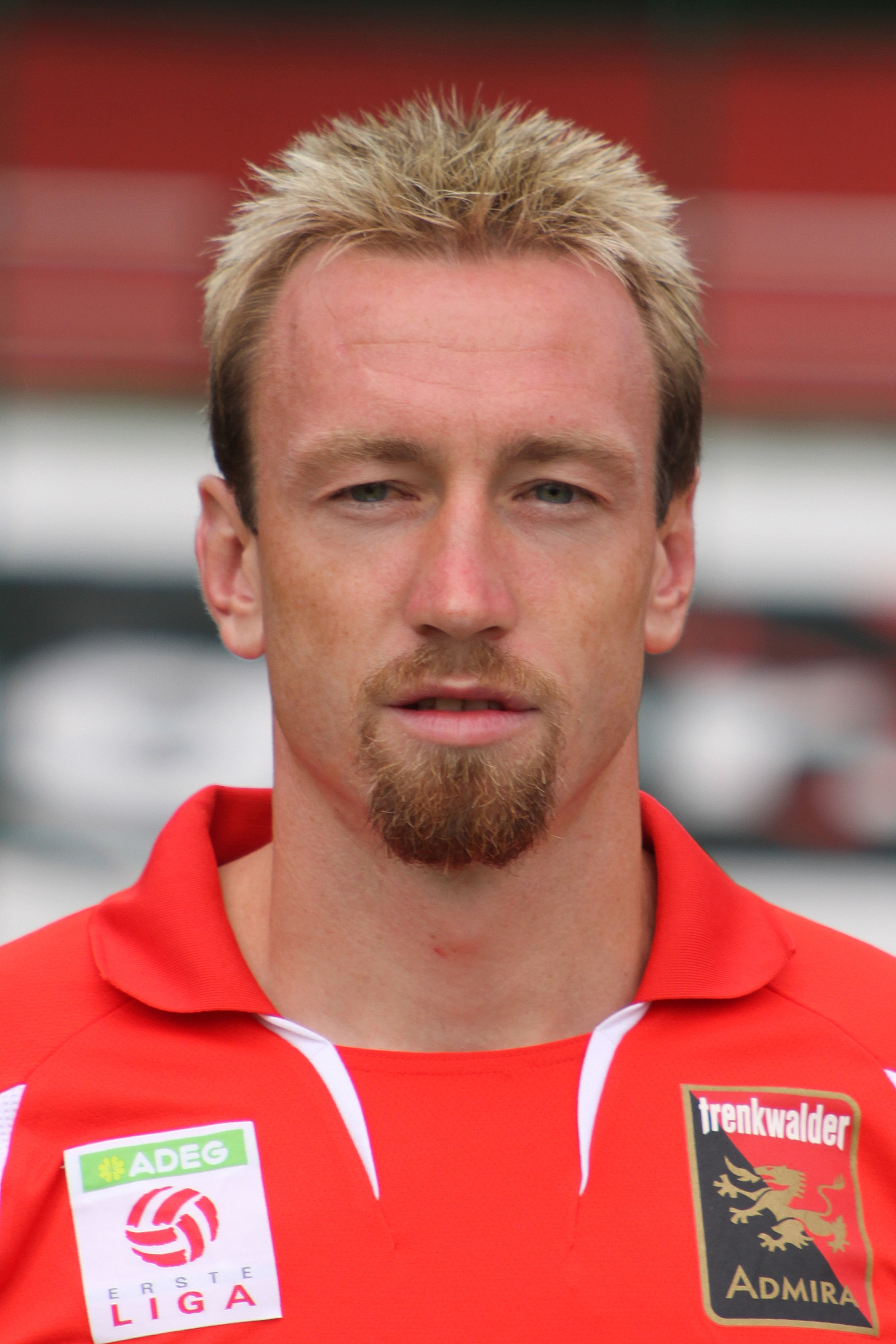
Günter Friesenbichler

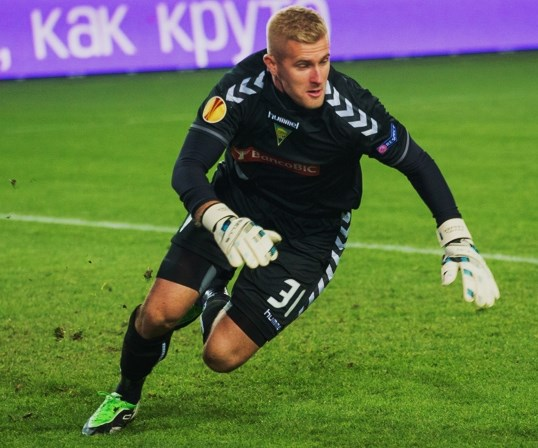
Paweł Kieszek

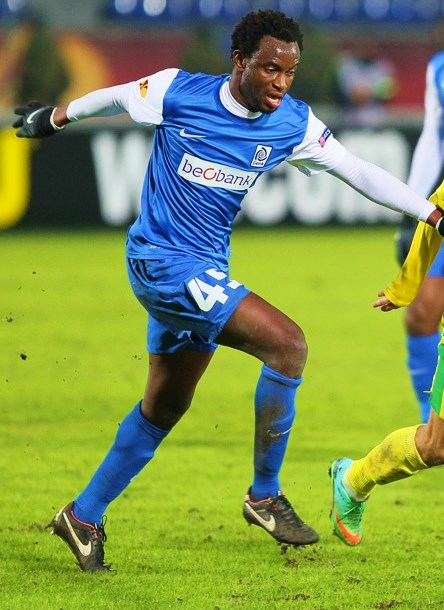
Bennard Yao Kumordzi

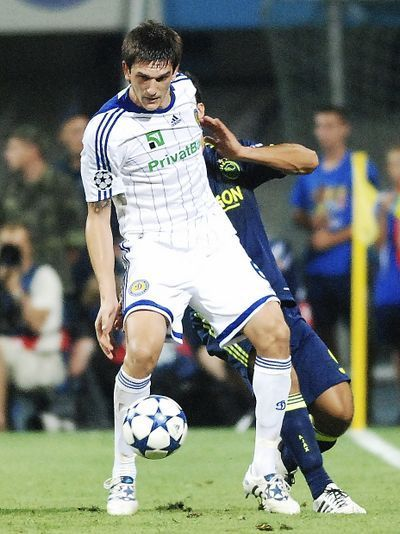
Goran Popov

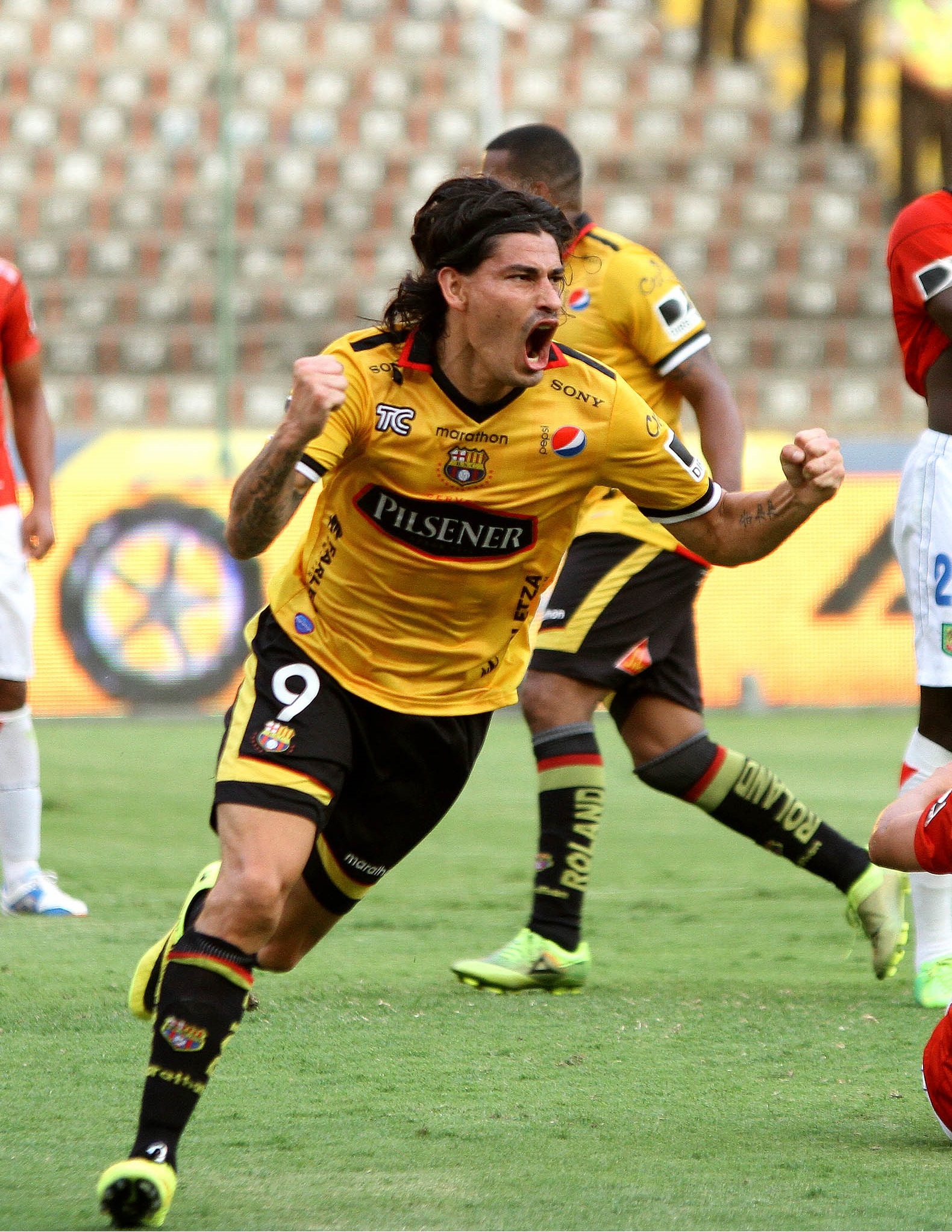
Ismael Blanco

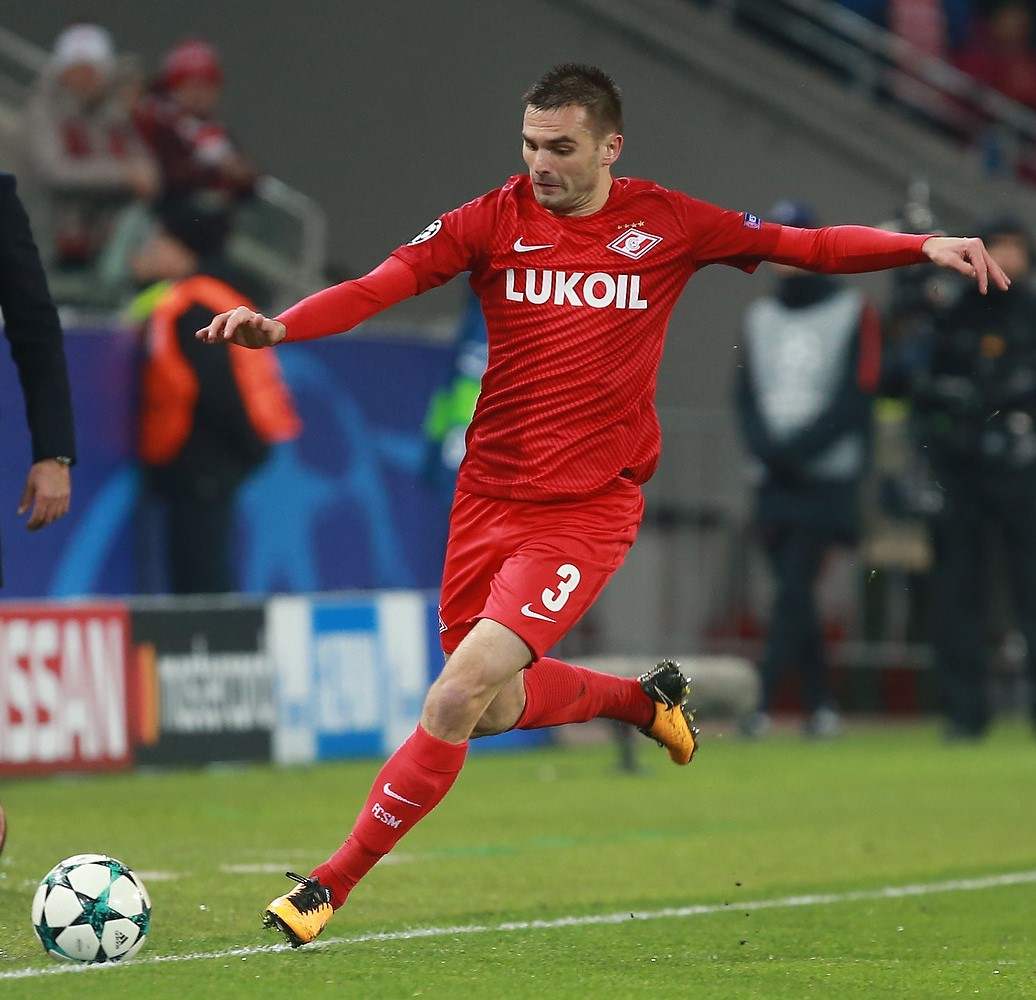
Marko Petković

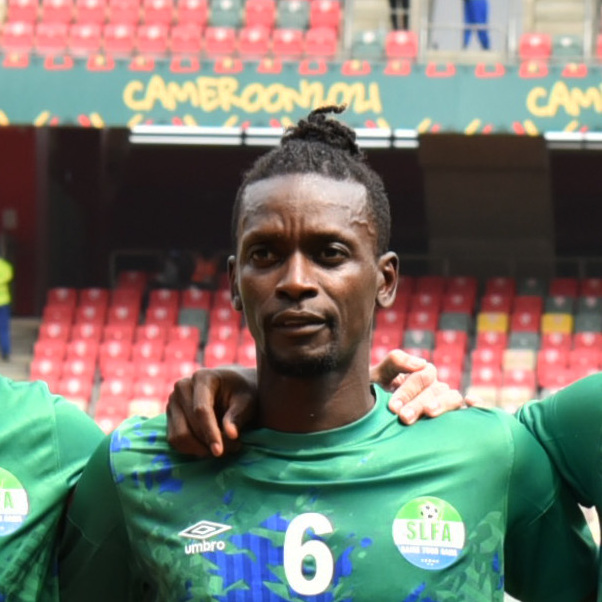
John Kamara

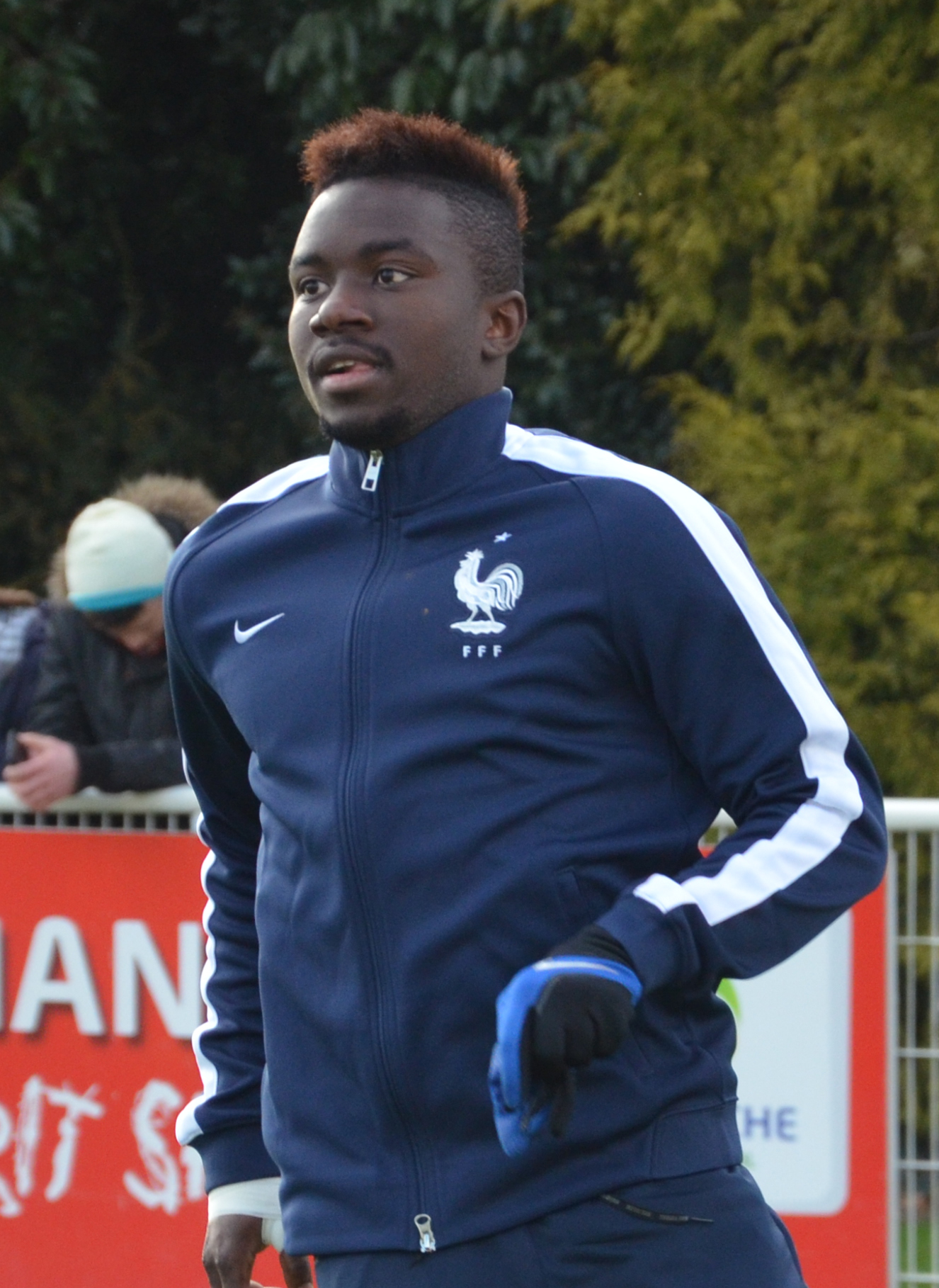
Ulrich N'Nomo

Greece

- (Greece) Giannis Marditsis (1949–59)
- (Greece) Miltos Papapostolou (1951–56)
- (Greece) Manolis Kanellopoulos (1956–62, 1965–67)
- (Greece) Kostas Chatzimichail (1959–60)
- (Greece) Sotiris Fakis (1962–67)
- (Greece) Victor Mitropoulos (1964–66, 1972–75)
- (Greece) Eleftherios Poupakis (1966–73)
- (Greece) Christos Zanteroglou (1970–73)
- (Greece) Aris Damianidis (1971–77, 1982–84)
- (Greece) Totis Filakouris (1979–81)
- (Greece) Giorgos Daditsos (1981–83)
- (Greece) Giannis Vonortas (1982–83)
- (Greece) Manolis Kottis (1984–85)
- (Greece) Charis Kopitsis (1986–87, 2001–02)
- (Greece) Lefteris Velentzas (2003)
- (Greece) Giannis Skopelitis (1997–05, 2006–07, 2017–18)
- (Greece) Kostas Papoutsis (1999–07, 2011, 2012–18)
- (Greece) Anestis Agritis (2000–07)
- (Greece) Dimitrios Konstantopoulos (2000–01)
- (Greece) Giannis Chloros (2000–06)
- (Greece) Georgios Fotakis (2000–06)
- (Greece) Georgios Alexopoulos (2001–05)
- (Greece) Manolis Psomas (2001–07)
- (Greece) Christos Moustogiannis (2001–08, 2010)
- (Greece) Giorgos Barkoglou (2003–05)
- (Greece) Antonis Petropoulos (2003–07, 2019–20)
- (Greece) Anastasios Avlonitis (2007–10)
- (Greece) Lefteris Matsoukas (2008)
- (Greece) Anestis Nastos (2009–10)
- (Greece) Sotiris Leontiou (2016)
- (Greece) Grigoris Papazacharias (2018–19)
- (Greece) Giannis Bastianos (2022–23)
- (Greece) Paris Babis (2023–25)

Rest of Europe

- (Albania) Agustin Kola (1991–92)
- (Albania) Antonio Miço (2024)
- (Austria) Günter Friesenbichler (2004–05)
- (Bulgaria) Ivan Rusev (2000)
- (Croatia) Marko Marić (2005–07)
- (Croatia) Danijel Cesarec (2005–07)
- (Croatia) Hrvoje Jančetić (2006–08)
- (Croatia) Duje Baković (2010)
- (Italy) Luigi Cennamo (1999–00, 2004–09)
- (Montenegro) Srđan Kljajević (2003–05)
- (North Macedonia) Goran Popov (2005–08)
- (North Macedonia) Dragan Stojkov (2008)
- (Poland) Paweł Kieszek (2006)
- (Poland) Wojciech Szymanek (2006–07)
- (Serbia) Aleksandar Stojanović (1983–85)
- (Serbia) Marko Petković (2023)
- (Serbia) Nenad Gavrić (2023)
- (Turkey) (Greece) Aleko Yordan (1969–71)

Americas

- (Argentina) Juan Forchetti (2007–08)
- (Argentina) Ismael Blanco (2020)
- (Brazil) Rogério Martins (2018, 2019–20)

Africa

- (Cameroon) Jean Dénis Wanga (2001–04)
- (Cameroon) (France) Ulrich N'Nomo (2025–)
- (Democratic Republic of the Congo) (Belgium) Muscal Mvuezolo (2003)
- (Ghana) Daniel Edusei (2002–08)
- (Ghana) Kofi Amponsah (2005)
- (Ghana) Bennard Yao Kumordzi (2006–07)
- (Guinea) Salim Cissé (2020)
- (Lebanon) Olivier Makor (2001–02)
- (Mali) Mahamadou Sidibè (2002–06)
- (Nigeria) Suleiman Omo (2005–08)
- (Sierra Leone) John Kamara (2023–24)

Asia

- (Iran) Faraz Fatemi (1999–00)
- (Syria) Raed Bko (2008–11)

== Notable chairmen ==
- (Greece) Giorgos Martinis (first chairman)
- (Greece) Nikolaos Michos
- (Greece) Dimitris Chaniotis
- (Greece) Giannis Tresos
- (Greece) Giorgos Karabateas
- (Greece) Giannis Panteliadis
- (Russia) Dimitri Tusmanov
- (Greece) Yiorghos Dalakouras
- (Greece) Alexandros Stavropoulos
- (Greece) Christos Kanellopoulos
- (Greece) Victor Mitropoulos
- (Greece) Dimitris Kalogeropoulos
- (Greece) Alexis Kougias
- (Greece) Ioannis Paltoglou

== Bibliography ==
- Νικολαΐδης, Νίκος Δ. (2006). Ιστορία του Αιγάλεω...από τις λαμαρίνες στα σαλόνια της Ευρώπης. Όλη η πορεία στο χρόνο της αγαπημένης μας ομάδας (in Greek). Αθήνα, Ελλάδα: Εκδόσεις Έμβρυο. ISBN 978-960-8002-42-5.
- Νικολαΐδης, Νίκος Δ. (2011). Εκεί, εκεί, στη Β’ Εθνική! Απ’ τα ντέρμπι του ‘60 στα μπαράζ του νέου αιώνα (in Greek). Αθήνα, Ελλάδα. ISBN 978-960-93-2735-0.
- Νικολαΐδης, Νίκος Δ. (2012). Απ΄τη Γ΄Εθνική στο Περιφερειακό, 1965-2012 (in Greek). Αθήνα, Ελλάδα. ISBN 978-618-80048-0-1.
