= Moskal =

Historical or pejorative designation for Russians

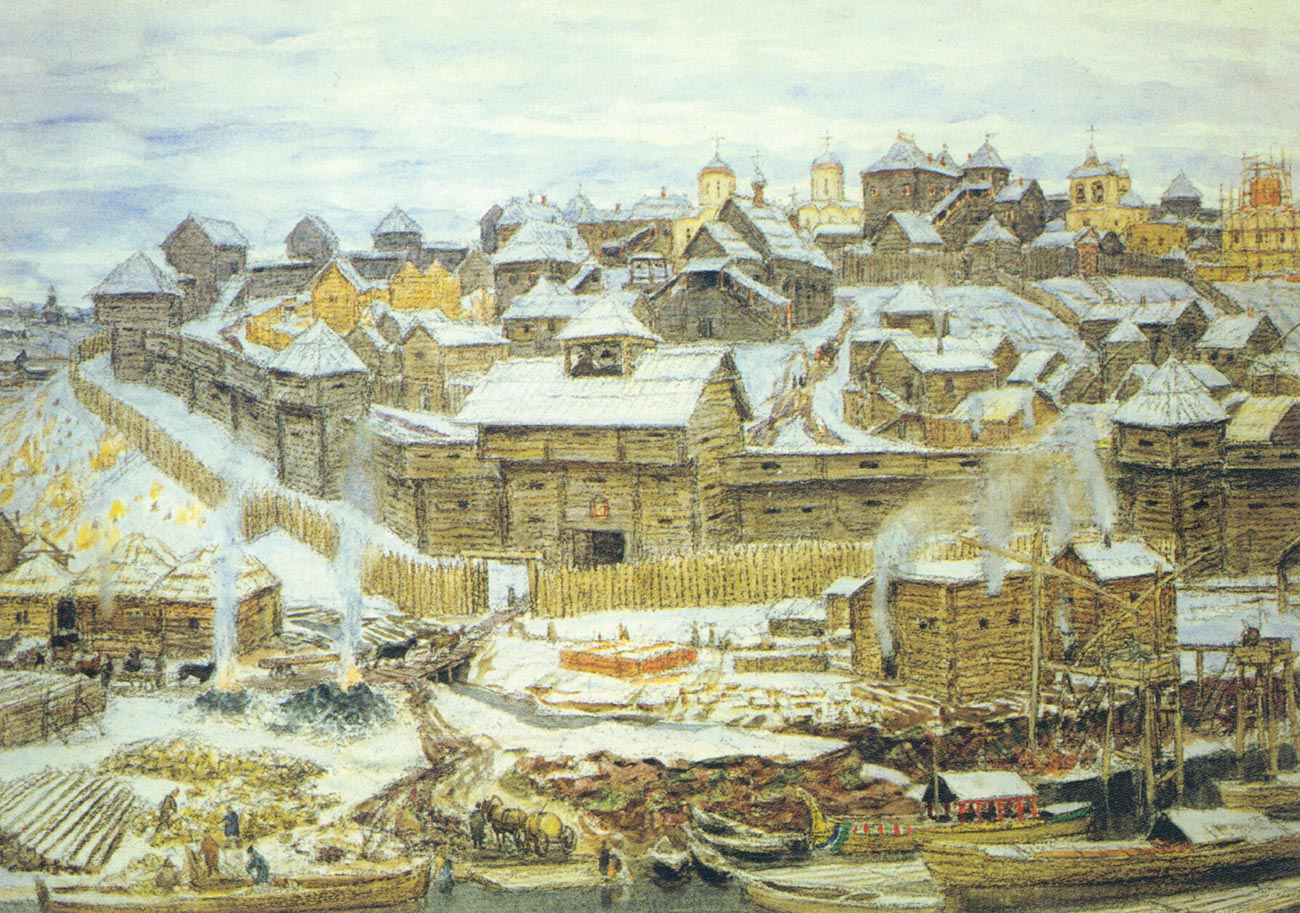
The Moscow Kremlin under Prince Ivan Kalita in the early 14th century, depicted by 19th century painter Apollinary Vasnetsov.

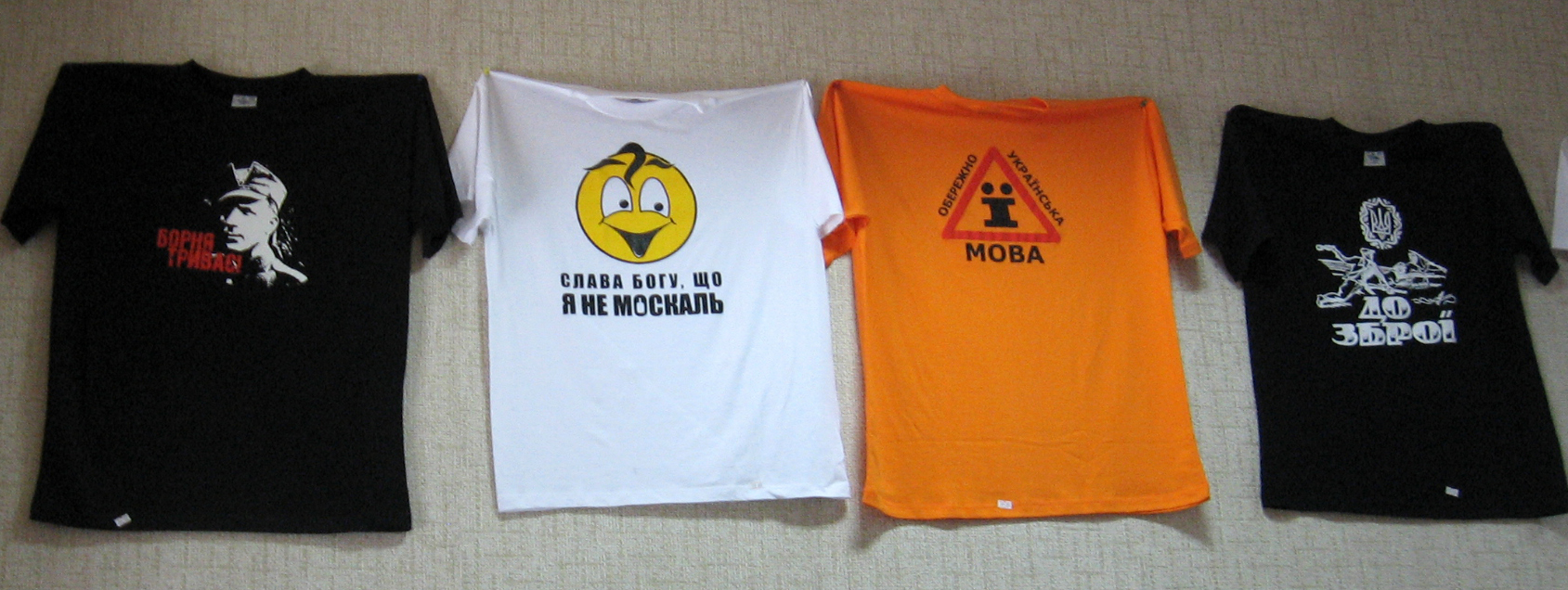
Text in Ukrainian on a white T-shirt: "Слава Богу, що я не москаль" (Slava Bohu, shcho ya ne moskal), transl. Thank God I am not a Moskal

Moskal (Note: Native words in neighboring cultures: Russian and Ukrainian: москаль; Belarusian: маскаль; Polish: moskal; Romanian: muscal; Hungarian: muszka; Lithuanian: maskolis) is a designation historically used for the residents of the Grand Duchy of Moscow from the 12th to the 15th centuries. It is now sometimes used in Ukraine, Poland, and Romania as an ethnic slur for Russians.

The term is generally considered to be derogatory or condescending and reciprocal to the Russian term khokhol for Ukrainians. Another ethnic slur for Russians is kacap in Polish, or кацап (katsap) in Ukrainian.

== History and etymology ==
Initially, as early as the 12th century, moskal referred to the residents of Muscovy, the word literally translating as "Muscovite" (differentiating the residents of the Grand Duchy of Moscow from other East Slavs such as people from White Ruthenia (Belarusians), Red Ruthenia (Ukrainians), and others). With time, the word became an archaism in all the East Slavic languages, and survived only as a family name in each of those languages—see below.

The negative connotation in Ukraine came in around the late 18th-early 19th centuries in the form of an ethnic slur labelling all Russians. At that time, since the 1654 Pereiaslav Agreement of Cossacks with Moscow the majority of Russians in Ukrainian lands were soldiers of the Imperial Russian Army (and in fact at that time the term "moskal" was synonymous with the word "soldier"), as well as Russian bureaucrats, Russian nobles that were granted estates there, and merchants. All these categories were disliked by the locals.

== Cultural influence ==
The "Moskal" is a stock character of the traditional Ukrainian puppet theatre form, vertep.

It also gave rise to a number of East Slavic family names: Moskal, Moskalyov, Moskalenko, Moskalik, Moskalyuk, Moskalchuk, Moskalyonok, Moskalenkov.

== See also ==
- Anti-Russian sentiment in Ukraine
- List of ethnic slurs
- Orc (slang)
- Vatnik
- Tibla
- Moskalik (disambiguation)
