= James Madison Freedom of Information Award =

The James Madison Freedom of Information Award is a San Francisco Bay Area honor given to individuals and organizations who have made significant contributions to the advancement of freedom of expression, particularly freedom of information (as in freedom of information legislation and open government).

The award is intended to reflect the spirit of former U.S. statesman and president James Madison, traditionally regarded as the "Father of the United States Constitution" and primary author behind the George Mason-inspired United States Bill of Rights, and in particular the First Amendment.

The award goes to media and community organizations, journalists, students, and citizens from the nine-county Bay Area who have defended public access to government meetings, public records, and court proceedings, or who have furthered other more general issues of freedom of expression and information.

== Notable recipients ==
- Sen. Quentin L. Kopp (1991 and 1993, public official)
- Marilyn Hall Patel, U.S. District Court, Northern California (1993, judge)
- Ben Bagdikian, author and professor (1995, lifetime achievement)
- Nicholson Baker, author (1997, citizen)
- Lawrence Ferlinghetti, poet (2000, lifetime achievement)
- Electronic Frontier Foundation (2000, online free speech)
- SF Weekly (2002, online reporting)
- San Francisco Bay Guardian (2002, public service)
- Hon. Ronald M. George, Chief Justice, California Supreme Court (2003, lifetime achievement)
- Daniel Ellsberg, Pentagon Papers whistleblower (2004, lifetime achievement)
- Cartoon Art Museum and Rex Babin, The Sacramento Bee (2004, cartoonist)
- Joel Moskowitz (2018), health guidelines for mobile phones
- San Francisco Bay Guardian
- David Weir (2020), contributions to transparency
- Tyler Shultz, Theranos whistleblower (2017, whistleblower)

== See also ==
- William O. Douglas Prize
