= Joel Moskowitz =

American researcher

- Education: Rutgers University, University of California, Santa Barbara
- Known for: Research into health effects of mobile phones and Wireless technologies
- Awards: James Madison Freedom of Information Award (2018)
- Scientific career
- Fields: Public health
- Workplaces: University of California, Berkeley

Joel M. Moskowitz is a researcher on the faculty of the School of Public Health at the University of California, Berkeley. He has worked on public health issues that include cell phone risk, tobacco control, and alcohol abuse. He helped the city of Berkeley, California to draft an ordinance mandating safety warnings on cell phones. In 2018, Moskowitz won the James Madison Freedom of Information Award for his work in bringing to light previously publicly unknown California Department of Public Health guidance documents about cell phone safety.

== Biography ==
Moskowitz was educated at Rutgers University (BA in mathematics), University of California, Santa Barbara (MA and PhD in social psychology), and served as a postdoctoral fellow at Northwestern University in evaluation research and methodology.

He is Director and Principal Investigator of the Center for Family and Community Health at the University of California, Berkeley. Since 2009, Moskowitz has been disseminating research on wireless technology, public health and policy.

== Mobile phones ==
=== Meta-analysis ===
Moskowitz coauthored a 2009 meta-analysis of 23 studies of mobile phone usage and risk of tumors, which concluded that studies with low bias revealed "possible evidence linking mobile phone use to an increased risk of tumors." A few months later, Moskowitz's work was mentioned in the Huffington Post by epidemiologist Devra Davis, who stated his findings concurred with other research, and that "the French are not waiting for further research on this matter, and are taking steps based on the notion that it is better to be safe than sorry", and that she and Moskowitz and "experts from a number of countries" agreed with the French approach. Moskowitz also wrote an op-ed in the San Francisco Chronicle stating that nine nations had issued precautionary warnings about mobile phones, and arguing that "it is time for our government to require health warnings and publicize simple steps to reduce the health risks of cell phone use".

=== "Right to Know" law ===
In 2015, the city of Berkeley, California, passed a "Right to Know" law that mandated electronics retailers to advise customers about cellphone hazards. Moskowitz had been involved in creating the law and had testified in its support, and his views were covered in Mother Jones and CNN. Moskowitz described the law as "a crack in the wall of denial...." CNN reported that Moskowitz was involved in creating the new mobile phone law, quoting him as stating that the new law's information disclosure requirement went beyond previous regulations by "stating that children and anyone carrying their phone in a pocket or bra could be at increased risk of radiation exposure."

=== Guideline disclosure lawsuit ===
In 2016, Moskowitz sued the State of California to force disclosure of mobile phone safety guidelines that it had prepared, but never released. Moskowitz's requests for copies of the guidelines had been repeatedly denied in 2014. The two-page guidelines included statements that the electromagnetic fields (EMFs) emitted by mobile phones "can pass deeper into a child’s brain than an adult’s," and that "The brain is still developing through the teen years, which may make children and teens more sensitive to EMF exposure."

The California Department of Public Health released copies of the guidelines on March 2, 2017, after a Sacramento Superior Court judge indicated she would order their disclosure, and after the state was told by the San Francisco Chronicle that it was publishing news coverage of the case. Stanton Glantz, a prominent researcher on the health effects and control of tobacco, described the history of Moskowitz's legal procedure on his blog, claiming that the presiding Superior Court Judge Shellyanne Chang "overruled eight of the nine objections submitted by the state," and directed release of the guidance document. But

before the judge could issue her final ruling, the CDPH [California Department of Public Health] emailed the 2014 version of the cell phone use guidance document, entitled "Cell Phones and Health," to a San Francisco Chronicle reporter... The two-page fact sheet was marked: "Draft and Not for Public Release." In her final ruling dated March 13, 2017, http://bit.ly/MvCDPHfinal, Judge Chang ruled the document is not a draft, and ordered it to be released to Dr. Moskowitz without the "Draft" markings.

Moskowitz has alleged that the stamping of the document, according to KPIX-TV, as "essentially creating a new document." Moskowitz's legal victory was later noted by media that included the Boston Globe, where he was quoted with reference to the possible withholding of information by the Massachusetts Department of Public Health, as well as by The Mercury News, KGO-TV, KCRA-TV, and the Huffington Post.

A few months after Moskowitz's legal aftermath, on December 13, 2017, the California Department of Public Health released an official guidance document about cellphone radiation, characterized in Huffington Post as an "updated version of the documents the public health department released under pressure." With regard to the new official guidance document, CNET quoted Moskowitz as stating that "although California's new cell phone warnings underplay the state of the science, many people consider this action by the largest state public health department to be a significant development," and that he "would like to thank the current leadership of CDPH for their courage to stand up to a powerful industry." Moskowitz stated that section about the effects of wireless radiation on children's to be particularly positive.

=== James Madison Freedom of Information Award ===
For his work on cell phone radiation, the Northern California branch of the Society of Professional Journalists gave Moskowitz a 2018 James Madison Freedom of Information Award. On its website, the journalists' Society noted that "Moskowitz... successfully sued the state under the California Public Records Act, securing the release of a report on cell phone radiation commissioned by California’s Department of Public Health." The University of California reported that Moskowitz was "grateful to more than 200 journalists in 48 countries who reported on the CDPH cell phone safety guidance," and quoted him as stating that

The release of this document by CDPH and the ensuing worldwide news coverage has helped to raise awareness about a major global public health problem--exposure to cell phone and wireless radiation has contributed to increased risk of male and female infertility, neurologic disorders, and cancer.

=== Other activities and coverage ===
Moskowitz's views have been noted by local media. Time magazine quoted Moskowitz views on Cell phone radiations. And Reader's Digest also noted Moskowitz's views. IEEE Spectrum has discussed Moskowitz's allegation that FCC tests investigated only phones directly supplied by the manufacturers Bloomberg News has quoted Moskowitz's appraisals of the implications of new research studies, the Chicago Tribune, Reader's Digest and various other media and he has been noted on media platforms such as Psychology Today.

Moskowitz has promoted a petition about the alleged health risks of 5G technologies. In March 2019, the British tabloid Daily Mail ran a headline implying that the petition had singled out potential dangers from Apple's Airpods. Later that month, the fact-checking website Snopes published an investigation debunking the claim. In July 2019, the Office of Communications and Public Affairs of the University of California, Berkeley, published an audio podcast and transcript of Moskowitz's talk, "Cell Phones, Cell Towers and Wireless Safety".

== Tobacco ==
Moskowitz has also been quoted in media coverage of cigarettes and health, one area in which he has done research. The Daily Californian quoted his statement that "the whole movement toward changing norms within our society with regards to tobacco use has been driven by people acting at the community level, creating laws."

== Criticism ==
In 2017, the American Council on Science and Health, criticized Moskowitz, suggesting that he is spreading cherry-picked and misleading information about wireless radiations.

== Publications (selected) ==
- Moskowitz, Joel M. (October 17, 2019). "We Have No Reason to Believe 5G Is Safe". Scientific American Blog Network.
- Myung, Seung-Kwon; Ju, Woong; McDonnell, Diana D.; Lee, Yeon Ji; Kazinets, Gene; Cheng, Chih-Tao; Moskowitz, Joel M. (November 2009). "Mobile Phone Use and Risk of Tumors: A Meta-Analysis". Journal of Clinical Oncology. 27 (33): 5565–5572. doi:10.1200/JCO.2008.21.6366. PMID 19826127. S2CID 17095080.
- Sagar, Sanjay; Adem, Seid M.; Struchen, Benjamin; Loughran, Sarah P.; Brunjes, Michael E.; Arangua, Lisa; Dalvie, Mohamed Aqiel; Croft, Rodney J.; Jerrett, Michael; Moskowitz, Joel M.; Kuo, Tony; Röösli, Martin (May 2018). "Comparison of radiofrequency electromagnetic field exposure levels in different everyday microenvironments in an international context". Environment International. 114: 297–306. Bibcode:2018EnInt.114..297S. doi:10.1016/j.envint.2018.02.036. PMID 29529581.
- Moskowitz, Joel M.; Lin, Zihua; Hudes, Esther S. (May 2000). "The impact of workplace smoking ordinances in California on smoking cessation". American Journal of Public Health. 90 (5): 757–761. doi:10.2105/AJPH.90.5.757. PMC 1446239. PMID 10800425.
- Moskowitz, J M (January 1989). "The primary prevention of alcohol problems: a critical review of the research literature". Journal of Studies on Alcohol. 50 (1): 54–88. doi:10.15288/jsa.1989.50.54. PMID 2648075.
