= Laurence Moskowitz =

Entrepreneur known to broadcast public relations

Laurence Moskowitz is a communications executive and entrepreneur best known for his contributions to broadcast public relations.

Moskowitz founded Medialink Worldwide, considered to be one of the largest contributors to the development of the video news release, a public relations information distribution technique. For his work at Medialink, Moskowitz was listed as one of the “Top 10 Most Influential PR people in the 20th Century” by PRWeek magazine.

He is the co-founder and current CEO of Lumentus, a strategic communications and digital reputation management firm based in New York.

== Early life and education ==
Born in Philadelphia, Moskowitz obtained a Bachelor of Arts in journalism from Pennsylvania State University.

== Career ==
Upon graduation, Moskowitz joined United Press International, where he worked as a reporter and editor. In 1976, he founded Mediawire, a regional press release distribution newswire in Pennsylvania. He sold the company to United Business Media of the United Kingdom in 1984 and became a vice president at its subsidiary, PR Newswire.

In 1986, he founded Medialink Worldwide, which quickly became the world’s leading broadcast public relations provider. He guided the company through its initial public offering in 1997, led by Dean Witter. As chairman, president and CEO, PR Week said that Moskowitz is “widely credited with having founded the discipline as we know it.”

Medialink, based in New York, had 7 offices in United States, its European headquarters in London, and 22 affiliated companies in Europe, Asia, the Middle East and South Africa. Many Fortune 100 companies were clients, including General Motors, IBM, Johnson & Johnson, Sony and Pfizer.

Lumentus, which Moskowitz co-founded in 2009, also established Lumentus Social in 2013, which provides a platform for businesses and franchisees to distribute curated content to help businesses maintain their social media pages. In 2019, Moskowitz announced the launch of Lumentus Lightbox, a search analytics tool for professional communicators.

Moskowitz has been a co-board chair of the National Theatre of the Deaf since 2003.
