= Biomorph (video game) =

2024 video game

- Developer: Lucid Dreams Studio
- Publisher: Lucid Dreams Studio
- Director: Hélène Poulin
- Producer: Maxime Grégoire
- Designer: Gabriel Bradley
- Programmer: Francis Lapierre
- Artists: Véronique Bellavance; Angéline Beaulieu; Margaux Caron-Théberge; Christian Haguenauer; Annie Rodrigue
- Composer: William Gough
- Engine: Unity
- Platforms: Microsoft Windows; PlayStation 5; Xbox Series X/S; Nintendo Switch
- Release: Microsoft Windows; April 5, 2024; PlayStation 5; November 22, 2024; Xbox Series X/S; February 26, 2025; Nintendo Switch; April 3, 2025
- Genres: Action-adventure, Metroidvania, platformer
- Mode: Single player

Biomorph (stylized in all caps) is a soulslike Metroidvania video game developed and published by indie company Lucid Dreams Studio. The game was released for Microsoft Windows on April 5, 2024, for PlayStation 5 on November 22, for Xbox Series X/S on February 26, 2025, and for Nintendo Switch on April 3, 2025.

== Development ==
Biomorph is developed by Lucid Dreams Studio, an independent game development studio from Canada. It was announced in August 2022, with a gameplay reveal trailer unveiling at Gamescom. Originally set to release on March 4, 2024, Lucid Dreams announced that the game will be pushed back to April 5 to "avoid a crowded window" and "polish the game to perfection". Ubisoft Montreal funded and provided support for the game's development.

== Reception ==
Biomorph received "mixed or average" reviews from critics, according to the review aggregation website Metacritic. Fellow review aggregator OpenCritic assessed that the game received weak approval, being recommended by 63% of critics.

It was nominated for Game of the Year at the Canadian Game Awards of 2024.
