= Moskalenko =

Moskalenko is a Ukrainian surname literally meaning "son of moskal". Notable people with the name include:

- Alexander Moskalenko (born 1969), Russian trampolinist
- Anastasiia Moskalenko (born 2000), Ukrainian Paralympian
- Karinna Moskalenko (born 1954), Russian human rights lawyer
- Kirill Moskalenko (1902–1985), Marshal of the Soviet Union
- Larisa Moskalenko (born 1963), Soviet-Ukrainian sailor
- Mitrofan Moskalenko (1896–1966), Soviet naval officer
- Nikolay Moskalenko (born 1990), Russian football goalkeeper
- Vitaliy Moskalenko (born 1974), Russian triple jumper
- Yaroslav Moskalenko (born 1975), Ukrainian politician
