= Clifford A. Pickover =

American inventor and author (b. 1957)

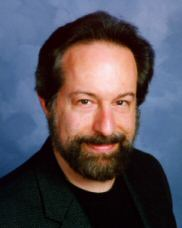
- Born: Clifford Alan Pickover; August 15, 1957 (age 69)
- Education: Yale University (PhD 1982); Franklin and Marshall College
- Known for: Pickover stalks Vampire numbers
- Scientific career
- Fields: Mathematics
- Workplaces: Thomas J. Watson Research Center
- Website: www.pickover.com

Clifford Alan Pickover (born August 15, 1957) is an American author, editor, and columnist in the fields of science, mathematics, science fiction, innovation, and creativity. For many years, he was employed at the IBM Thomas J. Watson Research Center in Yorktown, New York, where he was editor-in-chief of the IBM Journal of Research and Development. He has been granted more than 835 U.S. patents, is an elected Fellow for the Committee for Skeptical Inquiry, and is author of more than 50 books, translated into more than a dozen languages.

== Life, education and career ==
Pickover's works have often dealt with higher dimensions, computer art, and visualization.

Pickover graduated first in his class from Franklin and Marshall College, after completing the four-year undergraduate program in three years. He received his PhD in 1982 from Yale University's Department of Molecular Biophysics and Biochemistry, where he conducted research on X-ray scattering and protein structure.

Pickover was elected as a Fellow for the Committee for Skeptical Inquiry for his "significant contributions to the general public's understanding of science, reason, and critical inquiry through their scholarship, writing, and work in the media." Other Fellows have included Carl Sagan and Isaac Asimov. He has been awarded over 835 United States patents, and his The Math Book was winner of the 2011 Neumann Prize.

He joined IBM at the Thomas J. Watson Research Center in 1982, as a member of the speech synthesis group and later worked on the design-automation workstations. For much of his career, Pickover has published technical articles in the areas of scientific visualization, computer art, and recreational mathematics.

He is currently an associate editor for the scientific journal Computers and Graphics and is an editorial board member for Odyssey and Leonardo. He is also the Brain-Strain columnist for Odyssey magazine, and, for many years, he was the Brain-Boggler columnist for Discover magazine.

Pickover has received more than 100 IBM invention achievement awards, three research division awards, and four external honor awards.

== Work ==
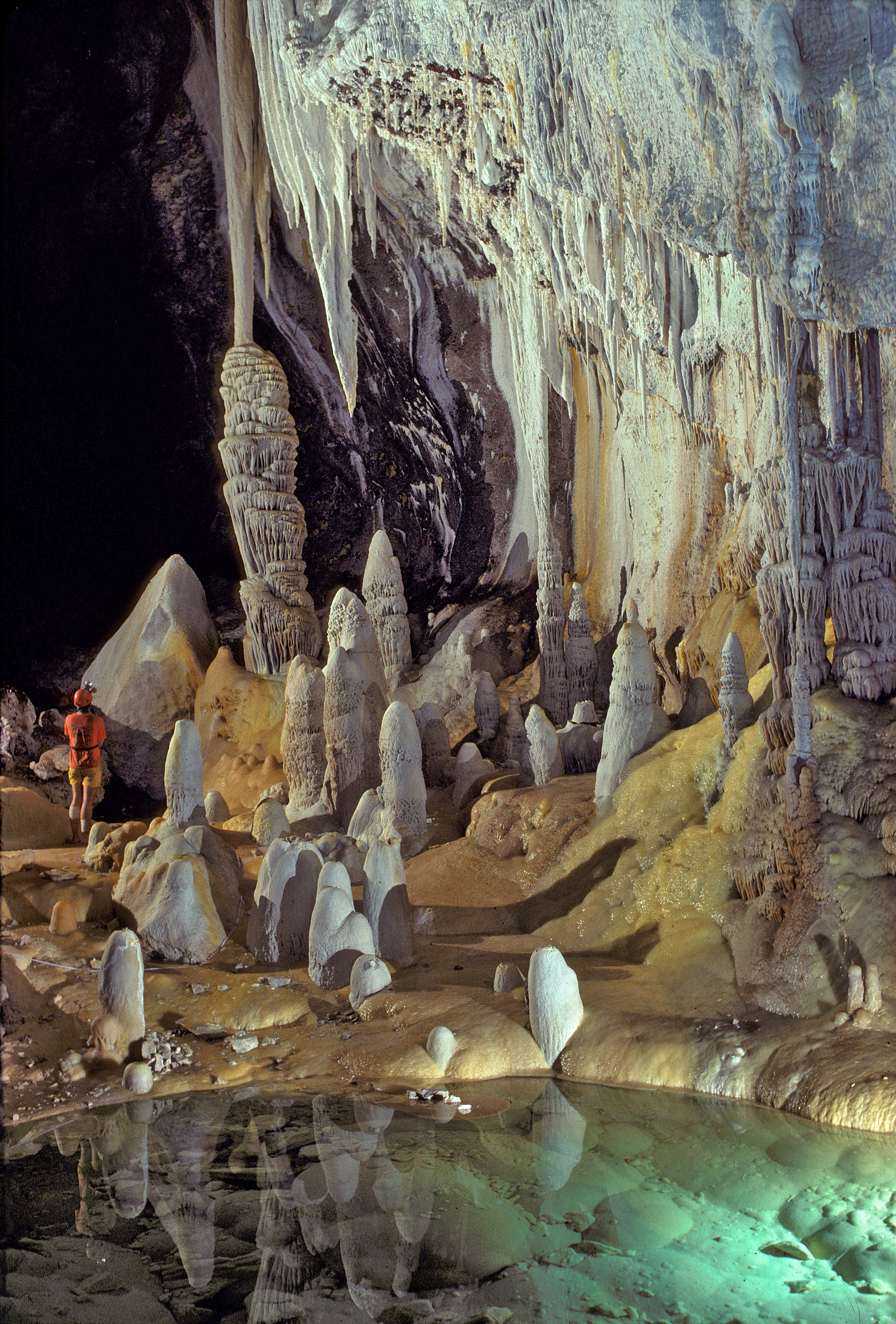
In the 1990s, Pickover created virtual caverns from extremely simple numerical simulations that reminded him of the Lechuguilla Cave, pictured here.

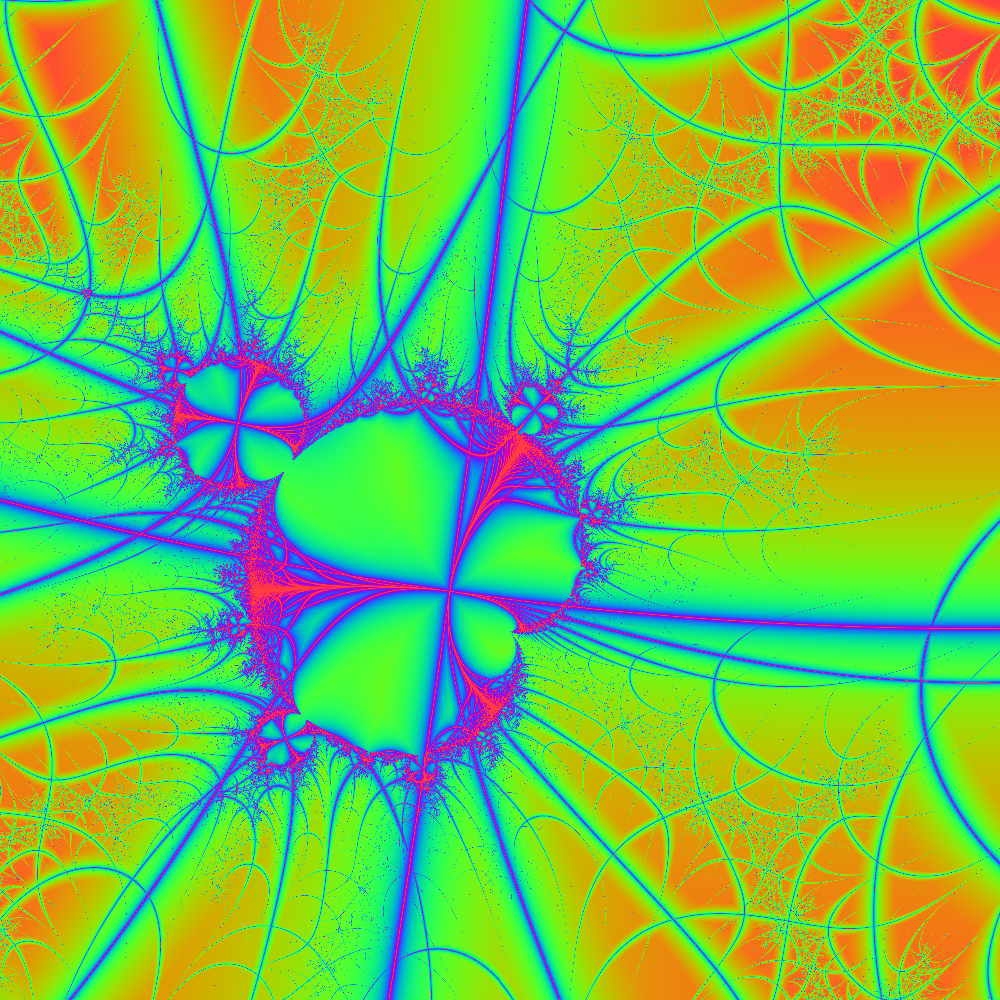
Example of Pickover stalks in a detail of the Mandelbrot set

Pickover's primary interest is in finding new ways to expand creativity by melding art, science, mathematics, and other seemingly disparate areas of human endeavor. In The Math Book and his companion book The Physics Book, Pickover explains that both mathematics and physics "cultivate a perpetual state of wonder about the limits of thoughts, the workings of the universe, and our place in the vast space-time landscape that we call home." Pickover is an inventor with over 835 patents, the author of puzzle calendars, and puzzle contributor to magazines geared to children and adults. His Neoreality and Heaven Virus science-fiction series explores the fabric of reality and religion.

Pickover is author of hundreds of technical papers in diverse fields, ranging from the creative visualizations of fossil seashells, genetic sequences, cardiac and speech sounds, and virtual caverns and lava lamps, to fractal and mathematically based studies. He also has published articles in the areas of skepticism (e.g. ESP and Nostradamus), psychology (e.g. temporal lobe epilepsy and genius), and technical speculation (e.g. "What if scientists had found a computer in 1900?" and "An informal survey on the scientific and social impact of a soda can-sized super-super computer"). Additional visualization work includes topics that involve breathing motions of proteins, snow-flake like patterns for speech sounds, cartoon-face representations of data, and biomorphs.

Pickover has also written extensively on the reported experiences of people on the psychotropic compound DMT. Such apparent entities as Machine Elves are described as well as "Insects From A Parallel Universe".

On November 4, 2006, he began Wikidumper.org, a popular blog featuring articles being considered for deletion by English Wikipedia.

=== Pickover stalks ===
Pickover stalks are certain kinds of details that are empirically found in the Mandelbrot set in the study of fractal geometry. In the 1980s, Pickover proposed that experimental mathematicians and computer artists examine the behavior of orbit trajectories for the Mandelbrot set in order to study how closely the orbits of interior points come to the x and y axes in the complex plane. In some renditions of this behavior, the closer that the point approaches, the higher up the color scale, with red denoting the closest approach. The logarithm of the distance is taken to accentuate the details. This work grew from his earlier work with Julia sets and "Pickover biomorphs," the latter of which often resembled microbes.

=== Frontiers of Scientific Visualization ===
In "Frontiers of Scientific Visualization" (1994) Pickover explored "the art and science of making the unseen workings of nature visible". The books contains contributions on "Fluid flow, fractals, plant growth, genetic sequencing, the configuration of distant galaxies, virtual reality to artistic inspiration", and focuses on use of computers as tools for simulation, art and discovery.

=== Visualizing Biological Information ===
In "Visualizing Biological Information" (1995) Pickover considered "biological data of all kinds, which is proliferating at an incredible rate". According to Pickover, "if humans attempt to read such data in the form of numbers and letters, they will take in the information at a snail's pace. If the information is rendered graphically, however, human analysts can assimilate it and gain insight much faster. The emphasis of this work is on the novel graphical and musical representation of information containing sequences, such as DNA and amino acid sequences, to help us find hidden pattern and meaning".

=== Vampire numbers and other mathematical highlights ===
In mathematics, a vampire number or true vampire number is a composite natural number v, with an even number of digits n, that can be factored into two integers x and y each with n/2 digits and not both with trailing zeroes, where v contains all the digits from x and from y, in any order. x and y are called the fangs. As an example, 1260 is a vampire number because it can be expressed as 21 × 60 = 1260. Note that the digits of the factors 21 and 60 can be found, in some scrambled order, in 1260. Similarly, 136,948 is a vampire because 136,948 = 146 × 938.

Vampire numbers first appeared in a 1994 post by Clifford A. Pickover to the Usenet group sci.math, and the article he later wrote was published in chapter 30 of his book Keys to Infinity.

In addition to "Vampire numbers", a term Pickover actually coined, he has coined the following terms in the area of mathematics: Leviathan number, factorion, Carotid–Kundalini function and fractal, batrachion, Juggler sequence, and Legion's number, among others. For characterizing noisy data, he has used Truchet tiles and Noise spheres, the later of which is a term he coined for a particular mapping, and visualization, of noisy data to spherical coordinates.

In 1990, he asked "Is There a Double Smoothly Undulating Integer?", and he computed "All Known Replicating Fibonacci Digits Less than One Billion". With his colleague John R. Hendricks, he was the first to compute the smallest perfect (nasik) magic tesseract. The "Pickover sequence" dealing with e and pi was named after him, as was the "Cliff random number generator" and the Pickover attractor, sometimes also referred to as the Clifford Attractor.

=== Culture, religion, belief ===
Starting in about 2001, Pickover's books sometimes began to include topics beyond his traditional focus on science and mathematics. For example, Dreaming the Future discusses various methods of divination that humans have used since stone-age times. The Paradox of God deals with topics in religion. Perhaps the most obvious departure from his earlier works includes Sex, Drugs, Einstein, and Elves: Sushi, Psychedelics, Parallel Universes, and the Quest for Transcendence, which explores the "borderlands of science" and is "part memoir and part surrealist perspective on culture.". Pickover follows-up his "quest for transcendence" and examination of popular culture with A Beginner's Guide to Immortality: Extraordinary People, Alien Brains, and Quantum Resurrection.

=== History of science and mathematics ===
Starting in 2008, Pickover's books began to focus on the history of science and mathematics, with such titles as Archimedes to Hawking, as well as The Math Book, The Physics Book, and The Medical Book—a trilogy of more than 1,500 pages that presents various historical milestones, breakthroughs, and curiosities.

=== WikiDumper.org ===
Wikidumper.org is a website created by Pickover that promises to permanently record a snapshot of the "best of the English Wikipedia rejects", articles that are slated for deletion at the English Wikipedia. WikiDumper was launched on November 4, 2006, and accepts user submissions. Although the site doesn't specify its criteria for inclusion, many of its articles don't cite their sources. The site has been criticized as likely to be less accurate than English Wikipedia.

== Publications ==
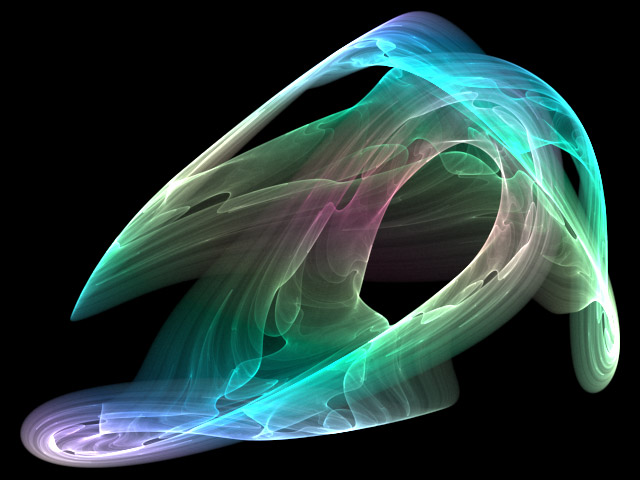
Visualization of chaotic attractor. Pickover's earliest books often focused on patterns that characterize mathematics such as fractals, chaos, and number theory. Computer graphics, reminiscent of this chaotic attractor, were common in his early works.

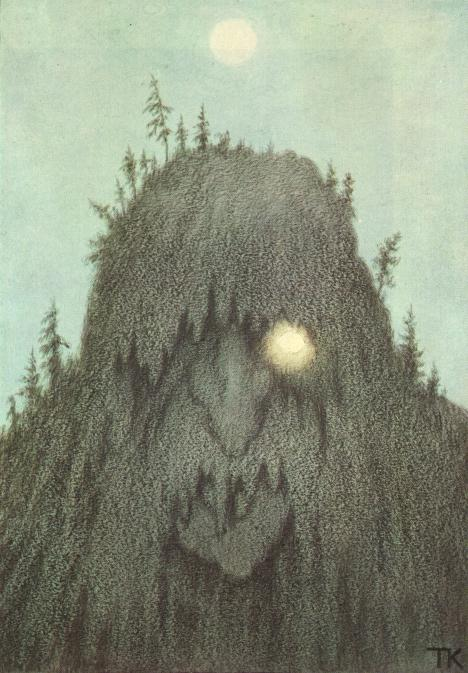
Forest troll. (Theodor Kittelsen, 1906). Some of Pickover's later books often discussed "science at the edges," including such topics as parallel universes, quantum immortality, alien life, and elf-like beings seen by some people who use dimethyltryptamine.

Pickover is author of over forty books on such topics as computers and creativity, art, mathematics, black holes, human behavior and intelligence, time travel, alien life, Albert Einstein, religion, dimethyltryptamine elves, parallel universes, the nature of genius, and science fiction.

=== Books ===
- 1990. Computers, Pattern, Chaos, and Beauty. St. Martin's Press. ISBN 0-486-41709-3
- 1991. Computers and the Imagination. St. Martin's Press.
- 1992. Mazes for the Mind. St. Martin's Press.
- 1994. Chaos in Wonderland. St. Martin's Press.
- 1995. Keys to Infinity. Wiley.
- 1996. Black Holes: A Traveler's Guide. Wiley.
- 1997. The Alien IQ Test. Basic Books.
- 1997. The Loom of God. Plenum.
- 1998. Spider Legs. With Piers Anthony TOR.
- 1998. The Science of Aliens. Basic Books.
- 1998. Time: A Traveler's Guide. Oxford University Press.
- 1999. Strange Brains and Genius: The Secret Lives of Eccentric Scientists and Madmen, Harper Perennial/Quill, ISBN 0-688-16894-9
- 1999. Surfing Through Hyperspace. Oxford University Press.
- 2000. Cryptorunes: Codes and Secret Writing. Pomegranate.
- 2000. The Girl Who Gave Birth to Rabbits. Prometheus.
- 2000. Wonders of Numbers. Oxford University Press.
- 2001. Dreaming the Future. Prometheus.
- 2001. The Stars of Heaven. Oxford University Press.
- 2002. The Zen of Magic Squares, Circles, and Stars. Princeton University Press. ISBN 0-691-11597-4
- 2002. The Mathematics of Oz. Cambridge University Press. ISBN 0-521-01678-9
- 2002. The Paradox of God and the Science of Omniscience. St. Martin's Press. ISBN 1-4039-6457-2
- 2003. Calculus and Pizza. John Wiley & Sons. ISBN 0-471-26987-5
- 2005. Sex, Drugs, Einstein, and Elves. Smart Publications. ISBN 1-890572-17-9
- 2005. A Passion for Mathematics, John Wiley & Sons. ISBN 0-471-69098-8
- 2006. The Mobius Strip, Thunder's Mouth Press. ISBN 1-56025-826-8
- 2007. A Beginner's Guide to Immortality. Thunder's Mouth Press. ISBN 978-1-56025-984-8
- 2007. The Heaven Virus. Lulu. ISBN 978-1-4303-2969-5
- 2008. Archimedes to Hawking: Laws of Science and the Great Minds Behind Them. Oxford University Press. ISBN 978-0-19-533611-5
- 2009. Jews in Hyperspace. Kindle Edition.
- 2009. The Loom of God. Sterling Publishing. ISBN 978-1-4027-6400-4
- 2009. The Math Book: From Pythagoras to the 57th Dimension, 250 Milestones in the History of Mathematics. Sterling Publishing. ISBN 978-1-4027-5796-9
- 2011. The Physics Book: From the Big Bang to Quantum Resurrection. Sterling Publishing. ISBN 978-1-4027-7861-2
- 2012. The Medical Book: From Witch Doctors to Robot Surgeons. Sterling Publishing. ISBN 978-1-4027-8585-6
- 2012. Brain Strain: A Mental Muscle Workout That's Fun!. Cricket Media.
- 2013. The Book of Black: Black Holes, Black Death, Black Forest Cake and Other Dark Sides of Life, Calla Editions. ISBN 978-1606600498
- 2014. The Mathematics Devotional: Celebrating the Wisdom and Beauty of Mathematics. Sterling Publishing. ISBN 978-1454913221.
- 2015. The Physics Devotional: Celebrating the Wisdom and Beauty of Physics. Sterling Publishing . ISBN 978-1454915546
- 2015. Death and the Afterlife: A Chronological Journey, from Cremation to Quantum Resurrection. Sterling Publishing. ISBN 978-1454914341
- 2018. The Science Book: From Darwin to Dark Energy. Sterling Publishing. ISBN 978-1454930068
- 2019. Artificial Intelligence: An Illustrated History, From Medieval Robots to Neural Networks. Sterling Publishing. ISBN 978-1454933595
- Mind-Bending Puzzles (calendars & cards), Pomegranate, each year

=== Neoreality science fiction series ===
- 2002. Liquid Earth. The Lighthouse Press, Inc.
- 2002. The Lobotomy Club. The Lighthouse Press, Inc.
- 2002. Sushi Never Sleeps. The Lighthouse Press, Inc.
- 2002. Egg Drop Soup. The Lighthouse Press, Inc. ISBN 0-9714827-9-9

=== Edited collections ===
- 1992. Spiral Symmetry, World Scientific. ISBN 981-02-0615-1
- 1993. Visions of the Future: St. Martin's Press.
- 1994. Frontiers of Scientific Visualization. Wiley.
- 1995. Future Health: Computers & Medicine in the 21st Century. St. Martin's Press.
- 1995. The Pattern Book: Fractals, Art, and Nature. World Scientific.
- 1995. Visualizing Biological Information. World Scientific.
- 1996. Fractal Horizons. St. Martin's Press,
- 1998. Chaos and Fractals. Elsevier.

== See also ==
- Factorion
- Juggler sequence
- Pickover stalk
- Vampire number
