= Moskalik (surname) =

Moskalik (Russian: Москалик) is an East Slavic surname. Notable people with the surname include:

- Kastus Moskalik (1918–2010), Belarusian Greek Catholic priest
- Yaroslav Moskalik (1966–2025), Russian general
