= Muscal Mvuezolo =

Congolese-Belgian footballer

Personal information
- Full name: Muscal Mvuezolo-Musumbu
- Date of birth: 30 March 1979 (age 47)
- Place of birth: Kinshasa, Zaire
- Height: 1.75 m (5 ft 9 in)
- Position: Midfielder

Senior career*
Years	Team	Apps	(Gls)
1995–1996	Union SG		
1996–1999	KV Mechelen	33	(1)
1999–2000	Anderlecht	0	(0)
2000–2002	Yimpaş Yozgatspor	15	(0)
2002–2003	FC Denderleeuw	21	(0)
2003	Egaleo	3	(0)
2003–2005	Kalamata	10	(1)
2005–2006	Akratitos	15	(0)
2006	Ilisiakos	8	(0)
2006–2007	Union SG	28	(1)
2007–2010	Tubize	98	(3)
2010–2011	Politehnica Iași	4	(0)
2011–2016	RRC Waterloo		

International career
2008	DR Congo	1	(0)
- * Club domestic league appearances and goals as of 3 January 2016

Muscal Mvuezolo-Musumbu (born 30 March 1979 in Kinshasa) is a Congolese-Belgian football player who last played for RRC Waterloo in Belgium.

== International ==
He made his first cap for Congo DR national football team against Gabon on 25 March 2008.
