= Kastus Moskalik =

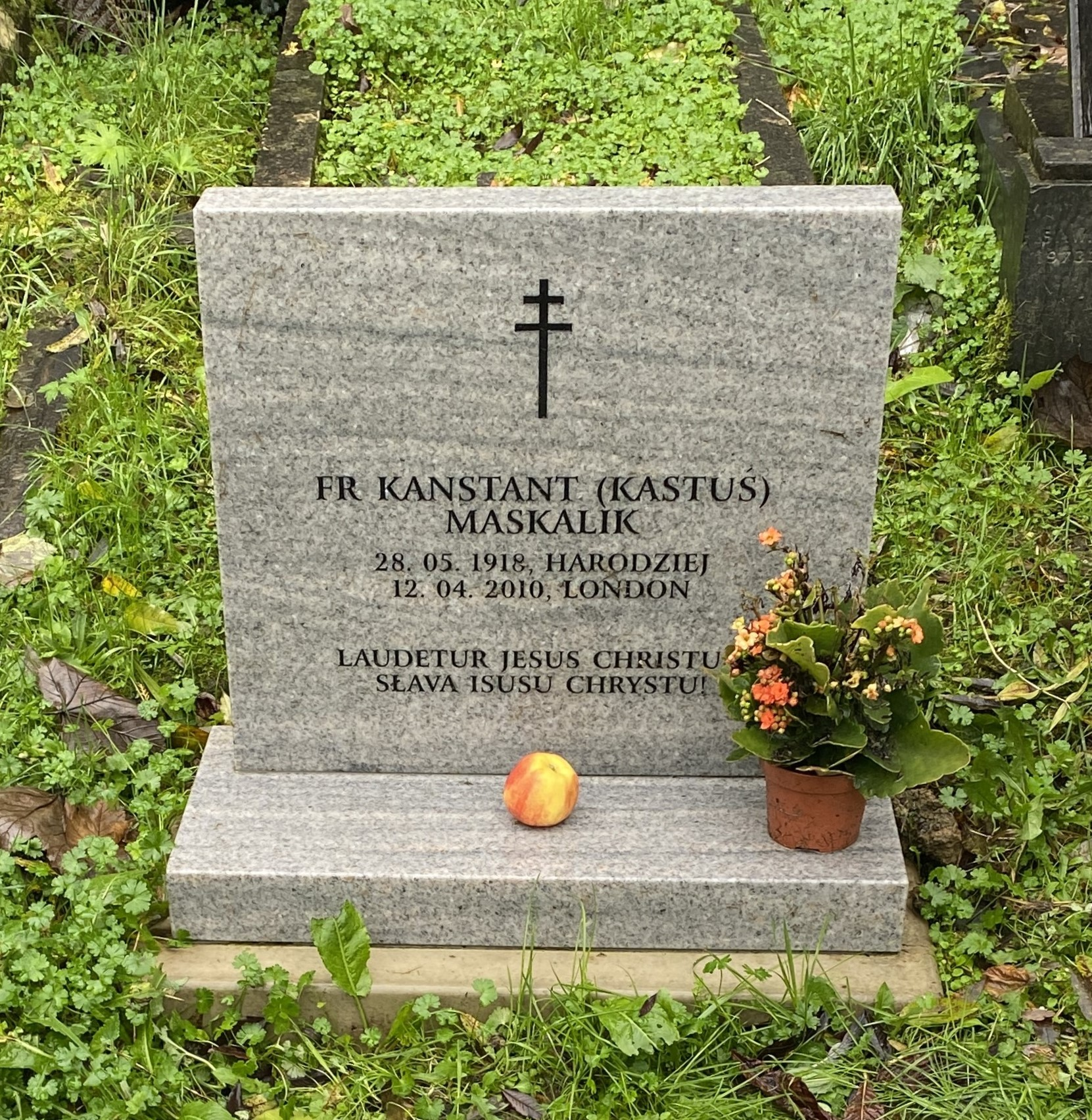
Grave of Kastuś Maskalik (Moskalik) in London

Kastus (Constantine) Moskalik (Belarusian: Кастусь Маскалік, romanized: Kastuś Maskalik; 28 May 1918 in Haradzeya, Belarus – 12 April 2010 in London, United Kingdom) was a Belarusian Greek Catholic priest.

== Biography ==
Born on 28 May 1918 in Haradzeya, Minsk Oblast, Kastus Moskalik was orphaned early and raised in a family of relatives. He studied at the seven-year school, then two years at Zhrovichi Orthodox monastery. In August 1941 he was mobilized into the Red Army. Later joined the Anders Army (2nd Polish Corps), with whom was Iran, Iraq, Palestine and Egypt. In 1944 was in Italy, took part in the Battle of Monte Cassino. In 1947 he entered the Gregorian University in Rome, finished Russicum. He was ordained to the priesthood on April 10, 1955 in Rome, by Ukrainian Archbishop Ivan Buchko. Six months later was sent to London, where he served as a priest at the Belarusian Catholic mission. In 1958 he moved to Paris, where he was appointed head of the Belarusian Catholic Mission in France. From 1962 to 1984 he worked in the Belarusian version of Vatican Radio, founded by Peter Tatarinovich. From 1985 he worked in London in the Belarusian Greek Catholic mission. He died on 12 April 2010 in London.
