= Gombrich =

Gombrich is a surname. Notable people with the surname include:

- Sir Ernst Gombrich (1909–2001), Austrian-born art historian
- Richard Gombrich (born 1937), British Indologist and scholar of Buddhism, son of Ernst
- Carl Gombrich (born 1965), British interdisciplinary educator and academic, son of Richard
