= RSA blocker tag =

Device blocker

An RSA blocker tag (or RSA tag) is a RFID tag that responds positively to all unauthorized requests, thus blocking some scanners from reading any RFID tags placed nearby. The tags are designed to protect privacy, and are supposedly unable to be used for theft, denials of service, and other malicious uses.

Other mechanisms designed to protect privacy for RFID item tagging for retail use are the EPCglobal kill command and the Clipped Tag proposed by IBM.

== See also ==
- Contactless smart card
