= Pickover stalk =

Inherent structure of the mandelbrot set

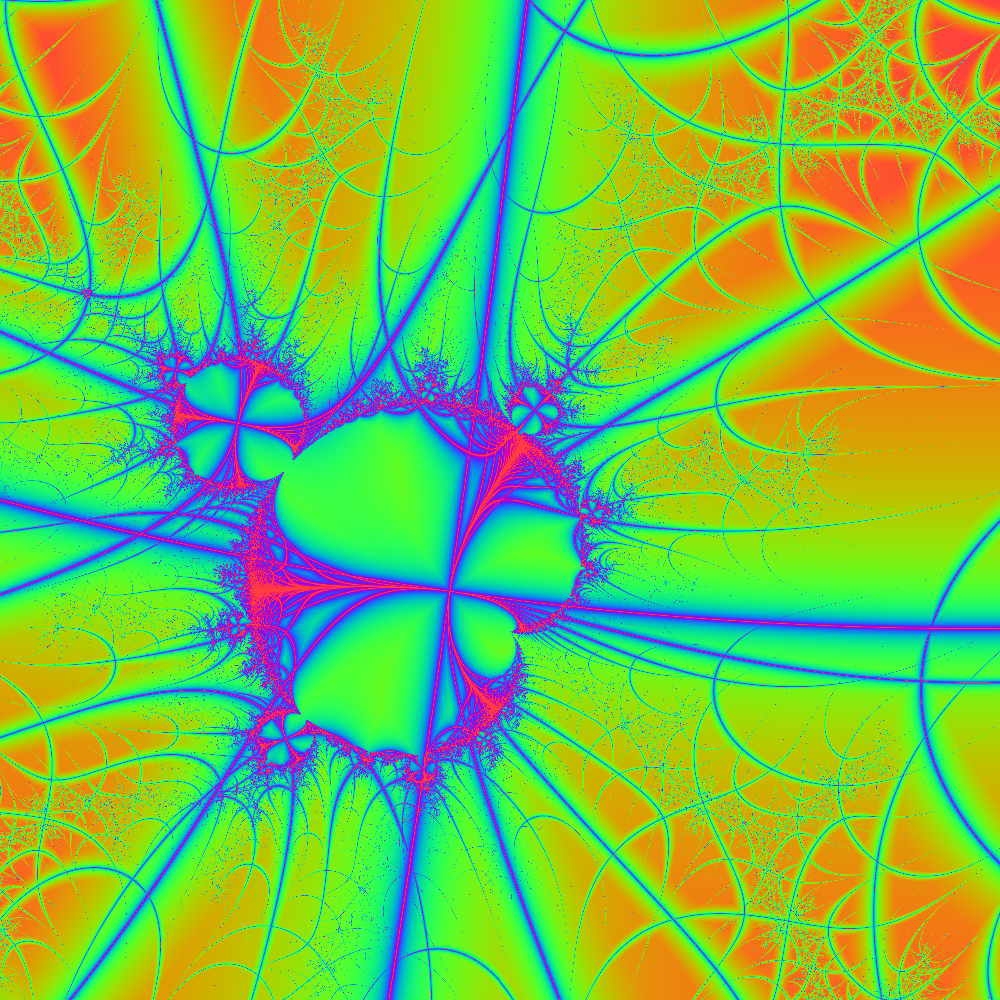
Example of Pickover stalks in a detail of the Mandelbrot set

Pickover stalks are certain kinds of details to be found empirically in the Mandelbrot set, in the study of fractal geometry. They are so named after the researcher Clifford Pickover, whose "epsilon cross" method was instrumental in their discovery. An "epsilon cross" is a cross-shaped orbit trap.

According to Vepstas (1997) "Pickover hit on the novel concept of looking to see how closely the orbits of interior points come to the x and y axes. In these pictures, the closer that the point approaches, the higher up the color scale, with red denoting the closest approach. The logarithm of the distance is taken to accentuate the details".

== Biomorphs ==
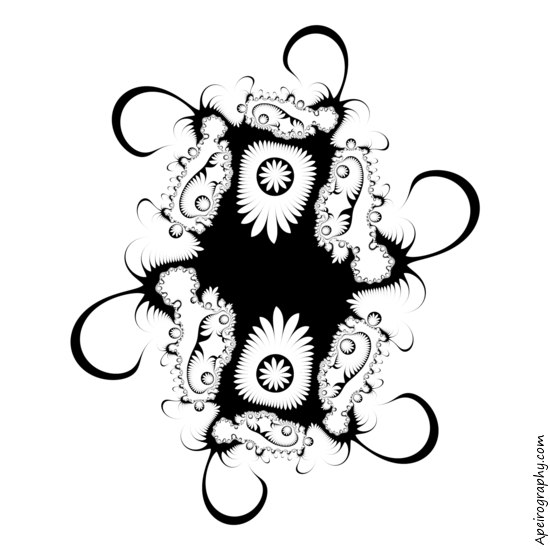
An example of the sort of biomorphic forms yielded by Pickover's algorithm.

Biomorphs are biological-looking Pickover Stalks. At the end of the 1980s, Pickover developed biological feedback organisms similar to Julia sets and the fractal Mandelbrot set. According to Pickover (1999) in summary, he "described an algorithm that can be used for the creation of diverse and complicated forms resembling invertebrate organisms. The shapes are complicated and difficult to predict before actually experimenting with the mappings." He hoped "these techniques will encourage [others] to explore further and discover new forms, by accident, that are on the edge of science and art".

Pickover developed an algorithm (which uses neither random perturbations nor natural laws) to create very complicated forms resembling invertebrate organisms. The iteration, or recursion, of mathematical transformations is used to generate biological morphologies. He called them "biomorphs." At the same time he coined "biomorph" for these patterns, the famous evolutionary biologist Richard Dawkins used the word to refer to his own set of biological shapes that were arrived at by a very different procedure. More rigorously, Pickover's "biomorphs" encompass the class of organismic morphologies created by small changes to traditional convergence tests in the field of "Julia set" theory.

Pickover's biomorphs show a self-similarity at different scales, a common feature of dynamical systems with feedback. Real systems, such as shorelines and mountain ranges, also show self-similarity over some scales. A 2-dimensional parametric 0L system can “look” like Pickover's biomorphs.

== Implementation ==
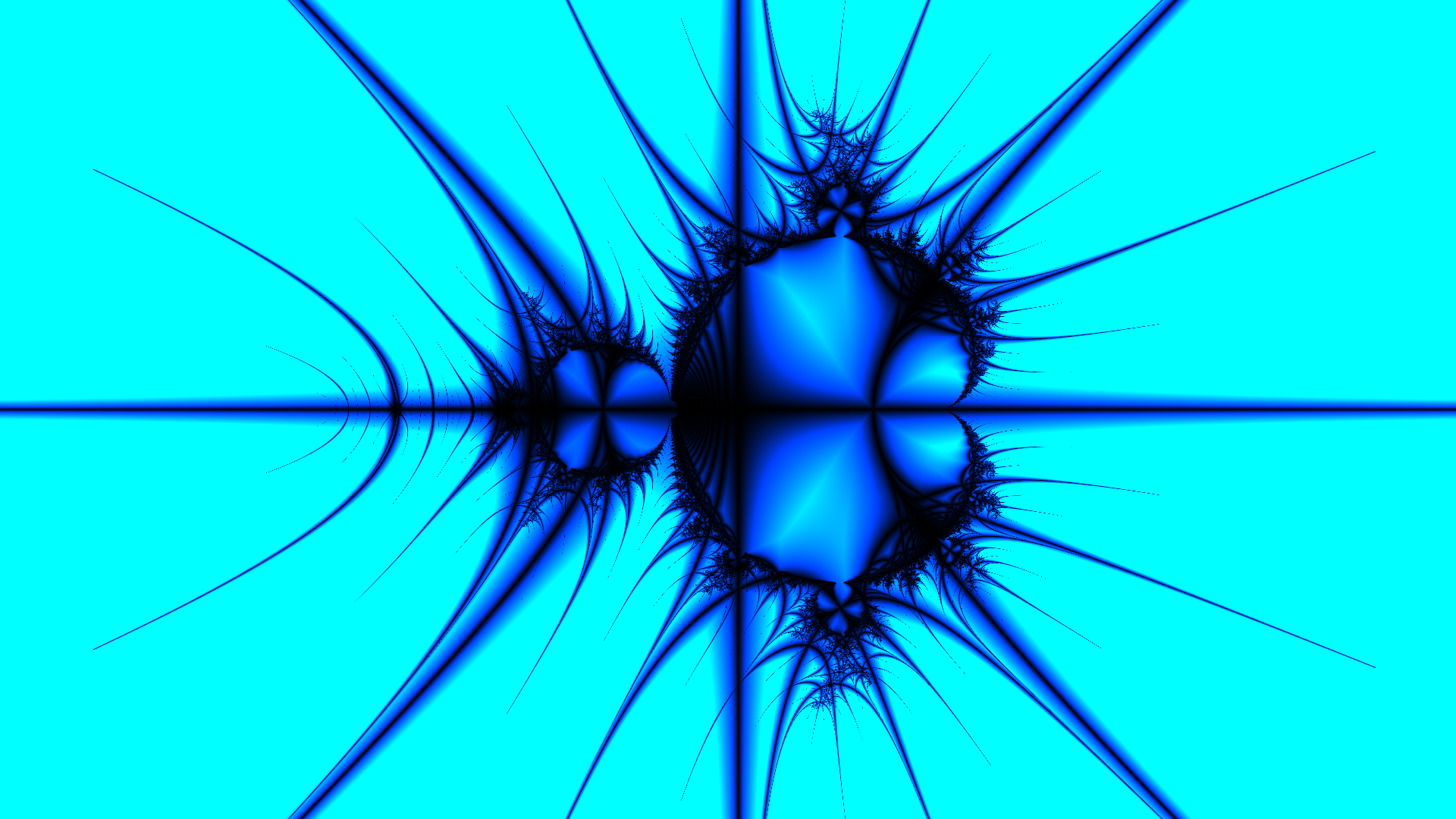
Pickover Stalk rendered with an implementation of the given pseudocode.

The below example, written in pseudocode, renders a Mandelbrot set colored using a Pickover Stalk with a transformation vector and a color dividend.

The transformation vector is used to offset the (x, y) position when sampling the point's distance to the horizontal and vertical axis.

The color dividend is a float used to determine how thick the stalk is when it is rendered.

For each pixel (x, y) on the target, do:
{
	zx = scaled x coordinate of pixel (scaled to lie in the Mandelbrot X scale (-2.5, 1))
    zy = scaled y coordinate of pixel (scaled to lie in the Mandelbrot Y scale (-1, 1))
	float2 c = (zx, zy) //Offset in the Mandelbrot formulae
	
	float x = zx; //Coordinates to be iterated
	float y = zy;
	
	float trapDistance = 1000000; //Keeps track of distance, set to a high value at first.

    int iteration = 0;
	while (x*x + y*y < 4 && iteration < maxIterations)
	{	
		float2 z = float2(x, y);

		z = cmul(z, z); // z^2, cmul is a multiplication function for complex numbers
	    z += c;					

		x = z.x;
		y = z.y;

		float distanceToX = abs(z.x + transformationVector.x); //Checks the distance to the vertical axis
		float distanceToY = abs(z.y + transformationVector.y); //Checks the distance to the horizontal axis

		smallestDistance = min(distanceToX, distanceToY); // Use only smaller axis distance
		trapDistance = min(trapDistance, smallestDistance);

		iteration++;
	}
	return trapDistance * color / dividend; 
	//Dividend is an external float, the higher it is the thicker the stalk is
}
