= Muscovite (disambiguation) =

Muscovite is a mineral.

Muscovite may also refer to:

- A demonym for an inhabitant of the city of Moscow
- An old foreign name for Russians who inhabited the Grand Principality of Moscow (1263–1478 or 1547) or the Tsardom of Russia (1547–1721)

== See also ==
- Muscovy (disambiguation)
- Moskvitch (disambiguation)
- Moskal, a historical designation used for residents of the Grand Duchy of Moscow and Russia; currently an ethnic slur
- Moscovium, chemical element 115
