= Leonardo Pereznieto =

Mexican artist, sculptor, and painter (born 1969)

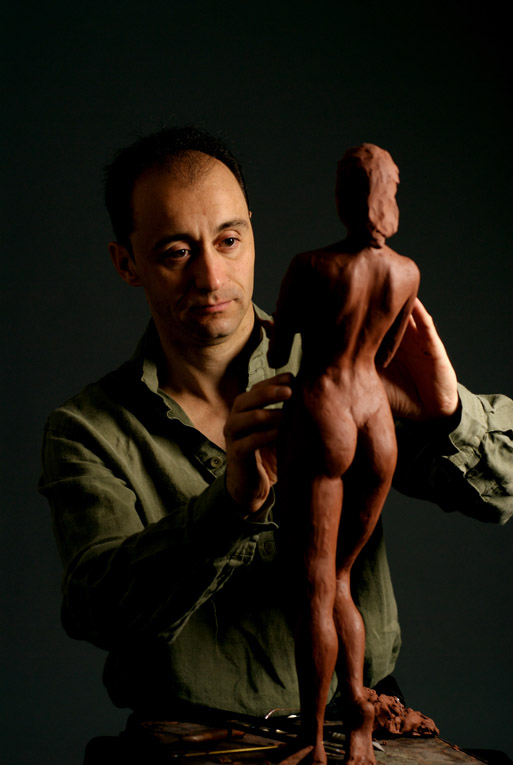
Leonardo Pereznieto

Leonardo Pereznieto (born 1969) is a Mexican artist, sculptor, and painter. Pereznieto has studied in Mexico, Italy and the United States and has mastered engraving, serigraphy, watercolor, pastel and oil painting, and marble, bronze and resin sculpture.

He has had exhibitions in galleries in Paris, London, Florence, Frankfurt, New York City, Los Angeles, and Monaco among others and has received the Italy Award for Visual Arts, the Premio Firenze, the award at the International Art Festival in New York City, the Mozart Prize in Nice, France and the Bell´Art Award in Portugal, etc. He has worked as a set-design painter in Hollywood. He is a graduate of administration from the International Training Organization of California and a graduate of Executive Administration from the Flag Service Organization of Florida.

Pereznieto has delivered over 50 lectures around the globe, including at the NY Academy of Art, University of Michigan the Tecnologico de Monterrey and the Celebrity Centre Florence. He is the Director of Visual Arts of Artists for Human Rights Mexico.

Leonardo is the son of painter and sculptor Fernando Pereznieto. He studied art with his father at an early age and began watercolor painting before learning to speak and walk. His first exhibition was at the age of 8 in the Gallery of Goya, Mexico City.

== Gallery ==
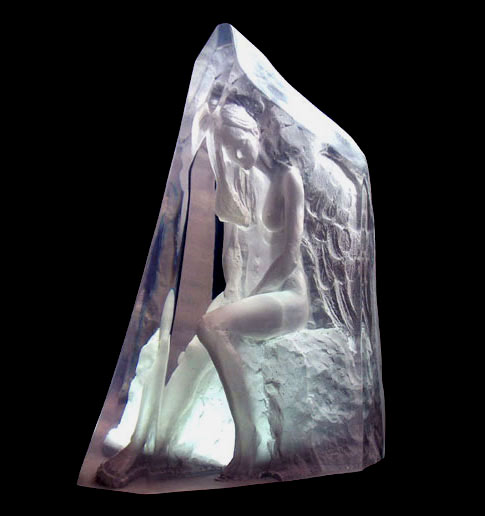
Guardian Angel

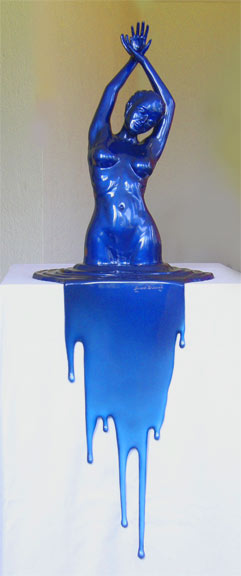
Fountain of Life
