= Kazimierz Moskal =

Kazimierz Moskal may refer to:

- Kazimierz Moskal (footballer) (born 1967), Polish footballer
- Kazimierz Moskal (politician) (born 1962), Polish politician
