= Moskvitch (disambiguation) =

Moskvitch is a Soviet automobile brand produced by the AZLK (former MZMA) plant.

Moskvitch may also refer to:

- Moskvitch (Bulgaria), Bulgarian-made motor cars based on Soviet Moskvitches, built at the "Balkan" factory
- Moskvitch-class motorship, a series of Soviet short-range passenger river ships
