= XaoS =

Interactive fractal zoomer program

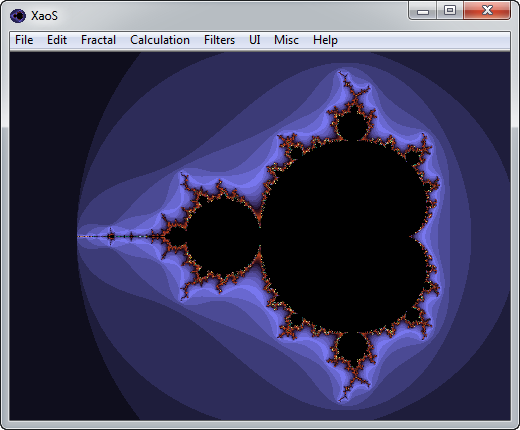
- Original authors: Jan Hubička, Thomas Marsh
- Developer: XaoS Contributors
- Stable release: 4.3.7 / July 26, 2026; 0 days ago
- Written in: C, C++
- Operating system: Cross-platform
- Available in: 19 languages
- List of languages Armenian, Chinese, Czech, English, French, German, Hebrew, Hindi, Hungarian, Icelandic, Italian, Portuguese, Romanian, Russian, Serbian, Spanish, Swedish, Turkish, Vietnamese
- Type: Fractal generating software
- License: GPL
- Website: xaos-project.github.io
- Repository: github.com/xaos-project/XaoS

XaoS is an interactive fractal zoomer program. It allows the user to continuously zoom in or out of a fractal in real-time.

XaoS is licensed under GPL. The program is cross-platform, and is available for a variety of operating systems, including Linux, Windows, Mac OS X, BeOS and others. Recently an offline web version of XaoS became available, being published at xaos.app.

XaoS can show the Mandelbrot set (power 2, 3, 4, 5 and 6), the Octo fractal, three types of Barnsley's fractals, the Newton fractal (order 3 and 4), Phoenix fractal and Magnet (1 and 2). XaoS can display Julia sets from selected fractal parts. Xaos also allows users to enter custom formulas.

Earlier versions of XaoS are capable of displaying fractals as ASCII art using AAlib, which, in combination with being built on freely available GNU tools, allows it to run almost anywhere. Newer versions use the cross-platform Qt library.

An interactive help and an animated introduction to fractals are included. The introduction deals in ten chapters with different formulas presented in the software and their features.

== Hubička algorithm ==
XaoS was originally just a "poorly written" Mandelbrot viewer, until Jan Hubička added efficient zooming, using a technique sometimes called the XaoS algorithm or Hubička algorithm.

At that time, fractal zoom movies were produced by completely recalculating each frame, even though they naturally had much of their area in common with each other. This made interactive zooming impossible without very powerful computers. Furthermore, unless even more processing is used in order to do antialiasing, recalculating every frame produces a 'twinkle' effect as small bright areas hit and then disappear between pixels.

Yet allowing the user to zoom, rather than jump as in Fractint, seemed like the most natural way to interact with fractals. In order to create an interactive zoom, Hubička needed to find a way to save the calculations which were already made. It would take up too much memory to save every pixel ever calculated, so the Hubička algorithm only saves the previous frame, and rather than remembering the location of each pixel it can keep them aligned in rows and columns and remember those instead.

The most difficult part of the XaoS algorithm was choosing which saved rows and columns to draw where. Doing this wrong results in distorted images, yet it must be done quickly to be useful. After several different heuristics were tried, eventually the problem was treated as an optimization problem.

The remaining rows and columns are colored in the same as the closest row/column, and are freshly calculated as the CPU gets time to do so. This is a careful balance between keeping the zoom going and increasing the level of detail. Calculating areas where the image is being zoomed to is put at a higher priority since these will be on the screen the longest and this is likely where the user is looking anyway. Zooming out, the reverse occurs, and the priority is on the edges.

The Hubička algorithm can also be applied to zooming in on other images where the pixels are calculated, and has been used in other software such as the rtzme ("Real-Time Zooming Math Engine") complex function graphing program, and other fractal zoomers.
