= Sterling (program) =

Fractal-generating computer program

Sterling2
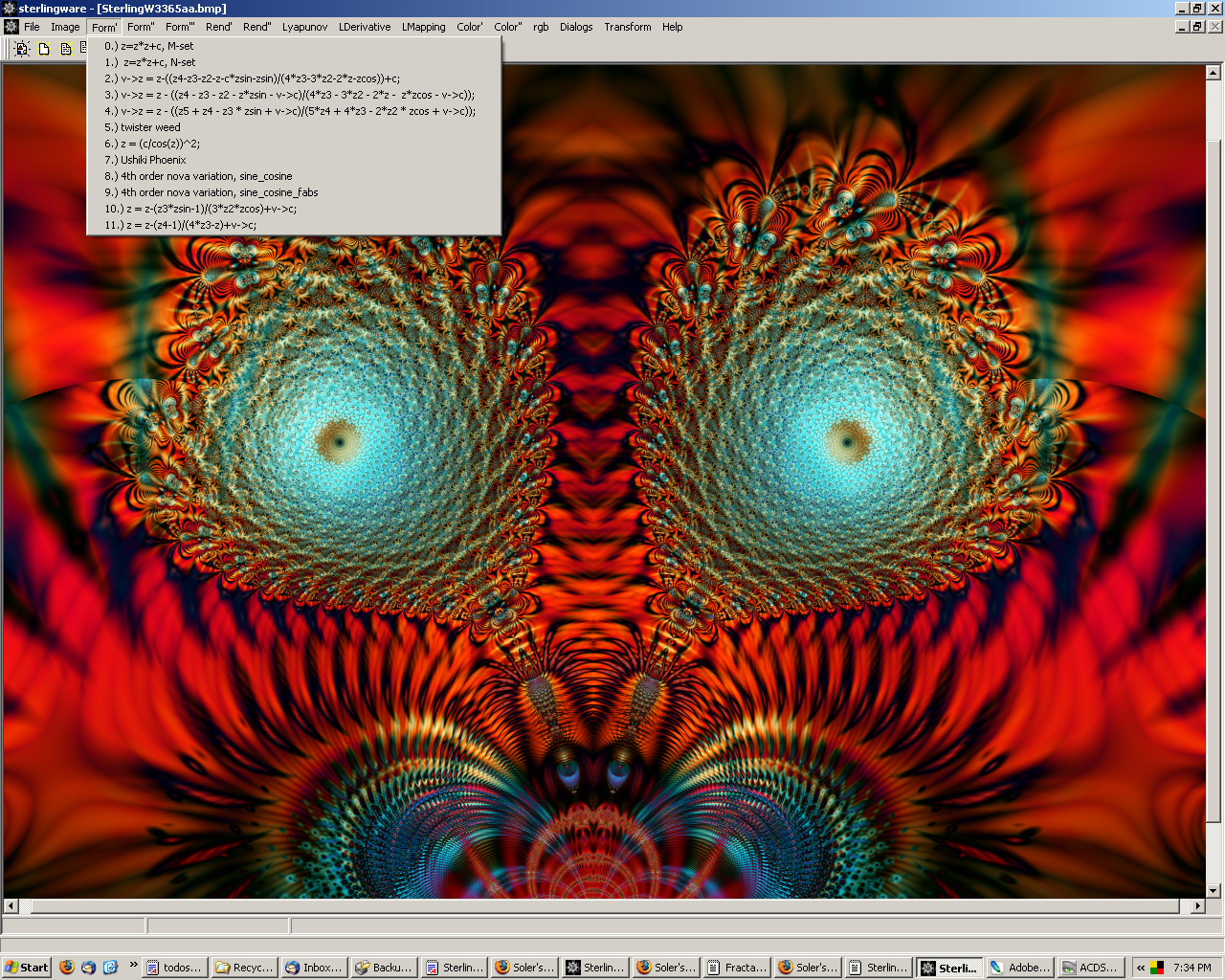
- sin(z) log(z) − tan(z))/(z^{2} cos(z) − 2z) · c
- Stable release: v1.7 / September 2008; 17 years ago
- Written in: C
- Operating system: Microsoft Windows
- Type: Fractal-generating software
- License: GPLv3
- Website: soler7.com/Fractals/Sterling2.html

Sterling is a fractal-generating computer program written in the C programming language in 1999 for Microsoft Windows by Stephen C. Ferguson. Sterling is now freeware while Sterling2 is a freeware version of Sterling with different algorithms. It was released in September 2008 by Tad Boniecki. Apart from the name (which shows as sterlingwar2 in the title bar and on the About screen), the program looks just like the original Sterling. The only internals that are different are the 50 formulae for fractal generation. Parameter files made by Sterling can be used in Sterling2 and vice versa, though they will draw different images.

Sterling is based on the notion that one way to generate interesting fractal images is by using elaborate color filters and shading. In many images, the main interest lies in the filters rather than the actual fractal boundaries themselves, as in traditional fractal-generating programs. The fractal merely serves as a seeding function to the coloring algorithms and filters. A feature of Sterling is the richness of the renders.

Sterling has a simple GUI interface with a limited number of functions. The program saves files as JPEG, BMP or one of six other formats. It draws in Julia mode, allows inside-out rendering and does anti-aliasing. It offers 32 different renders and four transform effects. There are three independent color controls and two ways to zoom into an image.

The Sterling2 ZIP file (436 KB) contains brief instructions. There is no installation — it is enough to put the executable and dynamic-link library files in the same directory and start the exe file.

== Sample images ==
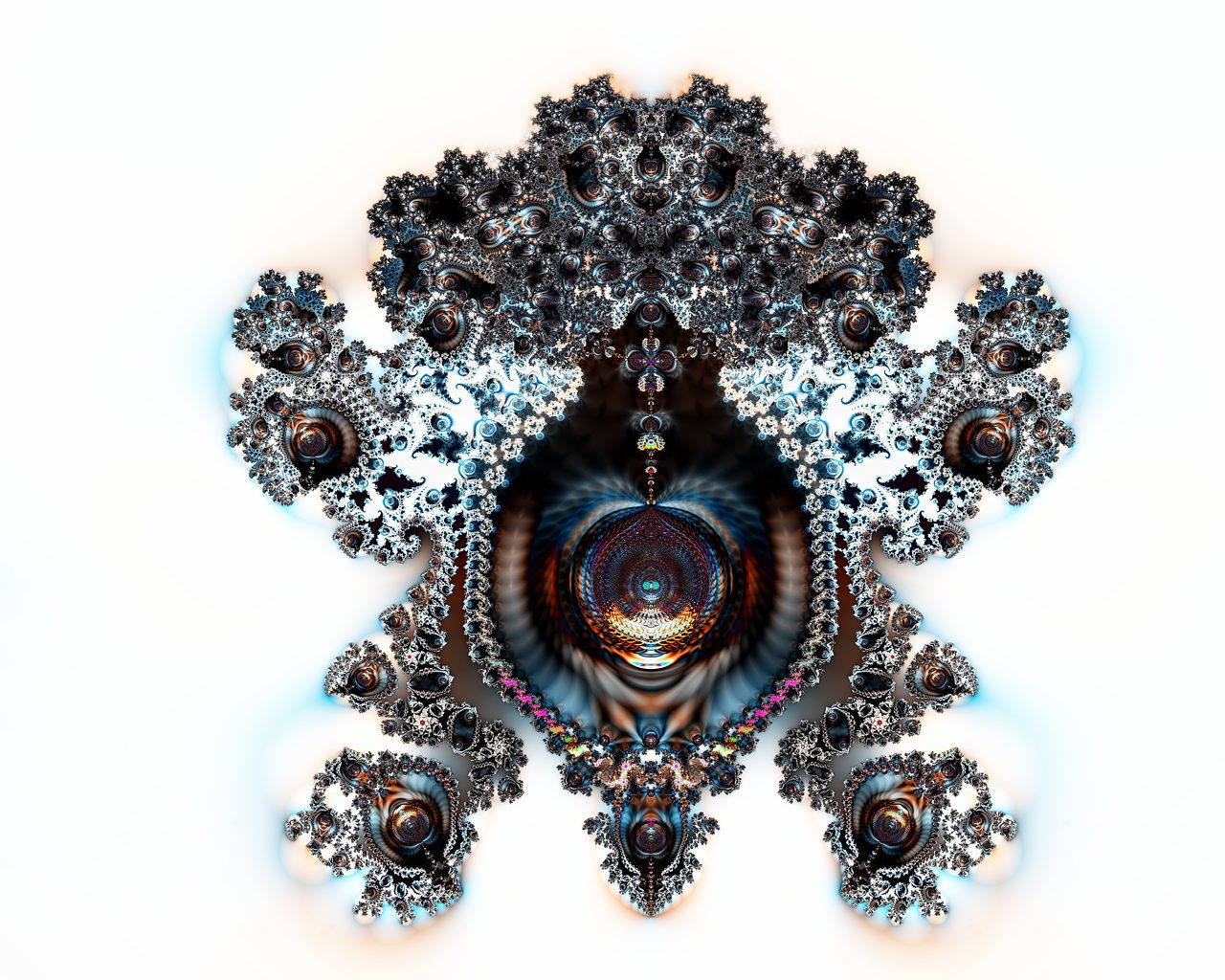

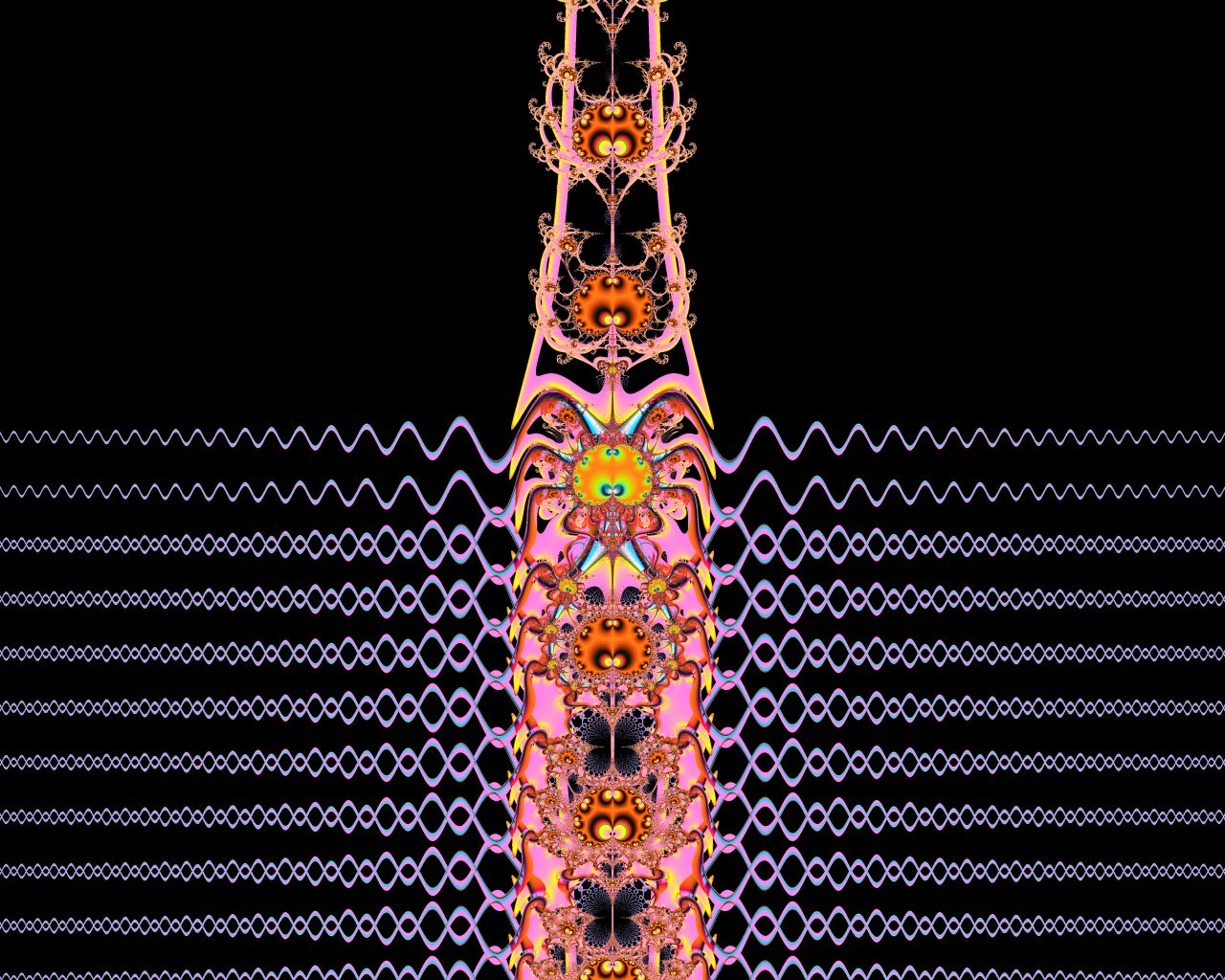

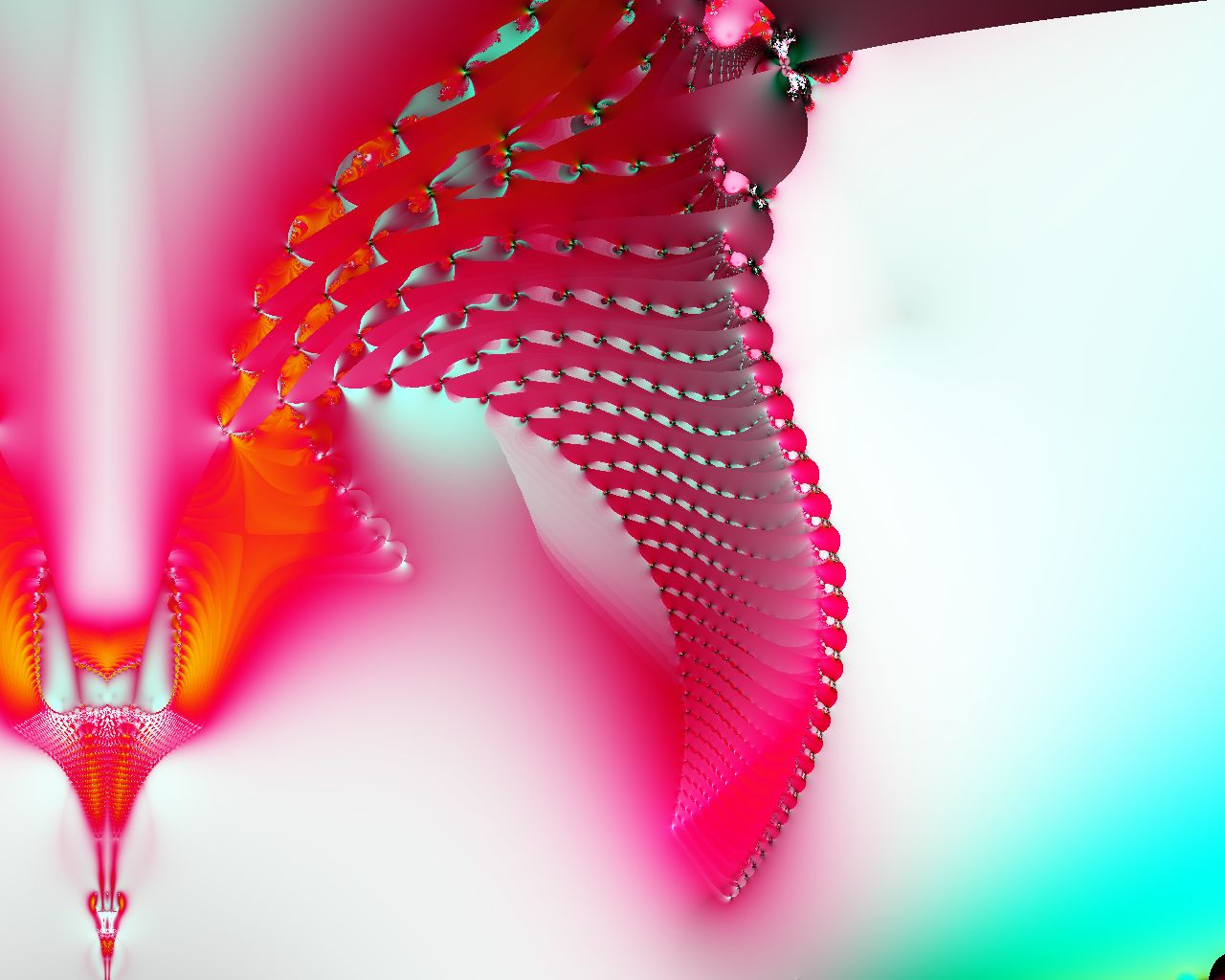

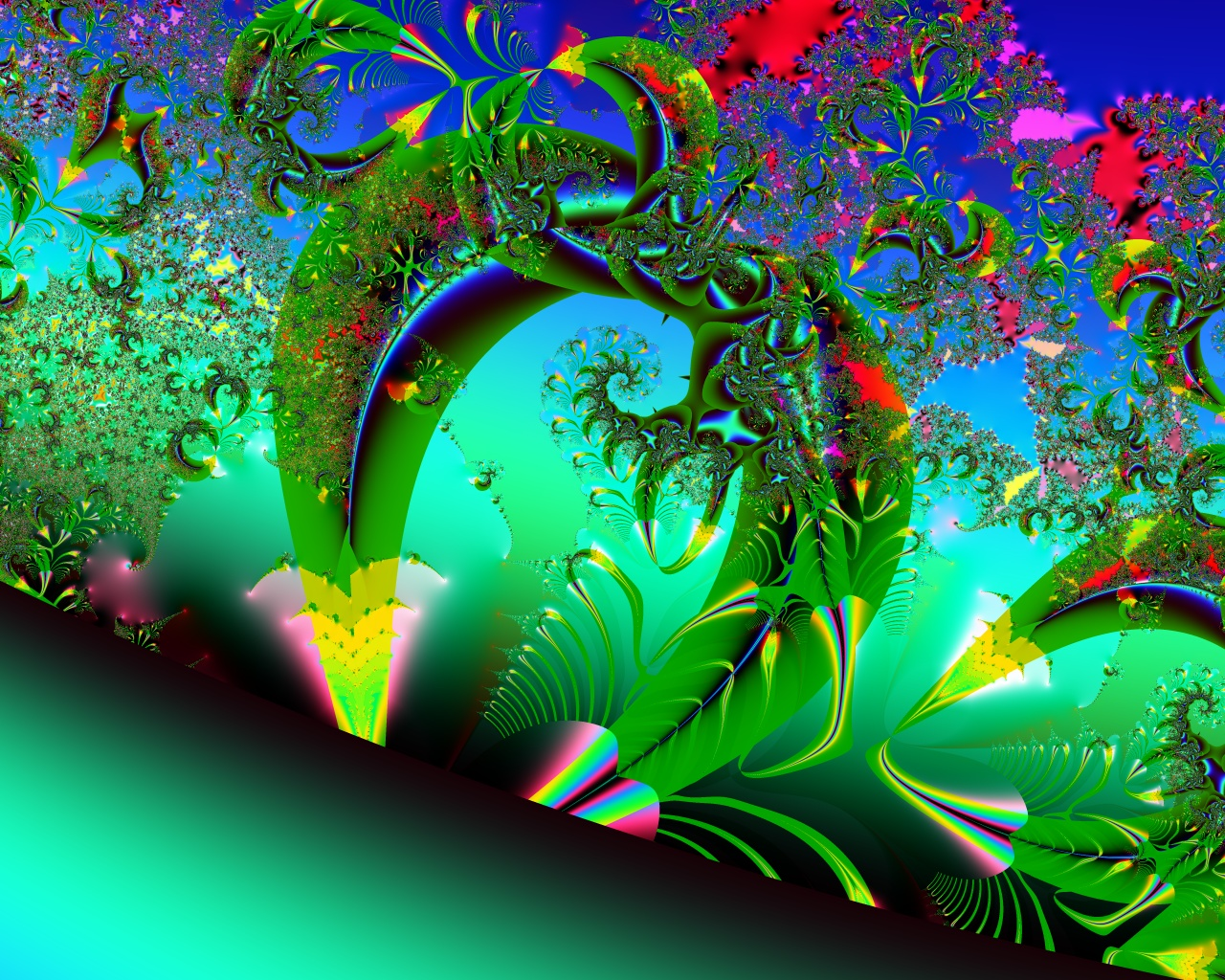

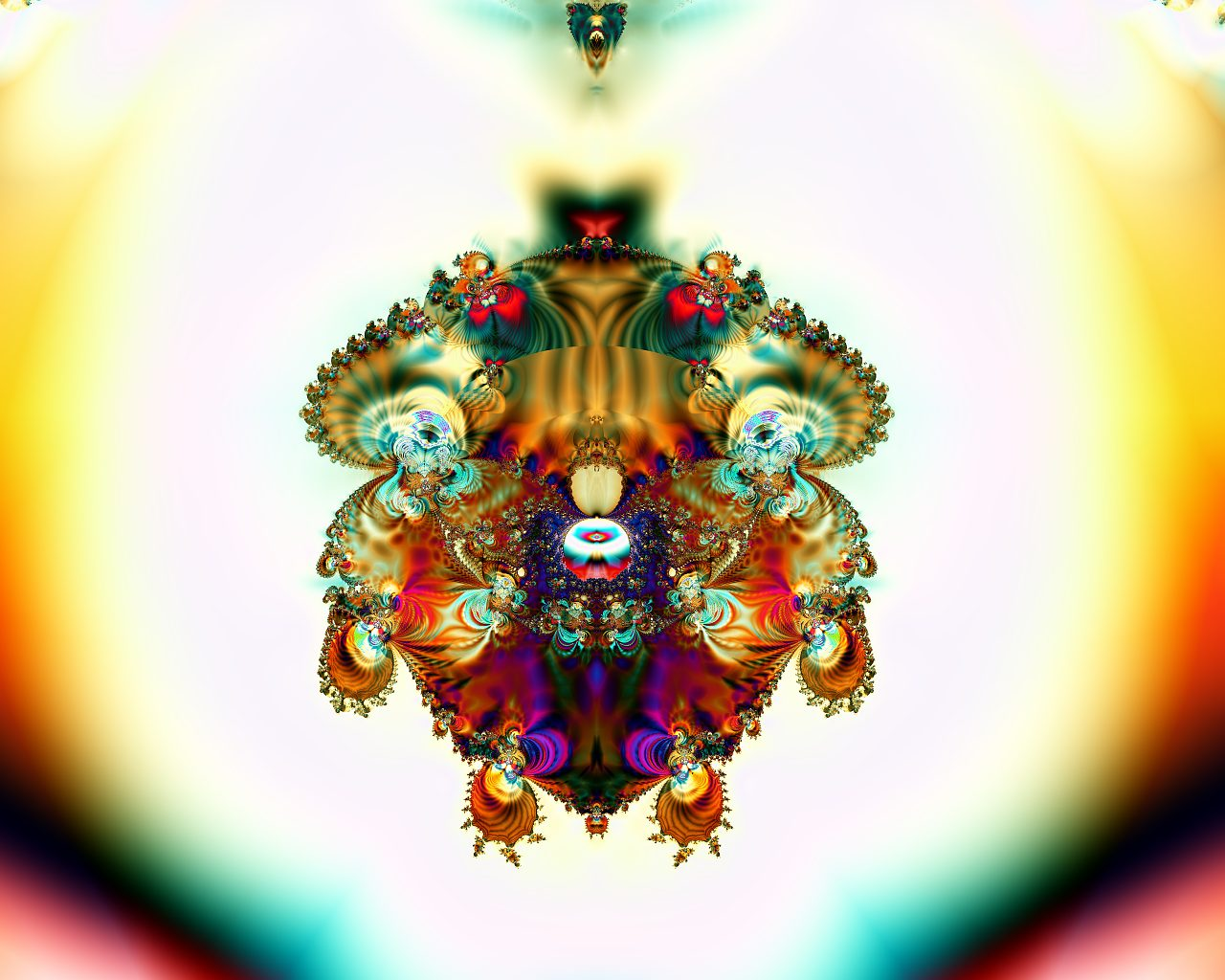

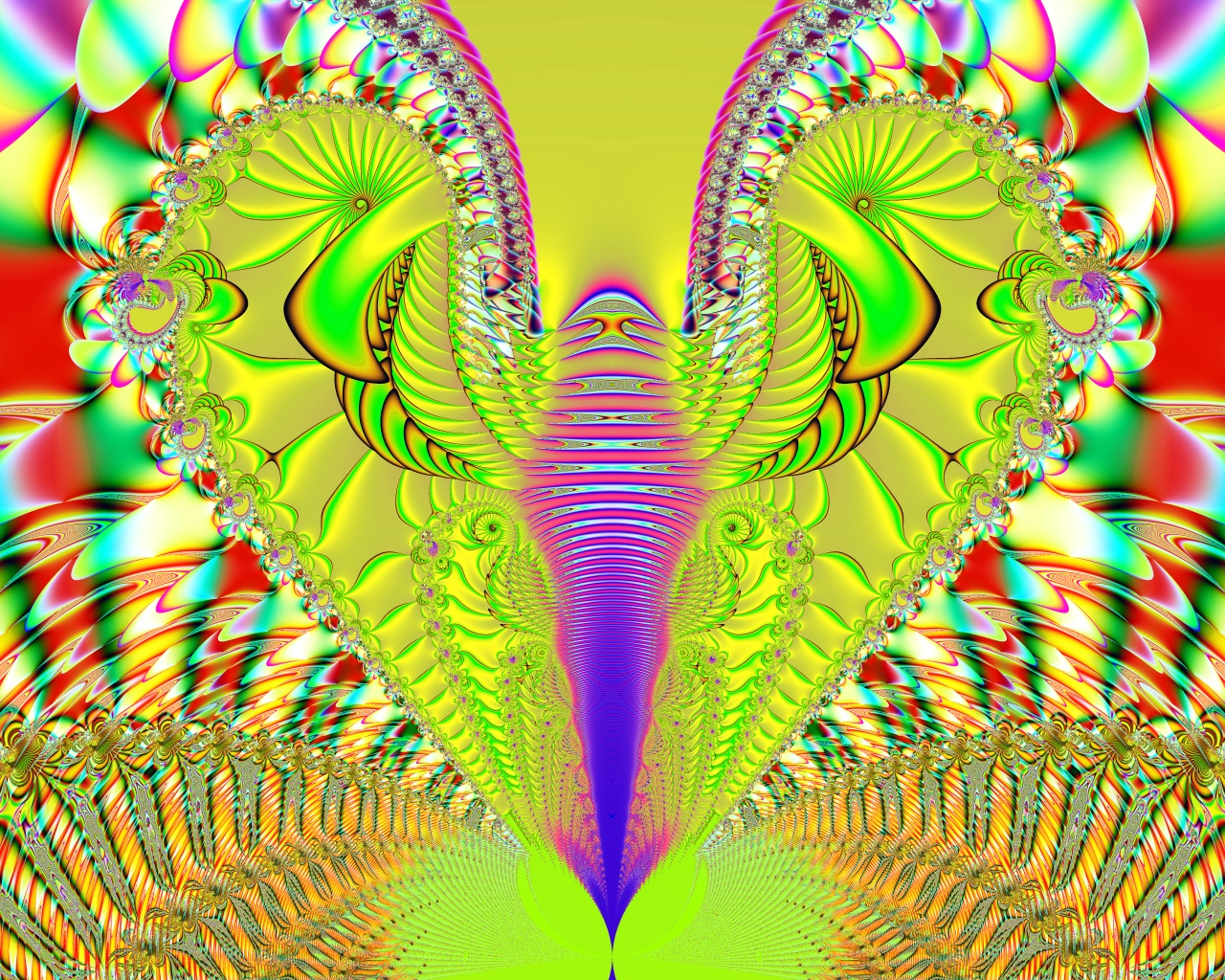
