= Fyre (software) =

Cross-platform tool for producing artwork

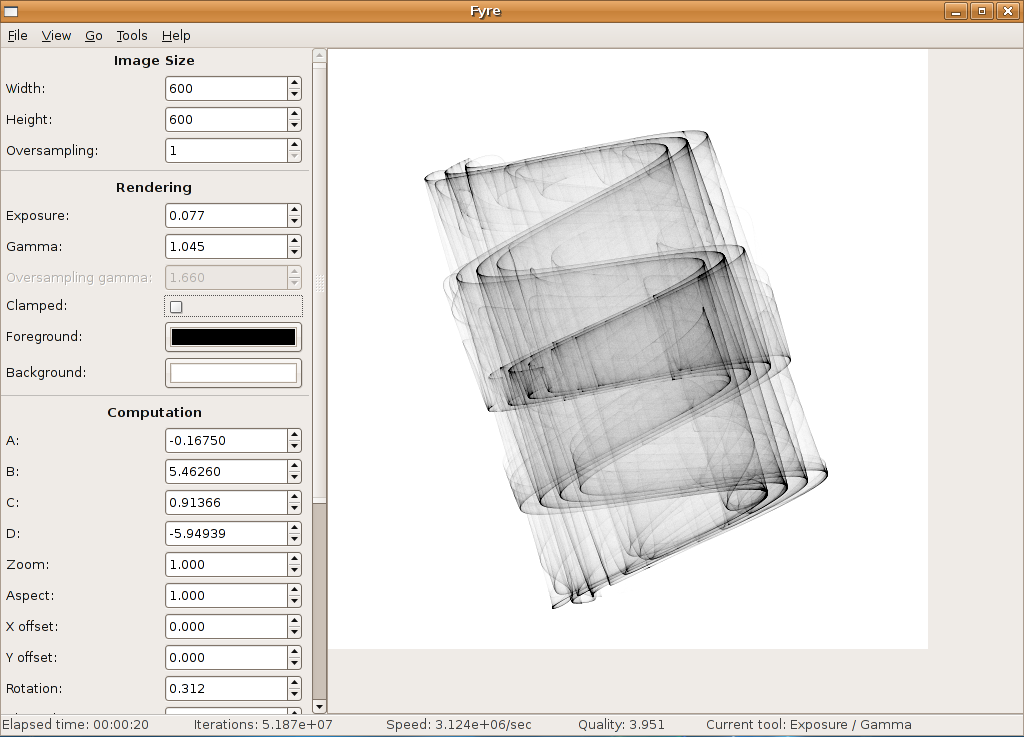
- A screenshot of Fyre 1.0
- Original authors: David Trowbridge and Micah Elizabeth Scott
- Stable release: 1.0.1 / October 9, 2006; 19 years ago
- Preview release: 2.0
- Operating system: Cross-platform
- Available in: English
- License: GPL

Fyre, formerly de Jong Explorer, is a cross-platform tool for producing artwork based on histograms of iterated chaotic functions. It implements the Peter de Jong map in a fixed function pipeline through either a GTK GUI frontend, or a command line facility for easier rendering of high-resolution, high quality images. The program was renamed from de Jong Explorer to Fyre simply because 'It wasn't taken yet' and so that in the future, it could support more functions than just the standard Peter de Jong map. Fyre features a sidebar on the left to which the user can input the required variables and on the right is displayed the result of the equation.

== Extra features ==
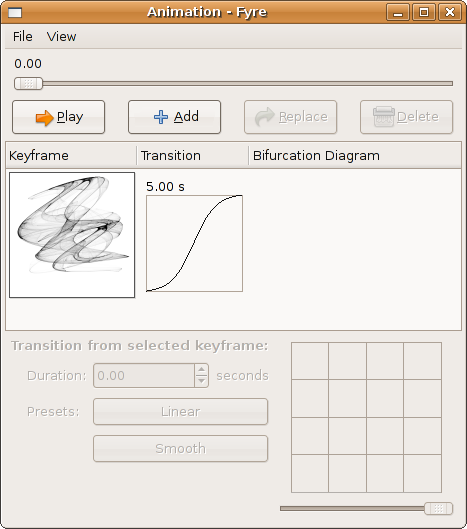
Fyre's Animation Window

- Additional image manipulation tools such as Gaussian blurs and Gamma controls are included in the program. The advantage to using them directly within Fyre is that the image accuracy and quality do not decline.
- Fyre features animation capabilities so that a user can link together several maps and create uncompressed AVIs from them. However, the uncompressed animation files are very large and so should be compressed with a separate tool, such as mencoder.

[citation needed]

== Peter de Jong Map ==
$$\begin{align}x_{n+1} &= \sin(ay_n) - \cos(bx_n)\\
y_{n+1} &= \sin(cx_n) - \cos(dy_n)\end{align}$$

For most values of a,b,c and d the point (x,y) moves chaotically. The resulting image is a map of the probability that the point lies within the area represented by each pixel. Therefore, the longer that the user lets Fyre render for, the larger the probability map becomes and the more accurate the resulting image.
