= Fractint =

Computer program to render and display many kinds of fractals

- The Mandelbrot set rendered in Fractint
- Developer: Stone Soup Group
- Initial release: September 1988; 37 years ago
- Stable release: 20.4.17 / April 14, 2022; 4 years ago
- Operating system: MS-DOS, Linux
- Available in: English
- Type: Fractal generating software
- License: Freeware
- Website: fractint.org

Fractint (originally FRACT386) is a freeware computer program to render and display many kinds of fractals. The program originated on MS-DOS, then was ported to the Atari ST, Linux, and Macintosh. During the early 1990s, Fractint was the definitive fractal generating program for personal computers.

The name is a portmanteau of fractal and integer, since the first versions of Fractint used only integer arithmetic (also known as fixed-point arithmetic), for faster rendering on computers without math coprocessors. Since then, floating-point arithmetic and arbitrary-precision arithmetic modes have been added.

FractInt can draw most kinds of fractals that have appeared in the literature. It also has a few "fractal types" that are not strictly speaking fractals, but may be more accurately described as display hacks. These include cellular automata.

== Development ==
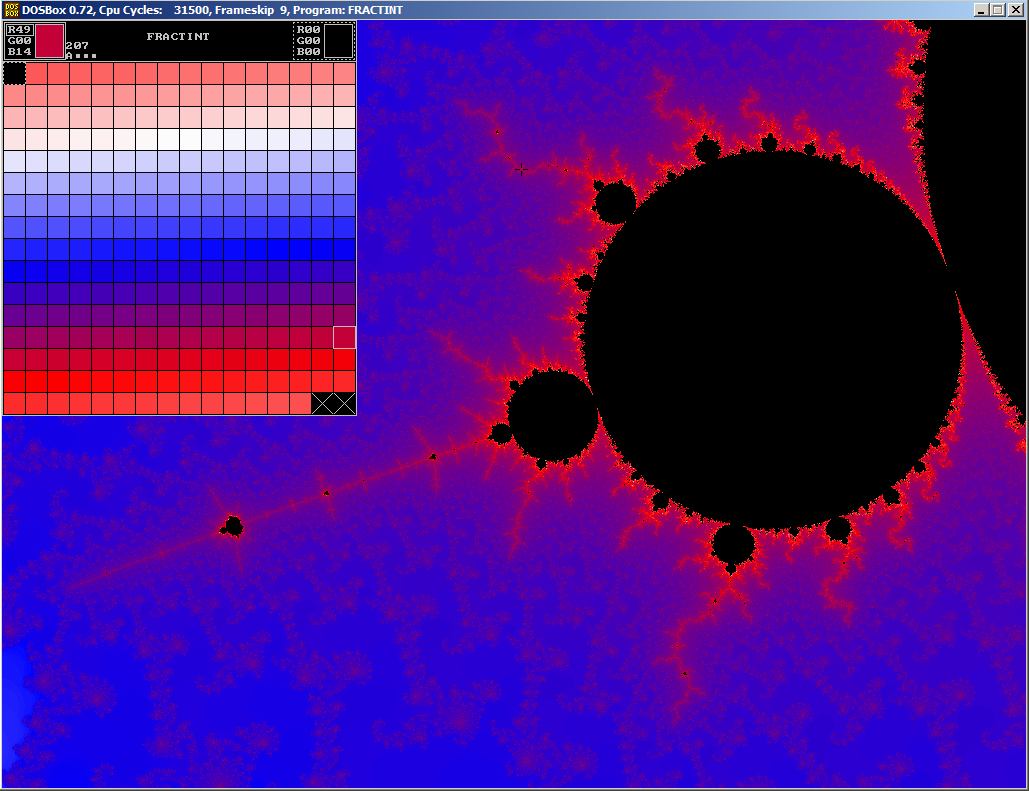
A Mandelbrot fractal with Fractint's colour palette editor (version 20.0 in DOSBOX 0.72)

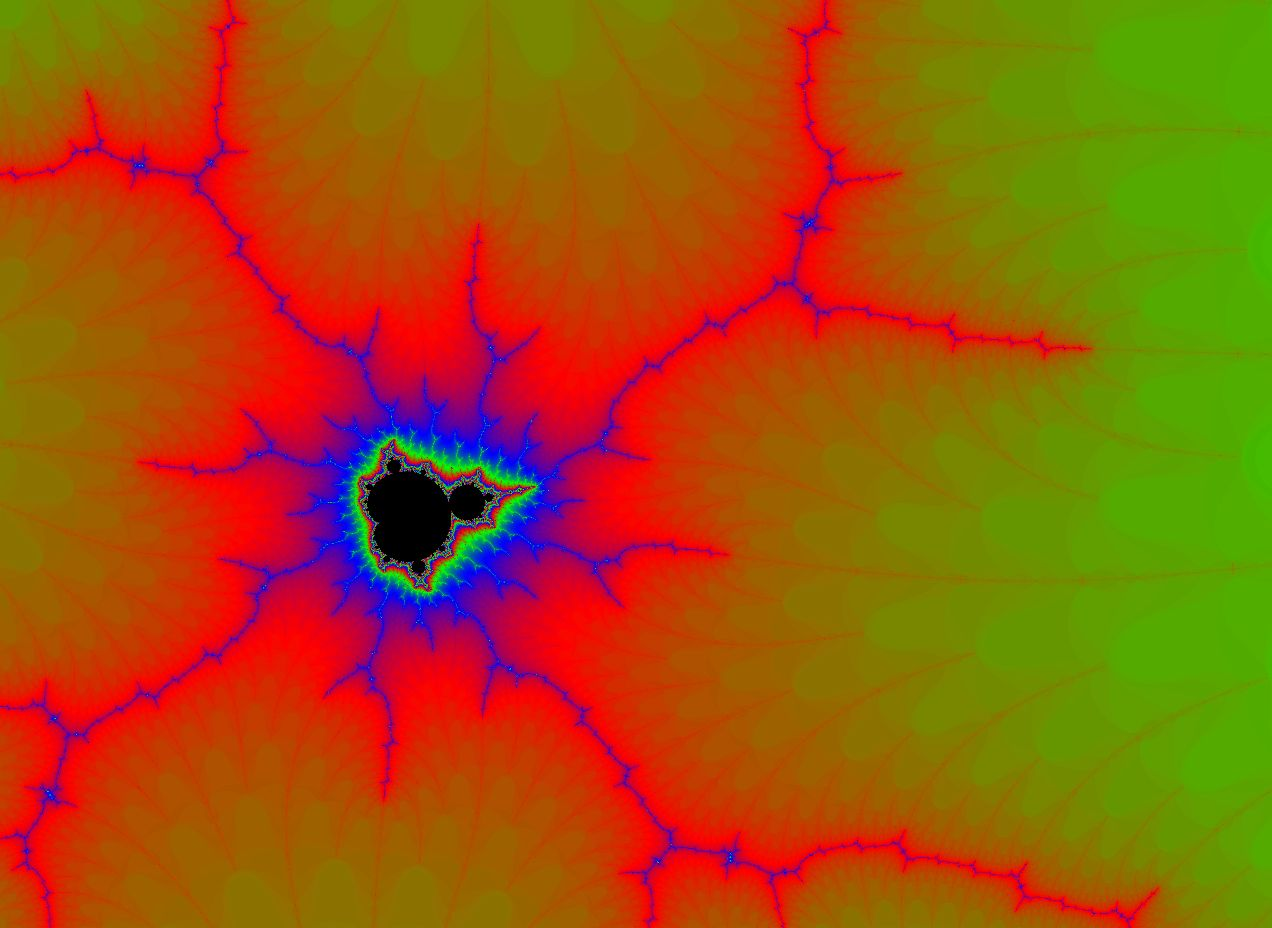
One portion of the Mandelbrot set at extreme magnification, showing how the set contains near copies of itself

Fractint originally appeared in 1988 as FRACT386, a computer program for rendering fractals very quickly on the Intel 80386 processor using integer arithmetic. The 80386 requires the Intel 80387 coprocessor to natively support floating point math, which was rare in IBM PC compatibles.

Early versions of FRACT386 were written by Bert Tyler, who based it on a Mandelbrot generator for a TI-based processor that used integer math and decided to try programming something similar for his 386 machine.

In February 1989, the program was renamed Fractint. In July 1990, it was ported to the Atari ST, with the math routines rewritten in Motorola 68000 assembly language by Howard Chu.

== Forks ==
There are two notable forks of FRACTINT: ManPWin and Iterated Dynamics. ManPWin is a fork based on WinFract 18 with source code on github. Iterated Dynamics is a fork based on FRACTINT 20.04 patch level 4, with source code on github.

== See also ==
- Fractal art
- Fractal-generating software
