= List of people with paraplegia =

Paraplegia is an impairment in motor or sensory function of the lower extremities. The word comes from Ionic Greek (παραπληγίη) "half-stricken". It is usually caused by spinal cord injury or a congenital condition that affects the neural (brain) elements of the spinal canal. The area of the spinal canal that is affected in paraplegia is either the thoracic, lumbar, or sacral regions. If four limbs are affected by paralysis, tetraplegia or quadriplegia is the correct term. If only one limb is affected, the correct term is monoplegia. Spastic paraplegia is a form of paraplegia defined by spasticity of the affected muscles, rather than flaccid paralysis.

== Notable people with paraplegia ==
- Greg Abbott, Governor of Texas; former Texas Attorney General (paraplegic due to a 1984 freak accident when a falling oak tree hit him in the back)
- Peter Berry, American wheelchair basketball player for Alabama Crimson Tide
- Edward Stinson Brown, Jr. (1920-2005), atomic weapons maintenance specialist at Sandia Base, injured in combat in World War II.
- Paul Darke, British academic and disability rights activist born with spina bifida.
- Deng Pufang, Chinese politician, son of Deng Xiaoping
- HolLynn D'Lil (1945–2022), American disability rights activist and photographer
- John Porter East (1931–1986), US politician who was partially paralyzed by polio in 1955
- Frank Gardner (journalist) (born 1961), prominent BBC journalist who became paralysed after being shot six times at close range by an Al-Qaeda gunman in Saudi Arabia
- Chuck Graham (1965–2020), United States politician injured in an automobile accident at age 16
- Tanni Grey-Thompson, paralympian born with spina bifida
- Rick Hansen, Canadian Paralympian who was paralyzed in a car crash at age 15
- John Hockenberry (born 1956), journalist and blogger
- Paul Johnson (producer) (1971–2021), American record producer and disc jockey who was shot accidentally
- Sharry Konopski (1967–2017), model and actress injured in a car accident
- Charles Krauthammer (1950–2018), conservative columnist and commentator
- Boris Kustodiev (1878–1927), Russian painter who became paraplegic due to tuberculosis of the vertebral column.
- James Langevin, US Congressman from Rhode Island who was shot accidentally at age 16.
- Linda Laubenstein (1947–1992), American physician who was left paraplegic after a childhood polio infection
- Craig Hart Neilsen (1941–2006), American gaming executive who founded Ameristar Casinos, Inc. and formed the Craig H. Neilsen Foundation to fund scientific research and quality-of-life programs for people living with spinal cord injuries.
- Nicole Niquille, Swiss mountaineer, mountain guide and humanitarian for Nepalese women's health.
- Ajith C. S. Perera (1956–2020), a Sri Lankan disability rights activist and former cricket umpire, who was paralyzed when a tree fell onto his moving car.
- Franklin D. Roosevelt (1882–1945), former president of the United States who, at the age of 39, was partially paralyzed by polio
- Wolfgang Schäuble, German politician injured in an assassination attempt in 1990
- Iyad Shalabi (born 1987), Israeli Paralympic champion wimmer
- Liesl Tesch (born 1969), an Australian wheelchair basketball player.
- George Corley Wallace, governor of Alabama and former candidate for the Democratic presidential nomination
- Colt Wynn, American bodybuilding champion
- Zhang Haidi, Chinese woman writer and translator, president of the China Disabled Persons' Federation (2008-).
- Aamish (Varun Khullar), Indian DJ and music producer, known as India’s first differently-abled DJ.

== See also ==
- List of cases of Bell's palsy
- List of people with quadriplegia
