= List of people with tetraplegia =

Tetraplegia, also known as quadriplegia, is paralysis caused by illness or injury that results in the partial or total loss of use of all four limbs and torso; paraplegia is similar but does not affect the arms. The loss is usually sensory and motor, which means that both sensation and control are lost. The paralysis may be flaccid or spastic.

== Notable people with tetraplegia ==
- Anne-Marie Alonzo (1951–2005) – Canadian writer and publisher; in 1966 she was the victim of a car accident which left her quadriplegic and using a wheelchair.
- Max Brito (1971–2022) – Ivoirian international rugby union player; paralyzed in a match against Tonga in the 1995 Rugby World Cup.
- John Callahan (1951–2010) – Cartoonist, became a quadriplegic in an auto accident at age 21
- Walter Harris Callow (1896–1958) – inventor of the wheelchair accessible bus.
- Roy Campanella (1921–1993) – American baseball player. Paralyzed in a 1958 auto accident.
- John Carter (1815–1850) – English artist
- Vic Chesnutt (1964–2009) – Singer/songwriter
- Chuck Close (1940–2021) – American painter
- Darren Drozdov (1969–2023) – Professional wrestler, injured in a match with D'Lo Brown.
- Brooke Ellison (1978–2024) – First quadriplegic to graduate from Harvard University. Paralyzed when struck by a car in 1990.
- Jeff Erlanger (1970–2007) – Activist, appeared on Mister Rogers' Neighborhood.
- Steven Fletcher (born 1972) – Canadian Member of Parliament, paralyzed in an auto accident.
- John Paul Getty III (1956–2011) – Son of J. Paul Getty, left disabled after suffering a stroke.
- Matt Hampson (born 1984) – England rugby player, paralysed in a scrummaging accident.
- Stephen Hawking (1942–2018) – Physicist, paralyzed due to amyotrophic lateral sclerosis.
- Kent Hehr (born 1969) – Canadian politician, Member of Parliament from 2015–2019. Paralyzed in shooting accident at age 22.
- Jim Langevin (born 1964) – American politician, member of the US House of Representatives and first member of US Congress to serve with quadriplegia.
- Jill Kinmont (1936–2012) – U.S. skier, paralyzed in a skiing accident in 1955, subject of the movie The Other Side of the Mountain
- Samuel Koch (born 1987) – German actor and former stuntman who became paralysed in an accident while filming Wetten, dass..? in 2010
- Oksana Kononets (born 1992) – Ukrainian model
- Eric LeGrand (born 1990) – College football player. Paralyzed in a 2010 football game, but has since regained movement to his shoulders and feeling to most of his body.
- Jocelyn Lovell (born 1950) – Canadian cyclist hit by a truck while on a training ride.
- Tom Luckey (1940–2012) – American architect and sculptor best known for creating abstract playgrounds known as Luckey Climbers. Paralyzed due to a fall in 2005.
- Curtis Mayfield (1942–1999) – Soul singer/songwriter, paralyzed in a stage accident in 1990.
- Guy McElroy (1948–1990) – American art historian and curator
- Elena Mukhina (1960–2006) – Soviet gymnast and 1978 World AA Champion, paralyzed as a result of an under-rotation in a practice routine.
- Craig H. Neilsen (1941–2006) – American gaming executive who founded Ameristar Casinos, Inc., and formed the Craig H. Neilsen Foundation to fund scientific research and quality-of-life programs for people living with spinal cord injuries.
- Dinesh Palipana (born 1984) – Australian doctor, the first quadriplegic intern in Queensland, the second quadriplegic medical graduate in Australia. A spinal cord injury was caused as a result of a car accident.
- Teddy Pendergrass (1950–2010) – soul singer, paralyzed in an auto accident in 1982.
- Edward Rainey (born 1961) – Scottish painter
- Christopher Reeve (1952–2004) – Actor, injured in a 1995 eventing accident.
- Ed Roberts (1939–1995) – Disability rights activist, first quadriplegic to attend the University of California, Berkeley.
- George Robinson (born 1997) – Actor, injured in a 2015 rugby match.
- Patrick Rummerfield (born 1953) – first fully recovered quadriplegic, athlete, motivational speaker
- Ramón Sampedro (1943–1998) – Spanish fisherman, whose struggle for the right to die was dramatized in the film Mar Adentro.
- Sam Schmidt (born 1964) – IndyCar racing driver, paralysed in 2000 testing crash.
- Ken Slater (1924–1963) – Australian rules footballer and tennis player, paralyzed in car accident.
- Mary Lou Spiess (1931–1992) – American designer of disabled fashion, paralyzed as a result of polio.
- Max Starkloff (1937–2010) – American disability rights activist.
- Darryl Stingley (1951–2007) – American football player, paralyzed in a 1978 exhibition game.
- Sam Sullivan (born 1959) – Canadian politician, mayor of Vancouver from 2005 to 2008. Paralyzed in a skiing accident at age 19.
- Joni Eareckson Tada (born 1949) – Christian author and motivational speaker, paralyzed in a 1967 diving accident.
- James Troesh, a.k.a. Jim Troesh (1956–2011) – actor, screenwriter and entertainment industry disability advocate. Paralyzed, aged 14, following a home accident, he was the first quadriplegic actor to join the Screen Actors Guild.
- Barbara Turnbull (1965–2015) – Canadian newspaper journalist, and motivational writer, paralyzed in a 1993 robbery.
- Mike Utley (born 1965) – Former Detroit Lions lineman, injured on a Barry Sanders touchdown run in 1991.
- Johnnie Wilder Jr. (1949–2006) – Co-founder and lead vocalist of the international R&B/funk group Heatwave.
- Frank Williams (1942–2021) – Co-founder of Williams Racing in Formula One. Injured in a 1986 car accident.
- Sheikh Ahmed Yassin (1937–2004) – Former leader of Hamas
- Mark Zupan (born 1975) – American wheelchair rugby player, featured in the film Murderball. Paralyzed in a 1993 auto accident.
- RockyNoHands (born 1987) – Online alias of Rocky Stoutenburgh, American gaming streamer. First quadriplegic to be signed to an esports organization.

== See also ==
- List of people with paraplegia
