= Mandelbox =

Fractal with a boxlike shape

A "scale-2" Mandelbox

A "scale-3" Mandelbox

A "scale -1.5" Mandelbox

In mathematics, the mandelbox is a fractal with a boxlike shape found by Tom Lowe in 2010. It is defined in a similar way to the famous Mandelbrot set as the values of a parameter such that the origin does not escape to infinity under iteration of certain geometrical transformations. The mandelbox is defined as a map of continuous Julia sets, but, unlike the Mandelbrot set, can be defined in any number of dimensions. It is typically drawn in three dimensions for illustrative purposes.

== Simple definition ==
The simple definition of the mandelbox is this: repeatedly transform a vector z, according to the following rules:

1. First, for each component c of z (which corresponds to a dimension), if c is greater than 1, subtract it from 2; or if c is less than -1, subtract it from −2.
2. Then, depending on the magnitude of the vector, change its magnitude using some fixed values and a specified scale factor.

== Generation ==
The iteration applies to vector z as follows in pseudocode:

function iterate(z):
    for each component in z:
        if component > 1:
            component := 2 - component
        else if component < -1:
            component := -2 - component

    if magnitude of z < 0.5:
        z := z * 4
    else if magnitude of z < 1:
        z := z / (magnitude of z)^2
   
    z := scale * z + c

Here, c is the constant being tested, and scale is a real number.

== Properties ==
A notable property of the mandelbox, particularly for scale −1.5, is that it contains approximations of many well known fractals within it.

For $1 < |\text{scale}| < 2$ the mandelbox contains a solid core. Consequently, its fractal dimension is 3, or n when generalised to n dimensions.

For $\text{scale} < -1$ the mandelbox sides have length 4 and for $1 < \text{scale} \leq 4 \sqrt{n} + 1$ they have length $4 \cdot \frac{\text{scale} + 1}{\text{scale} - 1}$.

== See also ==
- Mandelbulb
- Buddhabrot
- Lichtenberg figure
