= Walter Harris Callow =

Canadian veteran and inventor

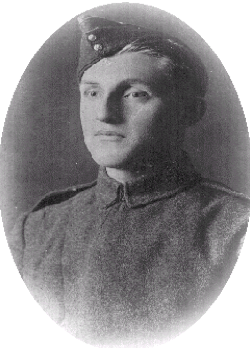
- Born: 1896; Parrsboro, Nova Scotia, Canada
- Died: 1958 (aged 61–62)
- Occupation: Real estate agent
- Known for: inventing the accessibility bus for veterans

Walter Harris Callow (1896–1958) was a Canadian veteran who invented the accessibility bus for veterans returning from WW2 and others in wheelchairs (1947). He designed and managed the Walter Callow Wheelchair Bus, while he himself was blind, quadriplegic and, eventually had both legs amputated. Callow planned trips for disabled veterans, tours of the countryside, picnics, sporting events, art classes and other activities. He was born in Parrsboro, Nova Scotia and became a resident of the Camp Hill Military Hospital for twenty years.

== Biography ==
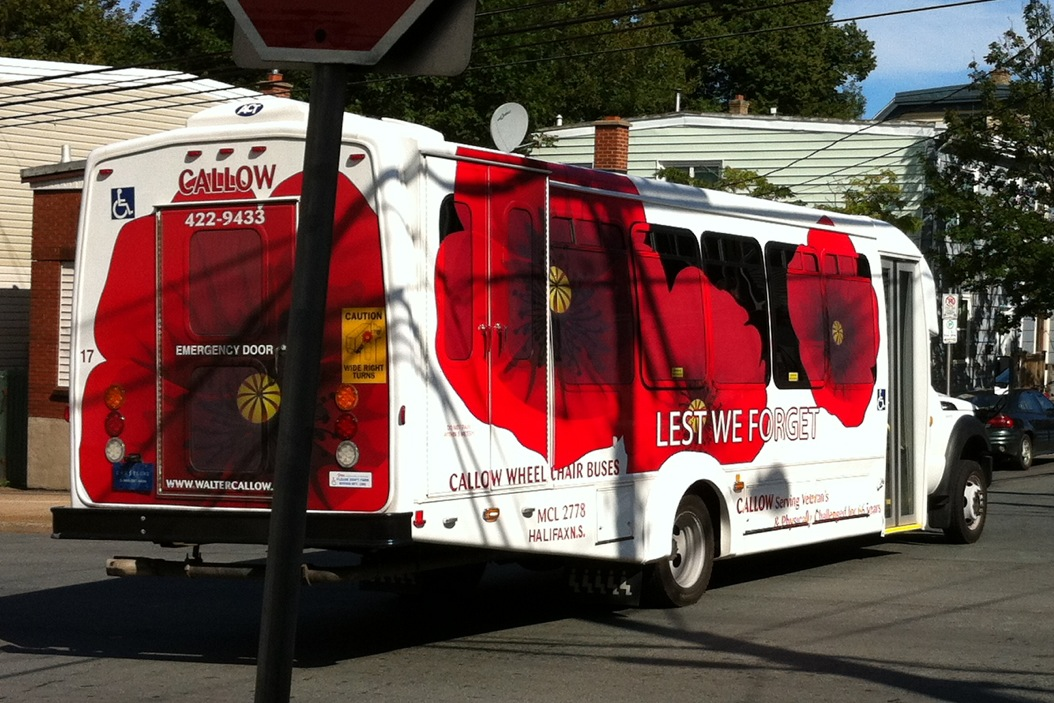
Walter Callow Wheel Chair Bus (2013), Halifax, Nova Scotia

As a member of the Royal Flying Corps in Camp Mohawk, Ontario, Callow crashed in a test flight in 1918. He received a serious back injury and a heart condition. He continued on in a lumber business in Advocate, Nova Scotia. He eventually became bed-ridden in 1931 because of his injuries, the same year his mother and wife died and left him with a young child. He continued business by selling real-estate.

In 1937 Callow became a full-time resident of the Camp Hill Hospital and two years later he was blind and quadriplegic. While at the Hospital he established a board of directors and hired two secretaries. He established the Callow Cigarette Fund to send cigarettes to soldiers serving over-seas during World War II.

After the war, he turned his cigarette fund into a wheelchair coach service for disabled veterans (1947). He started by having two custom-made buses built in Pubnico, Nova Scotia; five subsequent buses were built by Prevost, and smaller models by others followed. He named the company the "Callow Veterans' and Invalids' Welfare League" and established an office in Halifax. He worked tirelessly to make facilities accessible and to make visible the needs of those with physical disabilities. The Walter Callow bus system operated throughout Nova Scotia until 2019, and a single Callow bus operated out of Lethbridge, Alberta between 1954 and 1969.

Walter Harris Callow's funeral was conducted in Halifax with full military honours. The only time that Callow had the opportunity to ride on his bus is when his body was returned to Advocate to be buried.

== Legacy ==
There was an unveiling of the Walter Callow Memorial Plaque at the Advocate cemetery on 10 August 2001.

The Walter Callow Wheelchair Bus ceased operations in 2018.

== See also ==
- Military history of Nova Scotia
- List of people with quadriplegia
- Wheelchair accessible van
