= Colt Wynn =

American professional bodybuilder (born 1985)

- Born: May 23, 1985 (age 40–41); Fleming, Ohio, U.S.
- Died: August 27, 2024
- Known for: Participating in paralympic bodybuilding
- Spouse: Professional bodybuilder

Colt Wynn (May 23, 1985 - August 27, 2024) was an American professional bodybuilder who competed in the wheelchair tournaments for paraplegic athletes.

In November 1999, when he was 14, Wynn fell 14 feet (4 m) from a deer hunting stand in a tree near his family home in Fleming, Ohio. The fall broke his back, leaving him paralyzed. During his initial hospitalization, he lost 38 pounds (17 kg). As part of his rehabilitation, he took up weight lifting to strengthen his upper body. He would later state that his determination to use weight lifting as physical therapy enabled him to leave his hospital three weeks ahead of schedule.

Wynn would later recall that he refused to be defined by his paralysis. When his father told him, "Son, we all learn to live with this disability," Wynn replied:"Dad, I'm not disabled. I'm just rearranged. I'm still Colt Wynn."

Wynn initially sought to concentrate on powerlifting. "I remember the first powerlifting competition I did," he told an interviewer. "I was the only disabled kid in a class of 20 guys. I won the 135-pound (61 kg) weight class, just by five pounds on the bench. From there, it branched off into bodybuilding."

Within three years of his accident, Wynn competed in his first bodybuilding championship, the 2002 NPC Wheelchair Nationals, where he won first place in the middleweight division. His good friend, Dr. Bill Bauer (whom he met in the hospital while recovering from his injury, got him started in competitive swimming and worked with him in the Weight room at the local YMCA in Marietta, Ohio. He won the same division again in 2003, 2004, 2006 and 2007, and won the 2008 light-heavyweight class. He also won the overall title for the 2003, 2006 and 2008 NPC Wheelchair Nationals. In 2007, he won the IFBB Pro Wheelchair Nationals, earning his professional bodybuilding card.

Outside of bodybuilding, Wynn had been active in personal training and motivational speaking. As Wynn told an interviewer: “When I was younger, it was a dream of mine to travel the United States and the world, to see different places and new things. So far, I've been almost all over the States and Canada. So it's like my dream's about to come true."
