= Mandelbulb =

Three-dimensional fractal

A 4K UHD 3D Mandelbulb video

A ray-marched image of the 3D Mandelbulb for the iteration v ↦ v^{8} + c

The Mandelbulb is a three-dimensional fractal developed in 2009 by Daniel White and Paul Nylander using spherical coordinates.

A canonical 3-dimensional Mandelbrot set does not exist, since there is no 3-dimensional analogue of the 2-dimensional space of complex numbers. It is possible to construct Mandelbrot sets in 4 dimensions using quaternions and bicomplex numbers.

White and Nylander's formula for the "nth power" of the vector $\mathbf v = \langle x, y, z\rangle$ in ℝ^{3} is

$$\mathbf v^n := r^n \langle\sin(n\theta) \cos(n\phi), \sin(n\theta) \sin(n\phi), \cos(n\theta)\rangle,$$

where

$$r = \sqrt{x^2 + y^2 + z^2},$$
$$\phi = \arctan\frac{y}{x} = \arg(x + yi),$$
$$\theta = \arctan\frac{\sqrt{x^2 + y^2}}{z} = \arccos\frac{z}{r}.$$

The Mandelbulb is then defined as the set of those $\mathbf c$ in ℝ^{3} for which the orbit of $\langle 0, 0, 0\rangle$ under the iteration $\mathbf v \mapsto \mathbf v^n + \mathbf c$ is bounded. For n > 3, the result is a 3-dimensional bulb-like structure with fractal surface detail and a number of "lobes" depending on n. Many of their graphic renderings use n = 8. However, the equations can be simplified into rational polynomials when n is odd. For example, in the case n = 3, the third power can be simplified into the more elegant form:

$$\langle x, y, z\rangle^3 = \left\langle\frac{(3z^2 - x^2 - y^2) x (x^2 - 3y^2)}{x^2 + y^2}, \frac{(3z^2 - x^2 - y^2) y (3x^2 - y^2)}{x^2 + y^2}, z (z^2 - 3x^2 - 3y^2)\right\rangle.$$

The Mandelbulb given by the formula above is actually one in a family of fractals given by parameters (p, q) given by

$$\mathbf v^n := r^n \langle\sin(p\theta) \cos(q\phi), \sin(p\theta) \sin(q\phi), \cos(p\theta)\rangle.$$

Since p and q do not necessarily have to equal n for the identity |v^{n}| = |v|^{n} to hold, more general fractals can be found by setting

$$\mathbf v^n := r^n \big\langle\sin\big(f(\theta, \phi)\big) \cos\big(g(\theta, \phi)\big), \sin\big(f(\theta, \phi)\big) \sin\big(g(\theta, \phi)\big), \cos\big(f(\theta, \phi)\big)\big\rangle$$

for functions f and g.

== Cubic formula ==
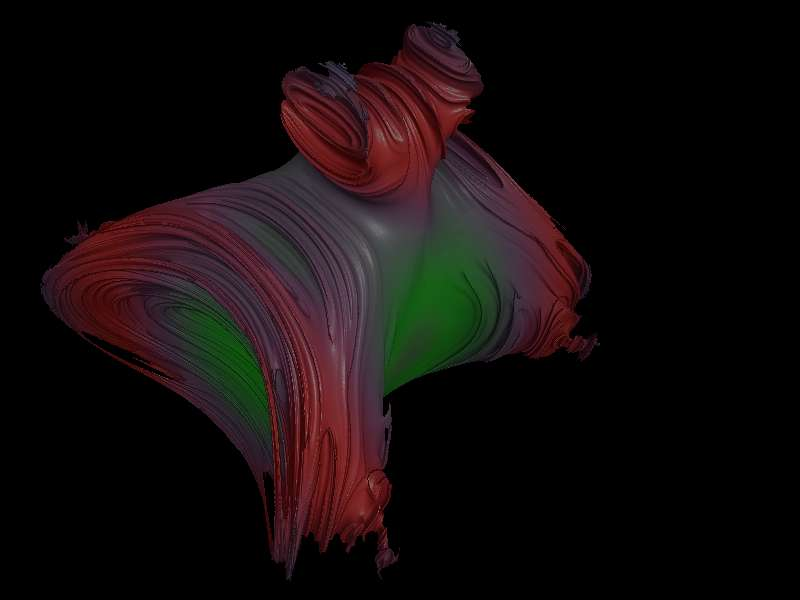
Cubic fractal

Other formulae come from identities parametrizing the sum of squares to give a power of the sum of squares, such as

$$(x^3 - 3xy^2 - 3xz^2)^2 + (y^3 - 3yx^2 + yz^2)^2 + (z^3 - 3zx^2 + zy^2)^2 = (x^2 + y^2 + z^2)^3,$$

which we can think of as a way to cube a triplet of numbers so that the modulus is cubed. So this gives, for example,

$$x \to x^3 - 3x (y^2 + z^2) + x_0$$
$$y \to -y^3 + 3 y x^2 - y z^2  + y_0$$
$$z \to z^3 - 3 z x^2 + z y^2 + z_0$$

or other permutations.

This reduces to the complex fractal $w \to w^3 + w_0$ when z = 0 and $w \to \overline{w}^3 + w_0$ when y = 0.

There are several ways to combine two such "cubic" transforms to get a power-9 transform, which has slightly more structure.

== Quintic formula ==
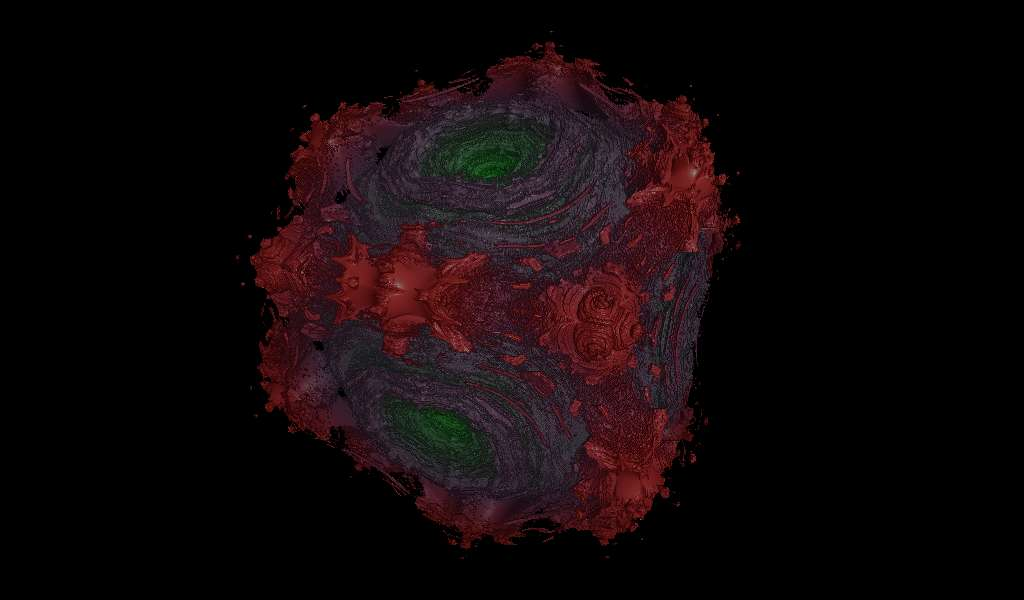
Quintic Mandelbulb

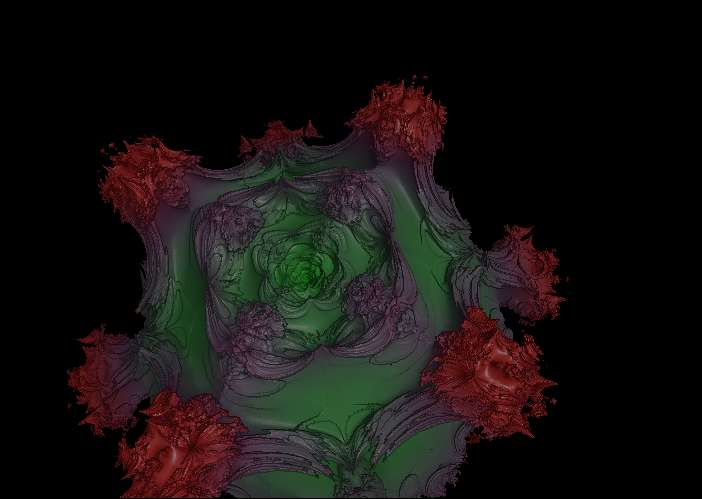
Quintic Mandelbulb with C = 2

Another way to create Mandelbulbs with cubic symmetry is by taking the complex iteration formula $z \to z^{4m+1} + z_0$ for some integer m and adding terms to make it symmetrical in 3 dimensions but keeping the cross-sections to be the same 2-dimensional fractal. (The 4 comes from the fact that $i^4 = 1$.) For example, take the case of $z \to z^5 + z_0$. In two dimensions, where $z = x + iy$, this is

$$x \to x^5 - 10 x^3 y^2 + 5 x y^4 + x_0,$$
$$y \to y^5 - 10 y^3 x^2 + 5 y x^4 + y_0.$$

This can be then extended to three dimensions to give

$$x \to x^5 - 10 x^3 (y^2 + A y z + z^2) + 5 x (y^4 + B y^3 z + C y^2 z^2 + B y z^3 + z^4) + D x^2 y z (y+z) + x_0,$$
$$y \to y^5 - 10 y^3 (z^2 + A x z + x^2) + 5 y (z^4  + B z^3 x +  C z^2 x^2  + B z x^3 + x^4) + D y^2 z x (z+x)+ y_0,$$
$$z \to z^5 - 10 z^3 (x^2 + A x y + y^2) + 5 z (x^4  + B x^3 y + C x^2 y^2  + B x y^3 + y^4) + D z^2 x y (x+y) +z_0$$

for arbitrary constants A, B, C and D, which give different Mandelbulbs (usually set to 0). The case $z \to z^9$ gives a Mandelbulb most similar to the first example, where n = 9. A more pleasing result for the fifth power is obtained by basing it on the formula $z \to -z^5 + z_0$.

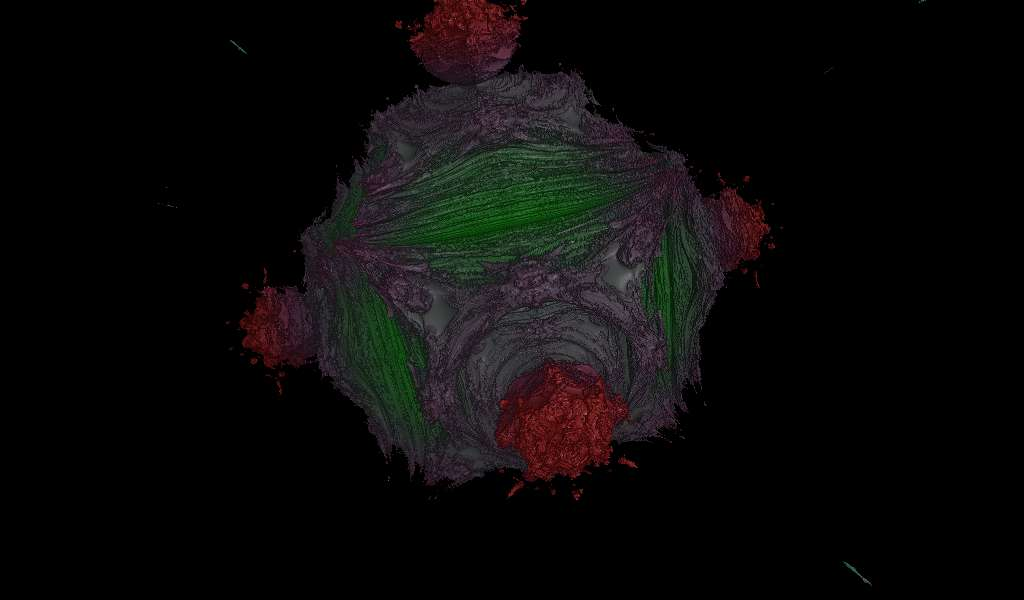
Fractal based on z → −z^{5}

== Power-nine formula ==
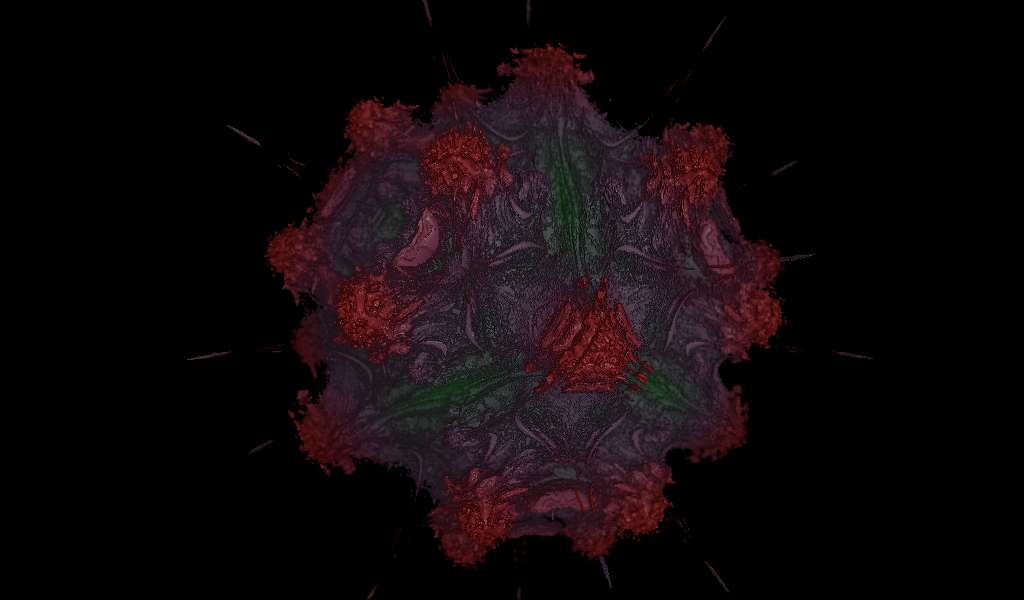
Fractal with z^{9} Mandelbrot cross-sections

This fractal has cross-sections of the power-9 Mandelbrot fractal. It has 32 small bulbs sprouting from the main sphere. It is defined by, for example,

$$x \to x^9 - 36 x^7 (y^2 + z^2) + 126 x^5 (y^2 + z^2)^2 - 84 x^3 (y^2 + z^2)^3 + 9 x (y^2 + z^2)^4 + x_0,$$
$$y \to y^9 - 36 y^7 (z^2 + x^2) + 126 y^5 (z^2 + x^2)^2 - 84 y^3 (z^2 + x^2)^3 + 9 y (z^2 + x^2)^4 + y_0,$$
$$z \to z^9 - 36 z^7 (x^2 + y^2) + 126 z^5 (x^2 + y^2)^2 - 84 z^3 (x^2 + y^2)^3 + 9 z (x^2 + y^2)^4 + z_0.$$

These formula can be written in a shorter way:

$$x \to \frac{1}{2} \left(x + i\sqrt{y^2 + z^2}\right)^9 + \frac{1}{2} \left(x - i\sqrt{y^2 + z^2}\right)^9 + x_0$$

and equivalently for the other coordinates.

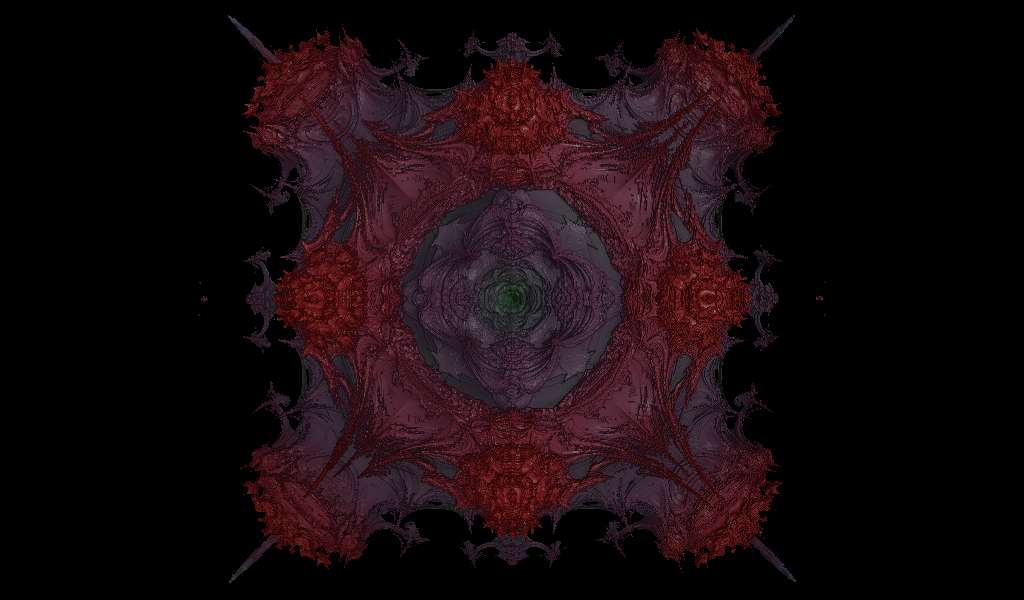
Power-nine fractal detail

== Spherical formula ==
A perfect spherical formula can be defined as a formula

$$(x,y,z) \to \big(f(x, y, z) + x_0, g(x, y, z) + y_0, h(x, y, z) + z_0\big),$$

where

$$(x^2 + y^2 + z^2)^n = f(x, y, z)^2 + g(x, y, z)^2 + h(x, y, z)^2,$$

where f, g and h are nth-power rational trinomials and n is an integer. The cubic fractal above is an example.

== Uses in media ==
- In the 2014 animated film Big Hero 6, the climax takes place in the middle of a wormhole, which is represented by the stylized interior of a Mandelbulb.
- In the 2018 science fiction horror film Annihilation, an extraterrestrial being appears in the form of a partial Mandelbulb.
- In the webcomic Unsounded the spirit realm of the khert is represented by a stylized golden mandelbulb.
- In the 2013-2020 drama show Marvel's Agents of S.H.I.E.L.D., season 7, episode 13, "What We're Fighting For", the beginning shows the S.H.I.E.L.D. team travel through the Quantum Realm whose opening appearance from the outside resembles the end of an internally rotating mandelbulb.
- In the 2016 film Marvel's Doctor Strange, one of the dimensions Strange is shown by the Ancient One depicts the top end of an expanding mandelbulb.
- In the 2020 film 2067, as the main character is arriving in the future, the distorted land he descends upon resembles a distorted and morphing mandelbulb.

== See also ==
- Mandelbox
- List of fractals by Hausdorff dimension
