= Peter Berry (basketball) =

American wheelchair basketball player

Personal information
- Full name: Peter Bram Berry
- Born: October 30, 2001 (age 24) Houston, Texas, U.S.
- Education: The Emery/Weiner School; University of Alabama
- Occupations: Wheelchair basketball player; social media personality
- Years active: 2011–present
Medal record
Representing the United States
Men's wheelchair basketball
Parapan American Games
Gold medal – first place	2023 Santiago	Team

Peter Bram Berry (born October 30, 2001) is an American wheelchair basketball player for the United States men's national wheelchair basketball team and social media personality. At age nine, a car accident left him paralyzed from the waist down.

Berry started competing in wheelchair basketball for TIRR Memorial Hermann soon after his accident. In 2019, he accepted an athletic scholarship to play for the University of Alabama's wheelchair basketball team, (Note: The university's wheelchair basketball team is known as "Roll Tide".) where he began in 2020.

== Early life ==
Berry was raised in Houston, Texas with his younger brother and sister by parents Joshua and Robin Berry, and is Jewish. When he was nine years old, he and his family were involved in a motor vehicle collision when a distracted driver collided head-on with their vehicle, resulting in the death of his parents, and he and younger brother Aaron becoming paralyzed from the waist down and wheelchair users. After the story was published by several news outlets across the United States, singer Justin Bieber launched the "Show Your Hearts" campaign aimed at raising funds for Berry's family. After his accident, Berry and his two siblings were taken in by their aunt and uncle, and resided in the Bellaire area. He attended the Emery/Weiner School.

== Career ==
=== Basketball ===
While recovering from his injury, Berry started competing in wheelchair basketball, where he quickly became one of the best young wheelchair athletes in the United States. He led his TIRR Memorial Hermann Hotwheels team to three national titles and one national softball title. This success led him to receive a scholarship to play division 1 wheelchair basketball at the University of Alabama. In January 2020, he won the inaugural Houston Sports Insperity Inspiration Award.

In 2022, Berry started training for the 2024 Summer Paralympics with his teammates from the University of Alabama. On March 30, 2024, he was named to Team USA's roster to compete at the 2024 Summer Paralympics.

=== Television ===
In 2021, he and his brother appeared on an episode of Tamron Hall, to discuss their respective successes in wheelchair basketball.

=== Social media ===
In 2022, he posted a video on TikTok of him playing wheelchair basketball against his able bodied friend when he is pushed out of his wheelchair. It went viral, receiving over 3.5 million views and over 630 thousand likes.

=== Acting ===
Berry will make his acting debut in the Netflix television series adaptation of the hockey romance novel Icebreaker, in which he will star alongside Auli'i Cravalho.

== Personal life ==
Over the years, he has become close friends with J. J. Watt.

== Filmography ==
Year	Title	Role	Note	Ref.
2021	Tamron Hall Show	Himself	Interview	
TBA	Icebreaker	Robbie	Acting debut	

== Awards ==
Year	Award	Result	Ref.
2020	Houston Sports Award – Insperity Inspiration Award	Won	

== See also ==
- List of people from Houston
- List of people with paraplegia
