= Aamish =

Indian DJ and producer (born 1991)

- Born: Varun Khullar; February 9, 1991 (age 35); Delhi
- Other name: DJ Aamish
- Occupations: DJ, music producer
- Years active: 2014–present
- Awards: Limca Book of records – India's First DJ with Disability
- Website: https://www.djaamish.com/

Aamish is an Indian DJ and music producer who is also known as Varun Khullar (born 9 February 1991). He is the first and only disabled DJ from India.

== Early life ==
Aamish was born in Delhi on 9 February 1991, to engineer couple Amit Khullar and Shashi Khullar. He completed his schooling from ITL Public School Dwarka, New Delhi and graduated from Delhi University, Delhi in Bachelor of Arts (Foreign Trade and International Practices). Varun met with an accident and was paralysed while he was pursuing his master's degree in mass communication from Amity University, Noida.

== Musical career ==
Varun Khullar, a.k.a Aamish, began his musical career in 2014. In 2014, Varun had an accident but he didn't let his dream die. He learned music from books and did that for two years. He joined ILM Academy in Gurgaon in 2016. In 2017, he joined Kitty Su, Delhi as a DJ. He has performed at TimeOut 72 event in Goa.

== Discography ==
=== Singles ===
- Interstellar
- Interstellar – Aleksandr Kashnikov Remix
- Bhuddhabrot
- Dimensions of Space

== Achievements ==
In 2017 – Epic Wards

In 2018 – Bharat Prerna Awards

In 2018 – tedxahlconintlschool

in 2019 – Limca Book of Records
