= Oksana Kononets =

Ukrainian model, entrepreneur, and public figure

- Born: September 1, 1992 (age 33); Kyiv, Ukraine
- Occupation: model
- Years active: 2015–present
- Website: www.oksanakononets.com

Oksana Kononets (Ukrainian: Оксана Кононець; born 1 September 1992) is the first quadriplegic Ukrainian model, entrepreneur, and public figure. Kononets is best known for winning the Beauty No Limits contest in 2016, as well as receiving the title of "Miss Elegance". She then won the title of "Miss Individuality" in the first world beauty contest for women in wheelchairs, Miss Wheelchair World 2017. She is also the founder and director of the Charity Foundation 'Neskoreni' in Ukraine. Following that, she was named one of Ukraine's top 100 woman by the Ukrainian People magazine. Most recently, she has been named as a laureate in the Ukrainian "Women of the Third Millennium" Award.

== Childhood ==
Oksana Kononets was born in Kyiv, Ukraine, to the family of a serviceman. She lived in Chortkiv, where her father's air regiment was located until 11 years old. Kononets was an active child who was fond of playing the violin and piano and was also highly proficient in gymnastics and aerobics. In 2003, Kononets returned to live in Kyiv, following the demobilization of her father. In Kyiv, Kononets was keen on sports, and took part in many competitions. In high school, she began to pursue her passion as a make-up artist. After high school, she attended university at the National Pedagogical Dragomanov University.

== Trauma ==
On August 23, 2012, as a result of a fall from the 5th floor of an apartment building, Kononets suffered a severe injury to the C5 and C6 vertebrae of her cervical spine, which rendered her quadriplegic, reliant on a wheelchair.

== Post Accident Career ==
In 2013, after her injury, Kononets graduated from the National Pedagogical Dragomanova University with a teaching degree, and then from the Open International University of Human Development "Ukraine" with a degree in social work. In 2015, she took part in the television show "Halves" in which she then realized she was strong enough to build a modeling career, inspired by American model Angela Rockwood.

=== Winner, Beauty no Limits Contest ===
Kononets became the winner of the 6th Ukrainian beauty contest for women in wheelchairs, Beauty No Limits in which she also won the title of "Miss Elegance".

=== Miss Wheelchair World ===
Kononets won the title of "Miss Individuality" in the first world beauty contest for women in wheelchairs, Miss Wheelchair World, held in Warsaw, Poland.

=== Unbroken Beauty ===
Following her achievements, Kononets became the author and organizer of Unbroken Beauty, a social photo project focused on positively portraying women in wheelchairs.

=== "Neskoreni" Charity Fund ===
Kononets then founded the charity fund, "Neskoreni" with the purpose of integrating people with disabilities into the photography and fashion industry in Ukraine.

=== Miss Ukraine Universe ===
Kononets was the first jury member in a wheelchair for "Miss Ukraine Universe".

=== Ukraine's Top 100 Women ===
Kononets was included in Ukraine People Magazine's choices of the top 100 women in the country.

=== Co-star in Music video of ONUKA ===
Kononets was filmed in the clips of the popular Ukrainian singer ONUKA, which was shot by a famous director Alan Badoyev and Ukrainian singer Lyubochka.

=== 2018 ===
==== Ukraine Fashion Week ====
In 2018, Kononets became the first model in a wheelchair to be on the podium of Ukraine Fashion Week. She then participated in the fashion show of designer, Sofia Rusinovich.

==== Massira Inclusive Fashion Show ====
In the same year she also represented Ukraine in the first Massira Inclusive Fashion Show in Sri Lanka, organized within the framework of the Paris Asian-European Fashion Week.

==== Beauty no Limits ====
She has also become a co-organizer for several beauty contests in Ukraine, including the Beauty No Limits for women in wheelchairs, and the Courage No Limits contest for men in wheelchairs.

==== O'SHE lingerie ====
In May she became the first woman with a disability to be featured as a model for the O'SHE lingerie and underwear line.

==== Women of the Third Millennium ====
Most recently she was named as a laureate of the Ukrainian "Women of the Third Millennium" award
