= Mary Lou Spiess =

American fashion designer, polio survivor and disability advocate

- Spiess in 1977

Mary Lou Spiess (c. 1931 – June 18, 1992) was an American disability advocate, teacher, and designer of disabled fashion.

== Biography ==
Mary Lou Spiess was born Mary Lou Crump, around 1931. After graduating from Analy High School in 1947, she attended the College of the Pacific, and graduated in 1950.

She married Harold Spiess in 1951. They had a son, and lived in Sebastopol, California when she contracted polio in 1955 at the age of 24. This left Spiess, in her own words, a quadriplegic. Before her sickness, Spiess was an elementary school teacher, and by 1960 she was able to successfully work from home as an elementary and secondary school level tutor for remedial reading, algebra and languages. This was despite having to sleep in an iron lung and being reliant upon daily use of a pneumobelt.

In 1985, Spiess (now living in Stockton, California since 1966, and using a motorised wheelchair to get about) spoke to the Lawrence Journal-World who described her as pioneering, and being "the grandmother" of disabled fashion. Spiess explained how as a disabled person, she noticed that clothing no longer fitted her properly, making it "impossible to look nice", but she was able to think about solutions and operate a sewing machine using her toes. In 1977, she contributed towards Le Chic, a book about clothing and fashion for disabled people authored by disabled people, and edited by Melodie Sells. After Spiess published her thoughts on how to dress smartly as a disabled person, others started consulting her and writing in to ask her advice. Practical issues addressed by Spiess included how to avoid skirts getting caught in wheelchair wheels, and the necessity of robust waistbands that would stay put when the wearer needed to be helped up in her chair. Spiess emphasized in 1985 that it was important for disabled people to access nice clothing for their self-esteem and to present a positive image to other disabled people.

In 1985, she was given a Distinguished Alumni Award from the University of the Pacific.

Spiess died June 18, 1992, at her home in Stockton, aged 63.
