= Fleming, Ohio =

Unincorporated community in Ohio, U.S.

Coordinates: 39°23′30″N 81°36′38″W

Fleming is a small unincorporated community in rural eastern Barlow Township, Washington County, Ohio, United States.

Located along State Route 550 between Barlow and Marietta, it is surrounded by farmland dotted with occasional trees. It lies near the Wayne National Forest. The headwaters of Wolf Creek, a stream that meets the Muskingum River at Waterford to the north, flow near Fleming.

== History ==
Fleming was laid out in 1853. A post office called Fleming was established in 1866.
