= Nicole Niquille =

Swiss mountain guide

Nicole Catherine Isabelle Niquille
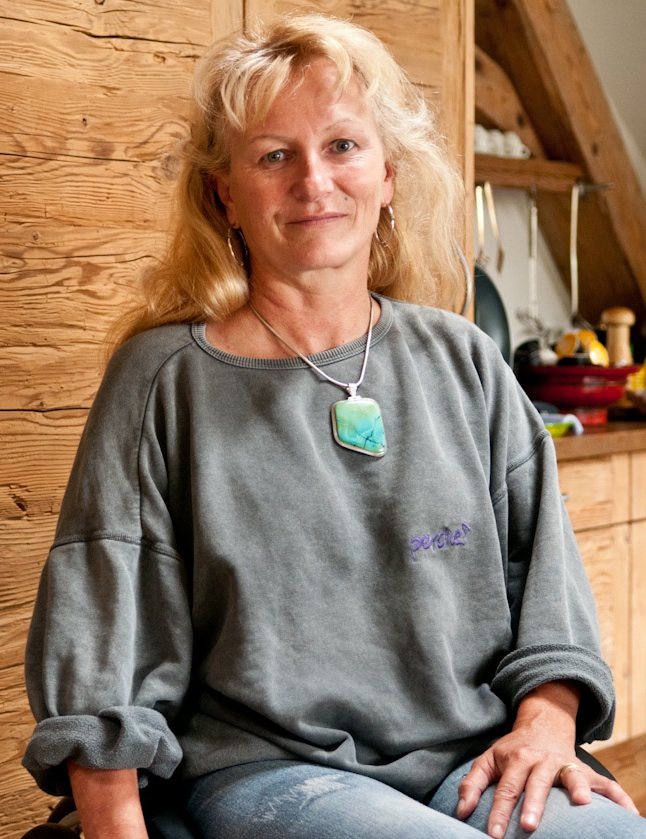
- Nicole Niquille in 2011
- Born: 13 May 1956 (age 70); Fribourg, Switzerland
- Occupation: Mountain guide
- Known for: First Swiss woman to have obtained the mountain guide certification, first woman to ascend over 8,000m without supplementary oxygen
- Spouse: Marco Vuadens (1997-present)
- Partner: Erhard Loretan (1975-1986)
- Honours: Lifetime Achievement Award from the Swiss Paraplegic Foundation, Honorary Member of the Swiss Mountain Guide Association

Nicole Catherine Isabelle Niquille (born 13 May 1956) is a Swiss mountain guide, mountaineer and humanitarian. She is the first Swiss woman to become a certified mountain guide and the first woman to reach over 8,000m without supplementary oxygen.

== Biography ==
Born in Fribourg, as one of four children, Nicole Niquille grew up in Charmey, Gruyère District, in the heart of the Fribourg Alps. When she was 18, she had a serious motorcycle accident, which nearly resulted in the loss of her left leg. To recover, she was prescribed as much exercise as possible. It was then when her twin sister Françoise introduced her to climbing. Through climbing, she met Erhard Loretan, who would become her partner in climbing and life for the next decade.

Together with Loretan, Niquille would make a number of expeditions to the Alps and to the Himalayas. She climbed the Frendo pillar on Mont Blanc, made some first ascents of the Aiguilles Rouges, as well as climbed the English route on Norway's Trollryggen. At the same time, she began training to become a mountain guide.

On the first day of her mountain guide course in 1984, the instructor called for a "Mr. Nicole Niquille", not expecting a woman to be participating in the course.

In 1985, she made an expedition to K2, where she lived for two months at base camp, and fell in love with the Himalayas and the people. On her summit attempt, she had to turn back at 7,600m due to thrombosis, possibly due to her previous motorcycle injury. After turning back, it took her 16 hours to return to base camp on her own.

The next year, she made an attempt to climb Mount Everest. She cut her trip to the Himalayas short to return to Switzerland to complete her certification to become a mountain guide.

Her certification process required her to complete every exercise as the men on the course, where she estimates she was tested twice as hard. For example, during the abseiling exercise, she had to secure the heaviest participant. She persevered, and on 27 September 1986 she became the first woman to become a Swiss mountain guide. In Switzerland, her graduation was widely reported, as women only received the right to vote in 1971 and were excluded from the Swiss Alpine Club until 1980.

She became widely known in Switzerland when she appeared in the 1991 documentary Visages suisses directed by Claude Goretta. In it, she accompanied a client to the summit of the Zinalrothorn (4,222 metres). In 1991, she led a successful expedition to Gasherbrum II, where four members of the team reached the summit.

=== Paralysis ===
On 8 May 1994 Niquille lost the use of her legs completely after suffering a concussion while picking mushrooms. She was hit by a falling rock, fractured her skull, and was paralyzed. It would take over twenty months for her to recover, after which she had to stop her work as a mountain guide. After recovery, she began a new career as a restaurant manager in Lac de Tanay. There, she met her second husband Marco Vuadens, as well as Ang Gelu Sherpa, the brother of Pasang Lhamu Sherpa, the first woman to summit Mount Everest.

In 2003, Nicole and Marco established the Foundation Nicole Niquille to support the work of a new woman's hospital to be created in Nepal around Mount Everest, as well as to support the memory of Pasang Lhamu Sherpa.

Two years later in 2005, the Foundation Nicole Niquille opened the Pasang Lhamu Nicole Niquille Hospital, in Lukla, at the foot of the Nepalese side of Mount Everest. The hospital treats 900 patients per month from the local area.

In 2022, Niquille summitted the Breithorn in Zermatt (4,163 m) in a specially designed sled, escorted by a rope team of 16 women. The unique sled was made of a racing car seat attached to a snowboard, and pulled by women wearing harnesses designed for sled dogs. It was her first summit in the Alps since her accident. In October of that year, she was honored with a Lifetime Achievement Award by the Swiss Paraplegic Foundation for being a role model for disabled people in Switzerland.

== Filmography ==
- 1987 - Nicole Niquille, Guide de montagne
- 1987 - Le troisième pôle, Jean Afanassieff
- 1991 - Swiss Faces / Visages suisses, Claude Goretta
- 2014 - La doppia vita di Nicole, Mario Casella
- 2016 - Jean Troillet, toujours aventurier, Sébastien Devrient

== Bibliography ==
- Corbaz, Aimé; Niquille, Nicole (2011). Et soudain, une montagne dans le ciel... Lausanne: Éditions Favre. p. 192.
- Nicole Niquille : Guide de montagne de Viviane Mermod-Gasser, Jean Mayerat, Nag Ansorge, Jacques Bulliard, 1987, 50 min [présentation en ligne]
- Claude Goretta. Visages suisses.
