= Edward Stinson Brown, Jr. =

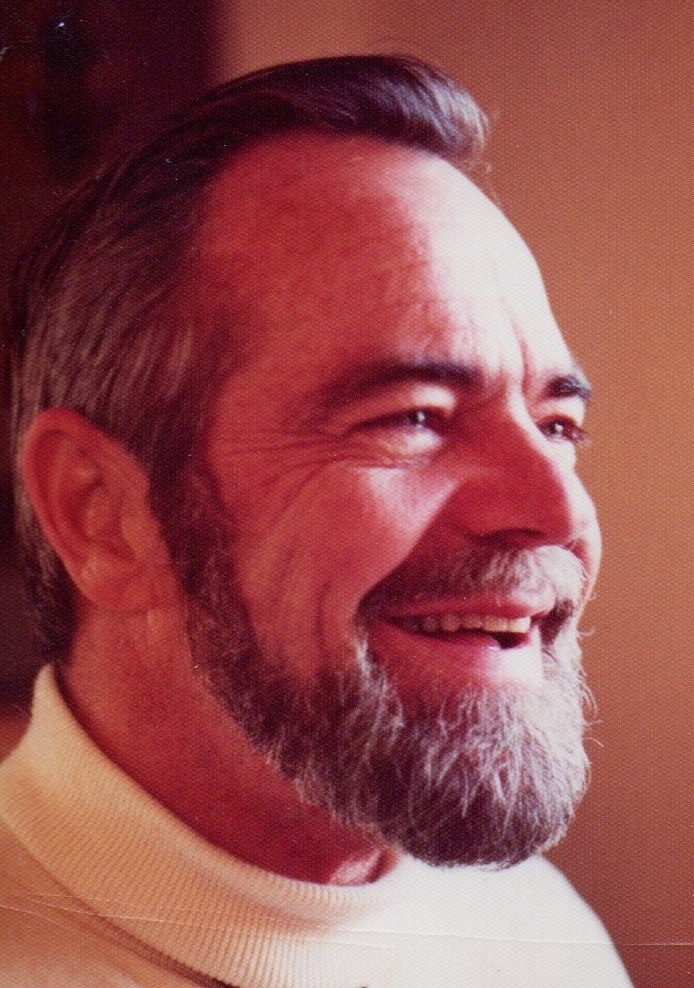
- Brown at age 59
- Born: March 9, 1920; Bloomington IN US
- Died: June 6, 2005 (aged 85); Albuquerque NM US

Edward Stinson Brown, Jr. (March 9, 1920 – June 6, 2005) was an American World War II Army veteran and a civilian atomic weapons maintenance specialist at Sandia Base. He was a paraplegic for 62 years, following injuries by ordnance fragments (shrapnel) at age 23 in the Main Attack of the Battle of Monte Cassino. At Sandia Base in the 1950s, from his wheelchair, he trained groups of officers how to maintain atomic bombs using manuals that he co-authored. He married after his injuries, a union that lasted 61 years. He and his wife adopted two boys. He volunteered extensive community service, and was a lay leader in the First Presbyterian Church of Albuquerque, New Mexico.

== Early life ==
Brown was born in Bloomington, Indiana, US, to Edward Stinson Brown, Sr., and Golden Glee Ragle Brown. His father was a bricklayer, secretary of YMCAs in Kentucky, Indiana, and Helena Montana, "well known for his work among immigrants", building advisor to the American Red Cross, a lay leader in the Methodist Church, and a 32nd degree Mason . Brown's mother died when he was 10, after which he was raised by his father and sister, Margaret Rebekah Brown (later Martz), who was six years older. Brown graduated from Mt. Vernon High School (Mt. Vernon, Indiana) in 1937 and graduated from Purdue University with a B.S. in electrical engineering in 1941 . While at Purdue, in about 1939, he founded the first men's coop residence, Kagawa House, later Kneale House, still operating in 2024, and, as a senior, was president of the Purdue Wesley Foundation . Brown studied Military Science and Tactics for four years in the Purdue Reserve Officers' Training Corps .

== Military service and injuries ==
Upon graduation from Purdue in 1941, Brown was commissioned as a Second Lieutenant in the Field Artillery and ordered to active duty. After 3 months of advanced officer training at Ft. Sill, Oklahoma, he was assigned to the First Field Artillery Observation Battalion of the 36th Field Artillery Brigade at Ft. Bragg, North Carolina. He was trained to provide location of enemy artillery, surveying, and meteorology data to the US Army artillery for purposes of counter fire, work that required engineering skills and advanced mathematics. At Ft. Bragg, he was assigned to lead physical training drills and to train other officers in the use of the.45-calibre pistol, .30-calibre rifle, and.30 and.50 calibre machine guns. Next, they were sent to Camp Blanding, Florida, for training under challenging simulated field and battle conditions. Shortly after their arrival at Camp Blanding, the Japanese attacked Pearl Harbor. In February, 1942, the troops boarded a 46-ship convoy to Liverpool, England, which took 28 days and luckily avoided German submarines. In England, they kept in shape while they awaited arrival of sufficient troops and supplies to invade North Africa.

=== North African Campaign ===
In November, 1942, Brown took part in the US and British invasion at Oran, Algeria, in Operation Torch, joining the ongoing North African campaign. French troops there, who disliked the Nazis, had been ordered to repel the invasion, but gave little resistance against the overwhelming attack. Their next objective was Tunis, Tunisia, heavily fortified by the Germans—the Tunisian campaign. The Allies were miserable in the bitter winter cold and wind, while tens of thousands were killed, injured, or captured as prisoners of war. In May, 1942, German General Rommel's Afrika Korps surrendered, putting 85,000 German prisoners in the care of the Allies.

=== Invasion of Sicily ===
In July, 1943, Brown took part in the invasion of Sicily at Gela Beach. His platoon was involved in the capture of nearby Ponte Olivo Airfield. During the invasion of Sicily, Brown served as a leading infantry squad Forward Field Artillery Observer. It took 38 days of brutal fighting for the Allies to capture Sicily.

=== Invasion of Italy ===
In September, 1943, Brown took part in the Allied invasion of Italy, landing on the shores of the Salerno corridor. Brown was in a Corps Artillery battalion with 155 mm long range artillery that supported "whatever infantry division was most desperate for heavy artillery support". In January, 1944, Brown's platoon was supporting the Second Moroccan Division in the mountains East of the Abbey of Cassino. It was the beginning of the Battle of Monte Cassino. It was an early winter, cold with rain and snow. Brown recalled never being warm or dry in Italy. Many of the men were sick.

==== Twist of fate ====
Brown was called back to battalion headquarters while another lieutenant, who was ill, replaced him at the front. At headquarters, he learned that he was selected to return to the States to help form a new battalion – but the written orders would not arrive for a few days. Although expected to stay at headquarters until the orders arrived, Brown persuaded his colonel to let him return to the front until the orders arrived, so that the sick lieutenant could return to battalion headquarters to recover.

=== Injured at the front ===
On January 21, 1944, there was a major thrust across the Rapido River towards Monte Cassino as part of the Battle of Rapido River, with devastating casualties on both sides. Several men in Brown's platoon were killed or wounded. Brown was critically wounded when he was hit with shrapnel which severed his spinal cord mid-back, shattered his right leg and left elbow, and caused several flesh wounds. . Brown lay in the bitter cold until, hours later, an evacuation team of four men struggled through knee-deep snow to get to him, and carried him down the mountain. They drove him to the nearest aid station, staffed by French personnel, in a barn. There were no beds or cots. The wounded lay on the ground in or near the barn. They had run out of bandages and pain killing drugs. Because the barn was under German observation, the wounded could not be evacuated until dark. There was no water, but sips of wine were given to the wounded, desperately thirsty from loss of blood. After dark, a hospital train (convoy of trucks with enclosed backs) arrived. Four men per vehicle on stretchers were transported over rough roads that has been bombed. By midnight, they arrived at an American aid station, and Brown received a shot of morphine. He was immediately taken to the 38th Evacuation Hospital about ten miles behind the front. There, Brown was placed in the "shock ward", army cots in a big tent with a dirt floor, where he was expected to die, as did many men around him. The ward was understaffed, so the doctors and nurses worked beyond exhaustion. "Those nurses were so overwhelmed they would sometimes fall to their knees and weep."

When it appeared that Brown might survive, he was flown to the 33rd Field Hospital in Bizerte, Tunisia, North Africa. Brown developed violent involuntary spasms of his legs, one of which had been shattered. To enable his leg to heal, doctors improvised, putting Brown in a full-body plaster cast, neck to toes. He was in "almost intolerable pain", and the cast caused multiple pressure ulcers. Brown wrote "I have known hundreds of World War II paraplegics but I am the only one I ever knew who was placed in a plaster cast."

=== Years in hospitals ===
Brown and about 3,000 other patients were taken on the Hospital Ship Algonquin (painted white with a red cross and lit with floodlights at night to deter German attacks) across the Atlantic to Stark Hospital in Charleston, South Carolina. Within a few days, he was put on a hospital railroad train to Billings Hospital at Fort Benjamin Harrison in Indianapolis, Indiana. A doctor there immediately removed the full body cast, revealing many pressure ulcers. These took months to heal, and can be deadly without expert care. The doctor also prescribed surgery to control Brown's violent leg spasms. Brown was next moved by ambulance to Nichols General Hospital in Louisville, Kentucky. There, Major Warren V. Pierce MD was in charge of a new section exclusively for patients with spinal cord injuries, where Brown was the first such patient. Pierce had seen only one spinal cord injury prior to World War II. Physicians were only beginning to learn how to treat spinal cord injuries. Prior to World War II, nearly all died. The then-new antibiotics sulfonamides and penicillin were a huge help. Before long, Pierce had about 120 men with spinal cord injuries. To allow his pressure ulcers to heal, Brown was in a Stryker bed for several months. It "sandwiched" him in so that nurses could easily turn him over at regular intervals. It was uncomfortable and terribly boring, but the sores healed.

Brown was in Nichols Hospital for more than a year . By July, 1945 (a year and a half after his injury), he was able to visit relatives in Mt. Vernon, Indiana, accompanied by a nurse from Nichols Hospital .

==== Car with hand controls ====
In March, 1946, at Mt. Vernon, Indiana, Brown purchased a car adapted with hand controls, and planned a tour of the Western USA . PHOTOGRAPH of Brown in his new hand-controlled car. In April, the couple visited the parents of his wife (see #Marriage) in Lawton, Oklahoma .

=== Promotion to captain ===
Brown was commissioned as a second lieutenant in 1941. At some point during active duty, he was promoted to first lieutenant, his rank at the time of his injuries . Newspaper articles in 1945, the year after his injuries, continued to refer to him as a lieutenant . In early 1946, he is referred to as captain, evidently promoted after his injuries.

== Marriage ==
At Nichols Hospital, one of Brown's visitors was Betty Jane Christian, a native of Lawton, Oklahoma, whom he had dated while at Ft. Sill. Christian was then working as a clerk typist for the War Department in Washington, D.C. During her second visit, Brown asked her to marry him, and "unbelievably she said 'yes'". (Several years later, his wife told him that Dr. Pierce had warned her that Brown would likely die within a few years.) Christian and Brown were engaged in September, 1945, at which time they planned to be wed in the chapel at Nichols Hospital . But six weeks later, the wedding took place in the Evansville Indiana Methodist Church, after which the newly weds spent two weeks at the home of the groom's sister, Becky and Karl Martz, in Nashville, Indiana . They then resided at the home of the groom's father in Mt. Vernon, Indiana. In December, 1945, Brown attended a luncheon in Mt. Vernon, Indiana, featuring a speech by the Vocational Rehabilitation Counsellor for Southwestern Indiana .

== Employment at Sandia Base ==
In 1946, Brown and his wife moved to Albuquerque, New Mexico, and bought a house. Mrs. Brown's parents visited the couple in Albuquerque in September, 1946. While looking for a job in 1947, Brown was recruited for a civilian job at Sandia Base by Colonel John A. Ord, where he reported for duty to the Sandia Special Weapons Depot. One of Brown's assignments was technical writing. He recounted

When the U. S. began to stockpile atom bombs, military troops were responsible for transporting, handling and caring for them. The scientists at Los Alamos Scientific Laboratories wrote technical manuals about these weapons and how to keep them ready for use. But those scientists wrote in technical terms that the average soldier could not understand. My job was ot translate the scientific manuals into plain English the average soldier could understand. This was a challenging job and I enjoyed it. I received several commendations for my work.

In 1951, Brown took a leave of absence in order to do graduate work in electrical engineering at the University of New Mexico. He became a graduate teaching assistant and managed correspondence for Dr. Ralph W. Tapy, after whom Tapy Hall was named . Brown was concurrently taking 15 hours of engineering coursework. He developed a kidney infection, and was taken to the VA Long Beach Spinal Cord Injury and Disorders Center for three months.

In 1952, after returning to Sandia Base, Brown was assigned to teach field grade officers (Majors, Lt. Colonels, and Colonels) how to maintain nuclear weapons. Weapons had been stockpiled in strategic locations around the world, and some were not being adequately cared for. Brown wrote course manuals and taught six-week classes to groups of about 25 officers. Teaching from his wheelchair, he was an inspiration and role model for others with spinal cord injuries . Subsequently, he taught company grade officers (Captains, First and Second Lieutenants), and later on, top grades of enlisted personnel. Each atomic weapon was maintained daily by its own squad of military personnel. The Sandia lesson guides were adopted by military organizations throughout the allied world. . In the late 1950s, Brown took part in the design of new sections of Sandia Laboratory. Brown retired from Sandia Laboratory in 1968 .

=== Awards ===
Brown won numerous awards for his work at Sandia Base, including:

- 1957: Incentive Awards for producing a technical manual and suggesting improvements to an electrical instrument, presented by the Sandia Special Weapons Depot.
- 1958: Employee suggestion award for writing a manual adopted by the Navy Bureau of Ordnance, presented from the Armed Forces Special Weapons Project.
- 1961, April: Sustained superior performance award from Sandia Base.
- 1961, December: Suggestion certificate award from Sandia Base.
- 1962, February: Award for suggestion, presented by Sandia Base.
- 1962, June: Another money-saving suggestion. Brown has submitted 14 suggestions, 9 of which have been adopted, saving the Government $15,000 (about $150,000 in 2024 dollars).
- 1965: Outstanding Performance Rating Certificate from the Defense Atomic Support Agency, the highest form of recognition given Field Command civilian employees.

== Personal life ==
While stationed at Ft. Sill, Oklahoma, in 1941, Brown dated Betty Jane Christian, who became his wife of 61 years (see #Marriage). The couple moved to Albuquerque in 1946. In 1949, with substantial help from the community and the VA, the Browns had a home built in Albuquerque that was specially designed for a person in a wheelchair . This was their home until the early 1970s, when they lived in Hawaii for a few years to be close to their son Cliff and his family. In 1976, they returned to Albuquerque because Hawaii did not have the medical facilities needed by an ageing paraplegic. At that time, the Albuquerque Veterans Hospital was building a wing to specialize in care for spinal cord injured people. The Browns purchased a townhouse in Northeast Albuquerque, where they lived for the remainder of their lives. They also purchased a cabin near Jemez Springs NM in the Jemez Mountains North of Albuquerque, which they enjoyed in summers.

=== Betty Christian Brown ===
Brown credits the tireless attention he and his children received from his wife of 61 years as a major contribution to his longevity and well-being. Betty Christian Brown was very active in the community and the First Presbyterian Church. In 1959 she was President of the Osteopathic Hospital Guild . Many times she organized and ran preparations in the Church kitchen for a dinner for 300 members. She was elected and ordained Elder and Deacon in their Church. One year she served as chair of the Church Chancel Guild. She was an accomplished seamstress who crafted large banners to hang in the First Presbyterian Church.

=== Children ===
After trying artificial insemination without success, they applied to adopt. There was a waiting list of couples without handicaps, so their application was denied. With their lawyer, Jim Sperling, and the pastor of their church, Dr. Everett B. King, as advocates, they appealed the denial in front of a judge for the Department of Child Welfare. Brown paraphrases Dr. King as saying:

Judge, ... do you know any person or couple who has a perfect life? A person or couple who has who never have some physical or emotional handicap? ... Maybe the Child Welfare Department can find a couple who wants to adopt and who has no handicap of any kind. When they do I want to meet that person or couple because it will be a first for me.

Their appeal was granted.

In January, 1949, they adopted Lawrence Edward. He was intelligent but social and behavioral problems arose, and eventually he was diagnosed as "schizophrenic" (bi-polar in today's language). There were "years of psychologists, psychiatrists, and special schools" and occasional hospitalization. Betty worked jobs to help pay for Lawrence's care . As an adult, Lawrence "dropped out" for some years, living in California, but eventually trained to become a machinist and precision sheet-metal worker. He died in 1995 at age 46 from a stroke.

In 1952, the Browns adopted Paul Clifford, who was quite popular as a boy, and loved horses. Cliff enlisted in the Army at age 18, and became a military police officer stationed in Hawaii. Cliff married Mona Janice Strong in 1972 . They had a daughter, Clarie, but were later divorced. Later, in Guam, Cliff sustained serious brain injury in an accident. He died in 2010 in a nursing home at age 57 .

=== Death ===
Edward S. Brown died in 2005, a few months after his 85th birthday . His wife lived another decade . Their ashes are interred at Santa Fe National Cemetery.

== Community service ==
Brown and his wife Betty volunteered many services to their community. Brown does not mention most of these in his autobiography. Their service included:

- Spinal cord injured people: Brown made personal visits to spinal cord injured people in his community, providing inspiration and a role model. In 1956, these efforts led him to be recognized as New Mexico State Handicapped Man of the Year.
- Opening their home to two young women attending school: The Browns opened their home to two young women who needed to reside in Albuquerque while attending school. The first, in the 1950s, was "Wanda" from Quimado NM, arranged through the Presbyterian Church. She needed a home in Albuquerque while she attended business school. She turned out to be a wonderful baby sitter with a lot of common sense. The second was their niece Carolyn Waggoner of Marlow, Oklahoma. When her mother had a health crisis, the Browns provided a home for Carolyn for eight years, while she completed high school and business school.
- 20-30 Club: Brown served as president of this organization that helps younger people develop leadership skills. Society for Crippled Children: Brown was active in this organization.
- First Presbyterian Church: Brown was a Deacon, a member of its Education Committee, and taught Sunday School classes.
- Westminster Fellowship at the University of New Mexico: Brown sponsored this organization from 1949 to 1954.
- United Student Christian Fellowship, University of New Mexico: Brown was chairman of the Finance Committee.
- Military Order of the Purple Heart: Brown was Commander of the Albuquerque Chapter, which helped the handicapped to find jobs.
- Ministry to Indian School Children: Brown headed a program involving 40-50 families that welcomed the children to spend a weekend in their homes.
- Society of Military Engineers: Brown served as president.
- Ostomy Association: As an ostomate later in life, Brown served as treasurer of the local Ostomy Association.
