= RockyNoHands =

American streamer (born 1987)

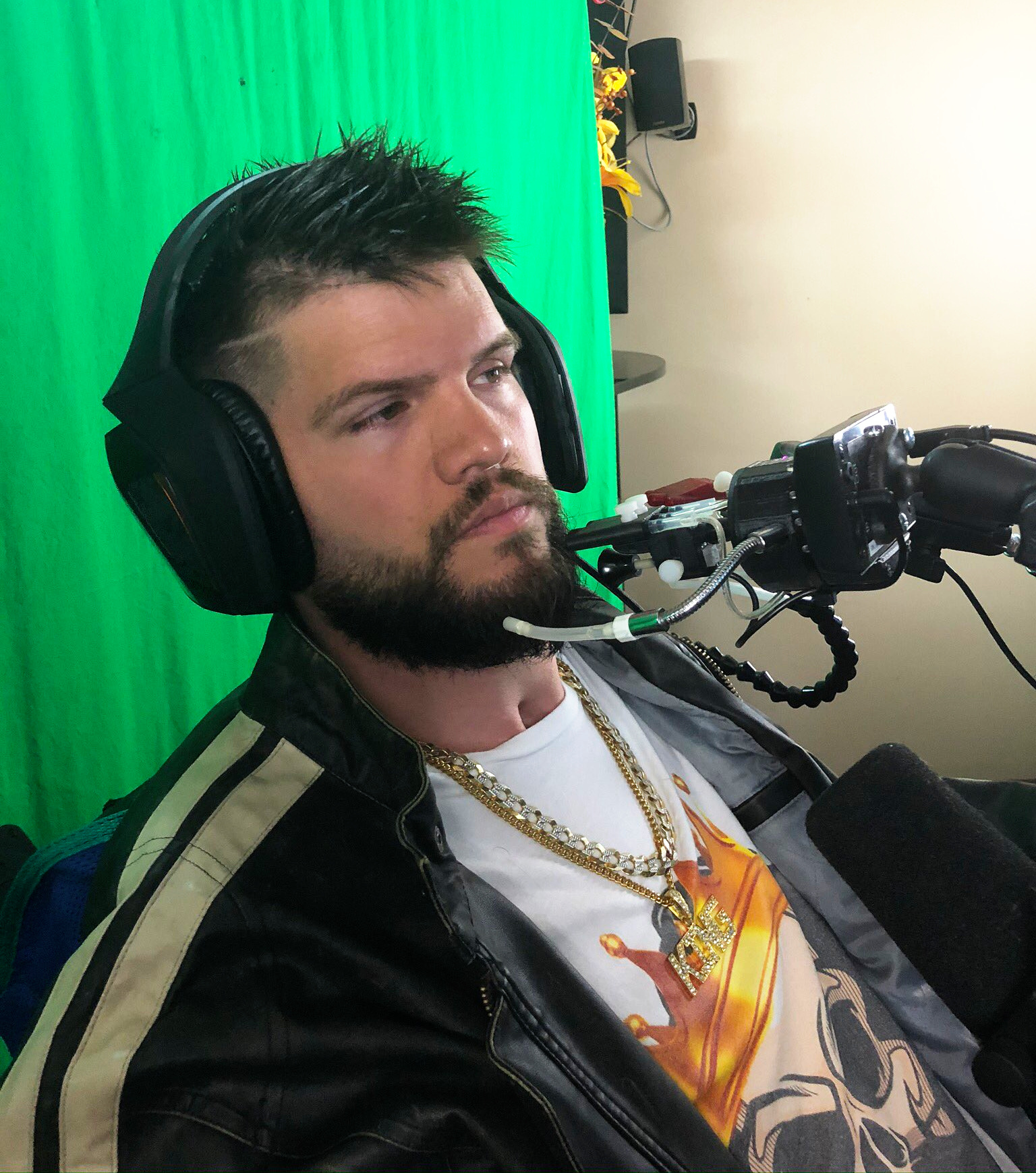
- Stoutenburgh in 2022
- Born: Rocky Stoutenburgh; April 22, 1987 (age 39)
- Occupation: Online streamer

TikTok information
- Page: RockyNoHands
- Followers: 1 million

Twitch information
- Channel: RockyNoHands
- Years active: 2017–present
- Genre: Gaming
- Followers: 73.3 thousand

YouTube information
- Channel: RockyNoHands
- Subscribers: 58.5 thousand
- Views: 2.47 million
- Last updated: April 2023

Rocky Stoutenburgh (born April 22, 1987), better known as RockyNoHands, is an American streamer. In 2006, when he was 19 years old, he severed his spinal cord, becoming paralyzed from the neck down. He broke two Guinness World Records in the video game Fortnite by 2020. In 2020, he signed with Luminosity Gaming, becoming the first-ever quadriplegic to sign with an esports organization.

== Early life ==
Rocky Stoutenburgh was born on April 22, 1987, and grew up in his hometown of Southgate, Michigan, alongside his younger brother Andrew. He developed a passion for video games during his youth, but his engagement waned during his teenage years due to various commitments, including school and work. After high school, he pursued full-time employment at a scrapyard near Southgate.

In 2006, at the age of 19, Stoutenburgh sustained an injury after falling on his head while wrestling with his friends. He was airlifted to a hospital in Ann Arbor, where he was diagnosed with a broken C3 cervical vertebra, leaving him paralyzed from the neck down.

Several years after his injury, his brother convinced him to play video games again by using a QuadStick, a mouth-operated video game controller. Stoutenburgh played games such as Call of Duty and Halo Wars using the device; however, he quit playing video games after five years, as the controller continually broke. However, after a new model, the FPS QuadStick, was released, he started playing again.

== Streaming career ==
In January 2017, Stoutenburgh began streaming on Twitch and uploading his gameplay on YouTube, under the name RockyNoHands. In his first-ever stream, he won a PlayerUnknown's Battlegrounds match.

Stoutenburgh set two Guinness World Records, making it into Guinness World Records 2020 and Guinness World Records 2020 Gamer's Edition, for achieving for the most wins and kills in a match in Fortnite using only his mouth. He had 509 wins and 11 kills in a single match as of March 2019.

Stoutenburgh gained more visibility in July 2020, after he won the competition "So You Think You Can Stream?", a talent contest hosted by Destructoid. Stoutenburgh's victory in the competition led to him signing with a professional esports contract with Luminosity Gaming as a content creator. The contract made him the first-ever quadriplegic to sign a deal with a professional esports organization. By September 2020, Stoutenburgh had over 67,000 followers on Twitch and 54,000 subscribers on YouTube. in January 2024 RockyNoHands contract with Luminosity Gaming expired and became a free agent.
